= National Register of Historic Places listings in southern New Castle County, Delaware =

This is a list of the National Register of Historic Places listings in southern New Castle County, Delaware.

It is intended to be a complete list of the properties and districts on National Register of Historic Places in New Castle County, Delaware south of the Chesapeake and Delaware Canal. The locations of National Register properties and districts for which the latitude and longitude coordinates are included below, may be seen in a map.

There are 400 properties and districts listed on the National Register in the county. Of those, 87 are located south of the Chesapeake and Delaware Canal and are listed here, including one site further designated as a National Historic Landmark. There are 90 sites in Wilmington, which are listed at National Register of Historic Places listings in Wilmington, Delaware, and 49 sites in Newark, which are listed at National Register of Historic Places listings in Newark, Delaware. There are 177 sites in northern New Castle County outside Wilmington, which are listed at National Register of Historic Places listings in northern New Castle County, Delaware.
This National Park Service list is complete through NPS recent listings posted May 22, 2026.

Contents: Counties and municipalities in Delaware
Newark (New Castle) | Wilmington (New Castle) | Northern New Castle | Southern New Castle | Kent | Sussex

== Current listings south of the Chesapeake and Delaware Canal ==
	Name on the Register	Image	Date listed	Location	City or town	Description
1	Achmester	Achmester	December 28, 1979 (#79000626)	617 Marl Pit Rd. 39°29′02″N 75°42′27″W	Middletown (St. Georges Hundred)	Owned by New Castle County, demolition by neglect, torn down in 2022.
2	Appoquinimink Friends Meetinghouse	Appoquinimink Friends Meetinghouse	December 4, 1972 (#72000288)	624 Main St. 39°27′26″N 75°39′50″W	Odessa	Very small brick meetinghouse used as an Underground Railroad station
3	Armstrong-Walker House	Armstrong-Walker House	September 13, 1985 (#85002103)	5036 Summit Bridge Rd. 39°28′41″N 75°43′16″W	Middletown (St. Georges Hundred)	
4	Ashton Historic District	Ashton Historic District	November 15, 1978 (#78000903)	North of Port Penn on Thorntown Rd. 39°31′52″N 75°35′03″W	Port Penn	
5	Augustine Beach Hotel	Augustine Beach Hotel	April 3, 1973 (#73000537)	1919 Augustine Beach Rd. 39°30′27″N 75°34′47″W	Port Penn vicinity	
6	Duncan Beard Site	Duncan Beard Site	December 18, 1973 (#73000534)	1.4 miles southeast on Delaware Route 299 from intersection with U.S. Route 13; 39°26′25″N 75°38′38″W	Odessa (Appoquinimink Hundred)	
7	Belleview	Belleview	September 13, 1985 (#85002104)	855 Shallcross Lake Rd. 39°29′27″N 75°39′53″W	Middletown (St. Georges Hundred)	
8	Biddle House	Biddle House	December 8, 1978 (#78000908)	2120 DuPont Parkway; 39°31′25″N 75°38′52″W	Biddles Corner	
9	Gov. Benjamin T. Biggs Farm	Gov. Benjamin T. Biggs Farm	September 11, 1987 (#87001508)	1196 Choptank Rd. 39°30′54″N 75°44′46″W	Middletown (Pencader Hundred)	
10	Brook Ramble	Brook Ramble	September 11, 1992 (#92001137)	295 Grears Corner Rd. 39°24′09″N 75°43′55″W	Townsend (Appoquinimink Hundred)	
11	Choptank	Choptank	September 13, 1985 (#85002108)	1542 Choptank Rd. 39°29′49″N 75°44′24″W	Middletown (St. Georges Hundred)	
12	Choptank-Upon-The-Hill	Choptank-Upon-The-Hill	November 19, 1985 (#85003528)	121 Colonel Clayton Dr. 39°29′48″N 75°44′49″W	Middletown (St. Georges Hundred)	
13	Clearfield Farm	Clearfield Farm	March 20, 1973 (#73000540)	867 Smyrna Landing Rd. 39°19′43″N 75°36′06″W	Smyrna (Blackbird Hundred)	
14	Cleaver House	Cleaver House	September 13, 1985 (#85002116)	713 Port Penn Rd. 39°31′23″N 75°36′52″W	Port Penn	
15	Cochran Grange	Cochran Grange	April 3, 1973 (#73000514)	704 Middletown-Warwick Rd. 39°26′35″N 75°44′11″W	Middletown	
16	Corbit-Sharp House	Corbit-Sharp House	December 24, 1967 (#67000004)	118 Main St. 39°27′14″N 75°39′25″W	Odessa	
17	Cornucopia	Cornucopia	September 8, 1987 (#87001517)	1377 Bethel Church Rd. 39°31′33″N 75°46′23″W	Middletown (Pencader Hundred)	
18	Delaware Boundary Markers	Delaware Boundary Markers	February 18, 1975 (#75002101)	Delaware state boundary lines with Maryland and Pennsylvania	Not applicable	
19	Dilworth House	Dilworth House	November 27, 1973 (#73000538)	Off Delaware Route 9; 39°31′05″N 75°36′17″W	Port Penn	
20	A. Eliason House	A. Eliason House	September 13, 1985 (#85002110)	4353 Summit Bridge Rd. 39°31′07″N 75°42′50″W	Mt. Pleasant (St. Georges Hundred)	
21	Elm Grange	Elm Grange	September 13, 1985 (#85002120)	2424 DuPont Parkway; 39°29′50″N 75°38′56″W	Odessa (St. Georges Hundred)	Demolished between 2007 and 2009.
22	Fairview	Fairview	November 19, 1985 (#85003523)	781 Lorewood Grove Rd. 39°32′08″N 75°40′22″W	Odessa (St. Georges Hundred)	
23	Fairview	Fairview	May 3, 1984 (#84000835)	602 Old State Rd. 39°26′56″N 75°38′53″W	Odessa (Appoquinimink Hundred)	Also known as the "Mayor James Moore House"
24	Fairview	Fairview	September 8, 1987 (#87001494)	3 East Stonewall Dr. 39°31′26″N 75°45′44″W	Middletown (Pencader Hundred)	
25	Fields Heirs	Fields Heirs	September 13, 1985 (#85002109)	Off Middletown Warwick Road; 39°27′25″N 75°43′31″W	Middletown	Demolished between 1992 and 2002
26	Fleming House	Fleming House	January 31, 1980 (#80000934)	992 Flemings Landing Rd. 39°21′17″N 75°33′03″W	Smyrna (Blackbird Hundred)	
27	J. M. Gordon House	J. M. Gordon House	September 13, 1985 (#85002121)	910 Vance Neck Rd. 39°28′27″N 75°37′27″W	Odessa (St. Georges Hundred)	
28	Green Meadow	Green Meadow	September 11, 1992 (#92001132)	484 Thomas Landing Rd. (Road 440); 39°26′54″N 75°36′49″W	Odessa (Appoquinimink Hundred)	
29	Greenlawn	Greenlawn	April 24, 1973 (#73000515)	671 N. Broad St. 39°27′26″N 75°43′07″W	Middletown	Demolished c. 1985
30	Robert Grose House		September 21, 2001 (#01001006)	1000 Port Penn Rd. 39°31′10″N 75°35′39″W	Port Penn	Demolished between 2002 and 2006
31	B. F. Hanson House	B. F. Hanson House	April 27, 1982 (#82002332)	1130 Middletown-Warwick Rd. 39°25′40″N 75°45′35″W	Middletown (St. Georges Hundred)	
32	Hart House	Hart House	March 20, 1973 (#73000544)	477 Cedar Swamp Rd. 39°24′57″N 75°32′53″W	Taylors Bridge	
33	Hazel Glen	Hazel Glen	November 20, 1978 (#78000904)	1920 Pole Bridge Rd. 39°30′51″N 75°36′57″W	Port Penn	Demolished before 1991
34	Hedgelawn	Hedgelawn	April 3, 1973 (#73000516)	772 Middletown-Warwick Rd. 39°26′29″N 75°44′30″W	Middletown	
35	Hell Island Site		April 13, 1977 (#77000390)	Address Restricted	Odessa	
36	S. Higgins Farm	S. Higgins Farm	September 13, 1985 (#85002122)	913 Ash Farm Way; 39°29′36″N 75°37′56″W	Odessa (St. Georges Hundred)	
37	Hill Island Farm	Hill Island Farm	September 11, 1992 (#92001139)	3381 Harris Rd. 39°26′03″N 75°40′02″W	Middletown	
38	S. Holton Farm	S. Holton Farm	September 13, 1985 (#85002105)	2010 Choptank Rd. 39°28′18″N 75°44′10″W	Middletown	
39	Homestead Hall	Homestead Hall	August 13, 2018 (#100002770)	362 Grears Corner Rd. 39°23′44″N 75°44′05″W	Townsend	
40	Huguenot House	Huguenot House	March 20, 1973 (#73000545)	798 Taylors Bridge Rd. 39°24′02″N 75°36′57″W	Taylors Bridge	
41	Idalia Manor	Idalia Manor	September 13, 1985 (#85002118)	1870 DuPont Parkway; 39°32′25″N 75°38′49″W	Mt. Pleasant (St. Georges Hundred)	
42	Johnson Home Farm		September 11, 1992 (#92001133)	166 Cedar Swamp Rd. 39°24′42″N 75°34′59″W	Taylors Bridge	Demolished between 1992 and 2002
43	Liston House		March 26, 1973 (#73000546)	Cedar Swamp Rd. 39°24′17″N 75°32′35″W	Taylors Bridge	Demolished before 1991
44	Liston Range Front Lighthouse	Liston Range Front Lighthouse	January 14, 2004 (#03001386)	1600 Belts Rd. 39°28′58″N 75°35′31″W	Bay View Beach	
45	Liston Range Rear Light Station	Liston Range Rear Light Station	November 15, 1978 (#78000905)	West of Port Penn on Road 2; 39°31′25″N 75°38′24″W	Port Penn	
46	Comdr. Thomas MacDonough House	Comdr. Thomas MacDonough House	December 12, 1978 (#78000902)	2501 DuPont Parkway; 39°29′29″N 75°39′02″W	Odessa (St. Georges Hundred)	
47	Maple Grove Farm		September 13, 1985 (#85002106)	Delaware Route 299; 39°26′51″N 75°42′07″W	Middletown	Demolished between 1992 and 2002
48	Maples	Maples	February 17, 1978 (#78000895)	1023 Bunker Hill Rd. 39°27′18″N 75°44′16″W	Middletown (St. Georges Hundred)	
49	Mayfield	Mayfield	August 1, 1997 (#97000836)	1603 Levels Rd. 39°24′01″N 75°45′21″W	Middletown (Appoquinimink Hundred)	
50	McWhorter House	McWhorter House	September 13, 1985 (#85002123)	606 Lorewood Grove Rd. 39°32′26″N 75°39′43″W	Odessa (St. Georges Hundred)	Demolished in 2004
51	Middletown Academy	Middletown Academy	December 5, 1972 (#72000284)	218 N. Broad St. 39°27′05″N 75°43′04″W	Middletown	
52	Middletown Historic District	Middletown Historic District	October 4, 1978 (#78000896)	Roughly bounded by Redding, Scott, Lockwood, and Catherine Sts. 39°26′59″N 75°43′00″W	Middletown	
53	Misty Vale	Misty Vale	September 13, 1985 (#85002111)	216 Manchester Way; 39°29′20″N 75°38′22″W	Odessa (St. Georges Hundred)	
54	Mondamon Farm	Mondamon Farm	November 19, 1985 (#85003524)	381 Port Penn Rd. 39°31′28″N 75°38′27″W	Odessa (St. Georges Hundred)	
55	Monterey	Monterey	December 5, 1980 (#80000933)	692 Bayview Rd. 39°29′28″N 75°38′37″W	Odessa (St. Georges Hundred)	
56	Arnold S. Naudain House	Arnold S. Naudain House	April 24, 1973 (#73000517)	5567 Summit Bridge Rd. 39°25′15″N 75°42′13″W	Middletown (St. Georges Hundred)	
57	John B. Nelson House	John B. Nelson House	December 8, 1978 (#78000906)	740 Dutch Neck Road; 39°31′58″N 75°37′58″W	Port Penn	
58	Noxontown	Noxontown	July 2, 1973 (#73000518)	Noxontown Road; 39°26′09″N 75°41′02″W	Middletown	
59	Odessa Historic District	Odessa Historic District	June 21, 1971 (#71000227)	Bounded roughly by Appoquinimink Creek on the southeast, High St. on the northeast, 4th St. on the northwest, and Main St. on the southwest 39°27′14″N 75°39′23″W	Odessa	
60	Okolona	Okolona	November 19, 1985 (#85003527)	1321 Shallcross Lake Rd. 39°28′35″N 75°41′31″W	Middletown (St. Georges Hundred)	
61	Old Brick Store	Old Brick Store	August 14, 1973 (#73000541)	670 Brick Store Landing Rd. 39°19′19″N 75°34′20″W	Smyrna (Blackbird Hundred)	1767 Brick Store
62	Old Drawyers Church	Old Drawyers Church	February 6, 1973 (#73000533)	2839 DuPont Parkway; 39°28′04″N 75°39′15″W	Odessa (St. Georges Hundred)	
63	Old Ford Dairy		September 13, 1985 (#85002112)	1871 DuPont Parkway; 39°32′25″N 75°39′07″W	Odessa (St. Georges Hundred)	Demolished between 2007 and 2009
64	Old St. Anne's Church	Old St. Anne's Church	March 7, 1973 (#73000519)	105 St Annes Church Rd. 39°26′09″N 75°42′47″W	Middletown	
65	Old St. Paul's Methodist Episcopal Church	Old St. Paul's Methodist Episcopal Church	May 13, 1982 (#82002353)	506 High St. 39°27′27″N 75°39′38″W	Odessa	
66	Old Union Methodist Church	Old Union Methodist Church	January 18, 1973 (#73000507)	205 Union Church Road; 39°23′17″N 75°39′47″W	Townsend (Appoquinimink Hundred)	
67	Pharo House	Pharo House	August 9, 1984 (#84000850)	100 Silver Lake Rd. 39°27′01″N 75°41′46″W	Middletown	
68	Port Penn Historic District	Port Penn Historic District	November 20, 1978 (#78000907)	Delaware Route 9; 39°30′57″N 75°34′34″W	Port Penn	
69	Philip Reading Tannery	Philip Reading Tannery	April 26, 1978 (#78000897)	201 E. Main St. 39°27′02″N 75°42′44″W	Middletown	Demolished between 1992 and 2002
70	Reedy Island Range Rear Light	Reedy Island Range Rear Light	March 27, 1989 (#89000288)	1171 Taylors Bridge Rd. 39°24′24″N 75°35′25″W	Taylors Bridge	
71	Retirement Farm	Retirement Farm	September 13, 1985 (#85002113)	2256 DuPont Parkway; 39°30′46″N 75°38′38″W	Odessa (St. Georges Hundred)	
72	Riverdale	Riverdale	November 19, 1985 (#85003525)	1211 Silver Run Rd. in St Georges Hundred; 39°29′09″N 75°36′17″W	Odessa	
73	Rosedale	Rosedale	September 13, 1985 (#85002107)	1143 Bunker Hill Rd. 39°27′35″N 75°44′43″W	Middletown (St. Georges Hundred)	
74	Rumsey Farm		March 30, 1978 (#78000898)	829 Middletown-Warwick Rd. 39°26′29″N 75°44′58″W	Middletown	Demolished between 2011 and 2013.
75	St. Joseph's Church	St. Joseph's Church	February 17, 1978 (#78000899)	15 W. Cochran St. 39°26′52″N 75°43′06″W	Middletown	
76	J. Shallcross House	J. Shallcross House	September 13, 1985 (#85002115)	557 Middletown-Odessa Rd. 39°27′09″N 75°41′32″W	Middletown	Mistakenly called "J. K. Williams House" in nomination
77	Sereck Shallcross House	Sereck Shallcross House	April 3, 1973 (#73000535)	833 Marl Pit Rd. 39°28′19″N 75°41′25″W	Odessa (St. Georges Hundred)	
78	Taylor's Bridge School	Taylor's Bridge School	June 20, 2019 (#100004079)	121 Flemings Landing Rd. 39°24′19″N 75°35′19″W	Townsend vicinity	
79	David W. Thomas House	David W. Thomas House	September 11, 1992 (#92001136)	326 Thomas Landing Rd. 39°26′45″N 75°37′38″W	Odessa (Appoquinimink Hundred)	
80	Townsend Historic District	Townsend Historic District	May 8, 1986 (#86001029)	Roughly bounded by Gray, Ginn and South, Lattamus and Main Sts., and Commerce St. and Cannery Ln. and Railroad Ave. 39°23′39″N 75°41′33″W	Townsend	
81	A. M. Vail House		September 13, 1985 (#85002117)	521 Middletown-Odessa Rd. 39°27′07″N 75°41′45″W	Middletown	Demolished between 2007 and 2009
82	Vandyke-Heath House	Vandyke-Heath House	September 11, 1992 (#92001130)	385 Green Spring-Vandyke Rd. (Road 47); 39°21′26″N 75°44′53″W	Townsend (Appoquinimink Hundred)	Demolished 2020 after arson
83	Charles C. Weldon House	Charles C. Weldon House	September 13, 1985 (#85002114)	Road 44; 39°28′18″N 75°37′51″W	Odessa	Mistakenly called "J. Vandegrift House" in nomination
84	Weston	Weston	November 19, 1985 (#85003526)	4677 Summit Bridge Rd. 39°30′02″N 75°42′36″W	Middletown (St. Georges Hundred)	
85	Williams House	Williams House	June 4, 1973 (#73000536)	993 Marl Pit Rd. 39°28′00″N 75°40′49″W	Odessa (St. Georges Hundred)	
86	Windsor	Windsor	September 11, 1992 (#92001131)	1060 Dutch Neck Rd. 39°32′48″N 75°36′53″W	Port Penn	
87	Woodside	Woodside	September 13, 1985 (#85002119)	1358 Choptank Rd. 39°30′23″N 75°45′01″W	Mt. Pleasant (Pencader Hundred)	

== See also ==
- National Register of Historic Places listings in Delaware
- List of National Historic Landmarks in Delaware
