= Okolona =

Okolona may refer to a place in the United States:

- Okolona, Arkansas
- Okolona (Middletown, Delaware), listed on the National Register of Historic Places in New Castle County, Delaware
- Okolona, Louisville, Kentucky
- Okolona, Mississippi
- Okolona, Ohio
