= Hell Island Site =

Archaeological site in Delaware, US

- U.S. National Register of Historic Places
- Nearest city: Odessa, Delaware
- Area: 6 acres (2.4 ha)
- NRHP reference No.: 77000390
- Added to NRHP: April 13, 1977

The Hell Island Site (7NC-F-7) is a prehistoric archaeological site located near Odessa, Delaware, United States. The site is a type site for a class of ceramics found at other sites in the region. Artifacts recovered from the site during excavations in 1965 yielded then-distinctive tempered pottery with cordmarking on the interior and exterior, as well as evidence of occupation of the site from the Archaic to the Late Woodland Period.

The site was listed on the National Register of Historic Places in 1977.

== See also ==
- National Register of Historic Places in southern New Castle County, Delaware
