= Old Union Methodist Church =

Historic church in Delaware, United States

- U.S. National Register of Historic Places
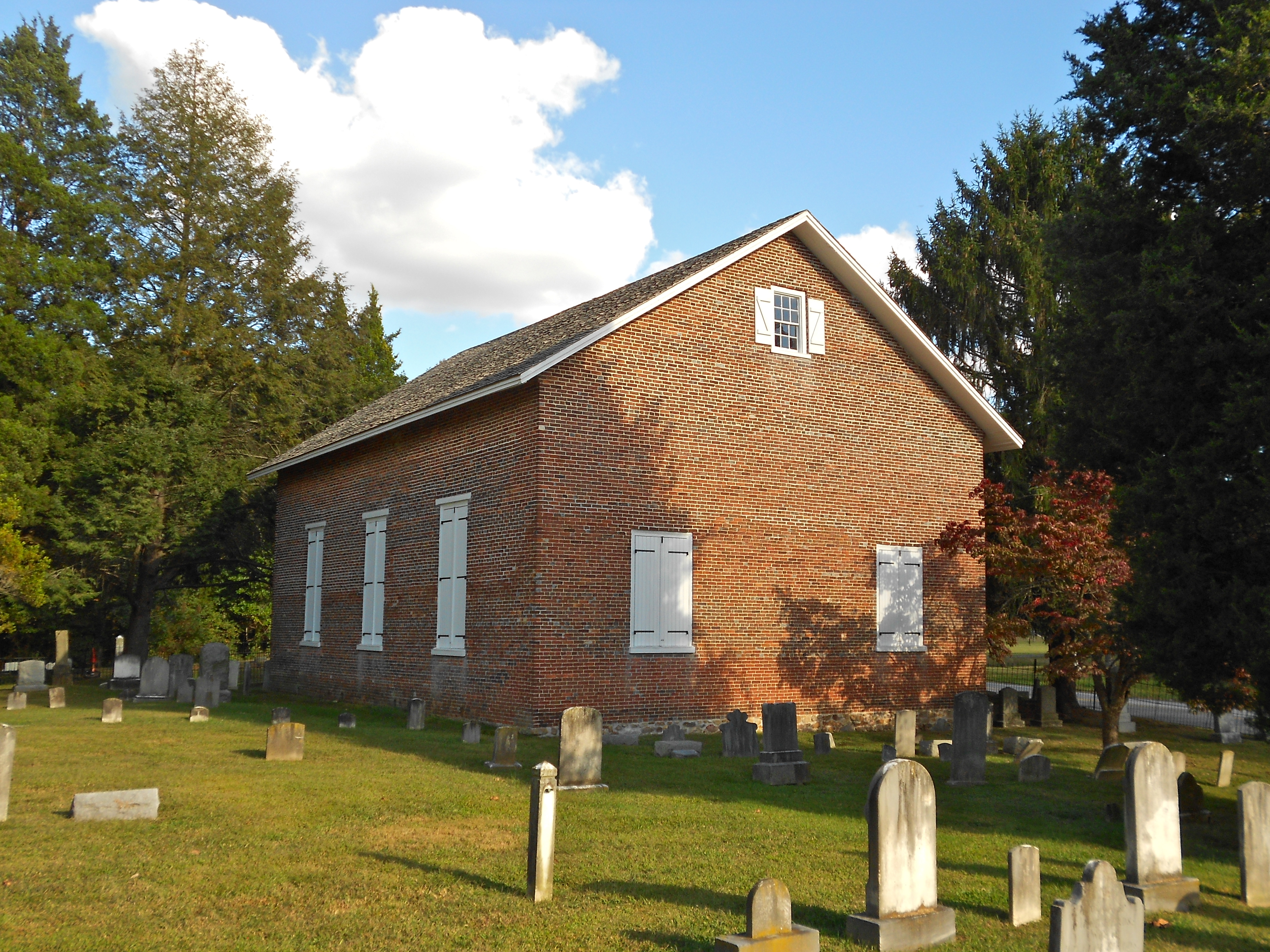
- View from the northwest

- Location within Delaware Location within the United States
- Location: 205 Union Church Road, Townsend, Delaware
- Coordinates: 39.388028°N 75.662994°W
- Area: 5 acres (2.0 ha)
- Built: 1847; 179 years ago
- NRHP reference No.: 73000507
- Added to NRHP: January 18, 1973

Old Union Methodist Church is a historic Methodist church located 0.2 miles (0.32 km) north of Blackbird Crossroads on U.S. 13 in Townsend, New Castle County, Delaware. It was built in 1847, and is a two-story, brick meeting house measuring 40 feet by 60 feet. It is surrounded by a cemetery.

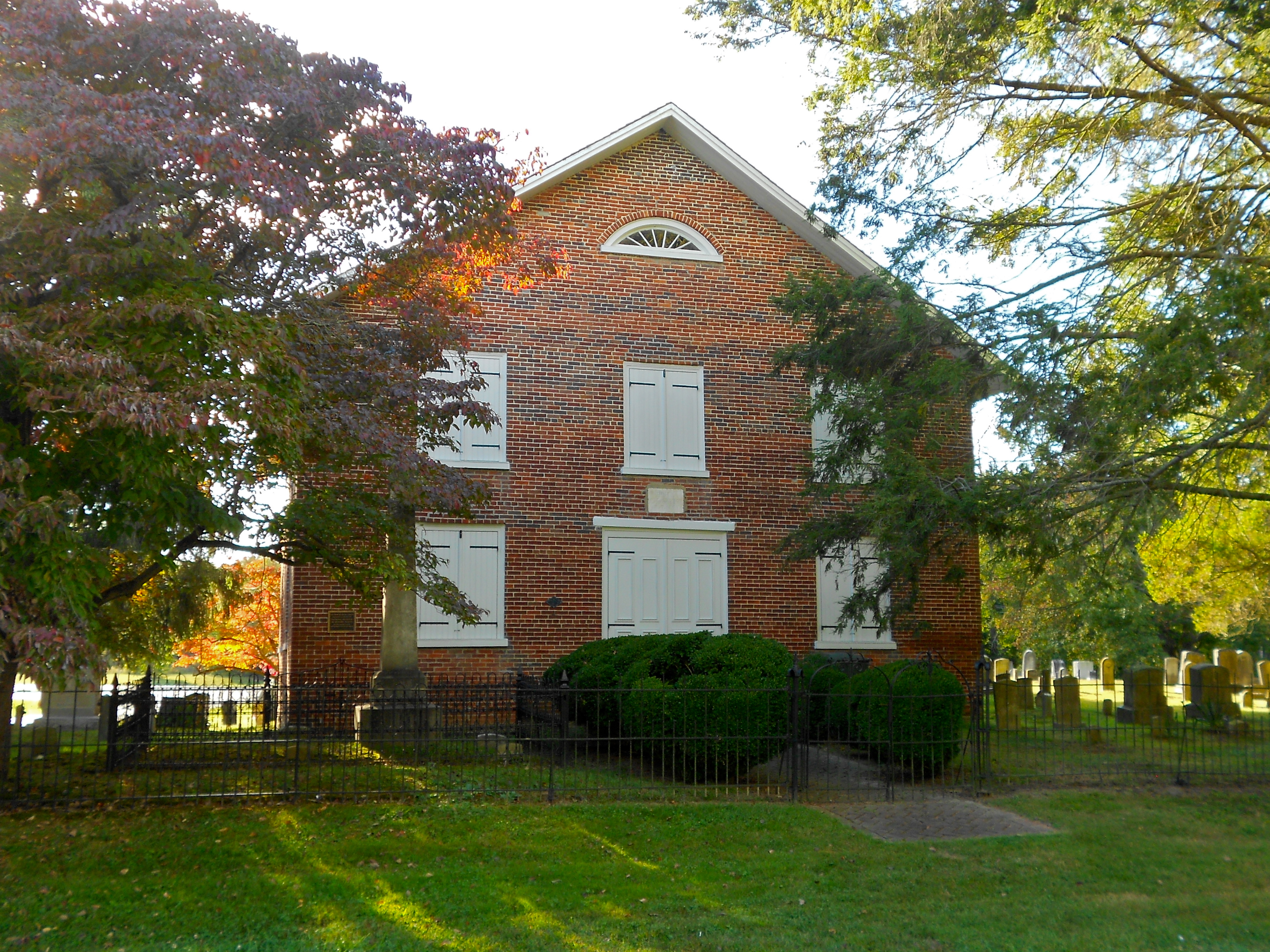
View from the east

The congregation was organized in 1789.

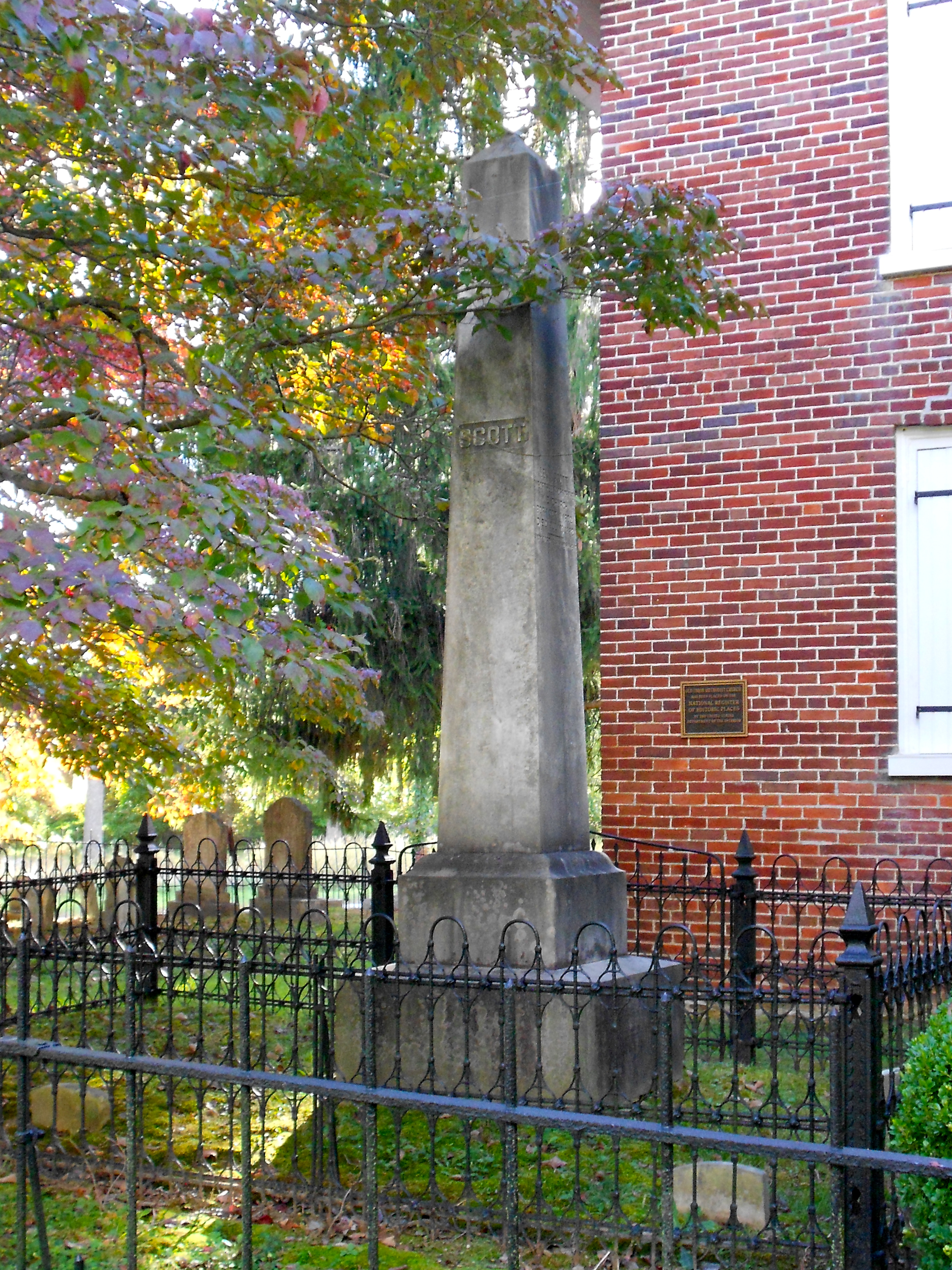
Grave of Bishop Levi Scott near the entrance to the church.

It was listed on the National Register of Historic Places in 1973.
