= Rosedale (Middletown, Delaware) =

Historic house in Delaware, United States

- U.S. National Register of Historic Places
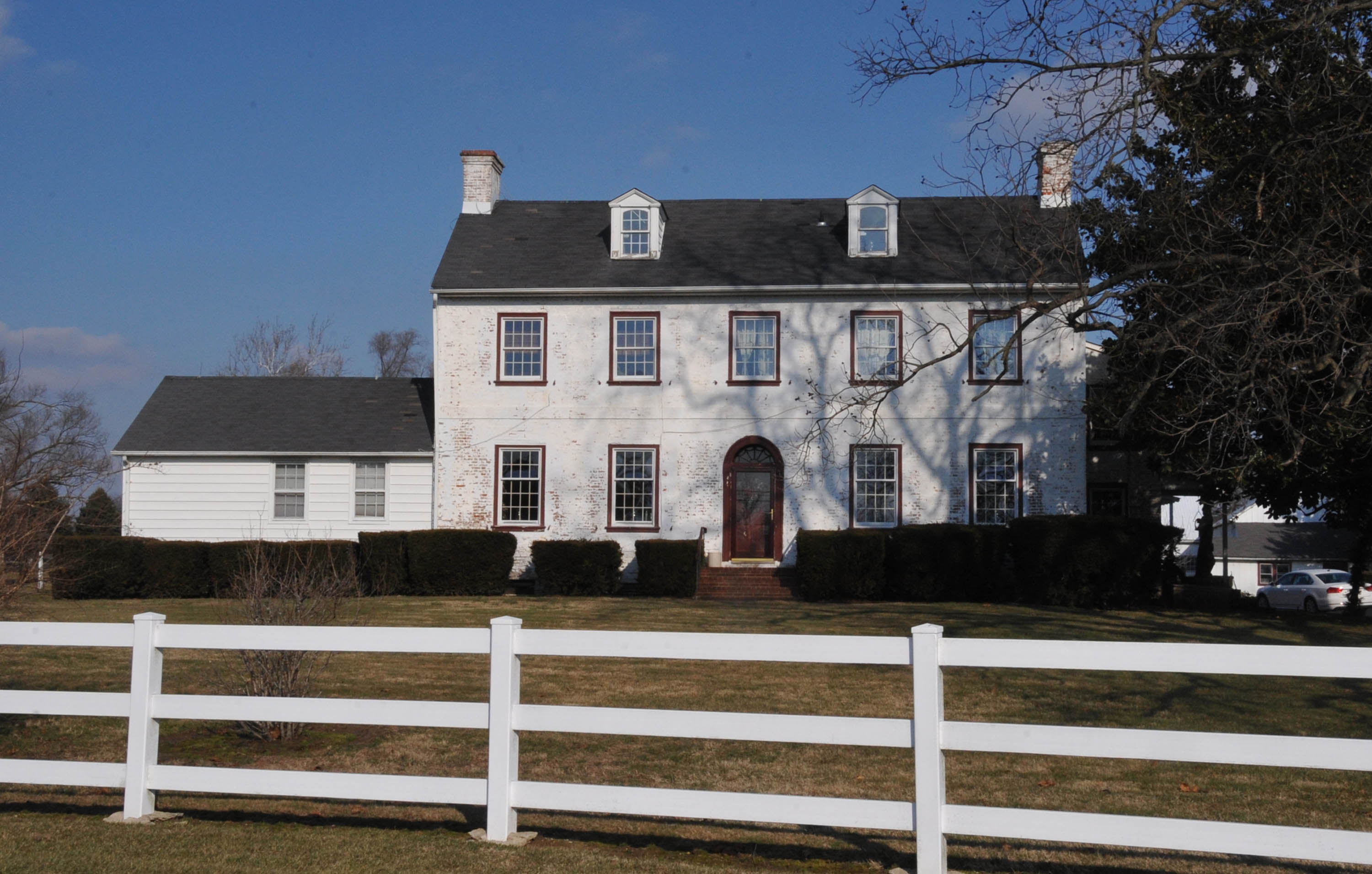

- Location within Delaware Location within the United States
- Location: 1143 Bunker Hill Road in St. Georges Hundred, near Middletown, Delaware
- Coordinates: 39.459718°N 75.745256°W
- Area: 5 acres (2.0 ha)
- Built: 1801
- Architectural style: Late Victorian, Greek Revival, Federal
- MPS: Rebuilding St. Georges Hundred 1850--1880 TR
- NRHP reference No.: 85002107
- Added to NRHP: September 13, 1985

Rosedale is a historic home located near Middletown, New Castle County, Delaware. It was built about 1801, and consists of a two-story, brick rectangular main block with a two-story rear ell. Also attached is a three-bay, one-story wing constructed of a wood siding and two wings added to the rear (south) between 1960 and 1965. It has a center hall plan. It has a slate-covered gable roof, interior end chimneys, and a front entrance with fanlight. Also on the property are a contributing hay barn, barn, and mash furnace.

It was listed on the National Register of Historic Places in 1985.
