= Weston (Middletown, Delaware) =

Historic house in Delaware, United States

- U.S. National Register of Historic Places
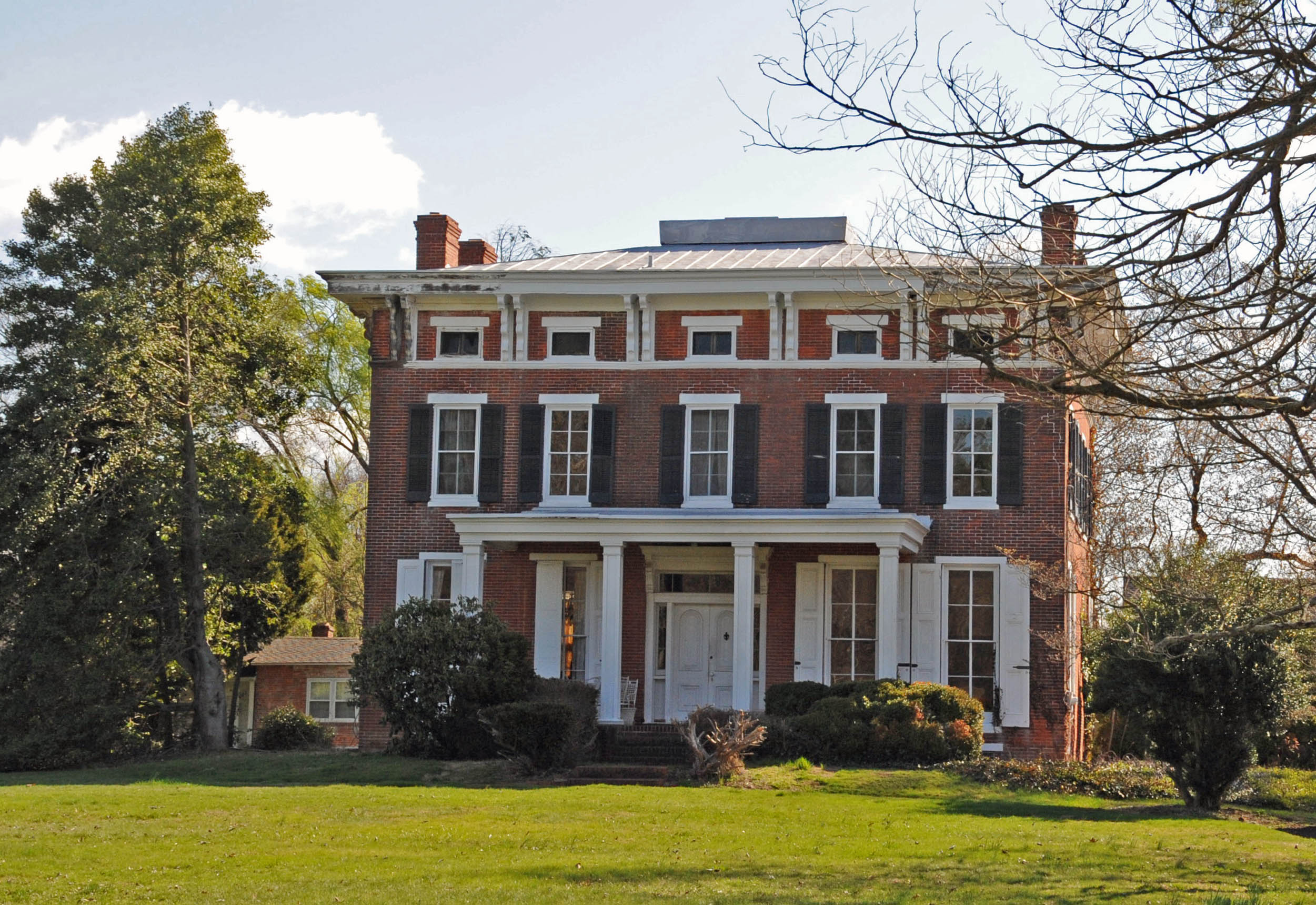

- Location within Delaware Location within the United States
- Location: 4677 Summit Bridge Road in St. Georges Hundred, near Middletown, Delaware
- Coordinates: 39.500462°N 75.709952°W
- Area: 36 acres (15 ha)
- Built: 1850
- Architectural style: Greek Revival, Italianate
- MPS: Rebuilding St. Georges Hundred 1850--1880 TR
- NRHP reference No.: 85003526
- Added to NRHP: November 19, 1985

Weston, also known as the S. Brady Farm, is a historic home and farm located near Middletown, New Castle County, Delaware. It was listed on the National Register of Historic Places in 1985.

== History ==
=== Original structure ===
The original structure was built in the early 1800s by John Clayton. Clayton was the son of Colonel Oscar Clayton, who served as secretary to Caesar Rodney, famous for having rode his horse to Philadelphia in 1776 to cast the deciding vote for Delaware for independence.

=== Additions and architectural style ===
The larger addition featured in the pictures was built about 1850, and consists of the original two-story brick farmhouse adjoining a later and larger brick three-story addition whose design displays influences of both Greek Revival and Italianate styles. It features large pairs of sawnwork brackets supporting the overhanging boxed cornice. Also on the property are a contributing icehouse, smokehouse, barn, granary, and tenant house.
