= Hazel Glen =

Former historic house in Delaware, US

- U.S. National Register of Historic Places
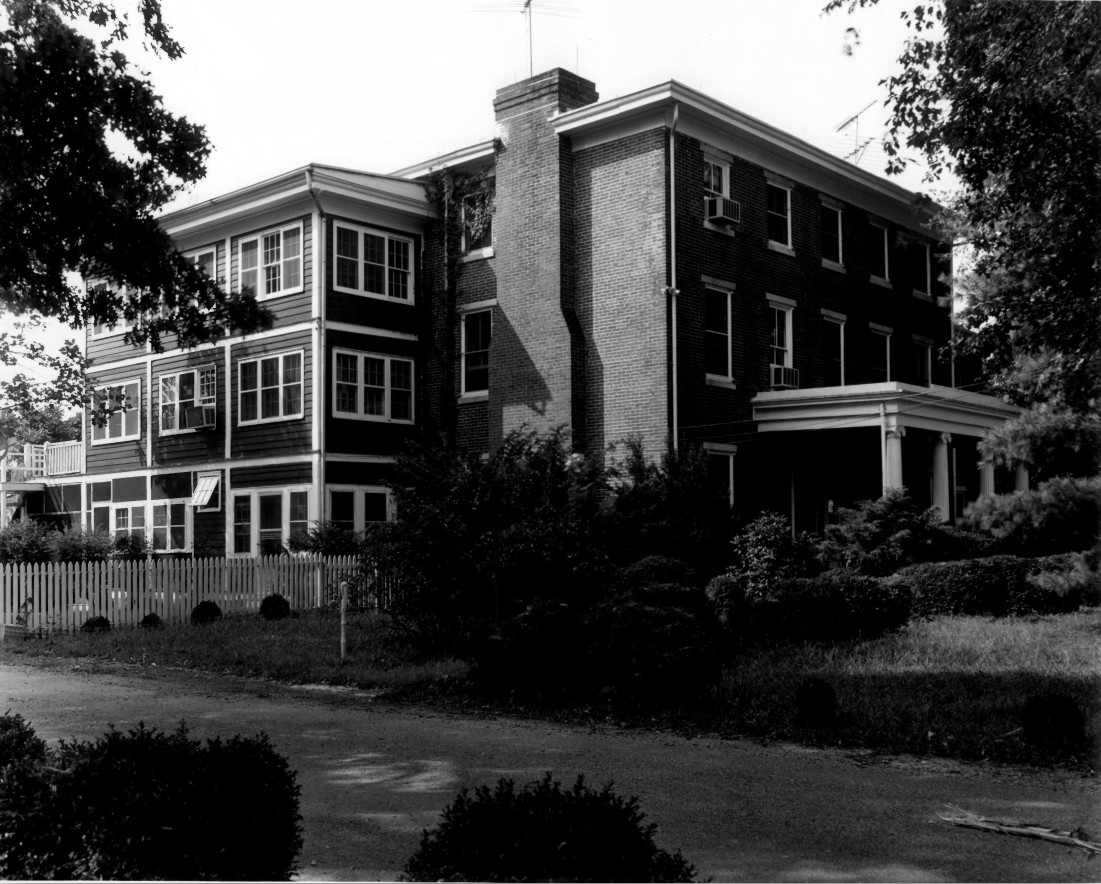
- The house in 1972

- Location within Delaware Location within the United States
- Location: 1920 Pole Bridge Road, near Port Penn, Delaware
- Coordinates: 39°30′51″N 75°36′57″W
- Area: 0.7 acres (0.28 ha)
- Built: c. 1859
- Architectural style: Italianate-Revival
- NRHP reference No.: 78000904
- Added to NRHP: November 20, 1978

Hazel Glen was a historic home located near Port Penn in New Castle County, Delaware, United States. It was built about 1859, and was a three-story, five-bay, L-shaped brick dwelling with a brick rear wing. It had a low-hipped roof (once surmounted by a cupola, three-story porches, projecting eaves, and a simple box cornice in the Italianate-Revival style. It featured a three-bay front entry porch with a flat roof supported by fluted Ionic columns.

It was listed on the National Register of Historic Places in 1978. It was demolished sometime before 1991.
