= Arnold S. Naudain House =

Historic house in Delaware, US

- U.S. National Register of Historic Places
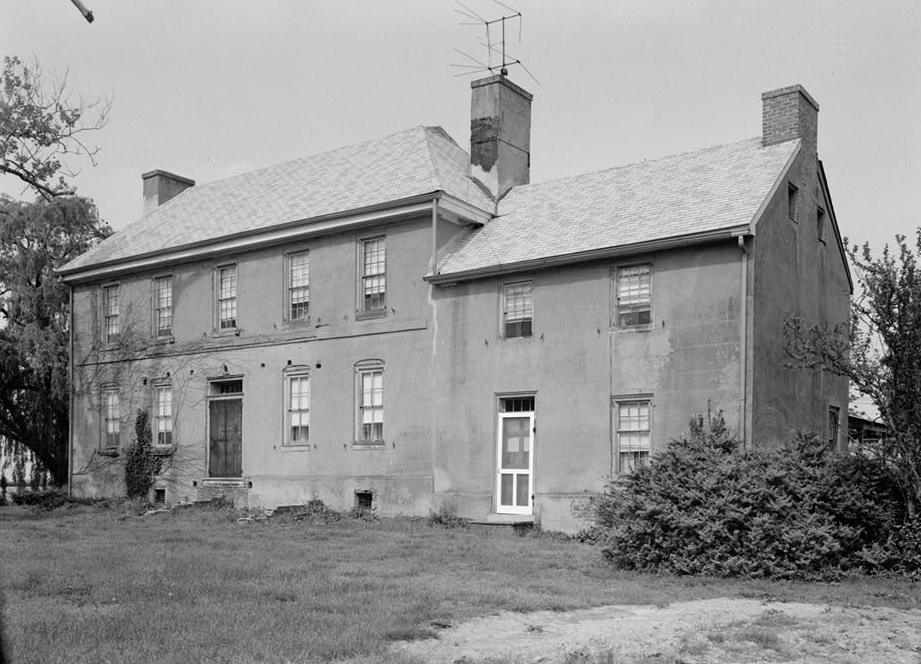
- Arnold S. Naudain House, HABS Photo, June 1960

- Location within Delaware Location within the United States
- Location: 5571 Summit Bridge Road in Appoquinimink Hundred, near Middletown, Delaware
- Coordinates: 39.420926°N 75.703536°W
- Area: 3 acres (1.2 ha)
- Built: c. 1709
- Architectural style: Georgian
- NRHP reference No.: 73000517
- Added to NRHP: April 24, 1973

Arnold S. Naudain House is a historic home located near Middletown in New Castle County, Delaware, United States. It was built about 1709, and is a 2 1/2-story, five-bay, stuccoed brick dwelling in the early Georgian style. It has a hipped roof and two-story stuccoed brick wing. Also on the property is a contributing ice house.

It was listed on the National Register of Historic Places in 1973. It is on the grounds of St. Andrew's School.
