= Noxontown =

Historic mill complex in Delaware, US

- U.S. National Register of Historic Places
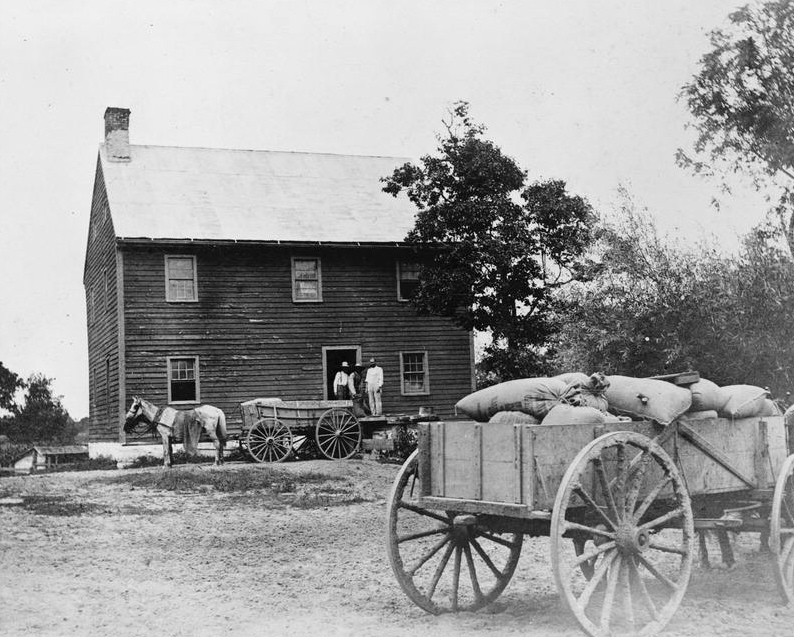
- Noxontown, Historic HABS Photo

- Location within Delaware Location within the United States
- Location: Noxontown Road, near Middletown, Delaware
- Coordinates: 39°26′9″N 75°41′2″W
- Area: 4.9 acres (2.0 ha)
- Built: c. 1740
- NRHP reference No.: 73000518
- Added to NRHP: July 2, 1973

Noxontown consists of the remaining buildings and structures associated with a country mill site and village located near Middletown in New Castle County, Delaware, United States. They are a house, small frame mill, shed, and mill dam. The house was built by Thomas Noxon about 1740, and is a 2 1/2-story, four-bay, brick dwelling with a two-story brick wing.

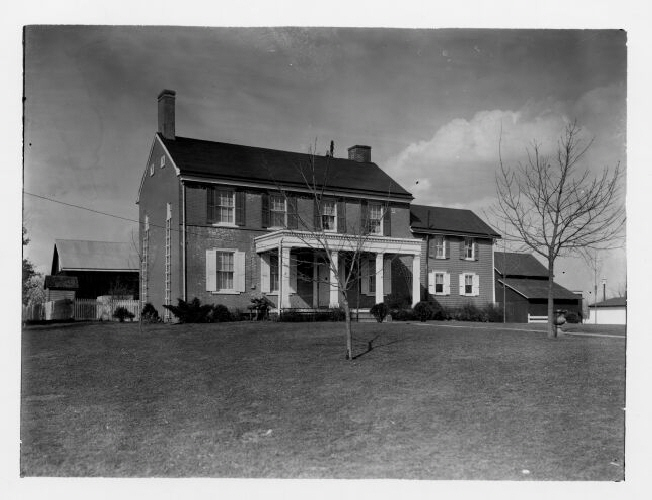
Noxon House, date unknown, Delaware State Archives

The 2 1/2-story frame mill predates the house. It measures 30 feet by 40 feet and has a metal roof. Noxontown was an important trading and milling center throughout the Colonial period. The mill was in operation as a merchant mill until 1855 and thereafter solely as a custom mill.

It was listed on the National Register of Historic Places in 1973.

All the buildings of Noxontown are now owned by St. Andrew's School.
