= Sereck Shallcross House =

Historic house in Delaware, United States

- U.S. National Register of Historic Places
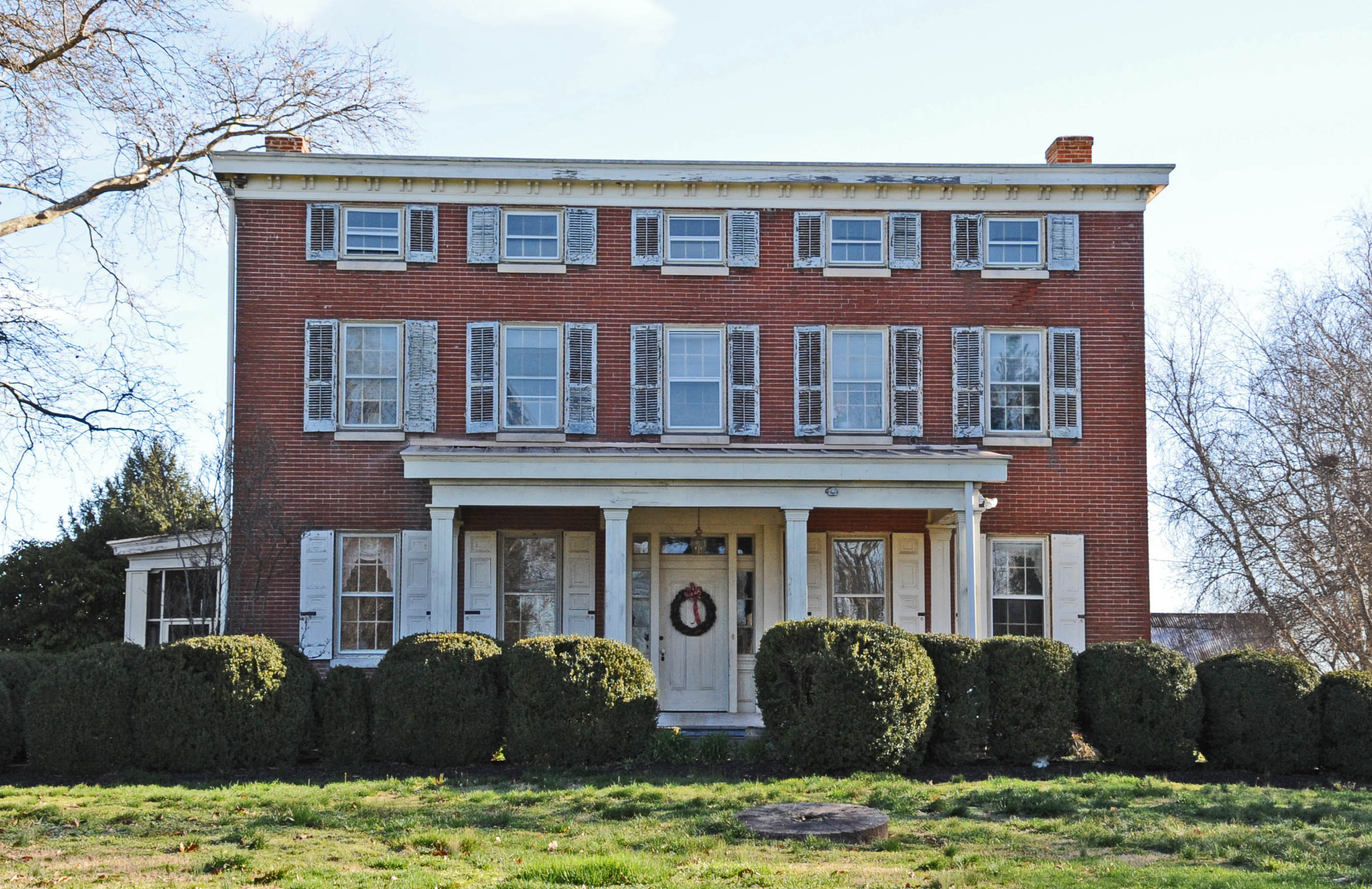

- Location within Delaware Location within the United States
- Location: 833 Marl Pit Rd. in St. Georges Hundred, near Odessa, Delaware
- Coordinates: 39.471883°N 75.690143°W
- Area: 10 acres (4.0 ha)
- Built: 1842
- Built by: Shallcross, Sereck F.
- Architectural style: Mixed (more Than 2 Styles From Different Periods)
- NRHP reference No.: 73000535
- Added to NRHP: April 3, 1973

Sereck Shallcross House, also known as Oakland, is a historic home located near Odessa, New Castle County, Delaware. It was built in 1842, and is 2 1/2-story, five-bay, brick dwelling with a flat roof. It is L-shaped, with a two-story rear wing added in the 1880s. The design is influenced by the Greek Revival, Italianate, and Georgian styles.

It was listed on the National Register of Historic Places in 1973.
