= Robert Grose House =

Historic house in Delaware, United States

- U.S. National Register of Historic Places
- Location within Delaware Location within the United States
- Location: 1000 Port Penn Rd., near Port Penn, Delaware
- Coordinates: 39°31′17″N 75°35′38″W
- Area: 1 acre (0.40 ha)
- MPS: House and Garden in Central Delaware MPS
- NRHP reference No.: 01001006
- Added to NRHP: September 21, 2001

Robert Grose House is a historic home located near Port Penn in New Castle County, Delaware, United States. It was built in the late-19th century, and is a two-story, two-bay, side-gable, one-room plan frame building with a 1 1/2-story, shed-roofed frame wing. It has an additional one-story, shed-roofed frame addition on the south elevation and a one-story, shed-roofed porch dated to the first quarter of the 20th century. The house is a typical example for a physically identifiable vernacular property type, identified as a "House and Garden".

It was listed on the National Register of Historic Places in 2001.
