= Pharo House =

Historic house in Delaware, United States

- U.S. National Register of Historic Places
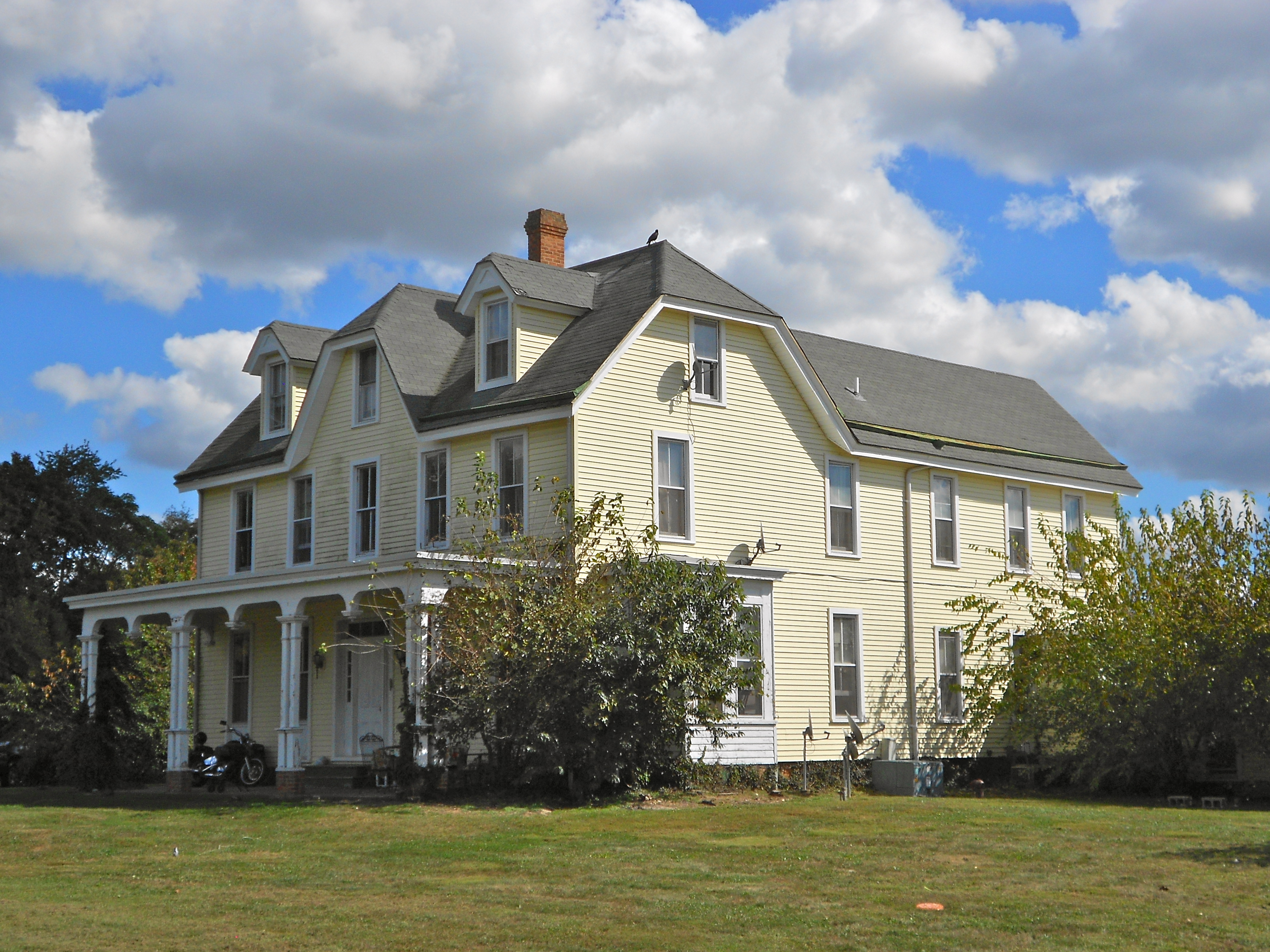
- House in 2013

- Location within Delaware Location within the United States
- Location: 100 Silver Lake Road, Middletown, Delaware
- Coordinates: 39.450242°N 75.696171°W
- Area: 10.5 acres (4.2 ha)
- Built: c. 1885
- NRHP reference No.: 84000850
- Added to NRHP: August 9, 1984

Pharo House, also known as The Pratt House, is a historic home located in Middletown, New Castle County, Delaware. It was built around 1885, and is a 2 1/2-story, five-bay L-shaped frame dwelling with a steep gable roof. It has a one-story, flat-roofed addition on the ell added in the 1940s. It features two four-window bays that project from the main block and a full-width front porch. Also on the property are the contributing granary or barn, battery house, and Big Chicken House or Breeder House.

It was listed on the National Register of Historic Places in 1984.
