= Old Ford Dairy =

Historic house in Delaware, US

- U.S. National Register of Historic Places
- Location within Delaware Location within the United States
- Location: 1871 DuPont Parkway in St. Georges Hundred, near Odessa, Delaware
- Coordinates: 39.540290°N 75.651829°W
- Area: 5 acres (2.0 ha)
- Built: c. 1850
- Architectural style: Greek Revival, Late Victorian, Federal
- MPS: Rebuilding St. Georges Hundred 1850--1880 TR
- NRHP reference No.: 85002112, 86003486 (Boundary Increase)
- Added to NRHP: September 13, 1985, December 11, 1986 (Boundary Increase)

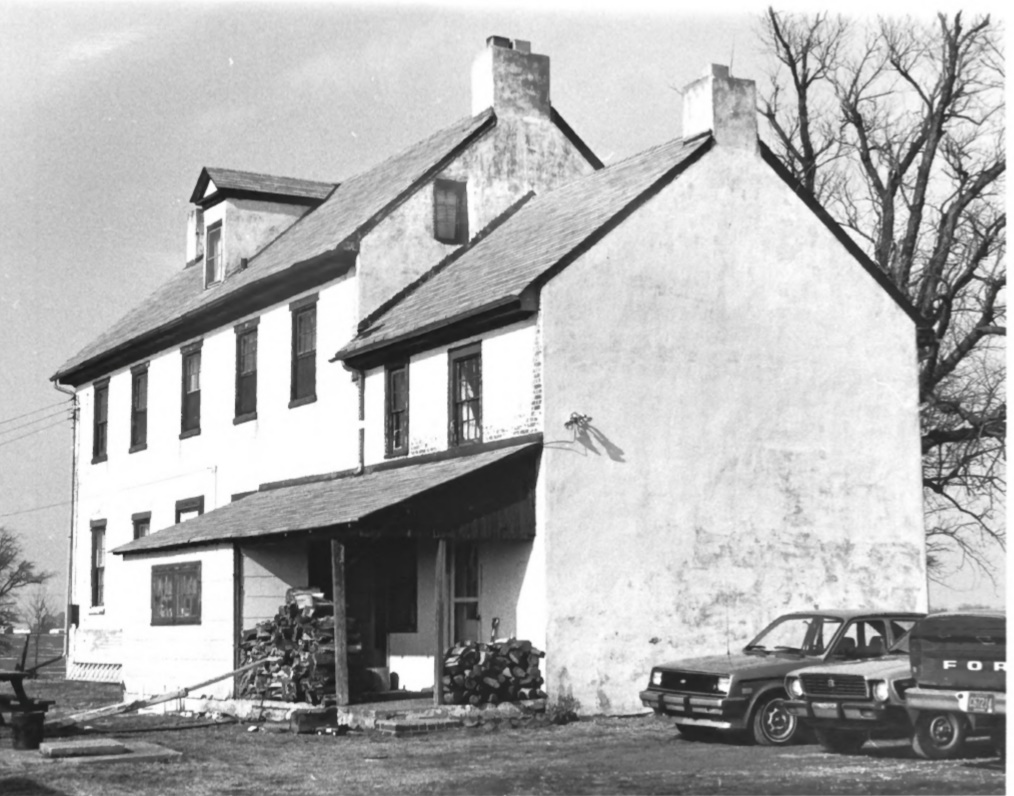

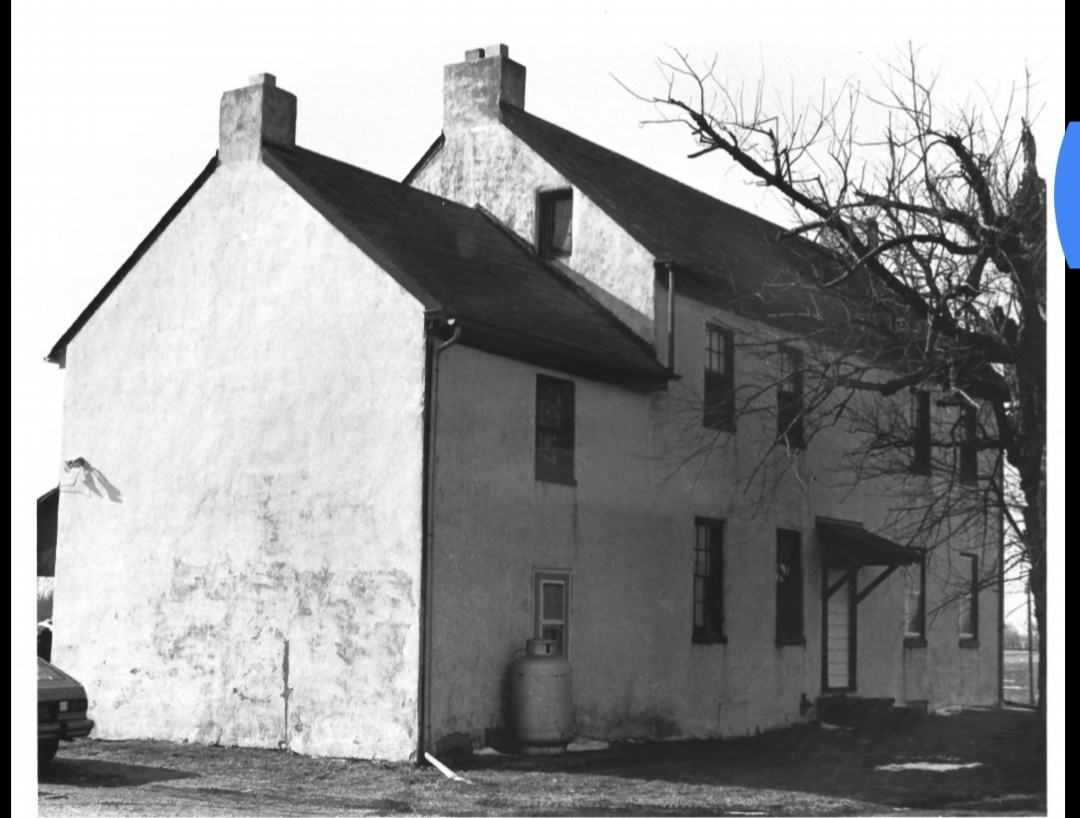

Old Ford Dairy is a historic home located near Odessa, Delaware, United States. It was built about 1850, and was a 2 1/2-story, five-bay by two-bay frame, double cross-gable, vernacular Victorian farmhouse. It had a rear wing, three-bay front porch, and two brick gable end chimneys. Also on the property were a drive through, 2 1/2-story granary, a rectangular grain storage bin, and a three-story gambrel-roofed dairy barn.

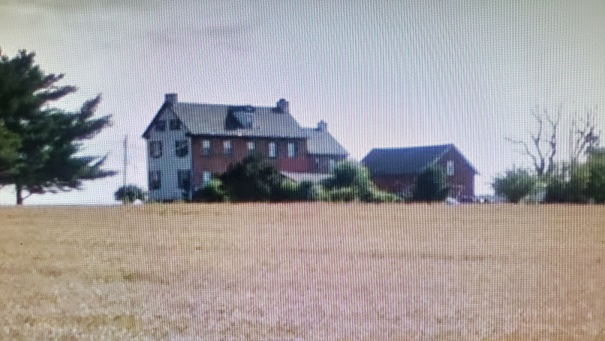

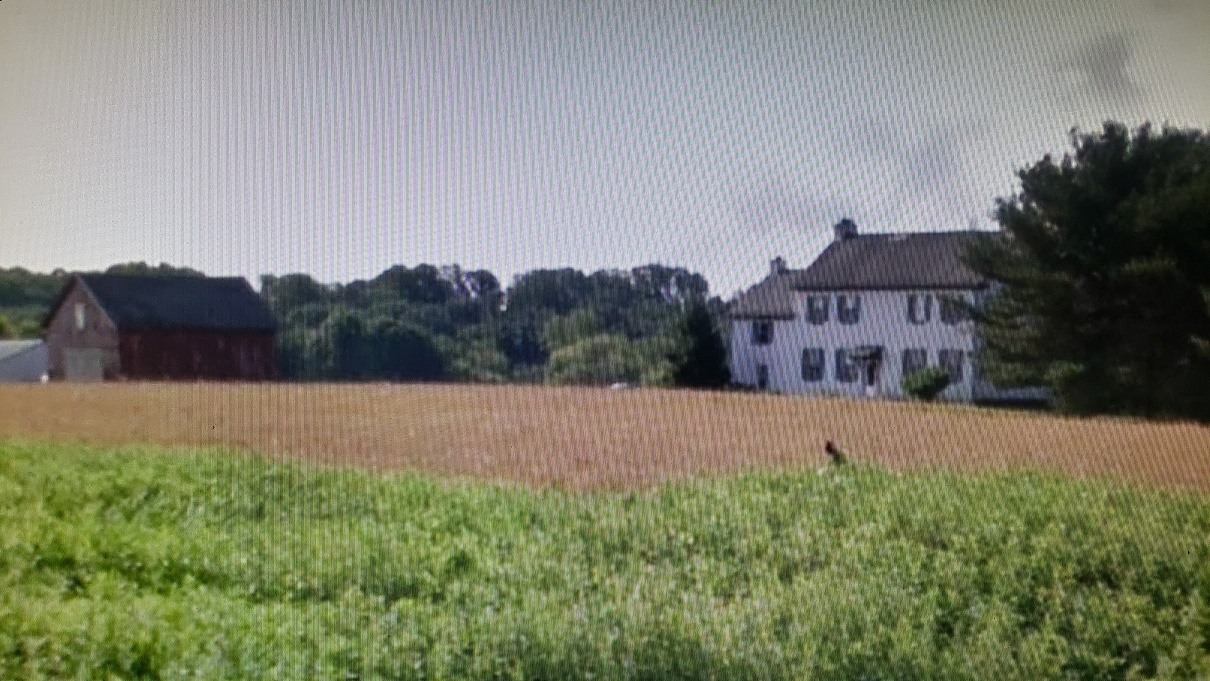

It was listed on the National Register of Historic Places in 1985.
