= Charles C. Weldon House =

Historic house in Delaware, United States

- U.S. National Register of Historic Places
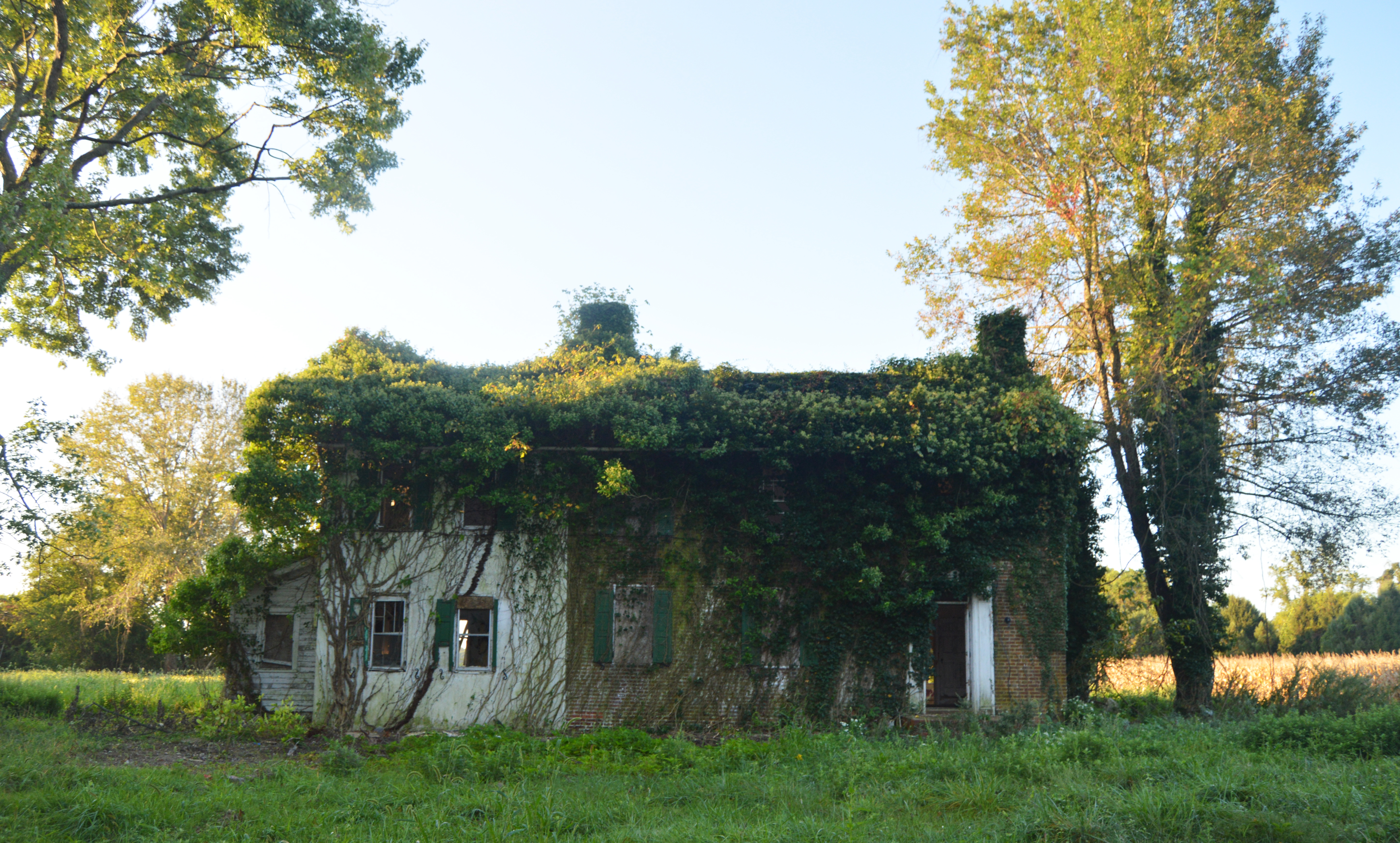

- Location within Delaware Location within the United States
- Location: Vance Neck Road, Odessa, Delaware
- Coordinates: 39°28′18″N 75°37′51″W
- Area: 5 acres (2.0 ha)
- Built: 1849
- Architectural style: Late Victorian, Greek Revival, Federal
- MPS: Rebuilding St. Georges Hundred 1850-1880 TR
- NRHP reference No.: 85002114
- Added to NRHP: September 13, 1985

The Charles C. Weldon House is a historic home located near Odessa, New Castle County, Delaware. It is a 2 1/2-story, three-bay brick dwelling with a 2 1/2-story, two-bay frame addition. It has a 2 1/2-story, parged concrete rear wing. The main block has a stepped brick cornice and two gable, end chimneys. Also on the property is a mid-19th-century granary and an early-20th-century gambrel-roofed barn.

It was listed on the National Register of Historic Places in 1985. The nomination referred to it as the "J. Vandegrift House" or "High Hook Farm", names for an adjacent farm not on the National Register.

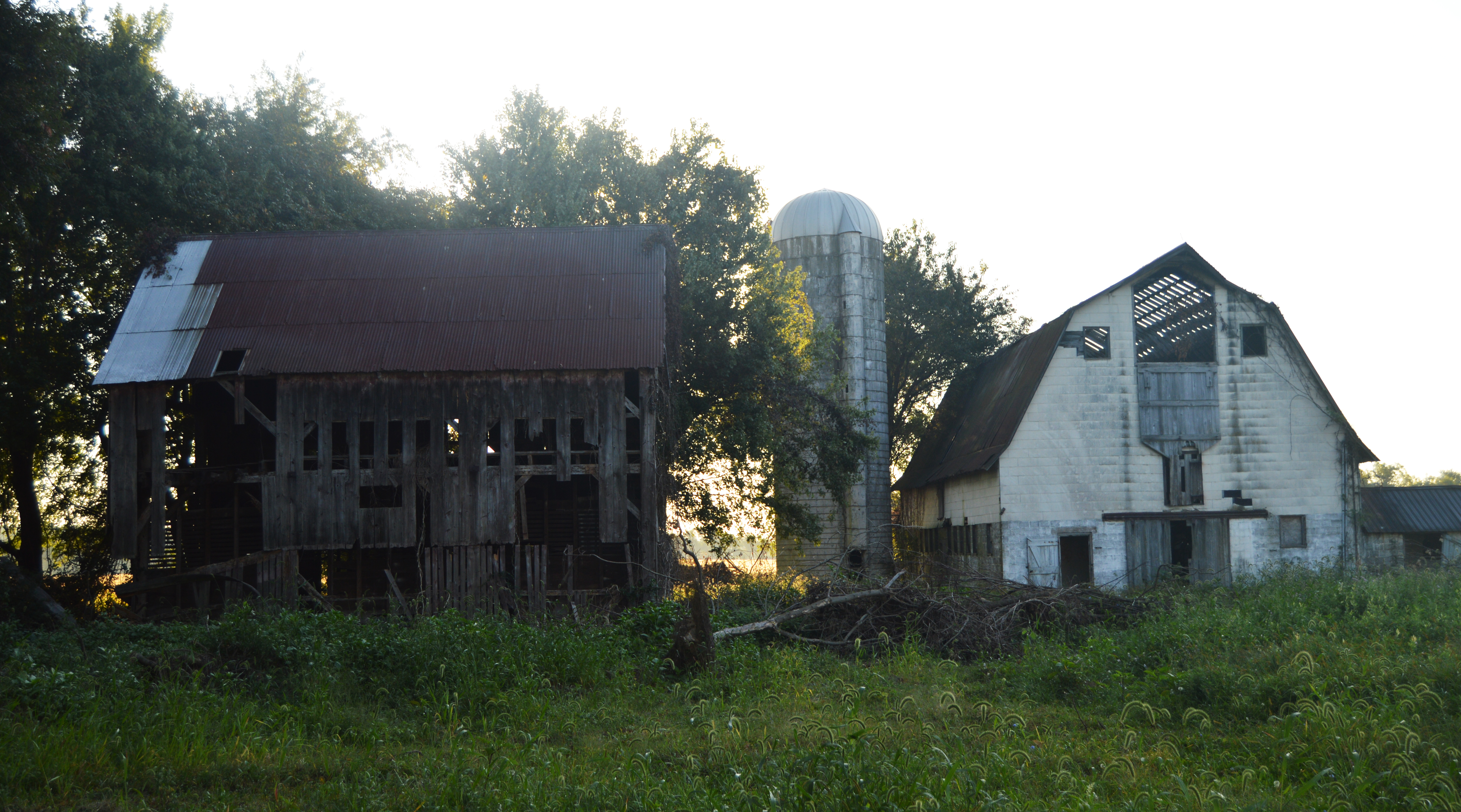
Granary and barn
