= Hill Island Farm =

Historic house in Delaware, US

- U.S. National Register of Historic Places
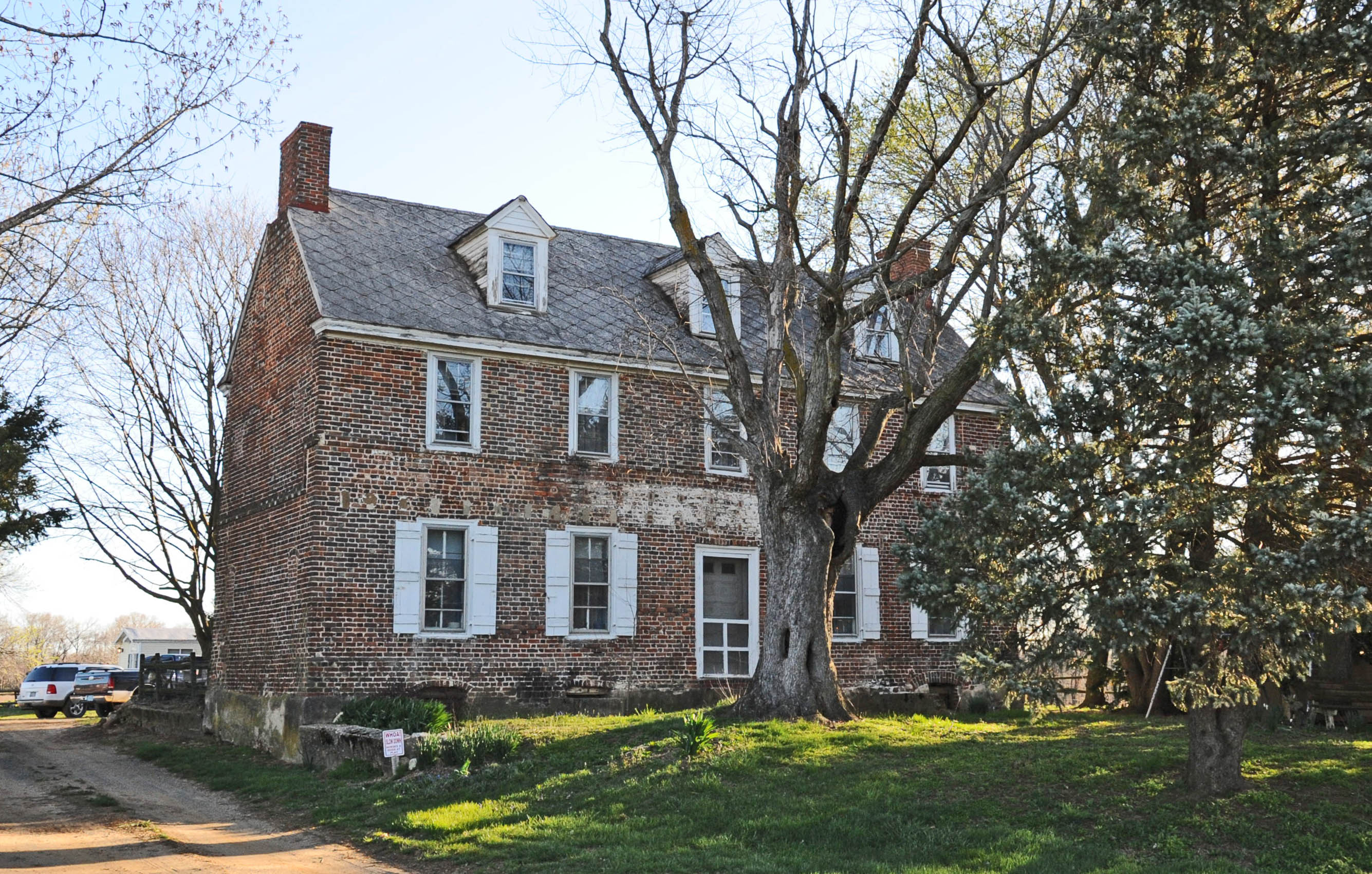

- Location within Delaware Location within the United States
- Location: 3379 Harris Rd., Townsend, Delaware
- Coordinates: 39.434291°N 75.667190°W
- Area: 4 acres (1.6 ha)
- Built: c. 1790
- Architectural style: Federal
- MPS: Dwellings of the Rural Elite in Central Delaware MPS
- NRHP reference No.: 92001139
- Added to NRHP: September 11, 1992

Hill Island Farm, also known as Noxontown Farm, is a historic home located in Townsend within New Castle County, Delaware, United States. It was built about 1790, and is a 2 1/2-story, five-bay brick dwelling with interior brick chimneys at both gable ends. It has a gable roof with dormers. The house measures approximately 48 feet by 19 feet and has a center passage plan. It is in the Federal style.

It was listed on the National Register of Historic Places in 1992.
