= Choptank-Upon-The-Hill =

Historic house in Delaware, US

- U.S. National Register of Historic Places
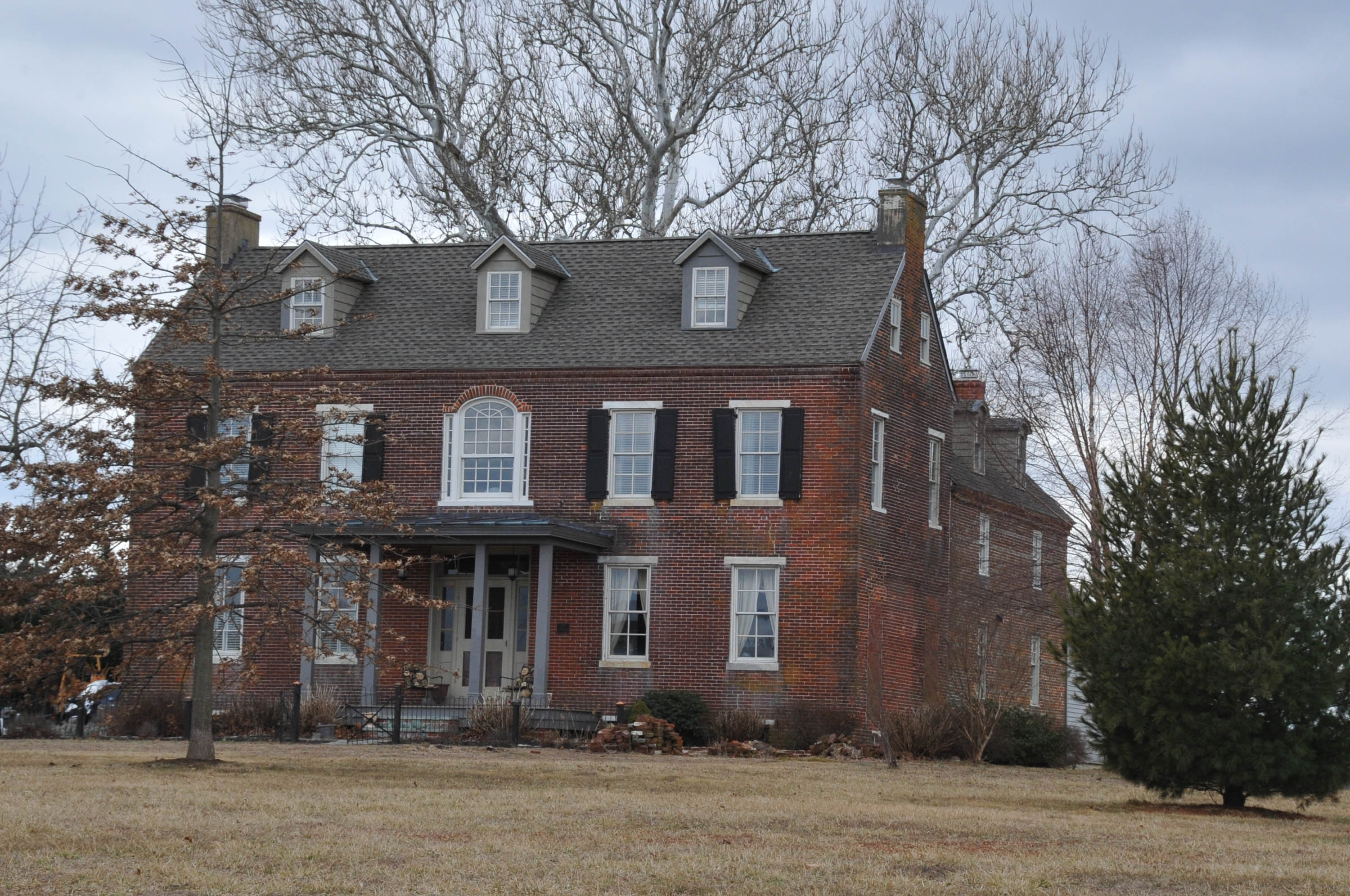
- Front and side of Choptank-Upon-The-Hill

- Location within Delaware Location within the United States
- Location: 121 Colonel Clayton Drive in St. Georges Hundred, near Middletown, Delaware
- Coordinates: 39.496693°N 75.747019°W
- Area: 0.5 acres (0.20 ha)
- Built: c. 1820
- MPS: Rebuilding St. Georges Hundred 1850-1880 TR
- NRHP reference No.: 85003528
- Added to NRHP: November 19, 1985

Choptank-Upon-The-Hill is a historic home located near Middletown in New Castle County, Delaware, United States. It was built about 1820, and is a 2 1/2-story, five-bay, brick house with a 2 1/2-story brick ell. The addition was built about 1840–50. The house features a Palladian window above the front facade, a gable roof with dormers, and interior gable end chimney piles.

It was listed on the National Register of Historic Places in 1985.
