= Huguenot House =

Historic house in Delaware, US

- U.S. National Register of Historic Places
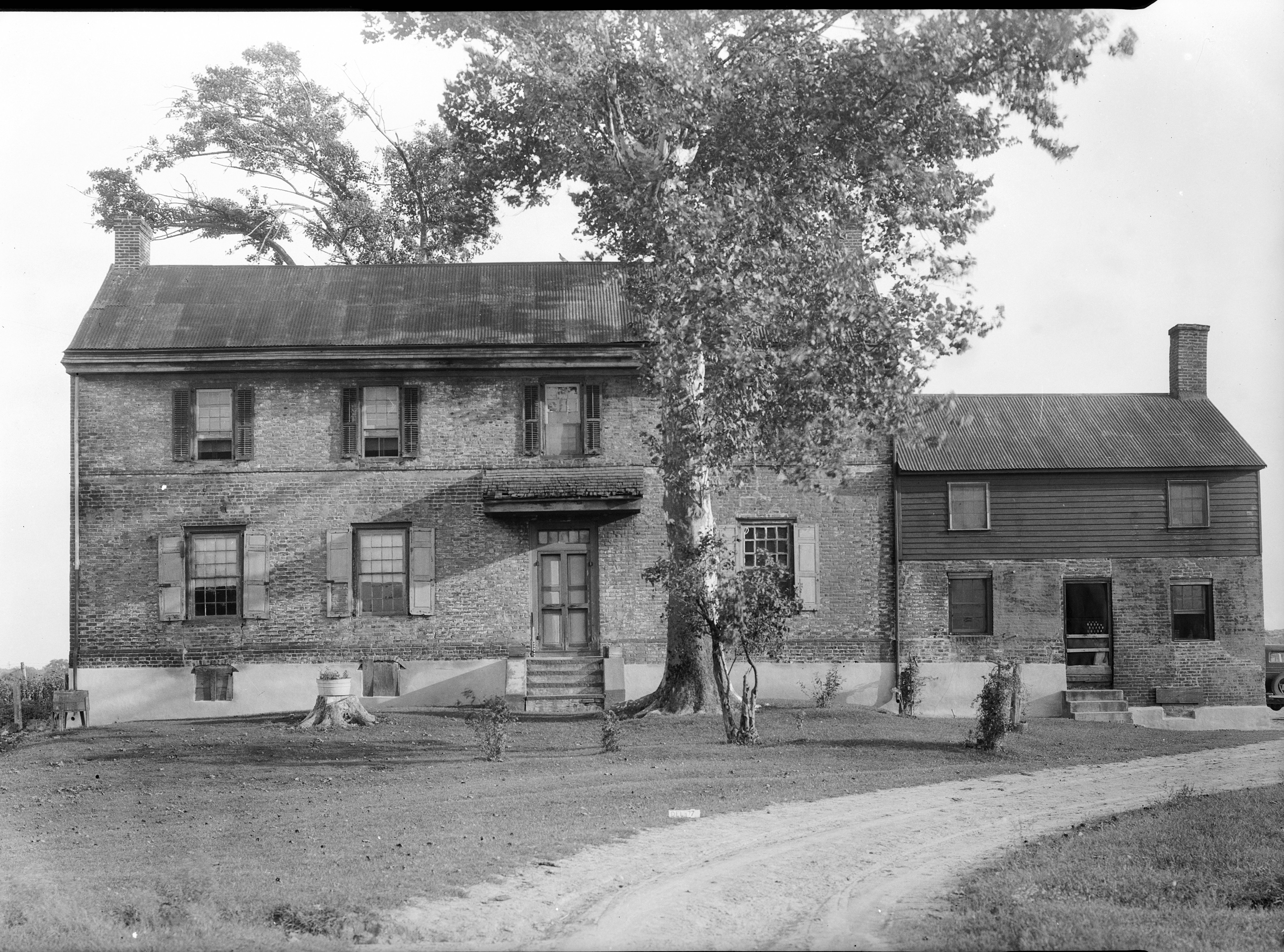
- Huguenot House, HABS Photo, October 1936

- Location within Delaware Location within the United States
- Location: 798 Taylors Bridge Road, Taylors Bridge, Delaware
- Coordinates: 39.400454°N 75.615802°W
- Area: 5 acres (2.0 ha)
- Built: c. 1735
- NRHP reference No.: 73000545
- Added to NRHP: March 20, 1973

Huguenot House, also known as Homestead Farm and Naudain House, is a historic home located at Taylors Bridge in New Castle County, Delaware, United States. Historical records from the 19th century suggest it was built about 1711 and certainly before 1725. It is a two-story, four bay brick dwelling with a gable roof. It has a 2-story, brick addition, which was at one time a separate kitchen. The house is being restored to its original state by its current owners.

It was listed on the National Register of Historic Places in 1973.
