= Vandyke-Heath House =

Historic house in Delaware, United States

- U.S. National Register of Historic Places
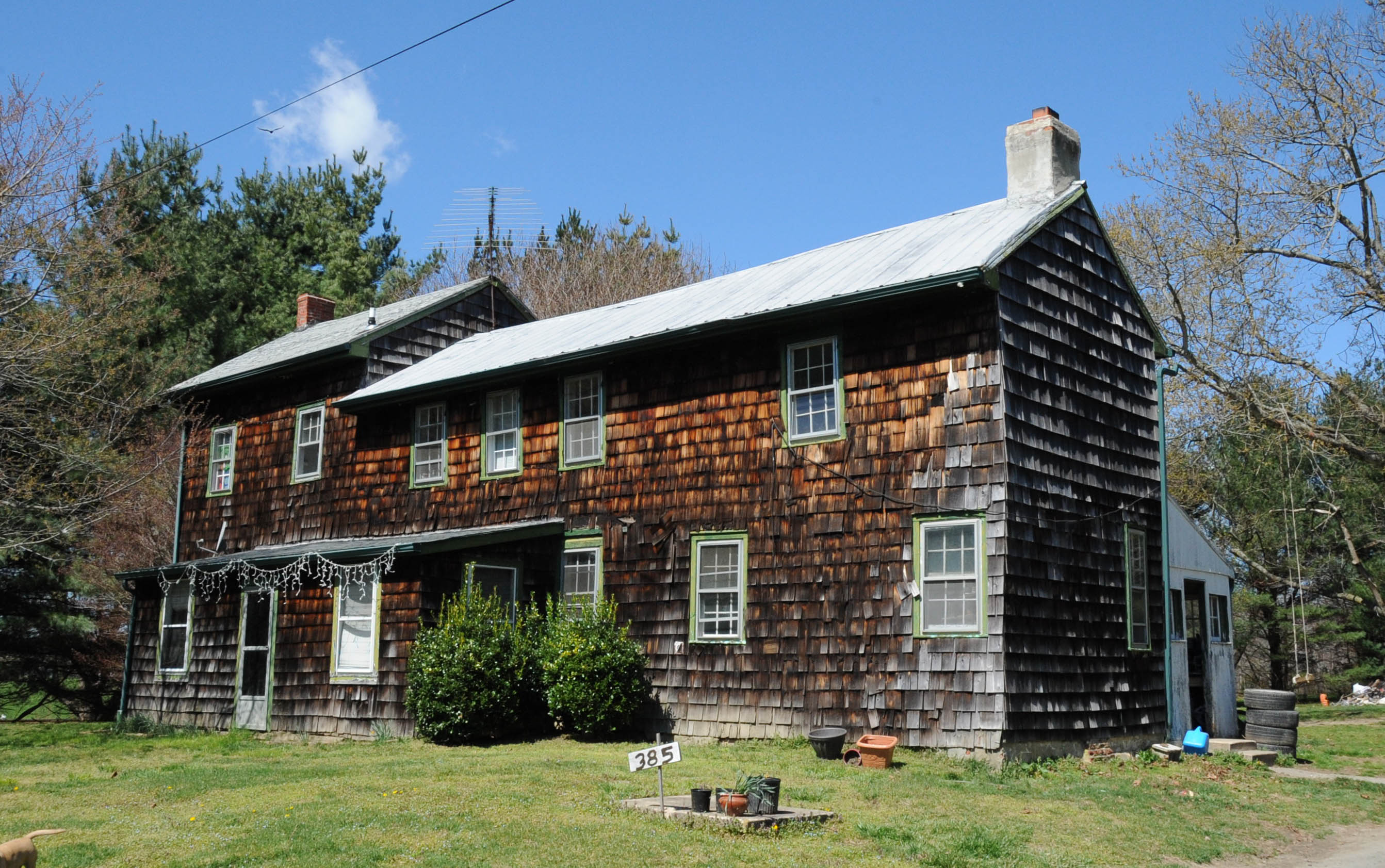

- Location within Delaware Location within the United States
- Location: 385 Vandyke Greenspring Road, near Townsend, Delaware
- Coordinates: 39°21′26″N 75°44′53″W
- Area: 3 acres (1.2 ha)
- Architectural style: Federal
- MPS: Dwellings of the Rural Elite in Central Delaware MPS
- NRHP reference No.: 92001130
- Added to NRHP: September 11, 1992

Vandyke-Heath House, also known as the Jacob C. Vandyke House, is a historic home located near Townsend, New Castle County, Delaware. The house was built in three stages. The earliest section dates to the late-18th century, and was a 1 1/2-story, three bay log structure measuring 16 feet by 21 feet. It was raised to a full two stories in the mid-19th century and a 2 1/2-story, two-bay frame wing was added. A two-story, two bay addition was built in the late-19th century. It is in the Federal style.

It was listed on the National Register of Historic Places in 1992.

On November 2, 2017, the structure suffered significant fire damage due to arson. As a result, it was demolished in 2020.
