= Achmester =

Former historic house in Delaware, US

- U.S. National Register of Historic Places
- U.S. Historic district
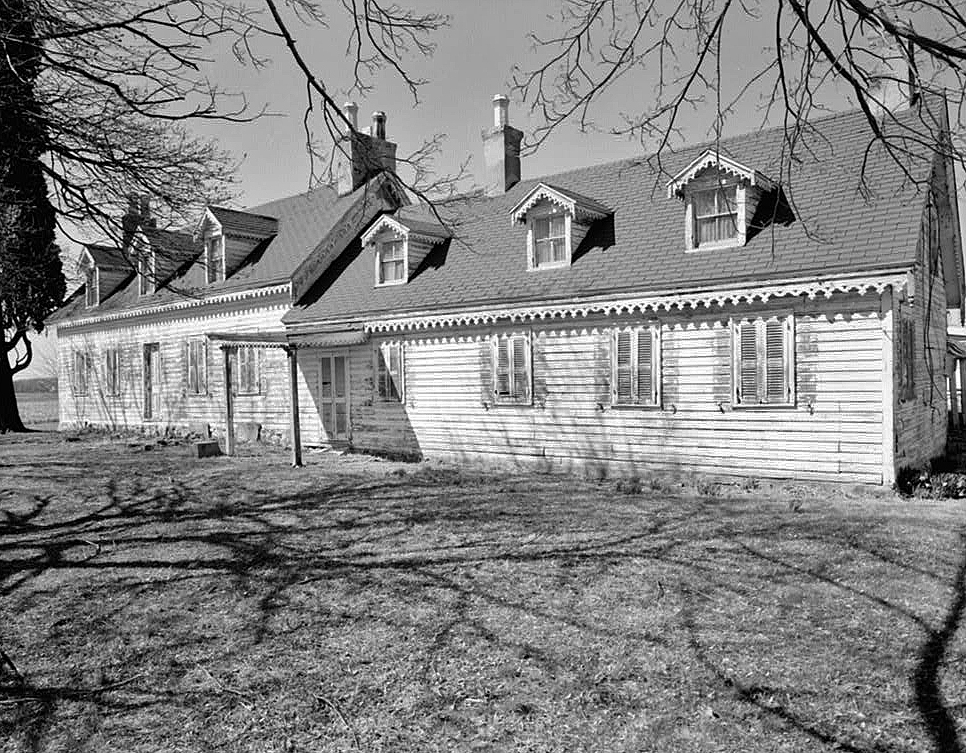
- Achmester in 1983

- Location within Delaware Location within the United States
- Location: 617 Marl Pit Road in St Georges Hundred, near Middletown, Delaware
- Coordinates: 39.48083°N 75.70976°W
- Area: 210 acres (85 ha)
- Built: 1829
- Built by: MacFarlane, Robert & John
- Architectural style: Center Passage Plan
- NRHP reference No.: 79000626
- Added to NRHP: December 28, 1979

Achmester was a historic home and national historic district located near Middletown, New Castle County, Delaware. It encompassed four contributing buildings and two contributing structures. Achmester was built in 1829, and was a 1 1/2-story, single pile "Peach Mansion." It consisted of a five bay frame main block with a five bay gable end addition, and five bay rear service ell. It had a gable roof with dormers and sat on a stone foundation. The façade featured simple box cornices and dormers decorated at a later date with Gothic Revival sawnwork trim, pendents, and vergeboards. The contributing outbuildings consist of a cow barn, shed, milk house, granary, and smokehouse. It was built by Richard Mansfield, a founder of Middletown Academy.

It was listed on the National Register of Historic Places in 1979. It was demolished in 2022.

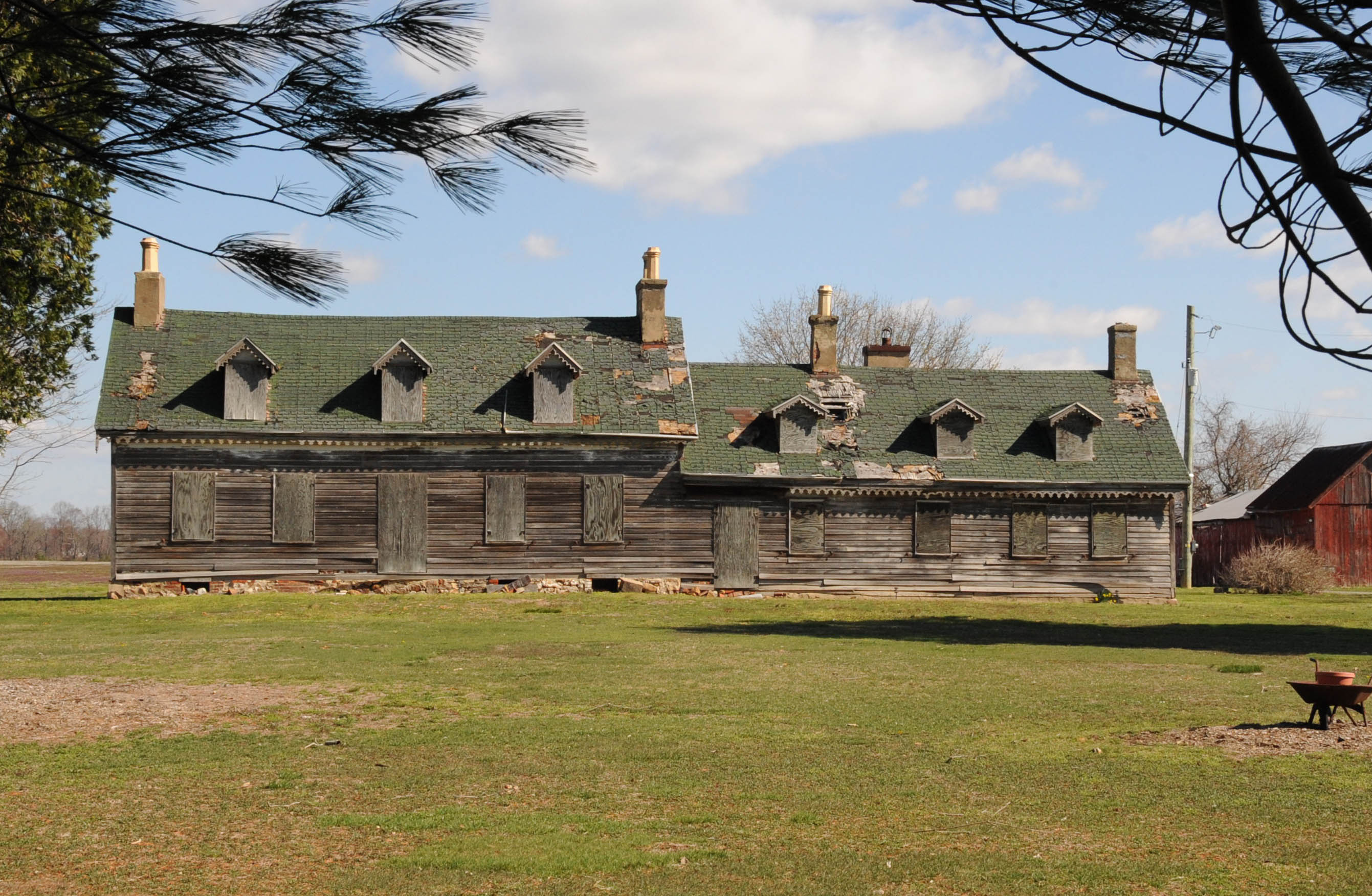
House in 2016
