= S. Holton Farm =

Historic house in Delaware, US

- U.S. National Register of Historic Places
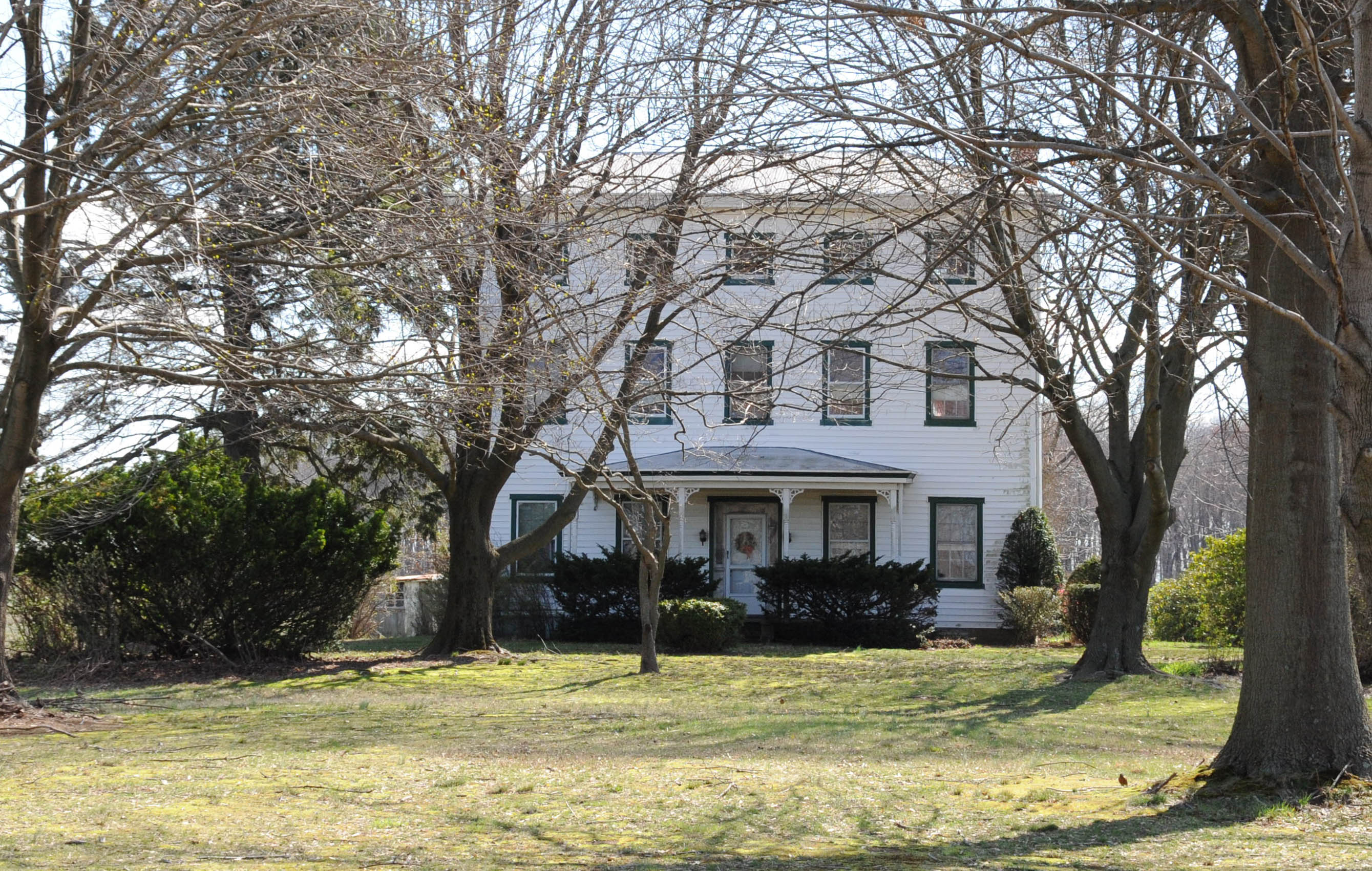

- Location within Delaware Location within the United States
- Location: 2010 Choptank Road in St. Georges Hundred, Middletown, Delaware
- Coordinates: 39.471642°N 75.736169°W
- Area: 5 acres (2.0 ha)
- Built: c. 1850
- Architectural style: Late Victorian, Greek Revival, Georgian
- MPS: Rebuilding St. Georges Hundred 1850-1880 TR
- NRHP reference No.: 85002105
- Added to NRHP: September 13, 1985

S. Holton Farm is a historic home located near Middletown in New Castle County, Delaware, United States. It was built about 1850, and is a three-story ell-shaped frame dwelling with a two-story rear ell in the Greek Revival idiom and Georgian "I"-form. It has a five bay front facade, and shallow-pitched hipped roof with two square brick chimneys. Also on the property are a contributing granary and two milkhouses.

It was listed on the National Register of Historic Places in 1985.
