= Misty Vale =

Historic house in Delaware, US

- U.S. National Register of Historic Places
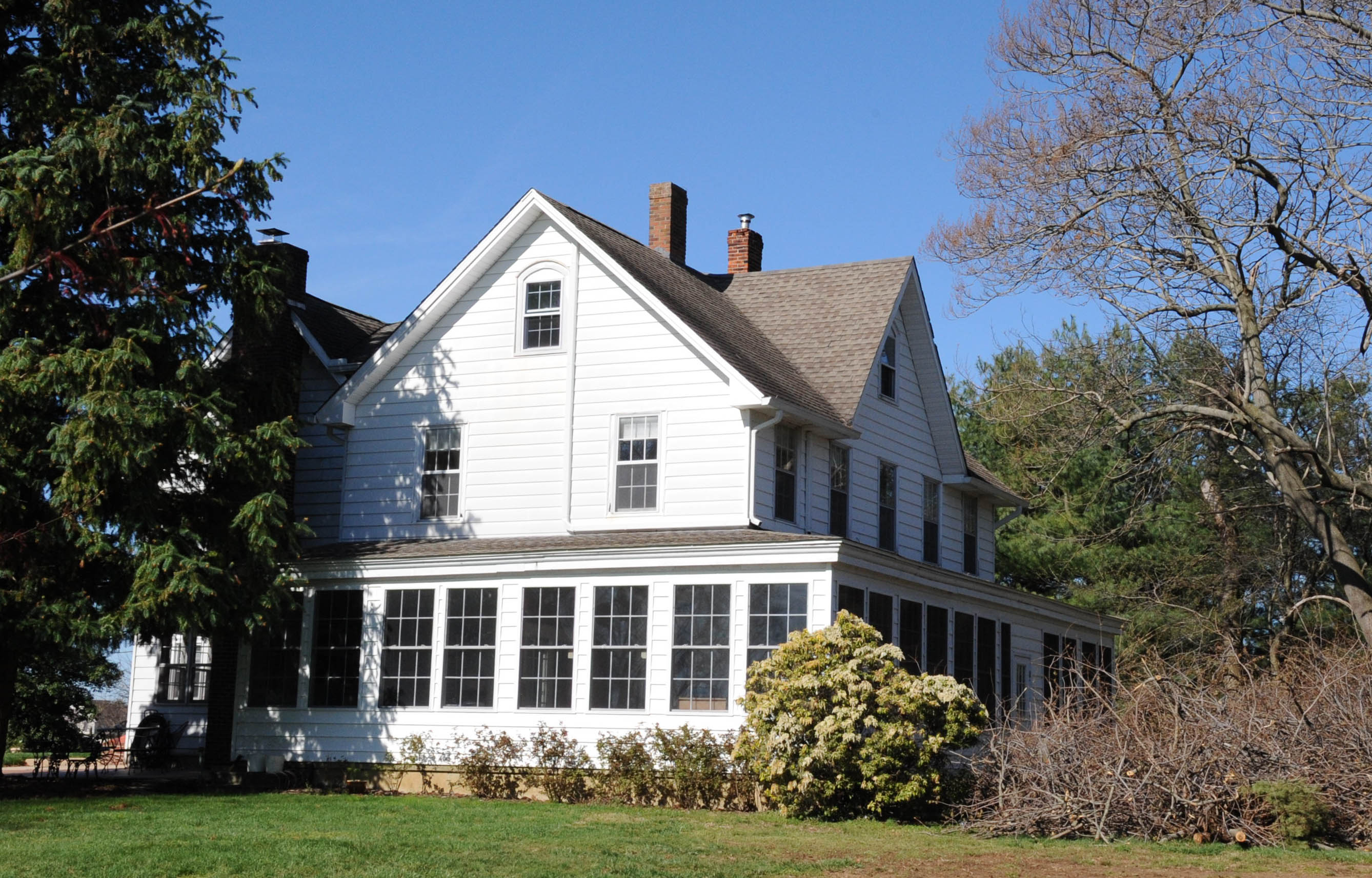

- Location within Delaware Location within the United States
- Location: 216 Manchester Way in St. Georges Hundred, near Odessa, Delaware
- Coordinates: 39.488894°N 75.639342°W
- Area: 7 acres (2.8 ha)
- Built: c. 1850
- Architectural style: Late Victorian, Greek Revival, Federal
- MPS: Rebuilding St. Georges Hundred 1850-1880 TR
- NRHP reference No.: 85002111
- Added to NRHP: September 13, 1985

Misty Vale, also known as the G. W. Karsner House, is a historic home located near Odessa in New Castle County, Delaware, United States. It was built about 1850, and is a 2 1/2-story, five-bay frame, cross-gable roof house built in a vernacular Victorian style. It has a frame, three-bay, gable-roofed wing, a hipped-roof, frame addition to the east and an enclosed porch. Also on the property are a square, 1 1/2-story, hipped roof, drive-through granary with a cupola on top and two barns.

It was listed on the National Register of Historic Places in 1985.
