= Windsor (Port Penn, Delaware) =

Historic house in Delaware, United States

- U.S. National Register of Historic Places
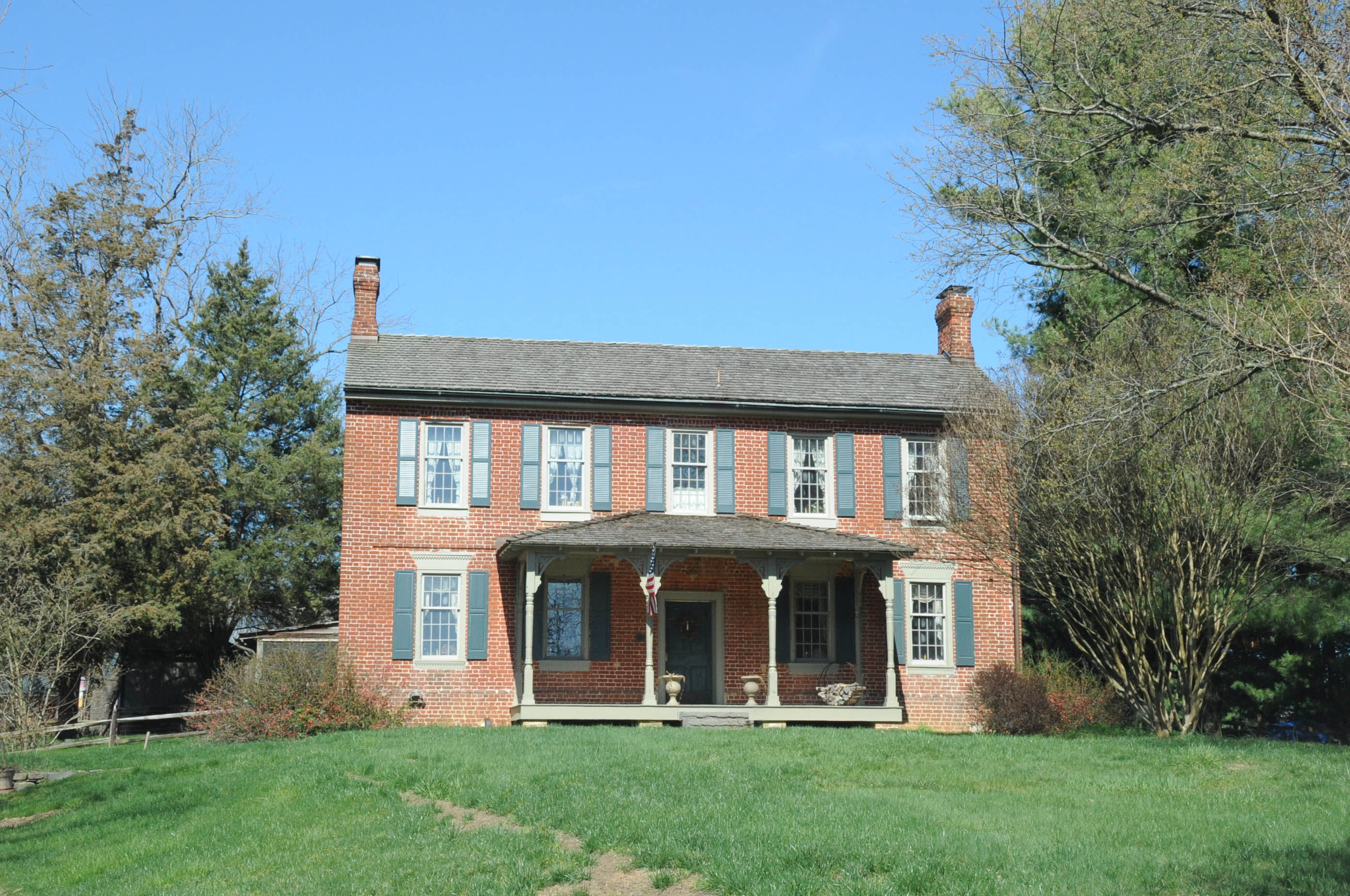

- Location within Delaware Location within the United States
- Location: 1060 Dutch Neck Rd. in St. Georges Hundred, near Port Penn, Delaware
- Coordinates: 39°32′48″N 75°36′53″W
- Area: 3 acres (1.2 ha)
- Architectural style: Federal
- MPS: Dwellings of the Rural Elite in Central Delaware MPS
- NRHP reference No.: 92001131
- Added to NRHP: September 11, 1992

Windsor, also known as Annondale, is a historic home located near Port Penn in New Castle County, Delaware, USA. It was built about 1760, and is a two-story, five-bay, gable-roof, brick building with interior brick chimneys at each gable end. It has a center-passage plan with overall dimensions of 45 feet wide by 19 feet deep. A two-story, wood-frame kitchen wing abuts the rear of the main house. The front facade features a hipped-roof frame porch added in the late-19th century. It is in the Federal style.

It was listed on the National Register of Historic Places in 1992.
