= Philip Reading Tannery =

Historic building in Delaware, US

- U.S. National Register of Historic Places
- Location within Delaware Location within the United States
- Location: 201 E. Main St., Middletown, Delaware
- Coordinates: 39°27′2″N 75°42′44″W
- Area: 2 acres (0.81 ha)
- Built: c. 1780
- Demolished: July 31, 1993
- NRHP reference No.: 78000897
- Added to NRHP: April 26, 1978

Philip Reading Tannery, also known as Green's Barn, was a historic tannery building located at Middletown, New Castle County, Delaware. It was built c. 1780, and is a two-story, brick structure measuring 106 feet long by 30 feet wide. It was a rare surviving 18th-century industrial building that hadbeen converted into a cow barn.

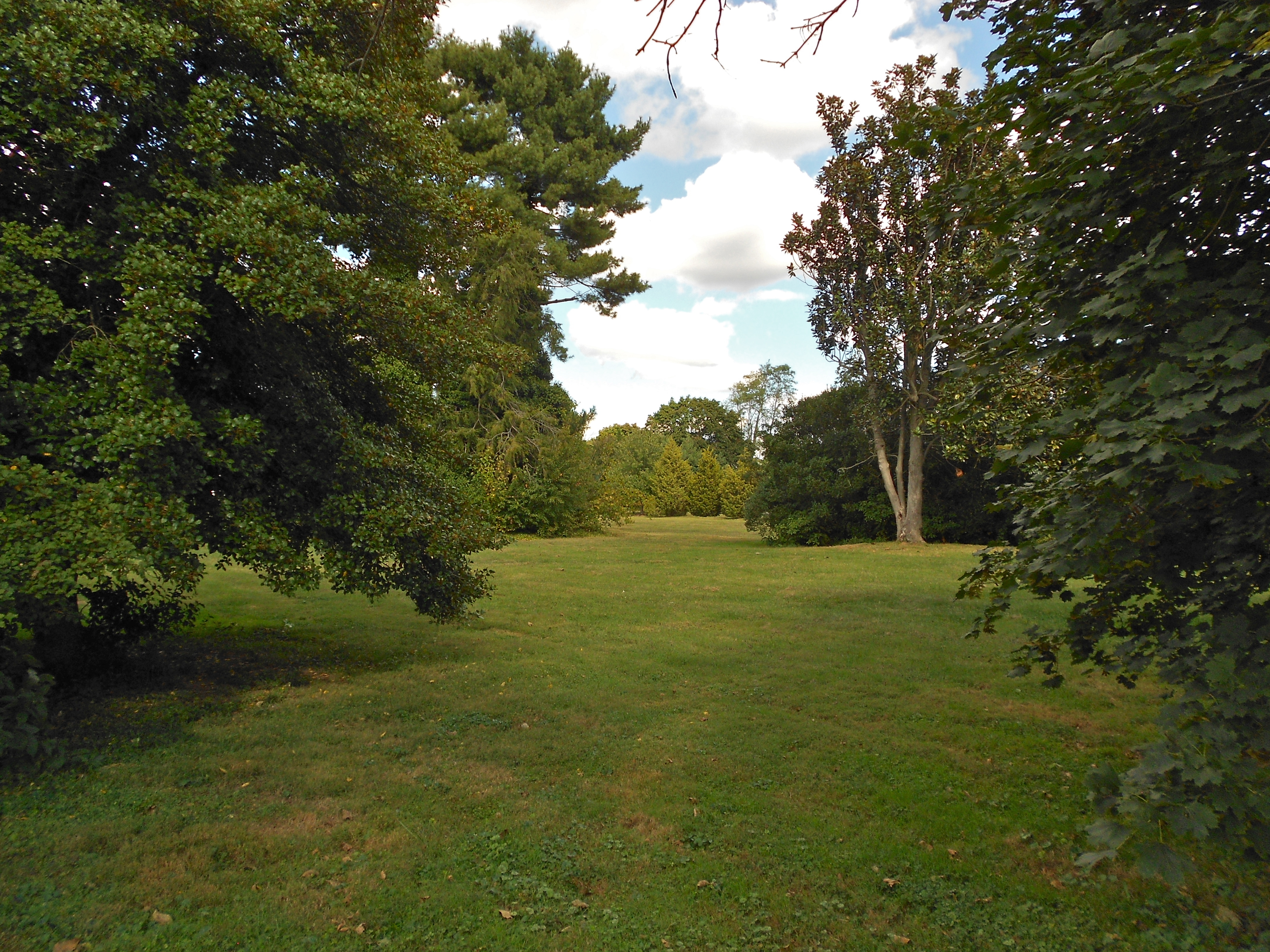
Empty lot at 201 E. Main in Middletown in 2013. The tannery appears to have been demolished.

It was listed on the National Register of Historic Places in 1978.

On July 4, 1993, the building suffered an extensive fire. It was demolished on July 31st of that year.
