= David W. Thomas House =

Historic house in Delaware, United States

- U.S. National Register of Historic Places
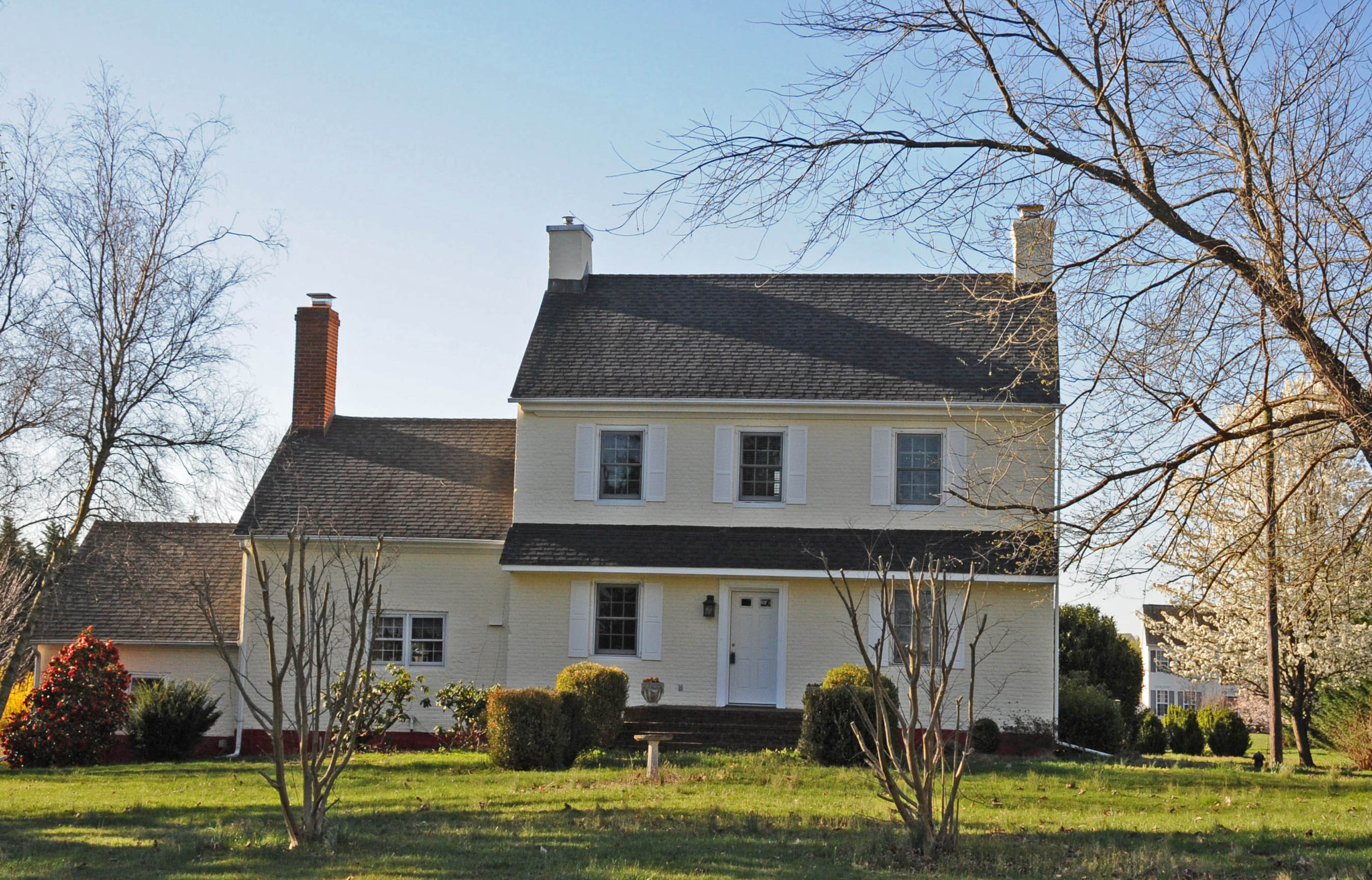

- Location within Delaware Location within the United States
- Location: 326 Thomas Landing Rd. in Appoquinimink Hundred, near Odessa, Delaware
- Coordinates: 39°26′45″N 75°37′38″W
- Area: 3 acres (1.2 ha)
- Built: 1820
- Architectural style: Federal
- MPS: Dwellings of the Rural Elite in Central Delaware MPS
- NRHP reference No.: 92001136
- Added to NRHP: September 11, 1992

David W. Thomas House is a historic home located near Odessa, New Castle County, Delaware. It was built about 1820 and is a two-story, three-bay brick dwelling with interior brick chimneys at both gable ends. It has a gable roof with dormers. There is a contemporary kitchen wing with a laundry room addition. The house measures approximately 32 feet by 19 feet and has a hall and parlor plan. It is in the Federal style. Also on the property is a contributing 19th century ice house.

It was listed on the National Register of Historic Places in 1992.
