= Dilworth House =

Historic house in Delaware, US

- U.S. National Register of Historic Places
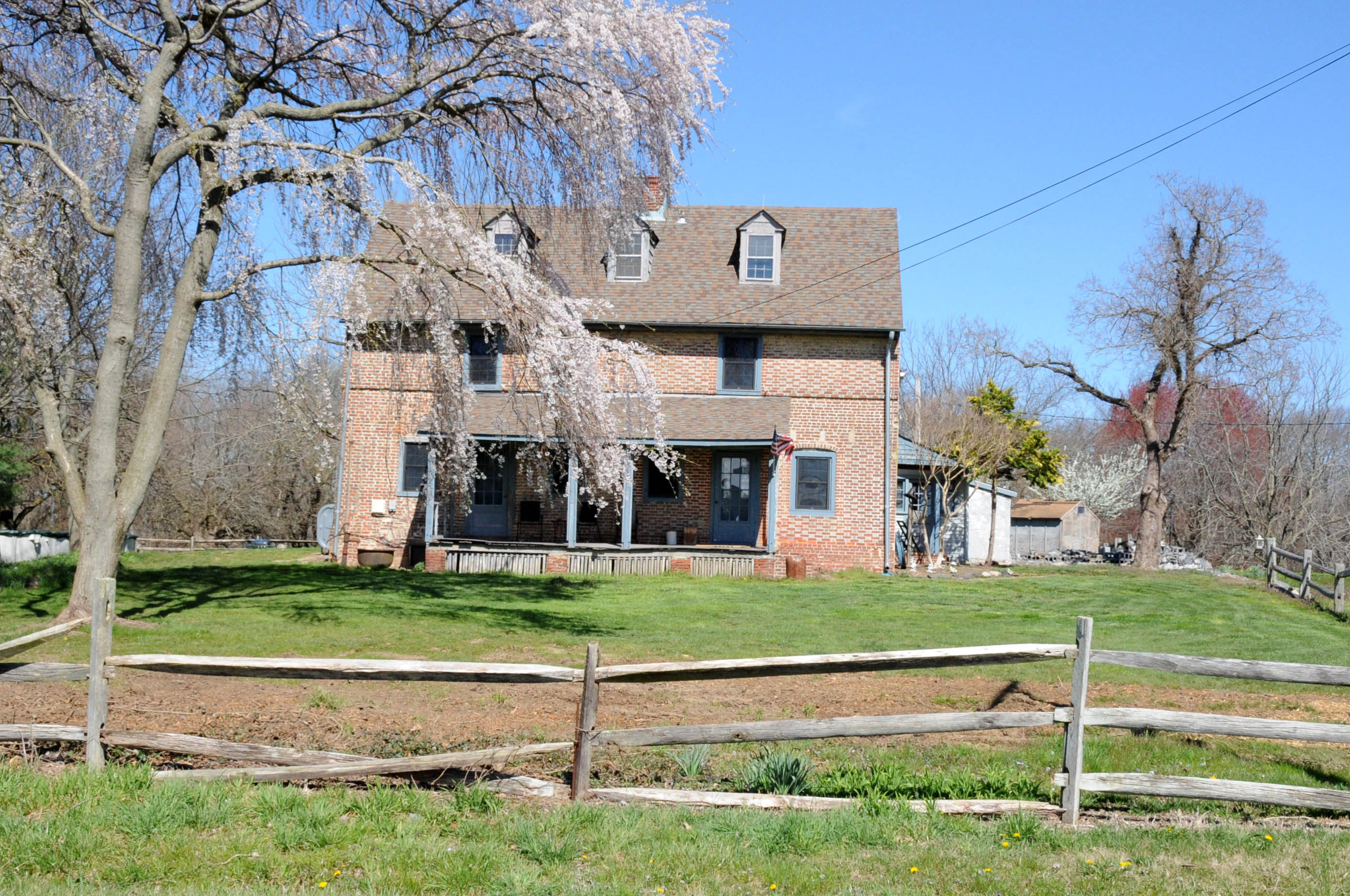

- Location within Delaware Location within the United States
- Location: Off Delaware Route 9, Port Penn, Delaware
- Coordinates: 39°31′5″N 75°36′17″W
- Area: 5 acres (2.0 ha)
- NRHP reference No.: 73000538
- Added to NRHP: November 27, 1973

Dilworth House is a historic home in Port Penn, Delaware, United States. The earliest section of the house dates to the late 17th century. It was built in two sections, the west section being the oldest. It consists of two separate, 2 1/2-story brick sections, each three bays wide. The house features diapered brickwork. A frame rear wing was added in the second half of the 19th century. The Dilworth House is a rare surviving specimen of an early Delaware yeoman's house.

It was listed on the National Register of Historic Places in 1973.
