= Duncan Beard Site =

Archaeological site in Delaware, US

- U.S. National Register of Historic Places
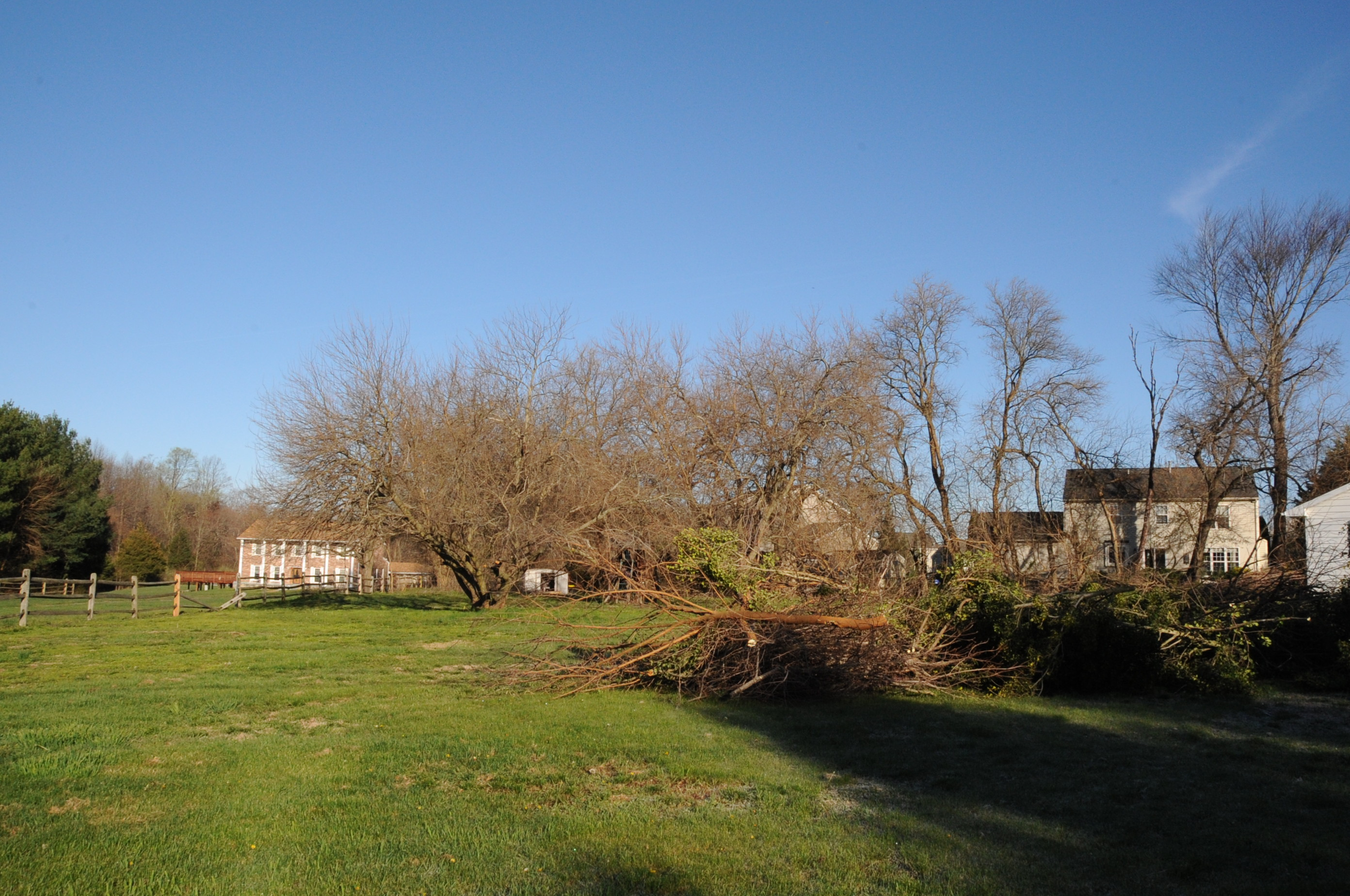
- Area near the historical marker

- Location within Delaware Location within the United States
- Location: 1.4 miles southeast on Delaware Route 299 from intersection with US 13 in Appoquinimink Hundred, near Odessa, Delaware
- Coordinates: 39°26′25″N 75°38′38″W
- Area: 0.1 acres (0.040 ha)
- Built: 1767
- NRHP reference No.: 73000534
- Added to NRHP: December 18, 1973

Duncan Beard Site, also known as the Duncan Beard's House and Shop, is an archaeological site located near Odessa in New Castle County, Delaware, United States. It was the site of the house and shop of a Delaware lock-maker of great distinction and silversmith. He lived and labored here for about 30 years until his death in 1797. He was a prominent member of Old Drawyers Presbyterian Church and made a contract with State of Delaware in 1776 for the manufacture of gun locks.

It was listed on the National Register of Historic Places in 1973.
