= S. Higgins Farm =

Historic house in Delaware, US

- U.S. National Register of Historic Places
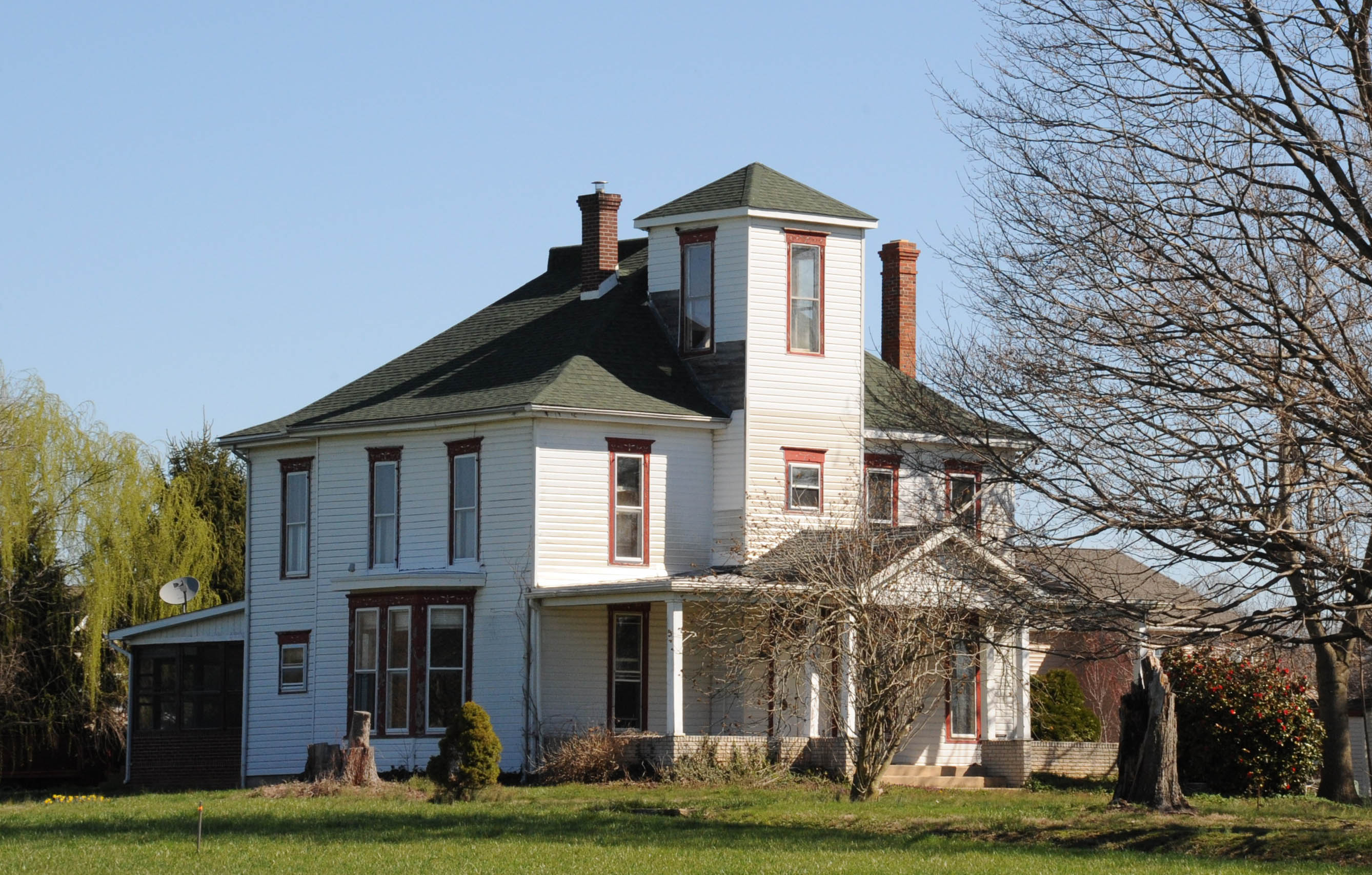

- Location within Delaware Location within the United States
- Location: 913 Ash Farm Way in St Georges Hundred, Odessa, Delaware
- Coordinates: 39.493438°N 75.632275°W
- Area: 1 acre (0.40 ha)
- Built: c. 1865
- Architectural style: Late Victorian, Greek Revival, Federal
- MPS: Rebuilding St. Georges Hundred 1850-1880 TR
- NRHP reference No.: 85002122
- Added to NRHP: September 13, 1985

S. Higgins Farm, also known as Shady View Farm, is a historic home located near Odessa in New Castle County, Delaware, United States. It was built about 1865, and is a two-story frame house built in the vernacular Victorian style. It sits on a stuccoed brick foundation and has a hipped roof. It has an irregular, four-bay facade features a 2 1/2-story tower set off-center to the west with a pyramidal roof.

It was listed on the National Register of Historic Places in 1985.
