= McWhorter House =

Former historic house in Delaware, US

- U.S. National Register of Historic Places
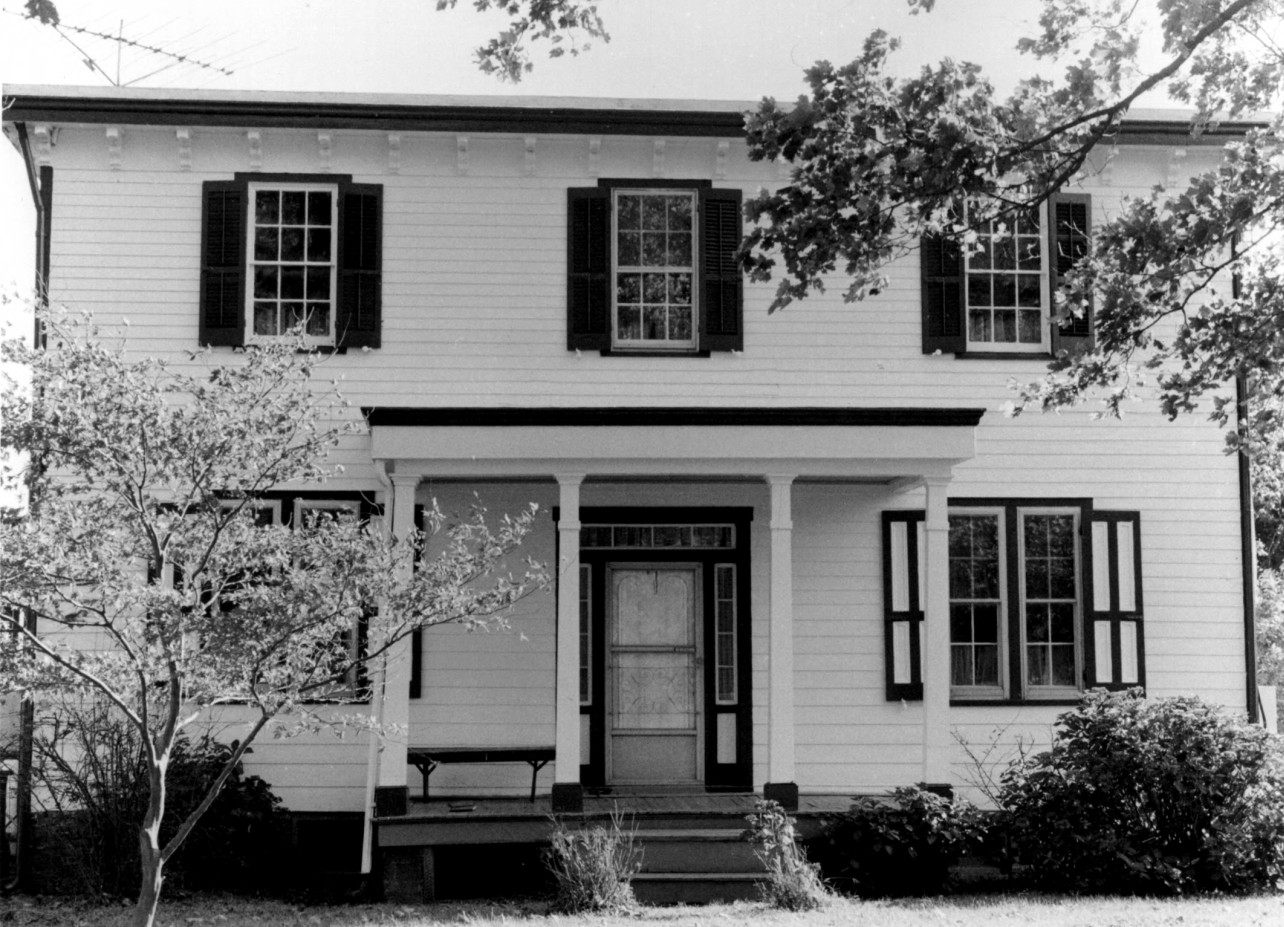
- The house in 1984

- Location within Delaware Location within the United States
- Location: 606 Lorewood Grove Rd. in St. Georges Hundred, Odessa, Delaware
- Coordinates: 39.540463°N 75.661838°W
- Area: 8 acres (3.2 ha)
- Architectural style: Greek Revival, Italianate, Federal
- MPS: Rebuilding St. Georges Hundred 1850-1880 TR
- NRHP reference No.: 85002123
- Added to NRHP: September 13, 1985

McWhorter House was a historic home located near Odessa in New Castle County, Delaware, United States. It was built before 1810, and consisted of a two-story, three-bay, frame main block with Italianate detailing with a two-story, frame kitchen wing to the rear. Also on the property were an early 20th-century frame privy, a late 19th-century board-and-batten storage shed, hewn frame carriage barn with cross-gable over the entry, a 2 1/2-story timber framed crib barn and granary, and an early 19th-century dairy barn.

It was listed on the National Register of Historic Places in 1985. It was demolished in 2004.
