= Okolona (Middletown, Delaware) =

Historic house in Delaware, US

- U.S. National Register of Historic Places
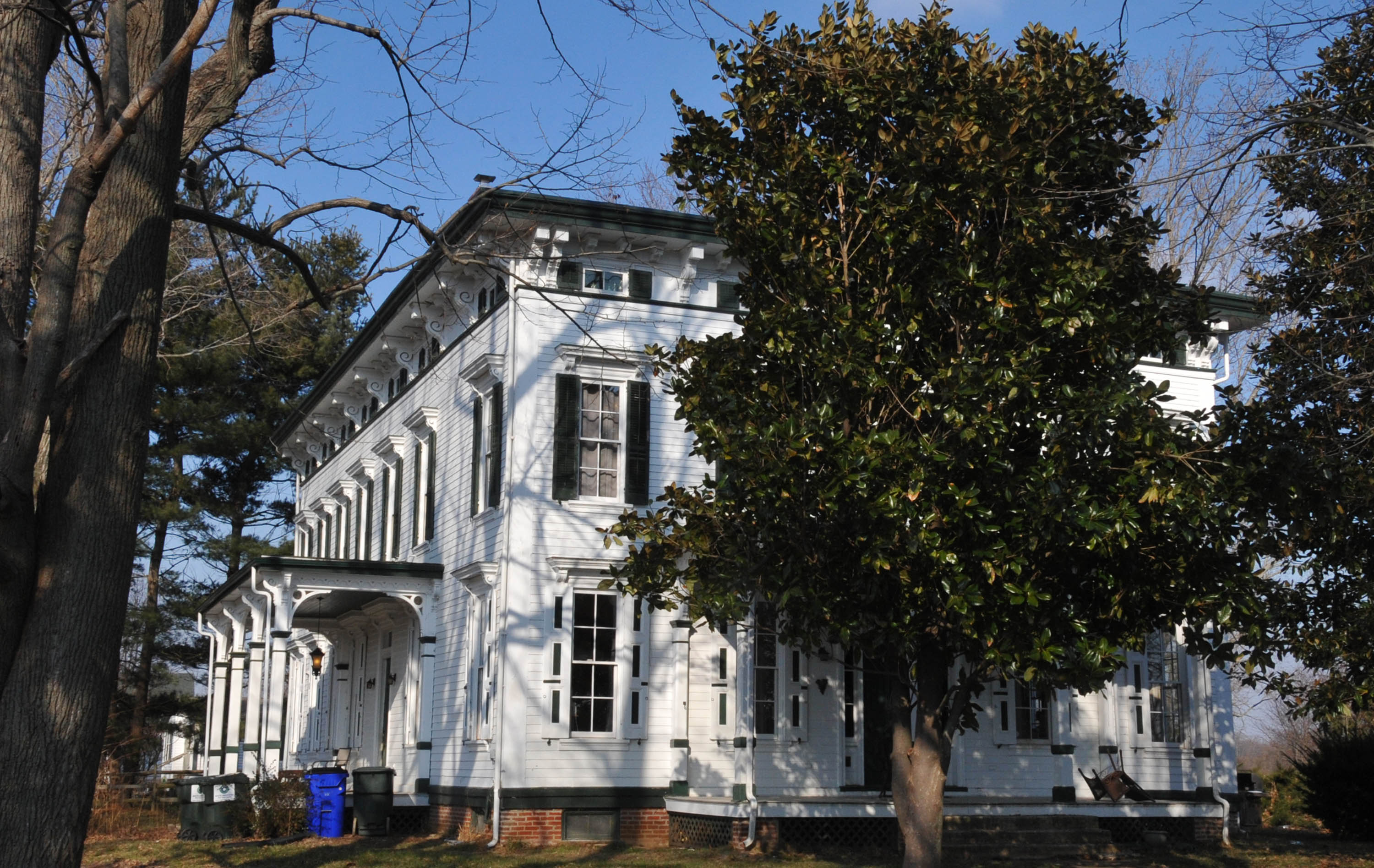

- Location within Delaware Location within the United States
- Location: 1321 Shallcross Lake Road in St. Georges Hundred, near Middletown, Delaware
- Coordinates: 39°28′35″N 75°41′31″W
- Area: 10 acres (4.0 ha)
- Built: 1866
- Architectural style: Italianate
- MPS: Rebuilding St. Georges Hundred 1850-1880 TR
- NRHP reference No.: 85003527
- Added to NRHP: November 19, 1985

Okolona, also known as the R. T. Cochran House, is a historic home located near Middletown in New Castle County, Delaware, United States. It was built in 1866, and is a three-story, Italianate-style dwelling. It sits on a stone foundation and has a low hipped roof. It features an open tetra-style porch or verandah finished with open sawnwork trim and squared columns, and cornice brackets.

It was listed on the National Register of Historic Places in 1985.
