= Cleves (disambiguation) =

Cleves, traditional English name of Kleve, a town in northwestern Germany.

Cleves may also refer to:

- Cleves, Iowa, an unincorporated community, United States
- Cleves, Ohio, a village, United States
- Duchy of Cleves, a state of the Holy Roman Empire
- Get of Cleves, controversial get issued in Cleves

== People ==
- John Cleves Symmes
- John Cleves Symmes Jr.
- Rachel Hope Cleves (born 1975), an American-Canadian historian

== See also ==
- Cleve (disambiguation)
- Kleve (disambiguation)
- Anne of Cleves
- Jülich-Cleves-Berg
