= Cleaver (disambiguation) =

A cleaver is a large knife.

Cleaver or Cleavers may also refer to:

== People and fictional characters ==
- Cleaver (surname), a list of people and fictional characters
- Cleaver Bunton (1902–1999), member of the Australian Senate and mayor

== Places ==
- Cleaver Peak, Grand Teton National Park, Wyoming
- Cleaver Lake (disambiguation), various bodies of water in Canada
- Cleaver House, in Delaware, United States
- Cleaver Square, a garden square in London, United Kingdom

== Other uses ==
- Cleaver (Stone Age tool), a type of stone tool
- Cleaver (geometry), a line segment that bisects the perimeter of a triangle
- Cleaver (propeller), a type of boat propeller design
- Cleaver, a type of arête, that separates a unified flow of glacial ice from its uphill side
- Cleaver (The Sopranos), a metafictional film within a TV series
- Cleavers, a herbaceous plant

== See also ==
- Cleave (disambiguation)
- Cleavage (disambiguation)
