= Cleve =

Cleve may refer to:

== Places ==
- Kleve, a town in Germany known historically in English as Cleves
- Cleve, South Australia, a town
- District Council of Cleve, including the town of Cleve, Australia
- Cleve, a colonial plantation in King George County, Virginia, United States
- "The Cleve", a nickname for Cleveland, Ohio, United States
- United Duchies of Jülich-Cleves-Berg, a State of the Holy Roman Empire

== People ==
- Cleve (given name)
- Cleve (surname)
- Schoolboy Cleve (1925–2008), American harmonica player

== Other uses ==
- Cleve RFC, an English amateur rugby union club

== See also ==
- Anne of Cleves
- Cleves (disambiguation)
- Kleve (disambiguation)
- Cleave (disambiguation)
- Cleeve (disambiguation)
