= Kleve (disambiguation) =

Kleve is a town in North Rhine-Westphalia, Germany.

Kleve may also refer to other places in Germany:

- Kleve (district), a local government district in northwestern North Rhine-Westphalia
- Kleve (electoral district), a Bundestag electoral constituency in North Rhine-Westphalia
- Kleve station, a railway station in the town of Kleve
- Kleve (region), a government region of the Prussian Province of Jülich-Cleves-Berg 1815–1822
- Kleve, Dithmarschen, a municipality in the district of Dithmarschen, Schleswig-Holstein
- Kleve, Steinburg, a municipality in the district of Steinburg, Schleswig-Holstein

== See also ==
- Cleve (disambiguation)
- Cleeve (disambiguation)
- Cleave (disambiguation)
