= Cleft =

A cleft is an opening, fissure, or V-shaped indentation.

Cleft may refer to:

== Anatomy ==
- Cleft lip and palate, a congenital deformity
- Cleft chin, a dimple on the chin
- Pudendal cleft, part of the vulva
- Intergluteal cleft, the groove between the buttocks

== Fiction ==
- The Cleft, a 2007 novel by Nobel prize laureate Doris Lessing
- Cleft, the Boy Chin Wonder, a character in The Fairly Odd Parents

== Linguistics ==
- Cleft sentence, a type of grammatical construction

== Places ==
- Cleft Island (Antarctica)
- Cleft Island (Victoria)
- Cleft Ledge
- Cleft Point
- Cleft Peak
- Cleft Rock

== See also ==
- Cleave (disambiguation), the present tense of the past participle "cleft"
- Clef (disambiguation)
