= Cleavage =

Cleavage may refer to:

== Science ==
- Cleavage (crystal), the way in which a crystal or mineral tends to split
- Cleavage (embryo), the division of cells in an early embryo
- Cleavage (geology), foliation of rock perpendicular to stress, a result of ductile deformation
- Cleave (fiber), a controlled break in an optical fiber
- Bond cleavage, in chemistry and biochemistry, the splitting of chemical bonds
- Cleavage factor, a protein complex that helps cleave of a newly synthesized pre-messenger RNA (mRNA)
- Cleavage furrow, in cell biology, the indentation that begins the process of cleavage, by which animal cells undergo cytokinesis
- Proteolysis, also called peptide cleavage, the breaking down of proteins

== Anatomy ==
- Cleavage (breasts), the partial exposure of breasts or their intervening gap.
- Buttock cleavage, the minor exposure of the buttocks and the gluteal cleft between them
- Toe cleavage, the partial exposure of toes in shoes
- Teeth cleavage or tooth cleavage, slang for diastema, the gap between a person's two front teeth

== Other uses ==
- Cleavage (politics), the divisions of society that cause people to vote differently

== See also ==
- Cleave (disambiguation)
- Cleaver (disambiguation)
