= Donsbrüggen =

Village in Germany

Coordinates: 51.8014°N 6.0956°E

Donsbrüggen is a village in the municipality of Kleve, Kreis Kleve in the German State of North Rhine-Westphalia, with some 1,500 current residents.

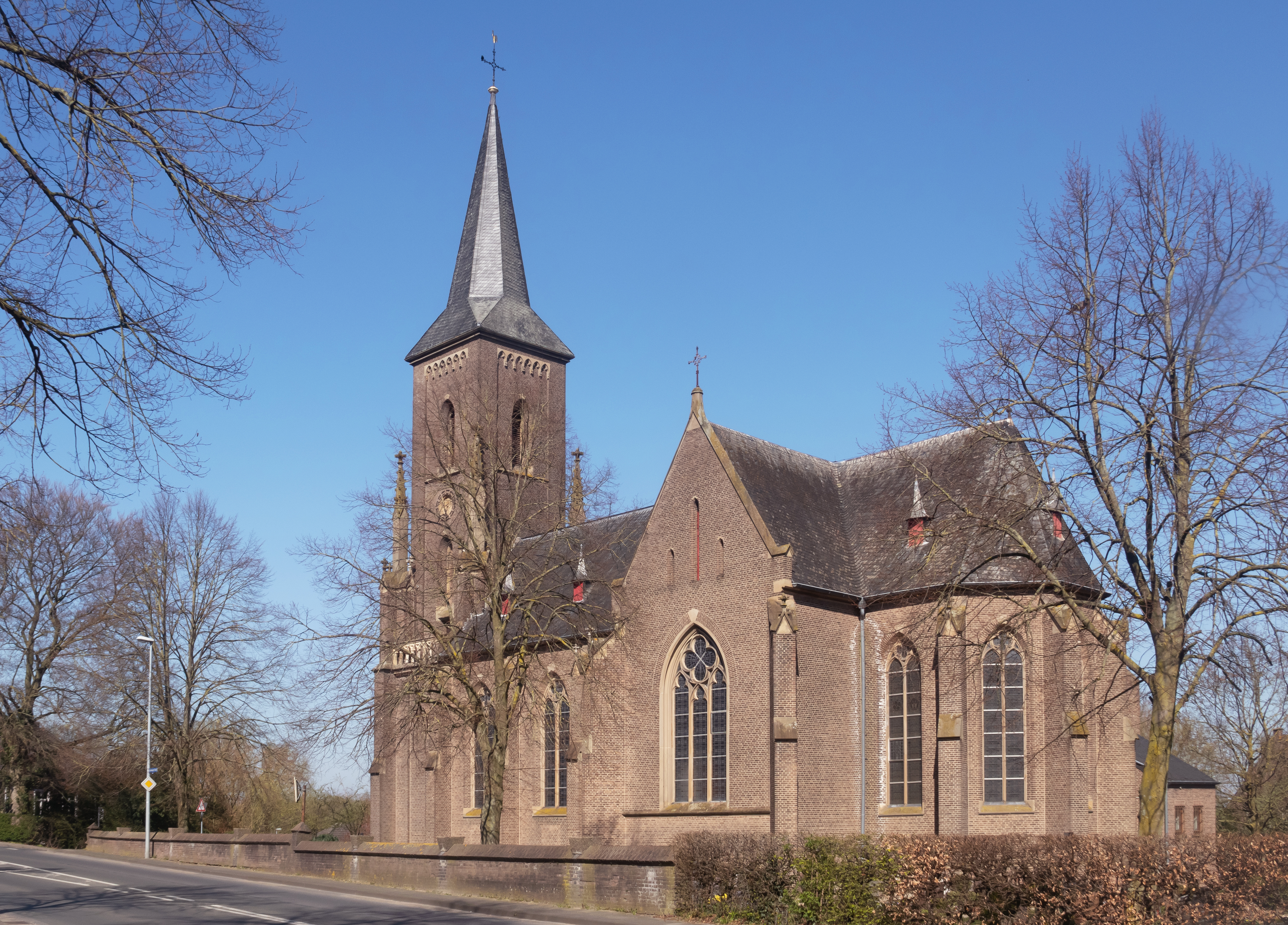
St. Lambertus Church

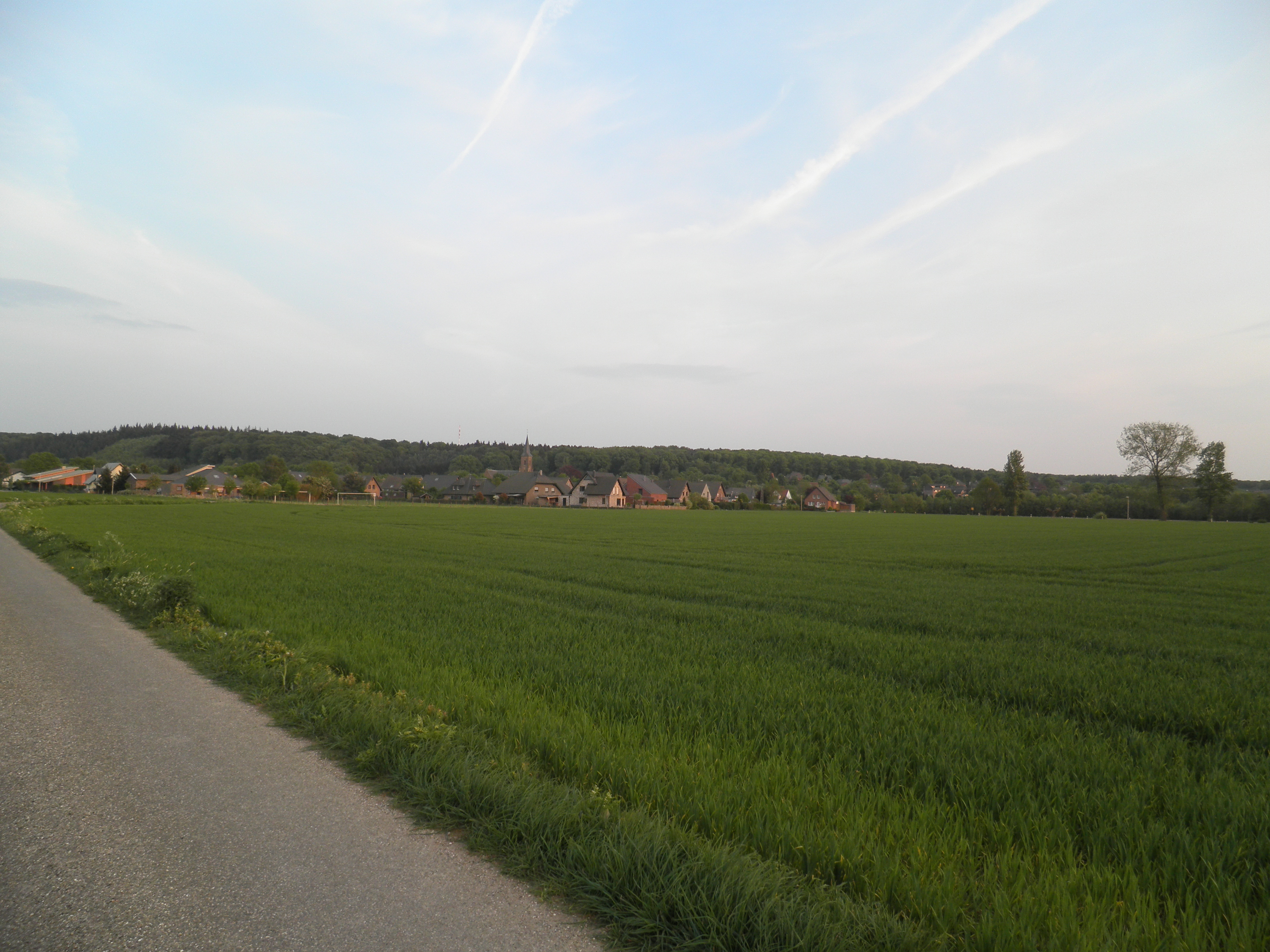
View of Donsbrüggen

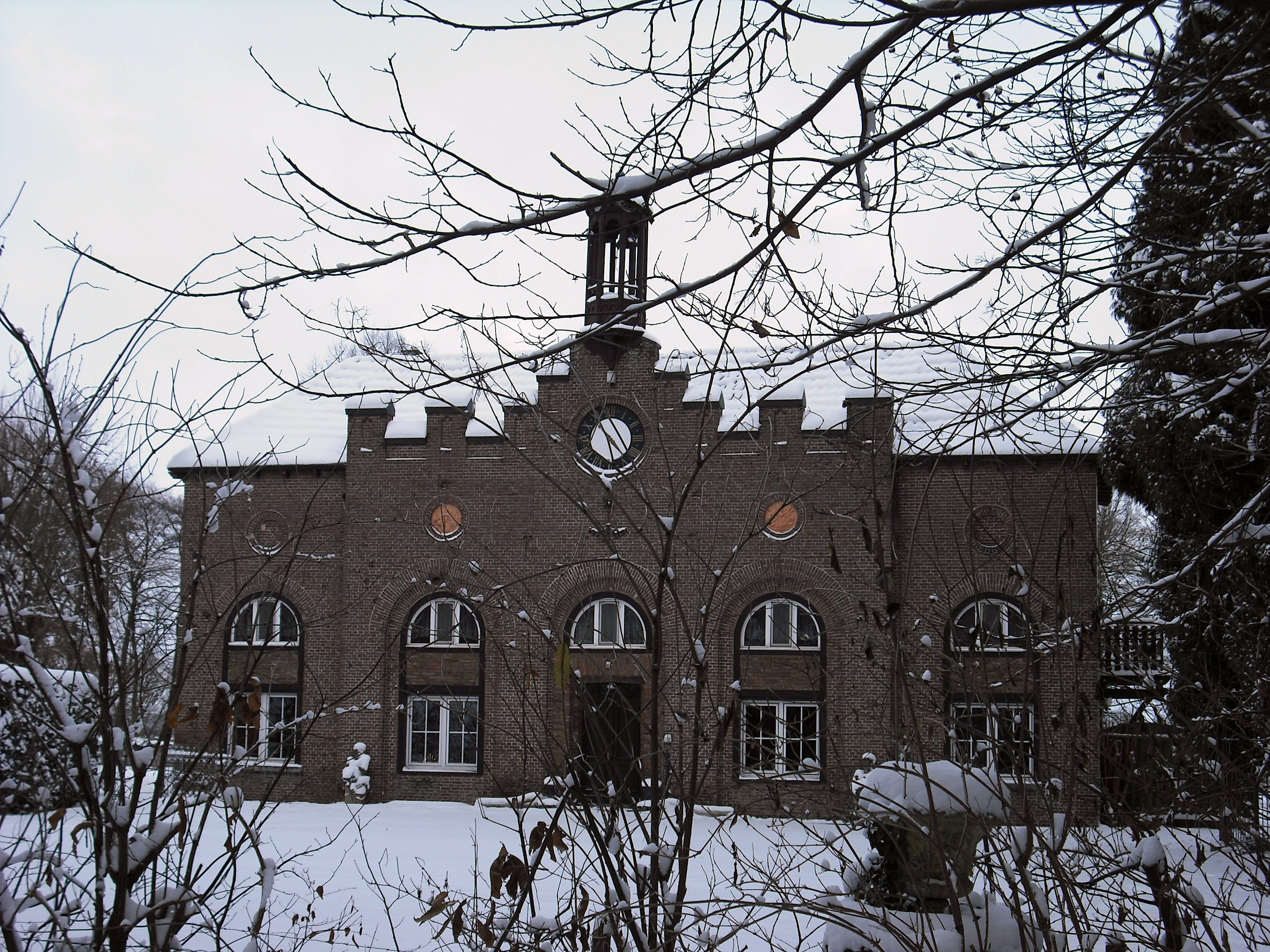
Castle Gnadenthal

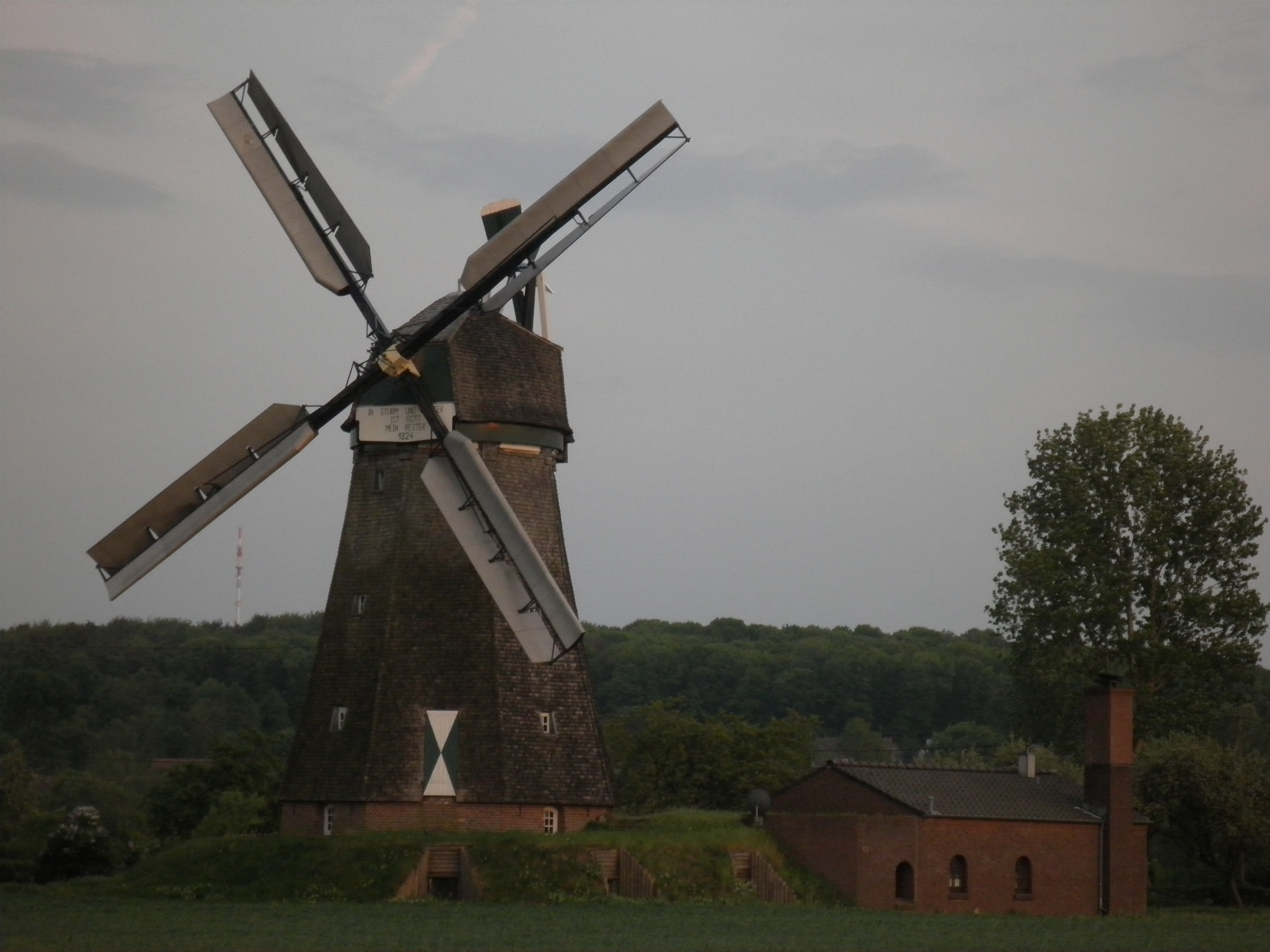
Donsbrüggen Mill
