= Cleaves =

Cleaves is a surname. Notable people with the surname include:

- Cassius Cleaves (born 2003), English rugby player
- Henry B. Cleaves
- Jessica Cleaves (1948–2014), American singer-songwriter
- Margaret Cleaves (1848–1917), American physician
- Mateen Cleaves (born 1977), American basketball player

== See also ==
- Anne of Cleves, fourth wife of King Henry VIII
- Cleave (disambiguation)
