= Kleve transmitter =

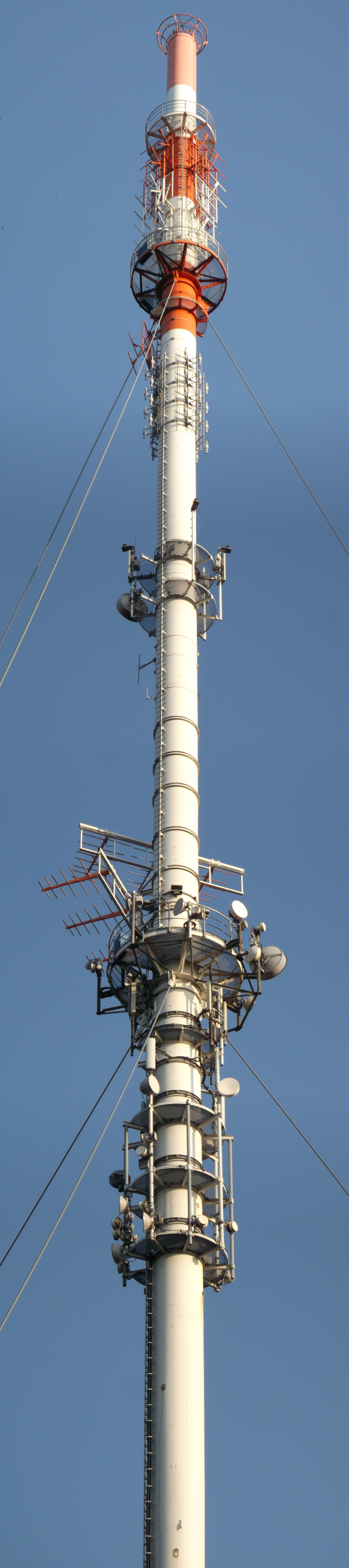
- Location: Kleve, Germany
- Mast height: 126.4 metres (415 ft)
- Coordinates: 51°47′11″N 6°06′40″E
- Built: 1953

Kleve transmitter is a facility for FM and TV transmission (until 1993 also medium wave transmission) of the WDR near Kleve in North Rhine-Westphalia, Germany. The Kleve transmitter was founded in 1953.

Since 1994, the transmitter uses as a transmission tower a 126.4 metres (415 feet) high guyed steel tube mast. The mast is guyed at 57 and 101.6 metres (187 and 333 feet) above ground. This mast replaced the old radio mast from the 1960s which was also used for transmissions in the medium wave range until 1993.

== See also ==
- List of masts
