= Cleeve Hill =

Cleeve Hill may refer to the following places in England:

- Cleeve Hill, Gloucestershire
  - Cleeve Hill, a village under the hill in Woodmancote parish
- Cleeve Hill SSSI, Berkshire
- Cleeve Hill SSSI, Somerset
- Cleve Hill solar farm, a 350MW solar farm near Faversham, Kent

== See also ==
- Cleveland Hills, in North Yorkshire, England
- Cleveland Hill, New York, in the United States
