= Cleave =

Cleave may refer to:

- Cleave (surname)
- Cleave (fiber), a controlled break in optical fiber
- RAF Cleave, was an airfield in the north of Cornwall, England, May 1939 - Nov 1945
- The process of protein cleaving as a form of post-translational modification
- Cleave (Therapy? album), 2018
- "Cleaved" (Star vs. the Forces of Evil), a 2019 episode

== See also ==
- Cleavage (disambiguation)
- Cleaver (disambiguation)
- Cleeve (disambiguation)
- Cleaves (surname)
- Cleve (disambiguation)
- Cleft (disambiguation)
- Van Cleave
