= Cleaver Lake =

Cleaver Lake may refer to:

In Canada

- Cleaver Lake (Manitoba)
- Cleaver Lake (New Brunswick)
- Cleaver Lake (Northwest Territories)
- Ontario
  - Cleaver Lake (Thunder Bay District)
  - Cleaver Lake (Timiskaming District)

== See also ==
- Peter Cleaver Lake (Alaska)
- North Cleaver Lake (Ontario)
