= Bimmen =

Village of the town of Kleve, North Rhine-Westphalia, Germany

Coordinates: 51°51′31″N 6°4′5″E

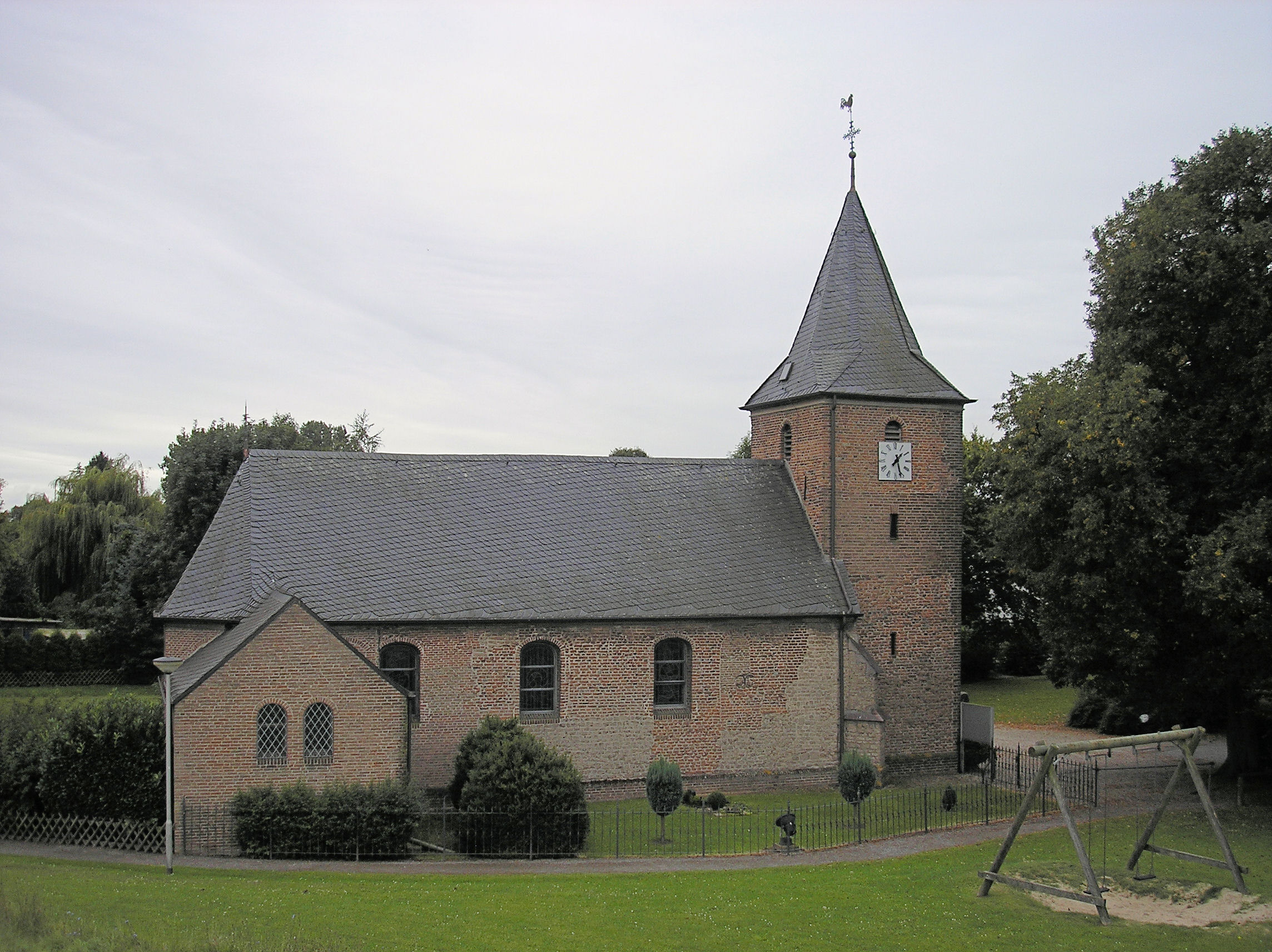
Catholic Church of Saint Martin

Bimmen is a village of the town of Kleve, in the district of Kleve in the west of the federal state of North Rhine-Westphalia, Germany.

The tiny village has an area of 2.09 km^{2} and a population of about 170.

Bimmen is situated on the left or south bank of the Rhine and borders the Dutch village of Millingen aan de Rijn in the province of Gelderland.
