= Schwanenburg Castle =

Castle in Kleve, Germany

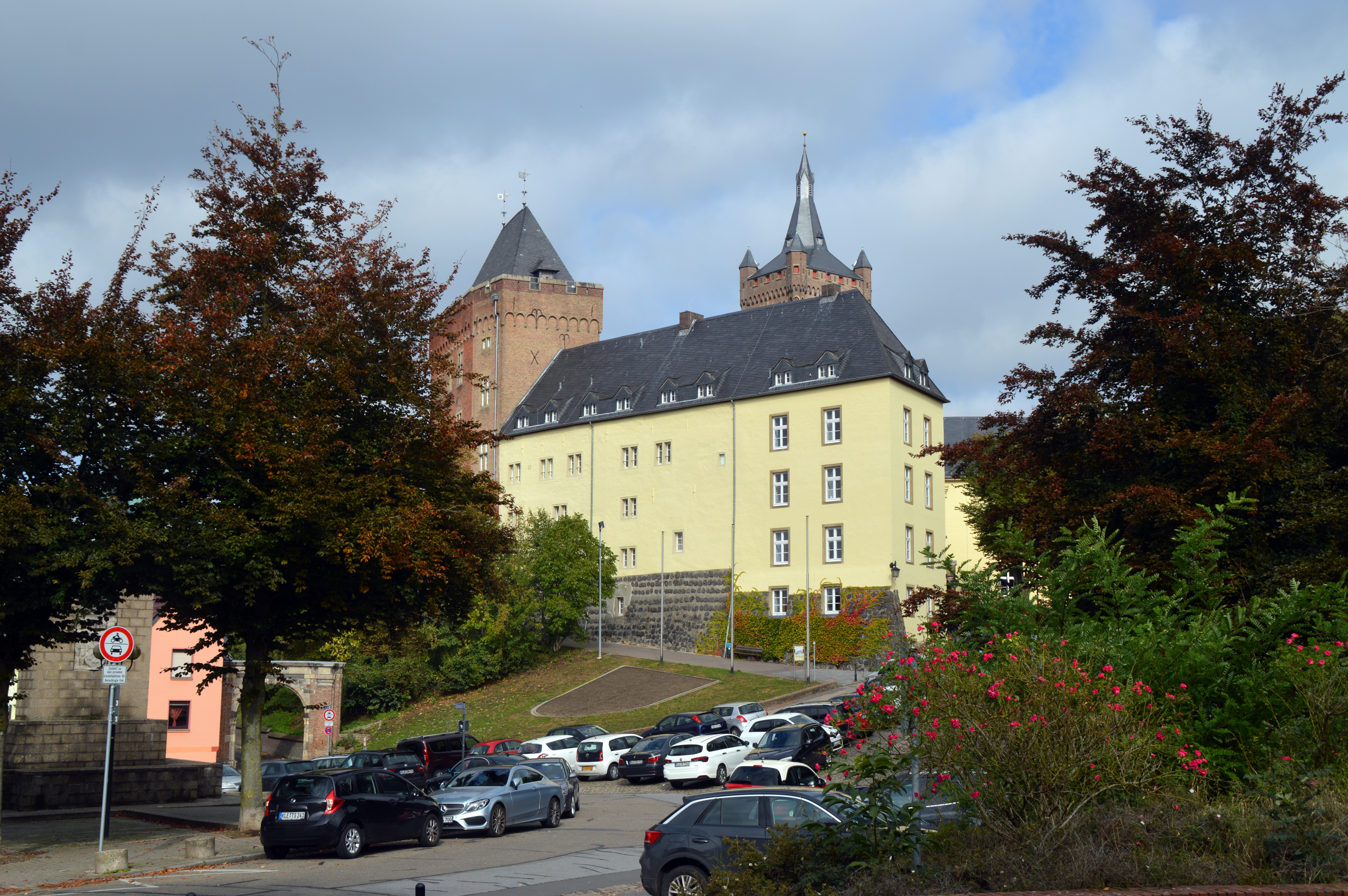
- Schwanenburg Castle, seen from the south
- Interactive map of the Schwanenburg Castle area
- Alternative names: Swan Castle

General information
- Architectural style: Baroque
- Location: Kleve, North Rhine-Westphalia state, Germany
- Completed: Before 1092
- Renovated: 1663-1666, 1948-1953

Height
- Height: 180 ft (55 m)

Design and construction
- Architect: Pieter Post
- Known for: Anna of Cleves, Lohengrin (opera), Klevian gardens

Other information
- Parking: Yes

Website
- https://www.kleve.de/de/sehenswuerdigkeiten/schwanenburg/

The Schwanenburg Castle (English: Swan Castle), in North Rhine-Westphalia, where the Dukes of Cleves resided, was founded on a steep hill. It is located at the northern terminus of the Kermisdahl where it joins with the Spoykanal, which was previously an important transportation link to the Rhine.

== History ==
It is already conceivable that in Roman times there was a military base at this point, high above the Rhine, halfway between Xanten and Nijmegen.

The Swan Castle was first mentioned in 1020 in the monastery annals. The Swan Tower collapsed on 7 October 1439. "300 years before God's birth Caesar has built this". This can be read on an inscription above the entrance of the Swan Tower, which was installed by Adolph I, Duke of Cleves after the tower was rebuilt.

The knight's hall, built around 1170, stood where today the car park surrounded by lime trees is located in the outer courtyard. Remains of the richly decorated hall have been excavated in the courtyard of the castle and can be seen today.

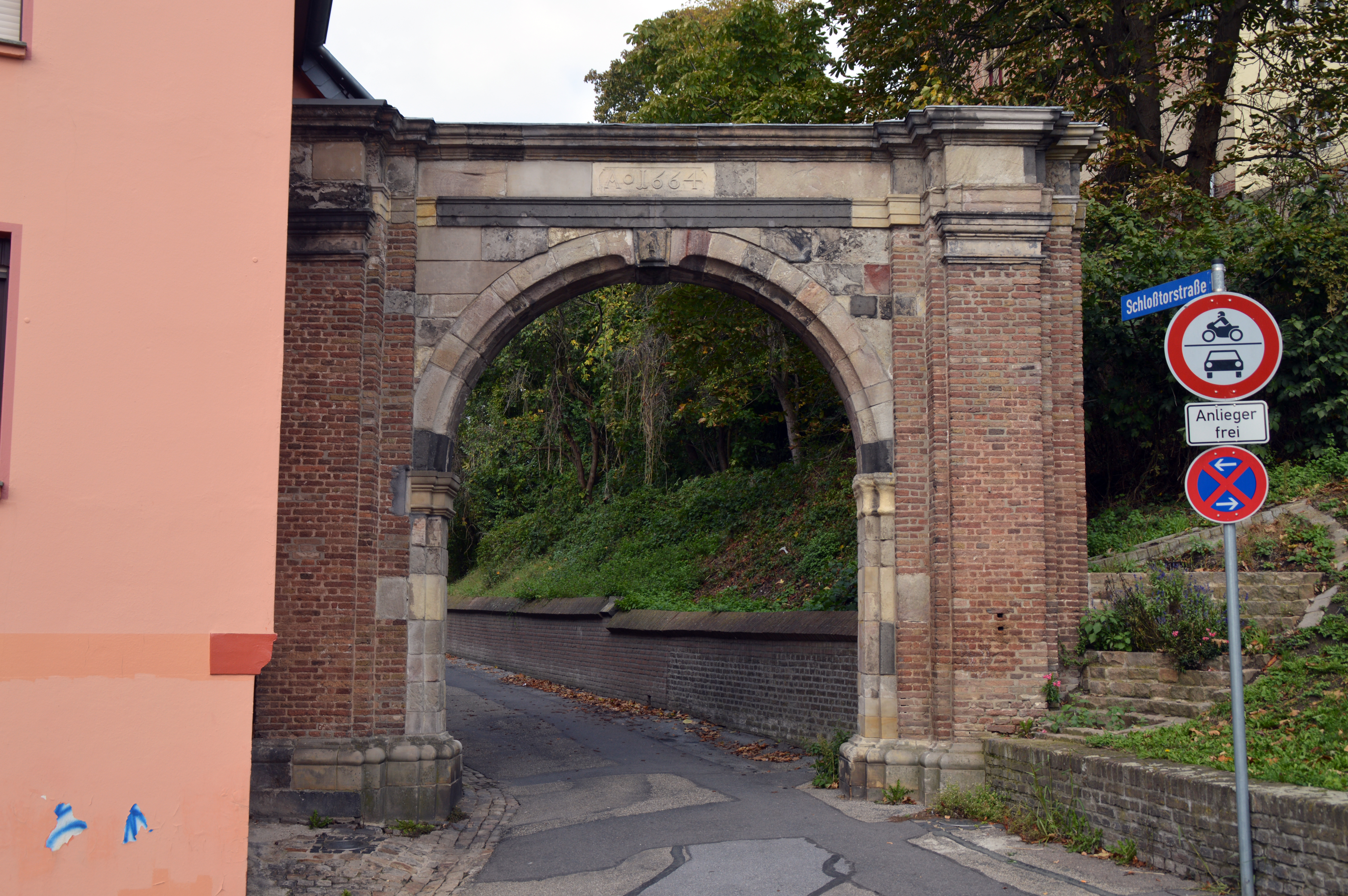
Gate 1664

In 1663, the Stadtholder of the Great Elector; John Maurice, Prince of Nassau-Siegen approved a renovation of the Schwanenburg in the Dutch Baroque style by architect Pieter Post and commissioned the construction of extensive gardens that greatly influenced European landscape design of the 17th century. Significant amounts of his original plan for Kleve were put into effect and have been maintained to the present, a particularly well-loved example of which is the Forstgarten.

In the middle of the 18th century, the building was reduced by collapse and demolition to its present size. Since then, the judicial authorities are located at the castle, and today the castle is the seat of the district and district court of Kleve. In the Swan Tower, a small geological museum is located.

On 7 October 1944, Kleve was subjected to a huge bombardment. These attacks resulted in huge damage to the town. The bombardment destroyed the historic centre of Kleve, including the Swan tower. The castle was rebuilt between 1948 and 1953.

== Swan tower ==
The old castle has a massive tower, the Schwanenturm (Swan tower) 180 feet (55 m) high, that is associated in legend with the Knight of the Swan, immortalized in Richard Wagner's Lohengrin.

Lohengrin first appears as "Loherangrin", the son of Parzival and Condwiramurs in Wolfram von Eschenbach's Parzival. Wolfram's story is a variation of the Knight of the Swan tale, previously attached to the Crusade cycle of medieval literature. Loherangrin and his twin brother Kardeiz join their parents in Munsalväsche when Parzival becomes the Grail King; Kardeiz later inherits their father's secular lands, and Loherangrin remains in Munsalväsche as a Grail Knight.

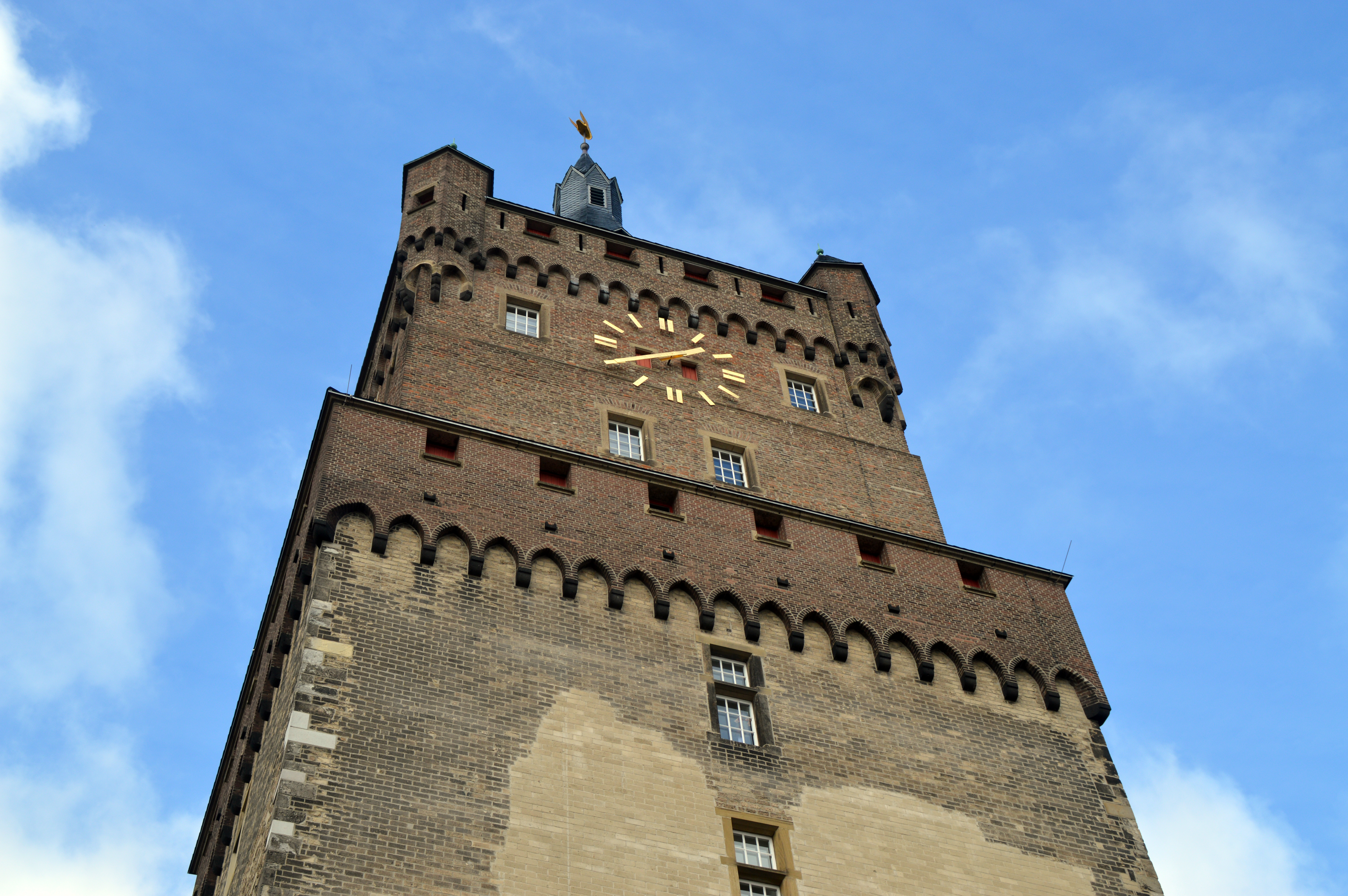
Swan tower

Members of this order are sent out in secret to provide lords to kingdoms that have lost their protectors and Loherangrin is eventually called to this duty in Brabant, where the duke has died without a male heir. His daughter Elsa fears the kingdom will be lost, but Loherangrin arrives in a boat pulled by a swan and offers to defend her, though he warns her that she must never ask his name. He weds the duchess and serves Brabant for years, but one day Elsa asks the forbidden question. He explains his origins and steps back onto his swan boat, never to return.

From Dutch legends of the Swan knight we read that Dietrich, Count of Cleves, Lohn in Westphalia and Teisterbant died in 713 and his daughter Beatrix had to succeed him. Pepin of Herstal, duke of Brabant, who could have helped her, also died (714). In 715 Beatrix was attacked from all sides. She fled to her castle in Nijmegen (Valkhofburcht). Then Elias Lohengrin appears, with a golden sword, silver shield with a double, golden cross, a hunting horn and a beautiful ring with a diamond. He defeats the besiegers, marries Beatrix, and becomes king of Francia. They have three sons: Diederik, Godfrey, and Konrad.

Afterwards Beatrix lives in a tower on the river close to Kleve. She died young and was later remembered as the ‘White Woman of the Swan Tower’. Diederik inherited the golden sword and silver shield and succeeded his father in the county of Cleves. Godfrey became count of Lohn and inherited the hunting horn. And the youngest, Konrad, became ancestor of the counts of Hessen and inherited the ring with the diamond. Lohengrin was told that he had fought the Moors with Charles Martel.

== The legend in historical context ==
There is almost no reliable information about the local power relations in the area of "Kleve" in the early Middle Ages. The few statements by some historians are also controversial. According to one of these sources to 711, a daughter of a noble family named Beatrix married a Count Aelius (or Helios) Gralius, who was a follower of Charles Martell. This count had possessed areas in the area of Teisterbant as a fief. The son of this marriage had been known as Theodoric I from 742 both Count of Teisterbant and the first Earl of Cleves. Among his descendants, the counties Teisterbant and Cleves were divided. The last descendant of this noble family in Cleves was Count Nufried, after his death in 1008 this family line has died out.

A "Beatrix" from a noble house is also mentioned in a legend or fairy tale as the ancestor of the Counts of Cleves, who married a swan knight Elias. At least since the 15th century, the Counts and Dukes of Cleves derived their origin from this swan knight Elias (Aelius = Elias), who is related to the figure of Lohengrin.

=== About Beatrix of Cleves, Countess of Teisterband ===
Walter, Count of Teisterbant, in the Dukedom of Gelre, District of the Betuwe, died either 724 or 742 (Oudheusden). His daughter and heiress Beatrix, Countess of Teisterbant, married around 711 Theodoric, Stadtholder and Lord of Cleves. Their daughter and heiress Beatrix, Countess of Teisterbant, got married after the death of both her parents to Elias, Aelius, or Elius Grail, Gralius, Graielis, or Grajus, a great hero, Stadtholder of Nijmegen and (purely legendary) first Count of Cleves. She died 734.

== Gallery ==
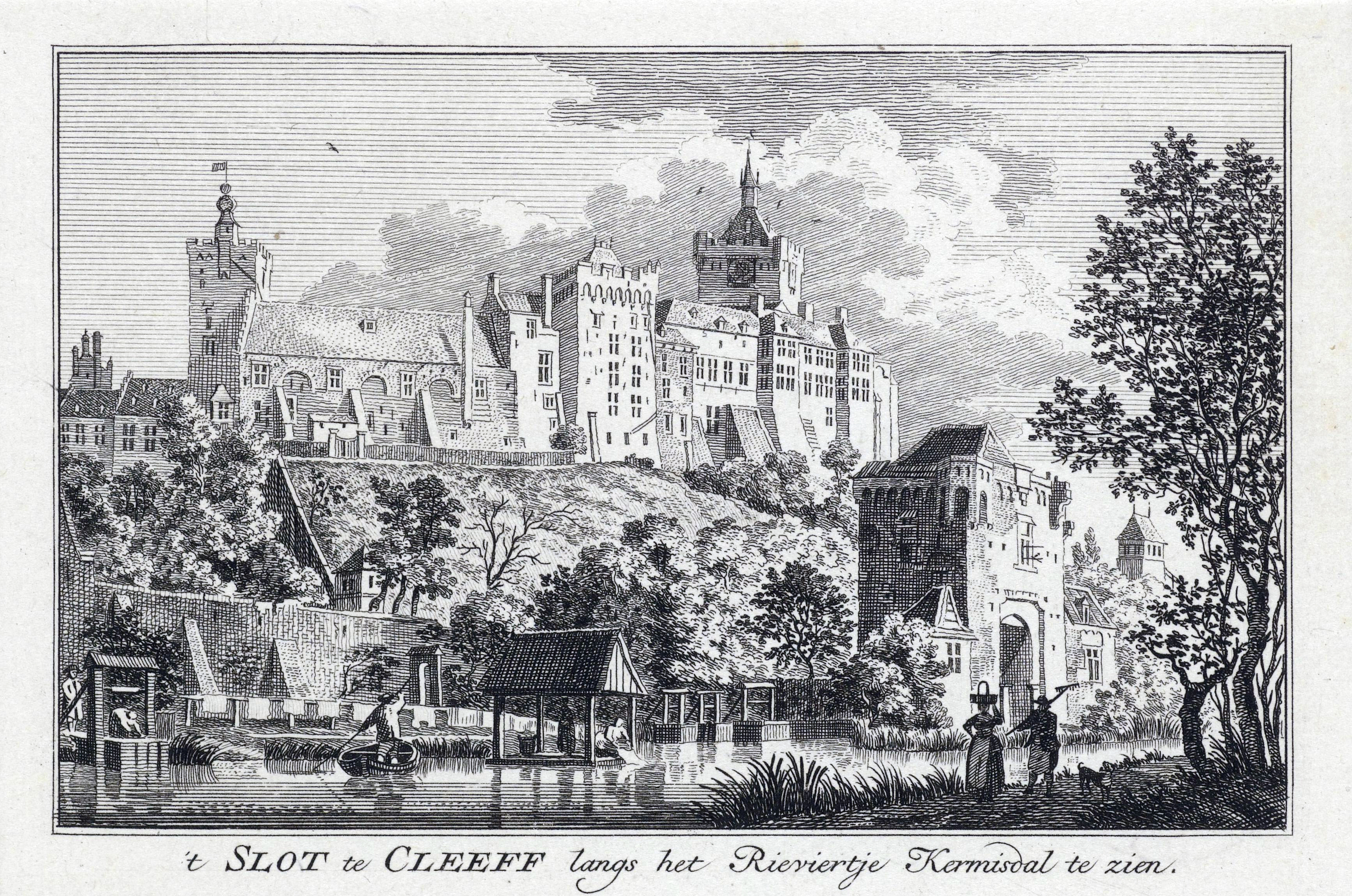
Schwanenburg castle seen from the south. 1758

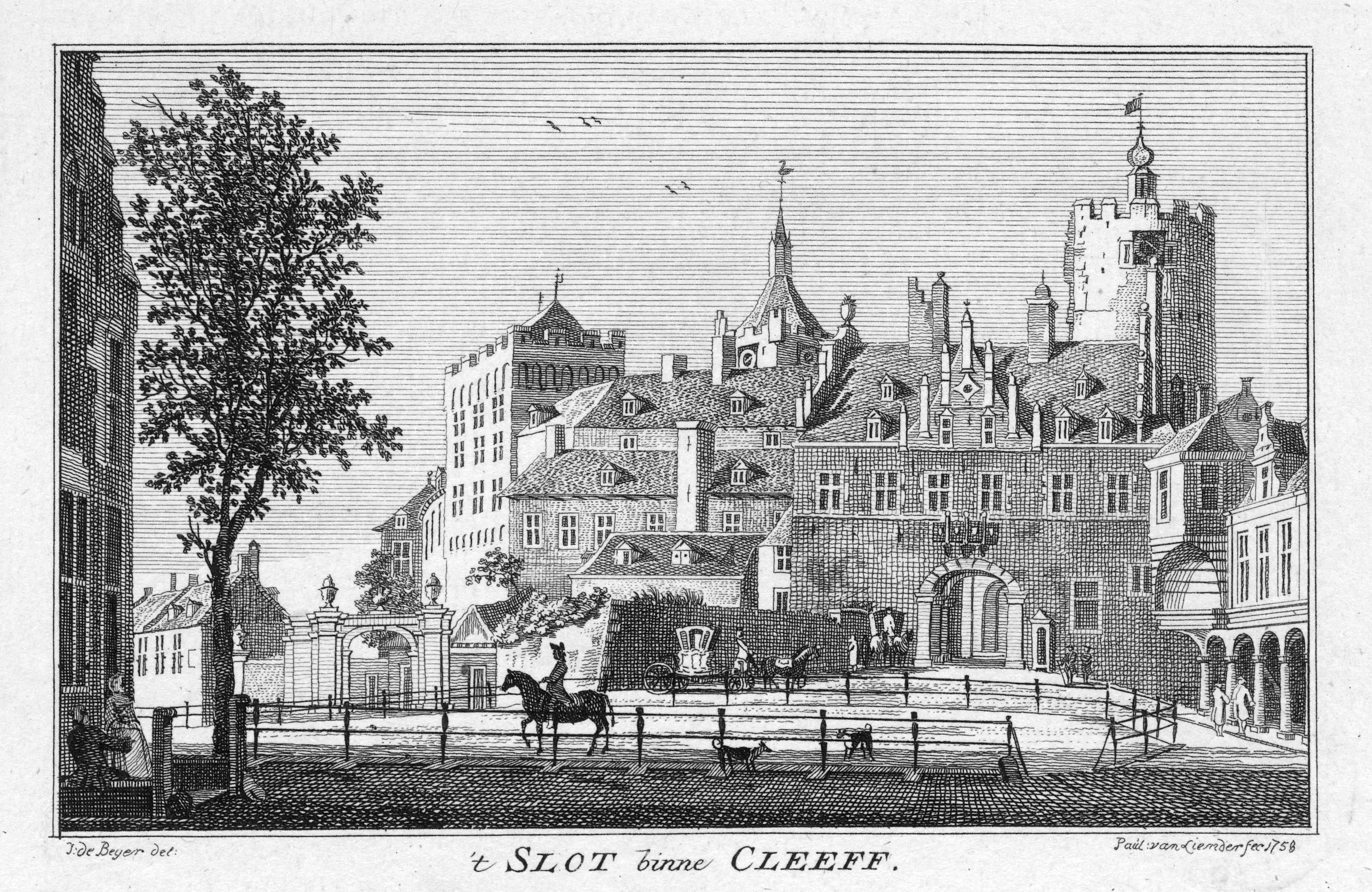
Schwanenburg castle. entrance. 1758

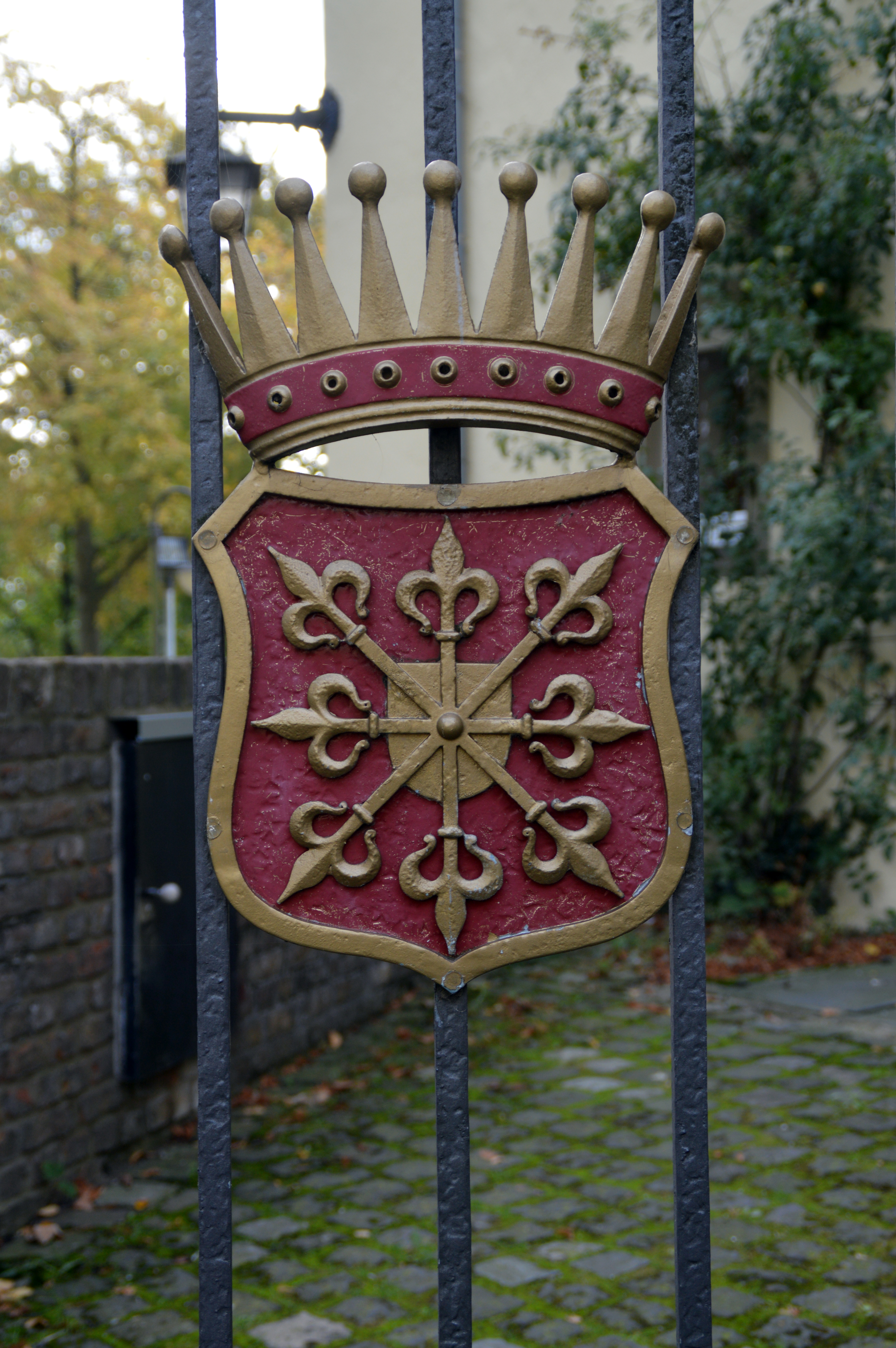
Coat of arms Counts of Cleves

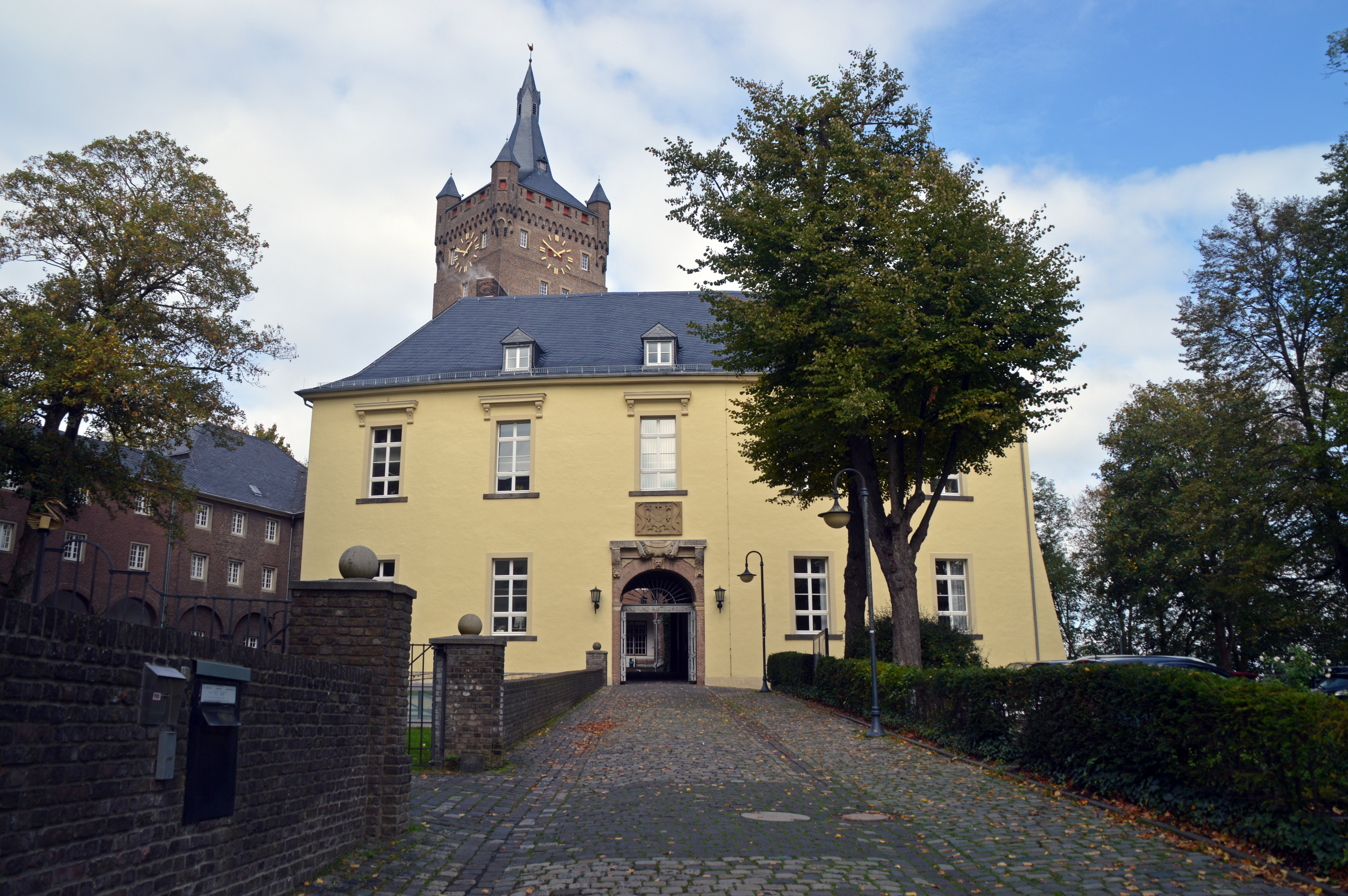
Outer court

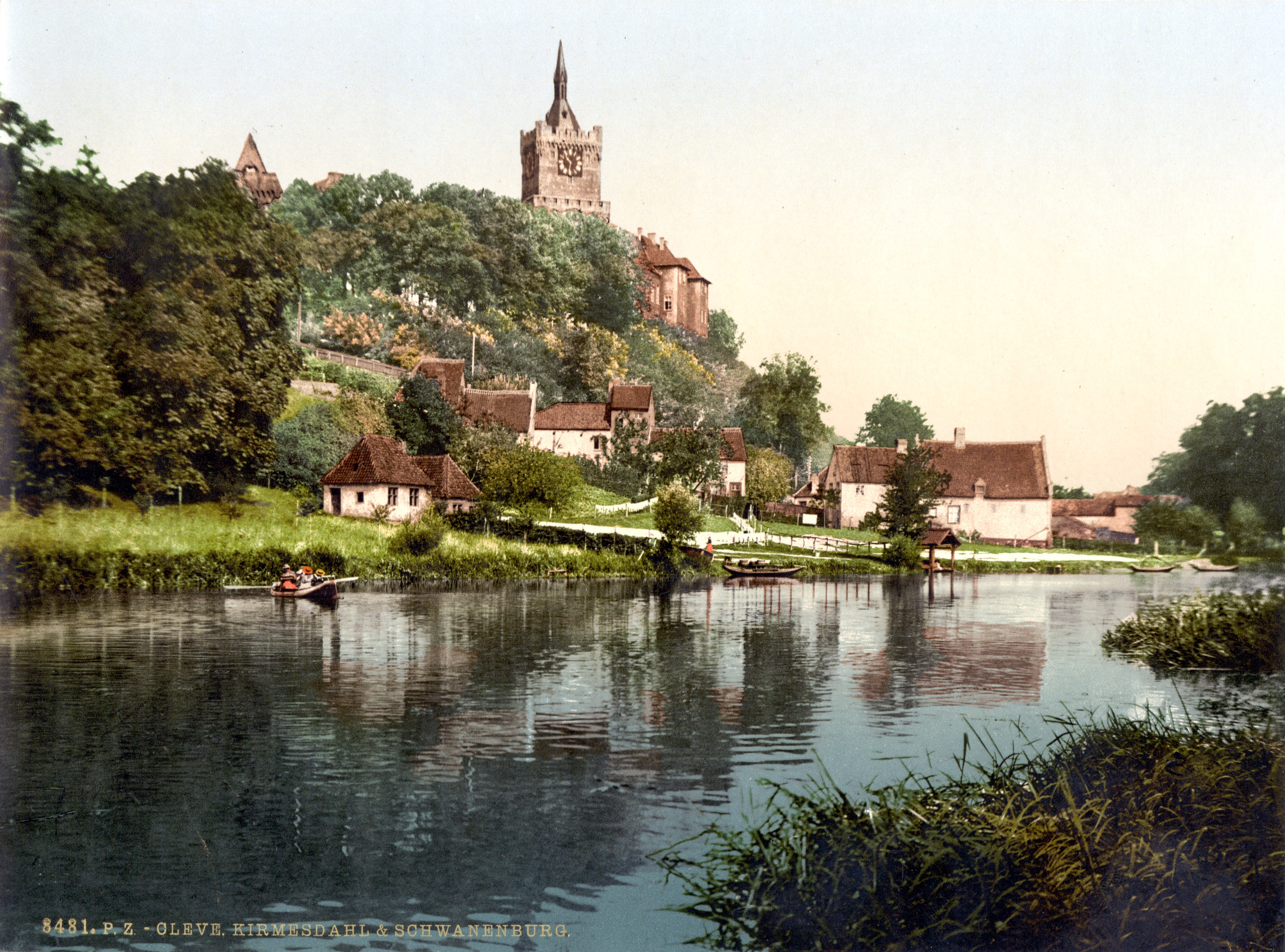
Schwanenburg 1897

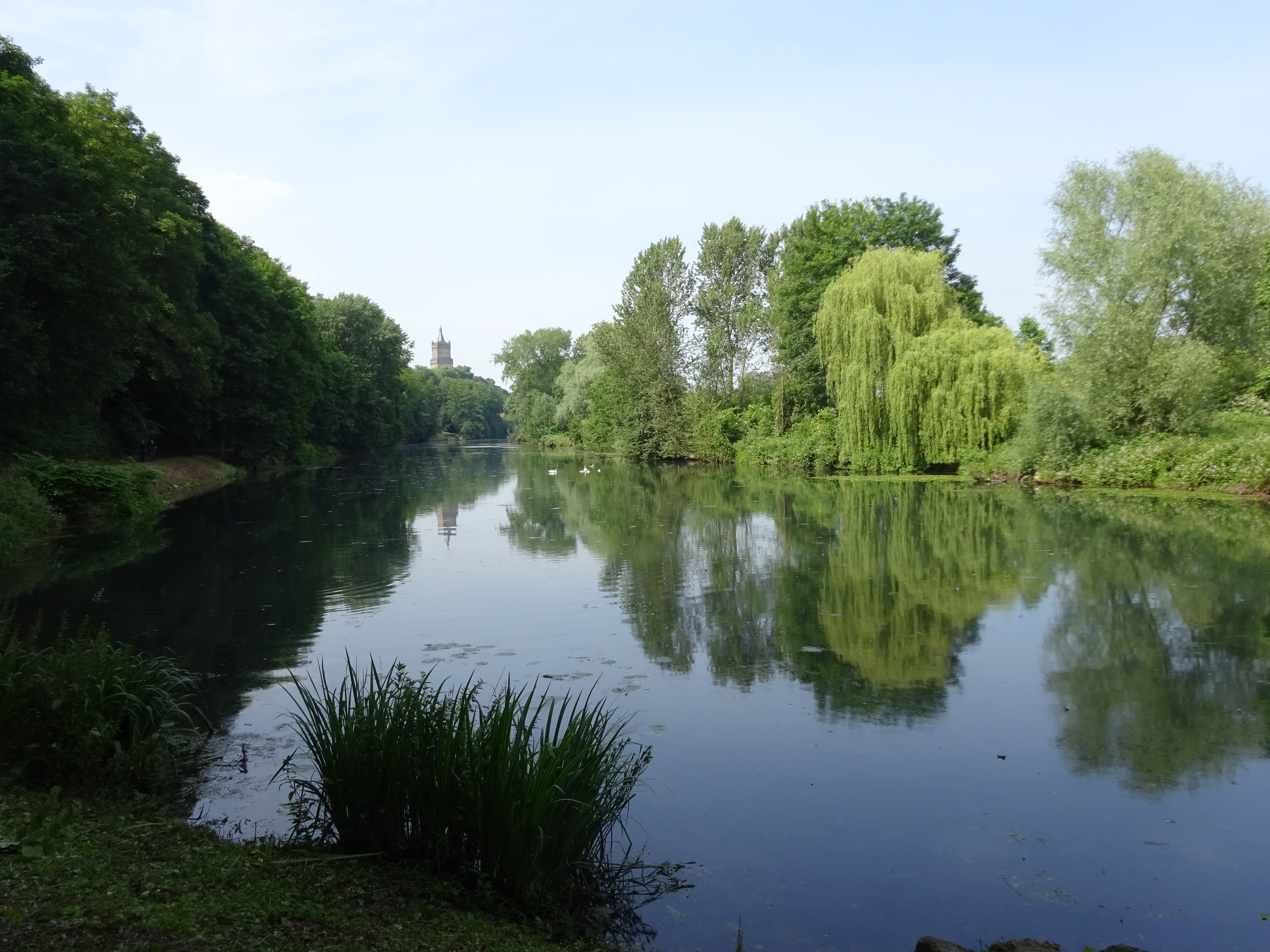
Kermisdahl and Schwanenburg castle

== See also ==
- Duchy of Cleves
- Anne of Cleves
