= Cleeve =

Cleeve may refer to the following places in England:

- Cleeve, Somerset, a village in North Somerset
- Old Cleeve, a small village between Williton and Dunster in Somerset
- Chapel Cleeve, another small village between Williton and Dunster in Somerset
- Cleeve Abbey, a ruined Cistercian abbey, just south of Washford in Somerset, now owned by English Heritage
- Bishop's Cleeve, a village in Gloucestershire
- Cleeve railway station, a former station near Bishop's Cleeve
- Cleeve, Oxfordshire, part of Goring-on-Thames

== See also ==
- Cleave (disambiguation)
- Cleeve Hill (disambiguation)
- Cleve (disambiguation)
