= Clef (disambiguation) =

A clef is a musical symbol used to indicate the pitch of written notes.

Clef may also refer to:

- Clef Records, an American record label
- Clefs, Maine-et-Loire, a village in France,
- The Clefs, an Australian band
- Cross Language Evaluation Forum (CLEF), organization promoting research in multilingual information access
- Treble-clef, a type of zinc finger in molecular biology
- Clef, a character in the video game Unbeatable

== See also ==
- Key (disambiguation)
- Cleft (disambiguation)
