= Cleaver House =

Historic house and farm in Delaware, US

- U.S. National Register of Historic Places
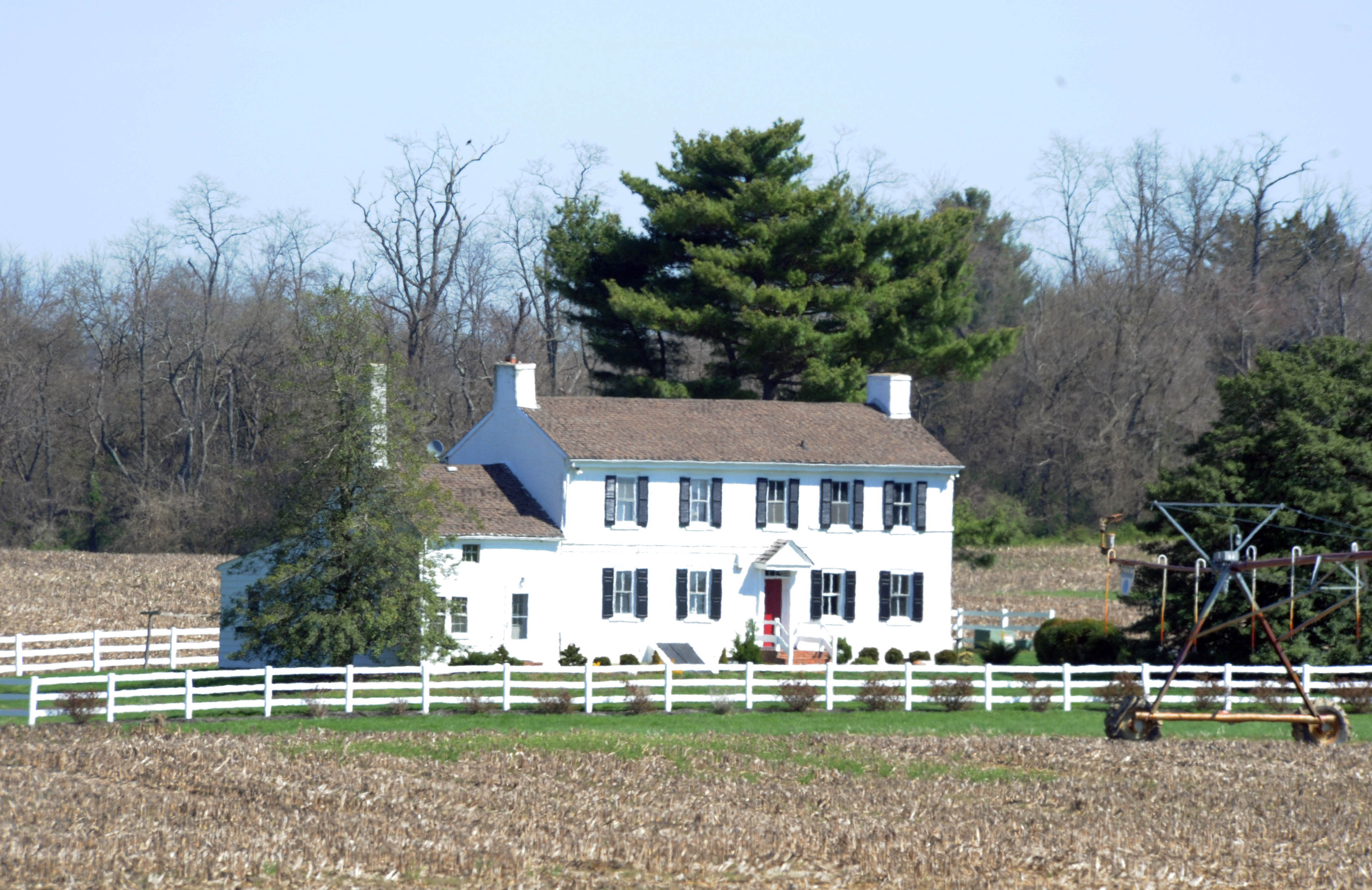

- Location within Delaware Location within the United States
- Location: 713 Port Penn Road, Port Penn, Delaware
- Coordinates: 39.522917°N 75.614487°W
- Area: 1.5 acres (0.61 ha)
- Built: 1816
- Architectural style: Greek Revival, Late Victorian, Federal
- MPS: Rebuilding St. Georges Hundred 1850-1880 TR
- NRHP reference No.: 85002116
- Added to NRHP: September 13, 1985

Cleaver House is a historic house and farm located to the west of Port Penn in New Castle County, Delaware, United States, about one mile east of US 13 and Biddles Corner. The house was built about 1816, and is a two-story, seven-bay, gable-roofed farm dwelling built in three different sections. The three bay, center brick section is the oldest. Attached to the east is a two bay brick section, making it a five bay center hall dwelling, and to the west a 1 1/2-story frame kitchen wing. The house measures 61 feet long by 17 feet wide.

Also on the property are a contributing frame barn with attached carriage shed and milk house.

It was listed on the National Register of Historic Places in 1985.

Joseph Cleaver, a relative of the residents and possible owner of the farm, was a grain merchant in Port Penn. His residence there, also known as the Cleaver House, is a contributing property in the Port Penn Historic District.
