= Schoolboy Cleve =

American blues harmonica player

Schoolboy Cleve (June 10, 1925 – February 5, 2008), born Cleveland White, was an American blues harmonica player, who worked with Lightnin' Slim, Sonny Boy Williamson, Muddy Waters, and Buddy Guy. He recorded with Lightnin' Slim in the mid-1950s, and under his own stage name for Feature and then Ace Records in 1957. In 1960, he moved to Los Angeles, California, and retired from performing for some years. He resumed again in the 1970s.

Cleve was born in East Baton Rouge Parish in Louisiana, United States, and died in Daly City, California, at the age of 82.
