= Cleave (surname) =

Cleave is a surname. Notable people with the surname include:

- Chris Cleave (born 1973), British journalist
- Egbert Cleave (fl. 1870s), American author
- John Cleave (1790–1847), British chartist
- Mary L. Cleave (born 1947), American astronaut and engineer
- Maureen Cleave (1934–2021), British journalist
- Paul Cleave (born 1974), New Zealand author
- Thomas L. Cleave (1906–1983), British surgeon captain
