= Get of Cleves =

Contentious 18th-century Jewish divorce case

The Get of Cleves was a controversial get issued in Cleves in northwest Germany on 28 August 1766 (22 Elul 5526) purporting to dissolve a Jewish marriage solemnised 14 days earlier. The validity of the get in Halakha was disputed, with the central issue being whether the husband was of sound mind at the time of the divorce. Rabbis from Germany, the Netherlands, and Poland exchanged opinions on the question. The practical matter ended in 1767 when the spouses had a remarriage ceremony, although the validity of this was itself questioned. Two books, published in 1769 (Ohr HaYashar) and 1770 (Ohr Yisroel) gave extensive details of the case.

== Case summary ==
A newly married man's odd behavior led to a secretive on-the-run divorce. The document was written in a bordertown between Dutch and German territories named Cleves, and an asset split favoring the wife, when it was revealed to the husband's family, led to a challenge. Since the husband was alleged to not be mentally competent, this would mean that they were still married, unless the marriage was annulled. Various reputable rabbis in different countries disagreed on important legal details. The husband had left Poland and gone to London, while a major court in Germany, upon the request of a rabbi in Poland, had issued a controversial ruling nullifying the divorce.

Further complications were that the Polish rabbi had written two identical letters, and the ruling in the second court was that the divorce was valid. Since the Polish rabbi died unexpectedly before either ruling came through, rabbis in many countries took sides.

=== Conclusion ===
Some time after talking with one rabbi in London, and subsequently with another, the husband returned to Poland, then traveled with his "wife" to Frankfurt, Germany, whose court accounted for the minority opinion that the divorce was invalid. As described in a book written a century later, the husband used a new ring and declared "At od mekudeshes li betaba’as zo kedas Moshe ve-Yisrael (You remain betrothed to me with this ring in accordance with the laws of Moses and Israel).

== Aftereffects ==
Insanity pleas in the 20th and 21st centuries regarding marriage and divorce now have a better foundation, and it is still being discussed both in religious courts and academia.
