= Toe cleavage =

Partial exposure of toes in footwear

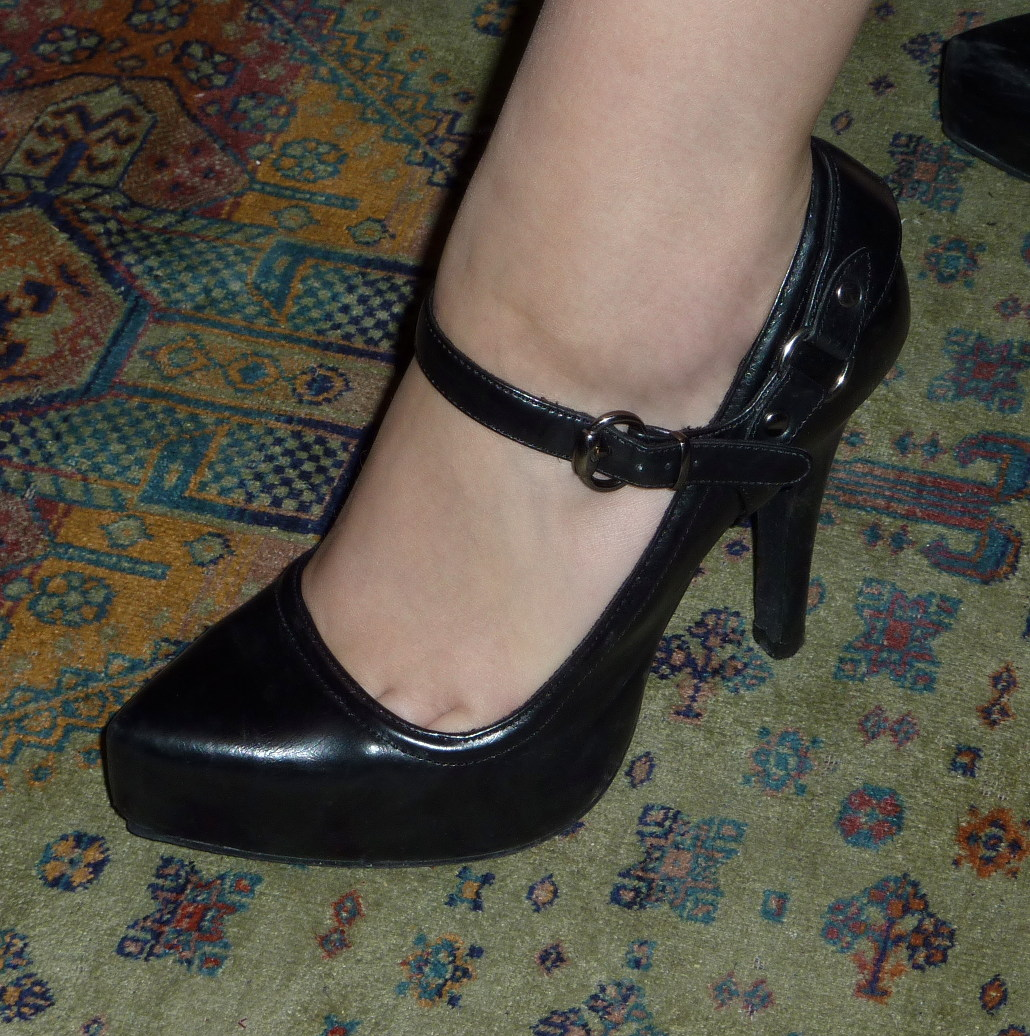
Pumps reveal toe cleavage.

Toe cleavage is the partial exposure of toes in shoes that are cut low enough at the vamp. Low cut shoes reveal toe cleavage similar to how low cut tops reveal breast cleavage.

Toe cleavage was considered to be fashionable in 2005 by stylists such as Susan Conterno, columnist for FAMOUS magazine. Manolo Blahnik himself opined that "the secret of toe cleavage, a very important part of the sexuality of the shoe" is that "You must only show the first two cracks.". In an "InStyle" magazine article, Samuel Ogden writes about the low cut angle in the bend of the shoe cover, stating that the curve creates a balance between the skin of the lower foot and the beginning of the toes.

Shoe designer Christian Louboutin takes a more provocative view of toe cleavage and states, "The point is, it's more provocative to show a low toe cleavage than it is wearing sandals that reveal all. In flip-flops you see everything but that is not at all sexy." He takes this further by relating, "The curved inside part of the foot, the instep, is the most sexy part so I like to close the heel and reveal the arch." "According to fashion insiders, "toe-cleavage shoes sans stockings" are part of the "unwritten dress code" of the "Voguette", as dictated by the magazine's longtime editor in chief Anna Wintour – "even in the bitter New York winter".

Fashion advice also centers around the amount of appropriate toe cleavage. A pump (court shoe) with a "slightly low vamp for a hint of toe cleavage" should not be "too racy for a conservative office". Financial guru Suze Orman says it is "the only cleavage that should be shown around an office".

The implied sexual aspects also come into play for some. Dominatrix Claudia Varrin references the attraction to "stiletto pumps with the low vamp" that allow "lots of toe cleavage". American lingerie brand Frederick's of Hollywood has promoted open-toe shoes as "sexually suggestive" due to the toe cleavage.
