= The Cleft =

2007 novel by Doris Lessing

- First edition
- Author: Doris Lessing
- Language: English
- Publisher: Fourth Estate
- Publication date: 2007
- Publication place: United Kingdom
- Media type: Print (hardback & paperback)
- ISBN: 978-0-00-723343-4

The Cleft (2007) is a novel by Doris Lessing.

== Plot summary ==
The story is narrated by a Roman historian, during the time of the Emperor Nero. He tells the story as a secret history of humanity's beginnings, as pieced together from scraps of documents and oral histories, passed down through the ages.

In the beginning, humanity was composed solely of females who reproduced asexually. They were at peace and had few problems. They lived by the sea and were partially aquatic. They called themselves "Clefts," after The Cleft: a fissure in a rock which the females deemed sacred, and which resembled a vagina.

One day, a Cleft gave birth to a male child, which they called a "monster." They were so frightened that they killed the boy. But more "monsters" were born, and the Clefts left them on a rock to die. Eagles, which lived nearby, saw the dying babies and swooped down and carried them off, to deposit them in a nearby valley where they were then suckled by benevolent deer. The children gradually grew older and able to fend for themselves. Soon, as more boys were brought by the eagles, a tribe emerged.

One day, a female wandered over to the valley and was raped by the now-adult men. She fled and gave birth to a new, mixed child nine months later. When she told her story to the rest of the Clefts, the two tribes soon came into contact with each other. The matriarchs of the Clefts, however, feared the "monsters" and decided to try to kill them off.
