= Jülich-Cleves-Berg =

Jülich-Cleves-Berg can refer to one of two historical territories:

- United Duchies of Jülich-Cleves-Berg (1521–1614), a state of the Holy Roman Empire
- Province of Jülich-Cleves-Berg (1815–1822), a province of the Kingdom of Prussia
