= Port Penn Historic District =

Historic district in Delaware, United States

- U.S. National Register of Historic Places
- U.S. Historic district
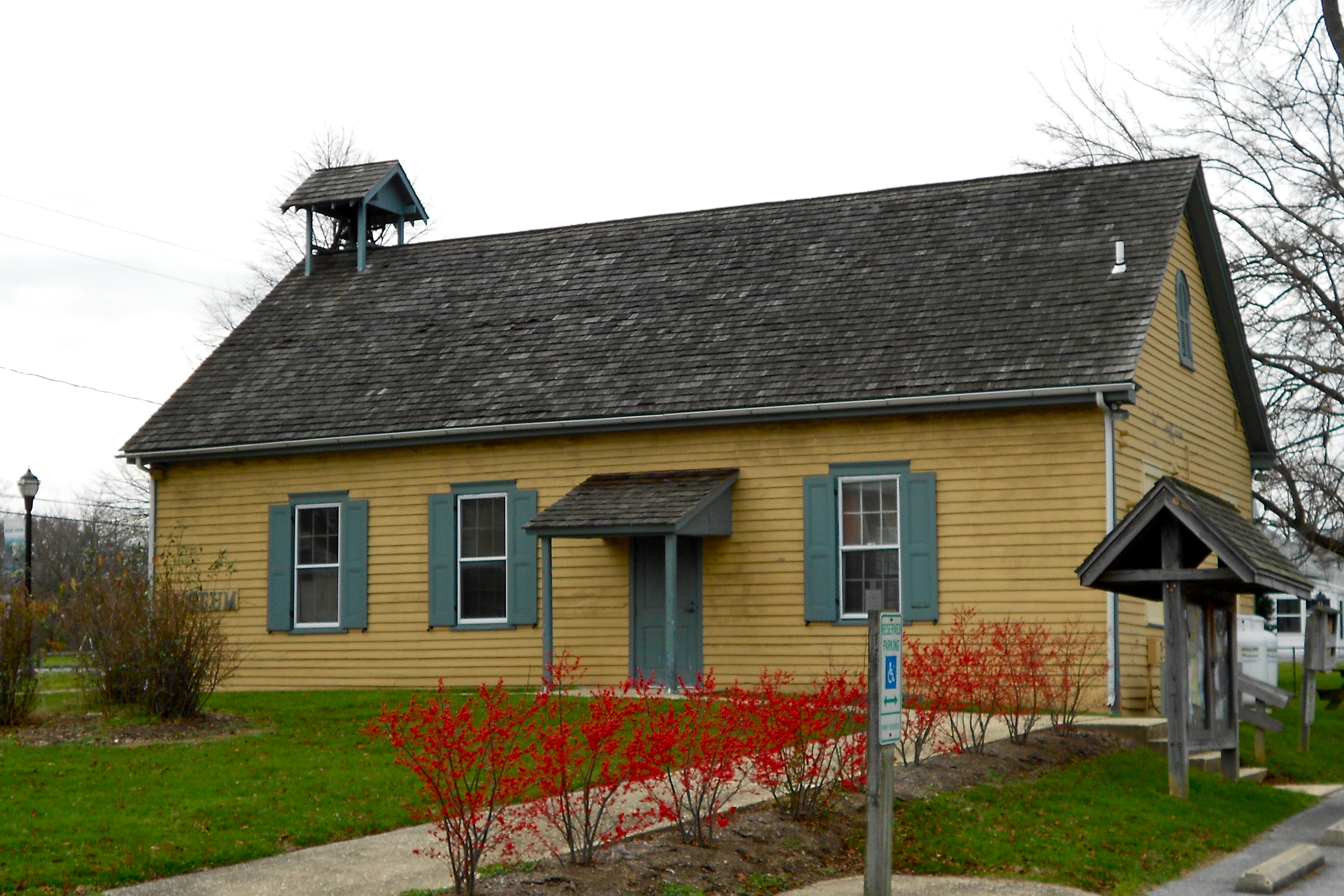
- Port Penn Schoolhouse, Port Penn Historic District, December 2011

- Location within Delaware Location within the United States
- Location: DE 9, Port Penn, Delaware
- Coordinates: 39°30′57″N 75°34′34″W
- Area: 71 acres (29 ha)
- Built: 1764
- Architect: Multiple
- NRHP reference No.: 78000907
- Added to NRHP: November 20, 1978

Port Penn Historic District is a national historic district located at Port Penn, New Castle County, Delaware. It encompasses 48 contributing buildings and 5 contributing sites in the original eight block town plan and one block 19th century extension of Port Penn. The earliest building is the Dr. David Stewart House, dated to 1755. Notable buildings include the Bunlap, or Bendler House (1790s), the Cleaver-Hall House, Eaton House, Presbyterian Parsonage, T. Cleaver House, S. Carpenter House (bef. 1830), Port Penn School, "Linden Hall" (late 1840s ), Commodore's House, Jackson House (c. 1810), Presbyterian Church, Joseph Cleaver House (c. 1835), and St. Daniel's Methodist Church.

It was listed on the National Register of Historic Places in 1978.

== Gallery ==
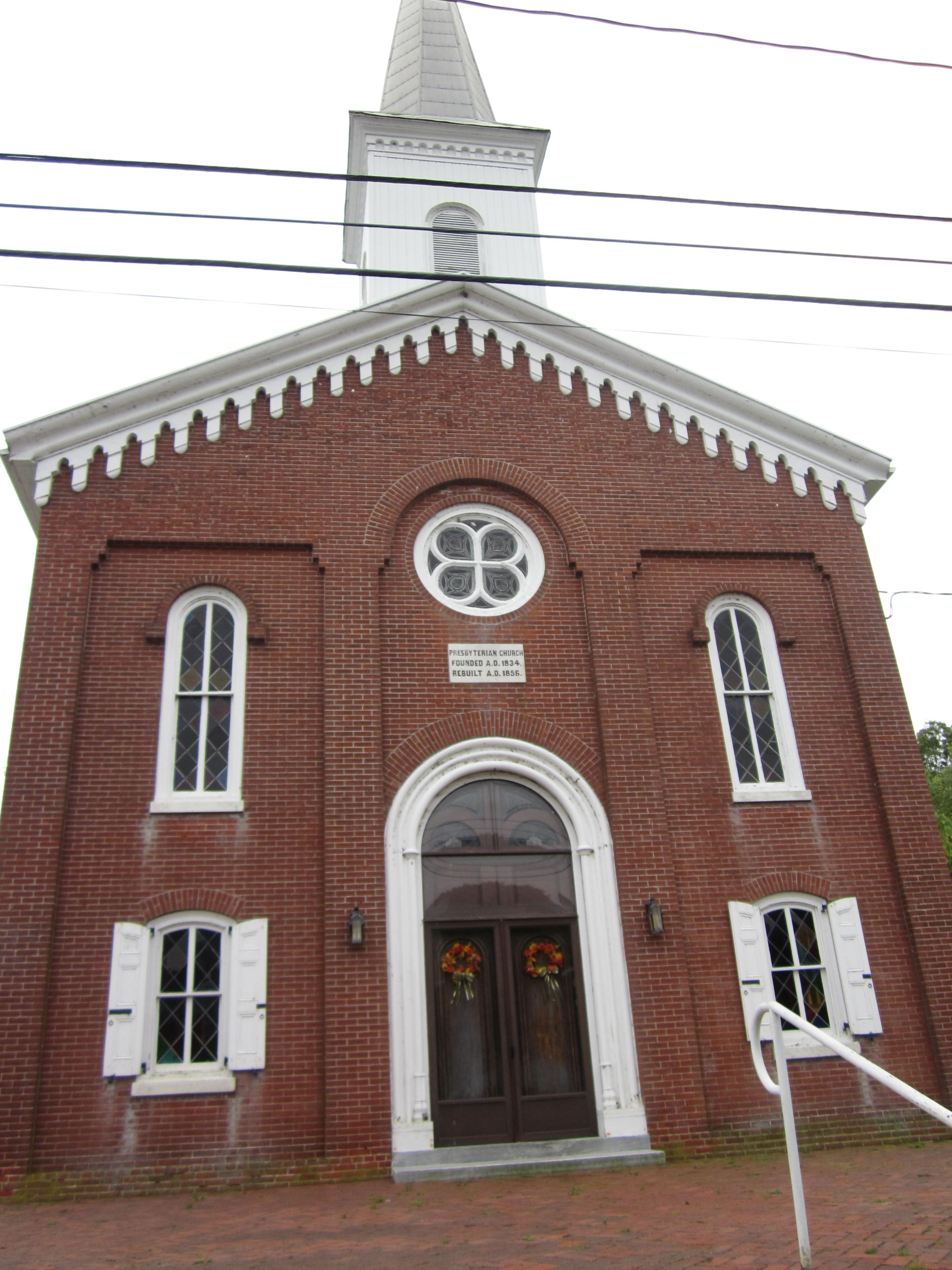
Presbyterian Church

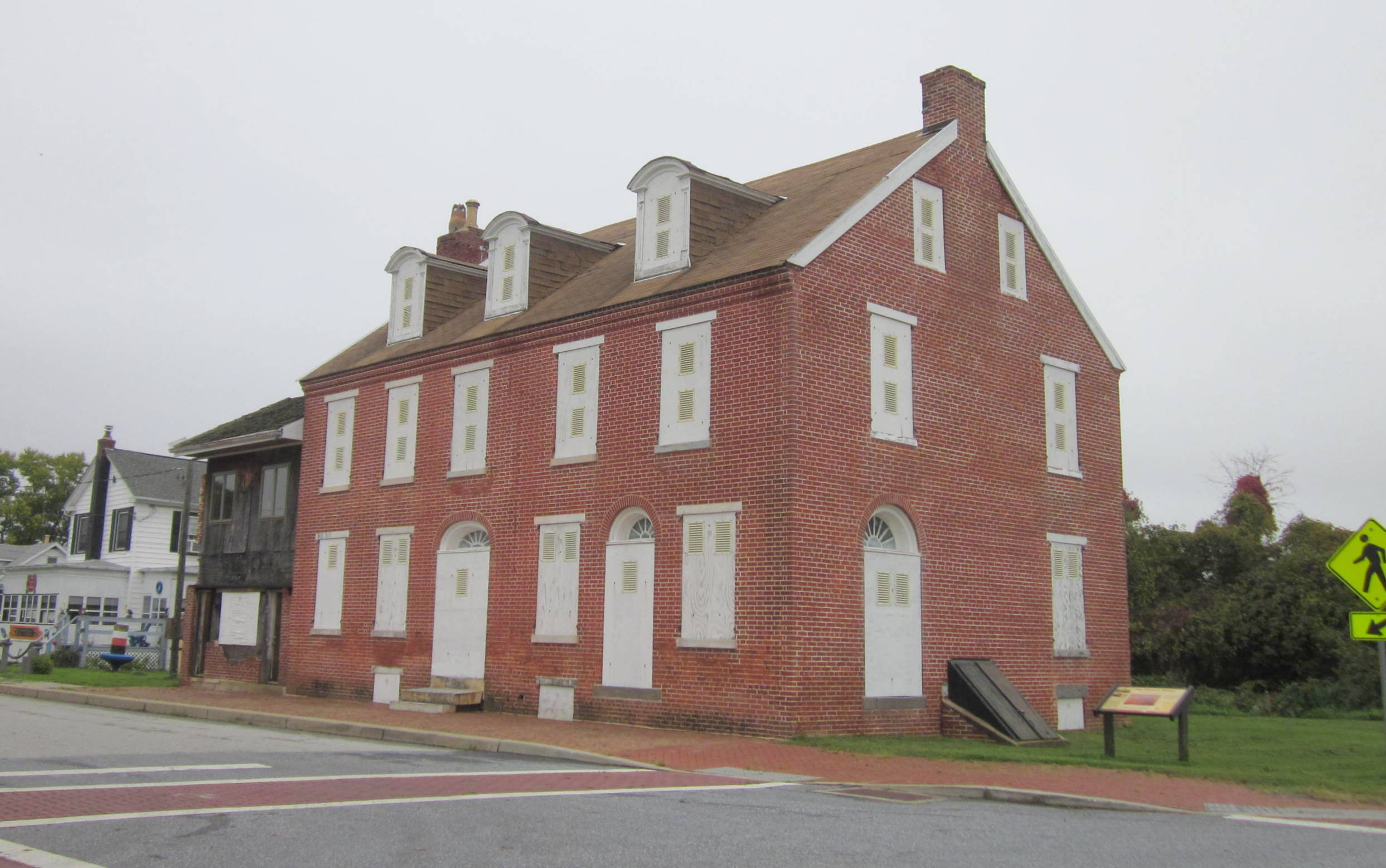
Joseph Cleaver House
