= Cleve (given name) =

Cleve is a given name. Notable people with the name include:

- Cleve Benedict (born 1935), American politician
- Cleve Bryant (1947–2023), American college football quarterback, athletics administrator and former head coach at Ohio University
- Cleve Cartmill (1908–1964), American science fiction and fantasy writer, best remembered for a short story investigated by the FBI
- Cleve Gray (1918–2004), American abstract expressionist painter
- Cleve Jones (born 1954), American AIDS and LGBT rights activist
- Cleve Loney (1950–2020), American politician
- Cleve Moler (1939–2026), American mathematician and computer scientist
