= Cleaver Lake (Timiskaming District) =

Lake in Timiskaming District, Ontario, Canada

- Location in Ontario
- Location: Timiskaming District, Ontario
- Coordinates: 47°47′04″N 80°49′41″W
- Part of: Ottawa River drainage basin
- Primary inflows: Cleaver Creek
- Primary outflows: Cleaver Creek
- Basin countries: Canada
- Max. length: 800 m (2,600 ft)
- Max. width: 150 m (490 ft)
- Surface elevation: 329 m (1,079 ft)

Cleaver Lake is a lake in the Unorganized West Part of Timiskaming District in Northeastern Ontario, Canada. It is about 800 metres (2,600 ft) long and 150 metres (490 ft) wide, and lies at an elevation of 329 metres (1,079 ft) about 16 kilometres (10 mi) northwest of the community of Gowganda and about 21.7 kilometres (13.5 mi) southwest of Matachewan. The primary inflow and outflow is Cleaver Creek, which flows into the West Montreal River, a tributary of the Montreal River and part of the Ottawa River system.
