= Cleaver (surname) =

Cleaver is a surname which may refer to:

== People ==
- Anna Cleaver, New Zealand triathlete
- Sir Anthony Cleaver (1938–2025), British engineer and businessman
- Billy Cleaver (1921–2003), Welsh rugby union player
- Eldridge Cleaver (1935–1998), American writer and political activist
- Emanuel Cleaver (born 1944), U.S. Representative for Missouri and United Methodist pastor
- Euseby Cleaver (1746–1819), Anglican Archbishop of Dublin
- Fred Cleaver (1885–1968), English footballer
- Gerald Cleaver (musician) (born 1963), African-American jazz drummer
- Gordon Cleaver (1910–1994), British Second World War fighter ace and skier
- Harry Cleaver (born 1944), American Marxian economics retired professor
- Harry Cleaver (footballer) (1880–?), English footballer
- Hiram Cleaver (1801–1877), American politician from Pennsylvania
- Hughes Cleaver (1892–1980), Canadian politician
- Kathleen Cleaver (born 1945), American law professor
- Naomi Cleaver (born 1967), British design consultant and interior designer
- Richard Cleaver (1917–2006), Australian politician
- Skip Cleaver (1944–2022), American politician
- Solomon Cleaver (1855–1939), Canadian minister and storyteller
- Sue Cleaver (born 1965), English actress
- Val Cleaver (1917–1977), British rocket engineer
- William Cleaver (1742–1815), English bishop and academic

== Fictional characters ==
- The Cleavers, a family from the American television sitcom Leave It to Beaver:
  - June Cleaver, Theodore's mother
  - Theodore Cleaver, the title character, a boy nicknamed "Beaver"
  - Wally Cleaver, Theodore's older brother
  - Ward Cleaver, Theodore's father
