= Cleeve Hill SSSI, Berkshire =

Protected area in Berkshire, England

Cleeve Hill
- Site of Special Scientific Interest
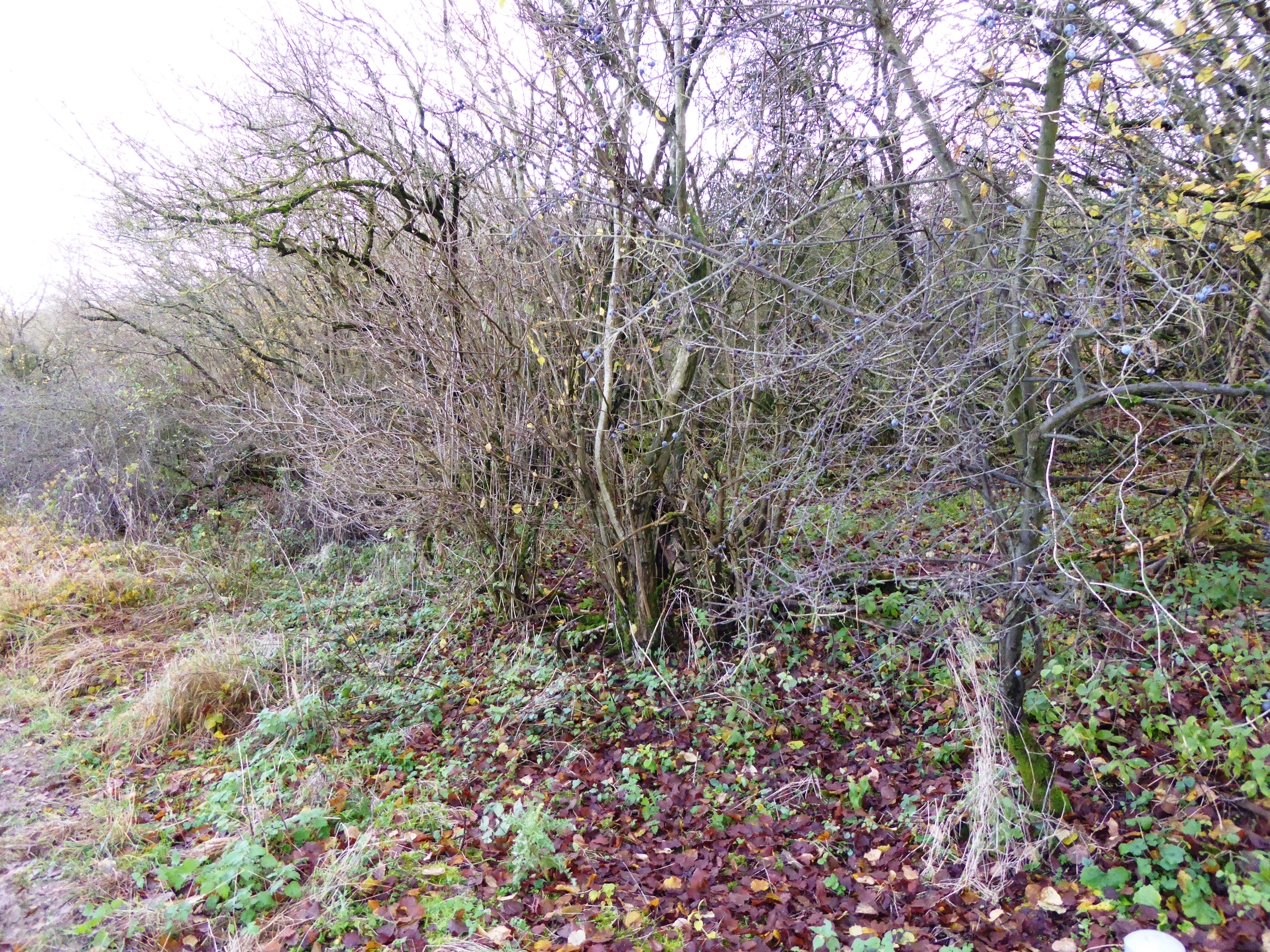

- Location within Berkshire
- Location of Cleeve Hill.
- Area of search: Berkshire
- Grid reference: SU 332 765
- Coordinates: 51.486°N 1.523°W
- Interest: Biological
- Area: 4.0 hectares (9.9 acres)
- Notification date: 1983
- Location map: Magic Map

Cleeve Hill is a 4-hectare (9.9-acre) biological Site of Special Scientific Interest south of Lambourn in Berkshire.

Cleeve Hill is a sloping chalk grassland site with mixed scrub in the northern part. It is in the North Wessex Downs, which is an Area of Outstanding Natural Beauty.

== Fauna ==
The site has the following fauna:

=== Invertebrates ===
- Dark green fritillary
- Melanargia galathea
- Cupido minimus

== Flora ==
The site has the following flora:

- Zerna erecta
- Brachypodium sylvaticum
- Crataegus monogyna
- Cornus sanguinea
- Viburnum lantana
- Corylus avellana
- Campanula glomerata
- Carlina vulgaris
- Dactylorhiza fuchsii
- Helianthemum chamaecistus
- Linum catharticum
- Lotus corniculatus
- Pimpinella saxifraga
- Primula veris
- Thymus drucei
- Thymus pulegioides
- Scabiosa columbaria
- Succisa pratensis
- Gentianella amarella
- Gentianella germanica
- Platanthera chlorantha
- Listera ovata
