= Kleve =

Town in North Rhine-Westphalia, Germany

- Town
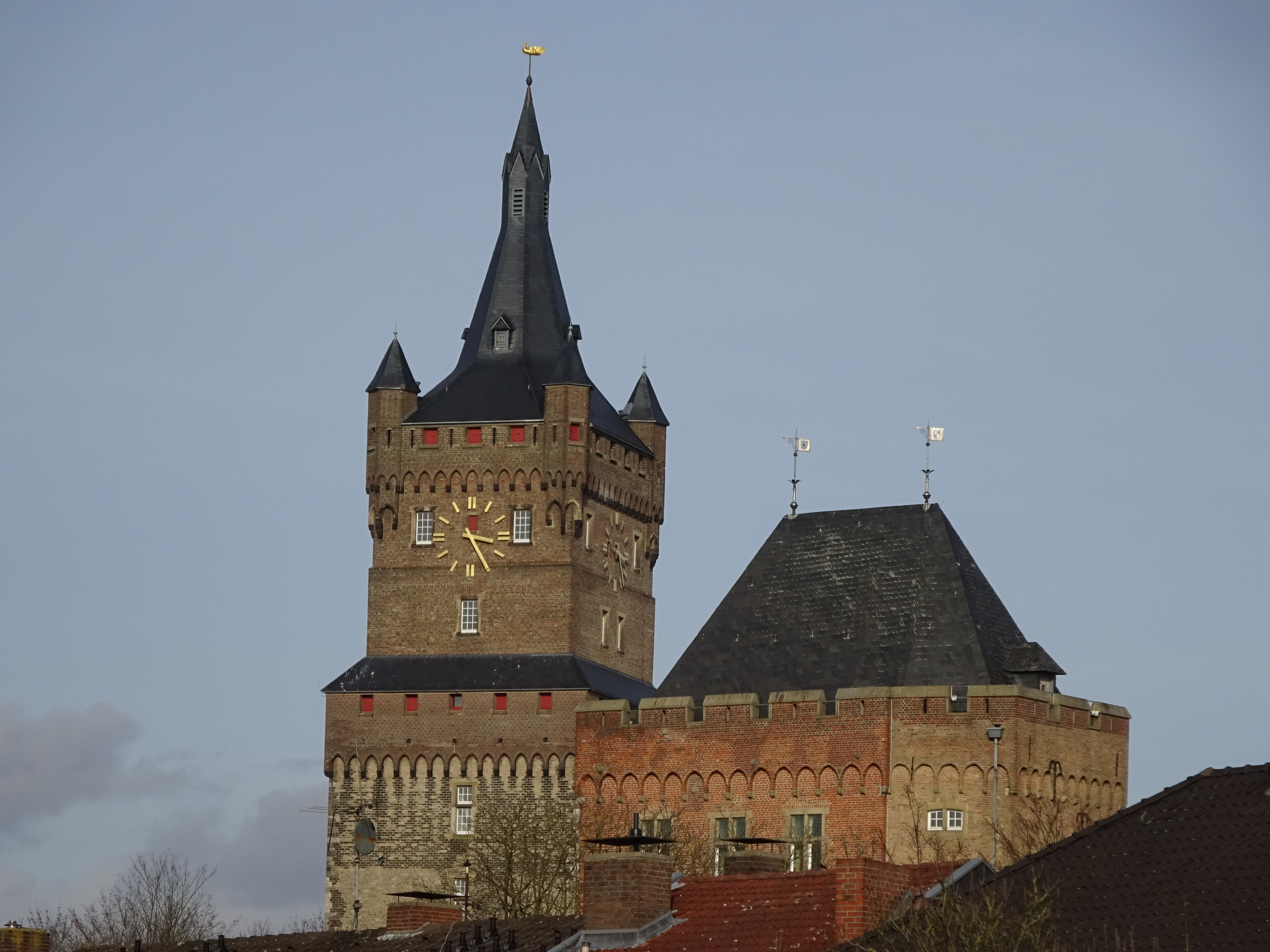
- Schwanenburg Castle

- Flag Coat of arms

- Location of Kleve within Kleve district
- Interactive map of Kleve
- Location within Germany Location within North Rhine-Westphalia
- Coordinates: 51°47′24″N 06°08′24″E
- Country: Germany
- State: North Rhine-Westphalia
- Admin. region: Düsseldorf
- District: Kleve

Government
  - Mayor (2025–30): Markus Dahmen

Area
  - Total: 97.76 km^{2} (37.75 sq mi)
- Elevation: 12 m (39 ft)

Population (2025-12-31)
  - Total: 53,094
  - Density: 543.1/km^{2} (1,407/sq mi)
- Time zone: UTC+01:00 (CET)
  - Summer (DST): UTC+02:00 (CEST)
- Postal codes: 47533
- Dialling codes: 0 28 21
- Vehicle registration: KLE
- Website: www.kleve.de

Kleve (German pronunciation: [ˈkleːvə]; traditional English: Cleves /kliːvz/ KLEEVZ; Dutch: Kleef [ˈkleːf]; French: Clèves [klɛv]; Spanish: Cléveris; Latin: Clivia; Low Rhenish: Kleff) is a town in the Lower Rhine region of northwestern Germany near the Dutch border and the River Rhine. From the 11th century onwards, Cleves was capital of a county and later a duchy. Today, Cleves is the capital of the district of Kleve in the German state of North Rhine-Westphalia. The city is home to one of the campuses of the Rhine-Waal University of Applied Sciences.

== Territory of the municipality ==
In addition to the inner city, the territory of Kleve comprises fourteen villages and populated places: Bimmen, Brienen, Donsbrüggen, Düffelward, Griethausen, Keeken, Kellen, Materborn, Reichswalde, Rindern, Salmorth, Schenkenschanz, Warbeyen and Wardhausen.

== History ==
The name Kleff probably derives from Middle Dutch clef, clif 'cliff, bluff', referring to the promontory on which the Schwanenburg castle was constructed. Since the city's coat of arms displays three clover leaves (German Klee, Low German Kliev), the city's name is sometimes linked by folk etymology to the clover, but the corresponding Dutch word is klaver.

The Schwanenburg Castle, which was the residence of the Counts and later the Dukes of Cleves, stands on a steep hill. It is located at the northern terminus of the Kermisdahl where it joins with the Spoykanal, which was previously an important transportation link to the Rhine. The old castle has a massive tower, the Schwanenturm 180 feet (55 m) high, that is associated in legend with the Knight of the Swan, immortalized in Richard Wagner's Lohengrin.

Medieval Kleve grew together from four parts – the Schwanenburg Castle, the village below the castle, the first city of Kleve on Heideberg Hill, and the Neustadt ("New City"), dating from the 14th century. In 1242 Kleve received city rights. The County of Cleves, which roughly covered today's districts of Kleve, Wesel and Duisburg, was united with the Duchy of Mark in 1368. It was made a duchy itself in 1417, then united with the neighboring duchies of Jülich and Berg in 1521, when John III, Duke of Cleves, married Mary, heiress of Jülich-Berg-Ravenburg.

Kleve's most famous native was Anne of Cleves (1515–1557), daughter of John III, Duke of Cleves and (briefly) the fourth wife of Henry VIII of England. Several local businesses are named after her, including the Anne von Kleve Galerie.

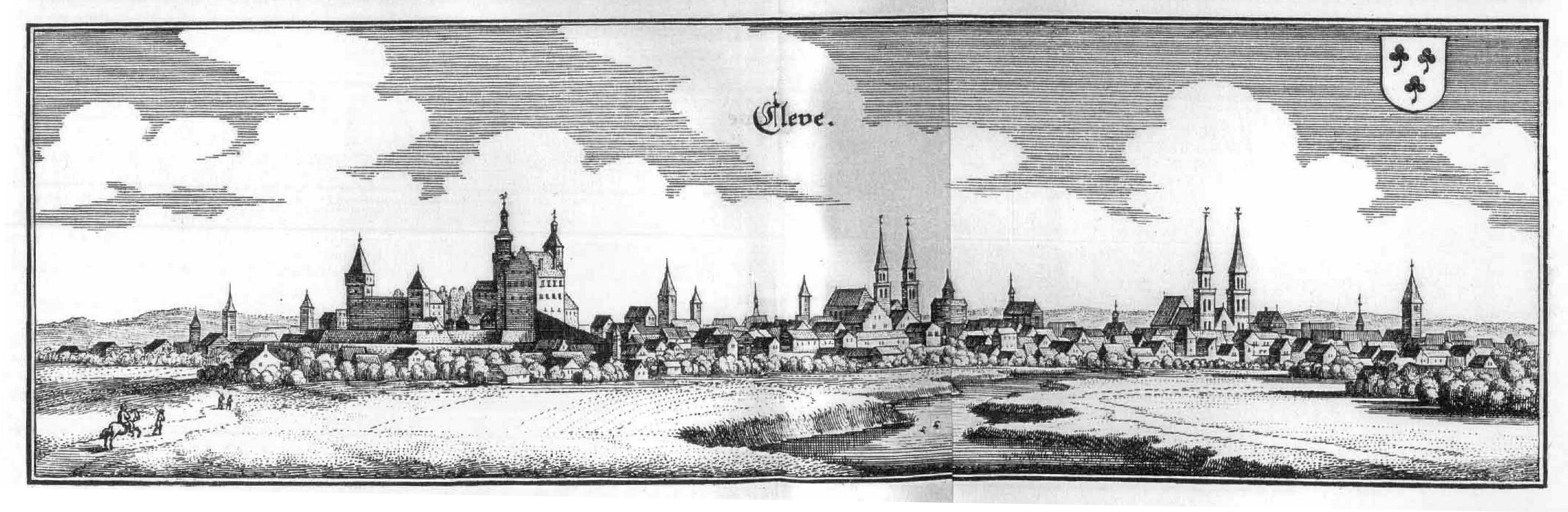
Cleves in the 17th century

The ducal dynasty became extinct in the male line in 1609, leading to a succession crisis in the duchies: the War of the Jülich Succession (1609–1614). After the Thirty Years' War ended in 1648, the succession dispute was resolved with Cleves passing to the elector of Brandenburg, thus becoming an exclave of the Margraviate of Brandenburg, later Brandenburg-Prussia.

During the Thirty Years' War the city had been under the control of the Dutch Republic, which in 1647 had given Johann Moritz von Nassau-Siegen administrative control over the city. He approved a renovation of Schwanenburg Castle in the baroque style, constructed a baroque palace, the Prinzenhof, and commissioned the construction of extensive gardens that greatly influenced European landscape design. Significant amounts of his original plan for Kleve were put into effect and have been maintained to the present, a particularly well-loved example of which is the Forstgarten (Forest Garden). In 1685, a commune of French Huguenots was established in the town, and French church services were held in the castle. In 1701, Cleves became part of the Kingdom of Prussia.

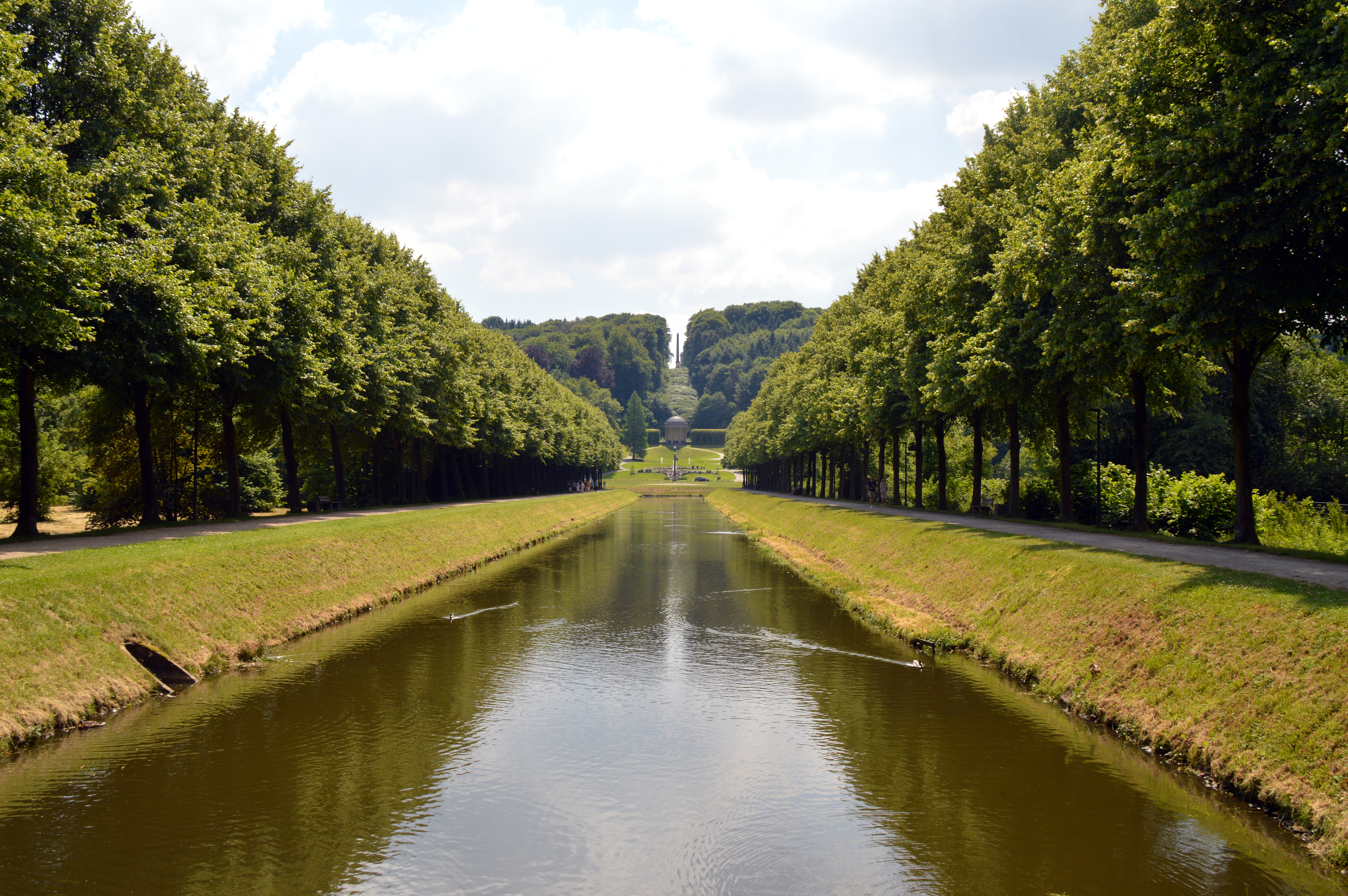
Mid 17th century Forest Garden

During the War of the First Coalition, Cleves was captured by French Revolutionary troops on 19 October 1794. In 1795 it was incorporated into the Roer department, which became part of the Cisrhenian Republic in 1797, which in turn was formally annexed by the French First Republic in 1802, becoming the French First Empire in 1804. Prussia retrieved the city in 1815.

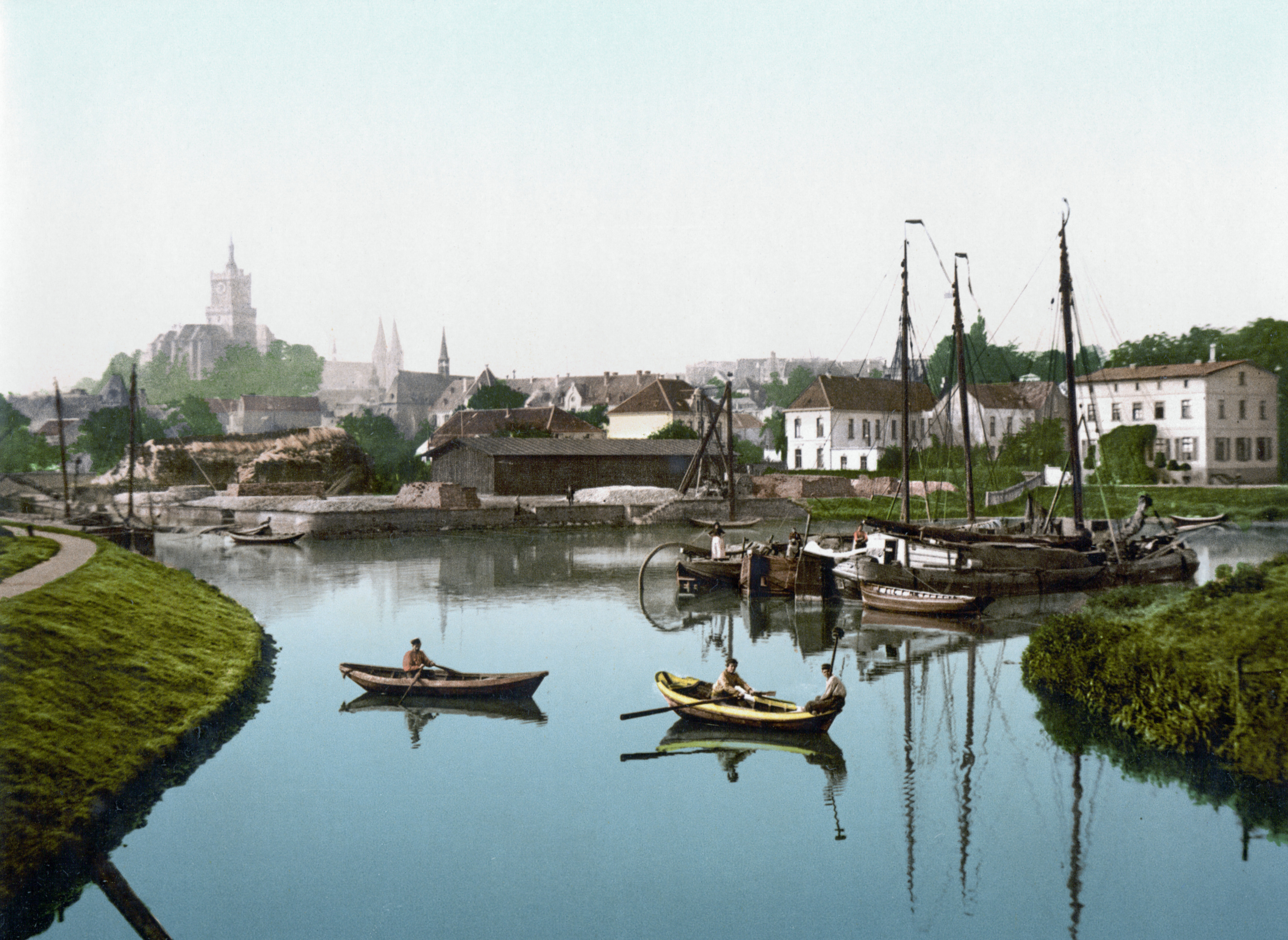
City and port of Kleve (c. 1895)

The mineral waters of Kleve and the wooded parkland surrounding it made it a fashionable spa in the 19th century. At this time, Kleve was named "Bad Cleve" (English: Spa of Cleves). It was not until 1935 when the German spelling of its name was officially changed from Cleve to Kleve.

During World War II Kleve was the site of one of the two radio wave stations that served the Knickebein aircraft navigation system. Luftwaffe bombers used radio beams from Kleve and a second station at Stolberg to navigate to British targets. The Knickebein system was eventually jammed by the British. It was replaced by the higher frequency X-Gerät system, which used transmitter stations located on the channel coast of France.

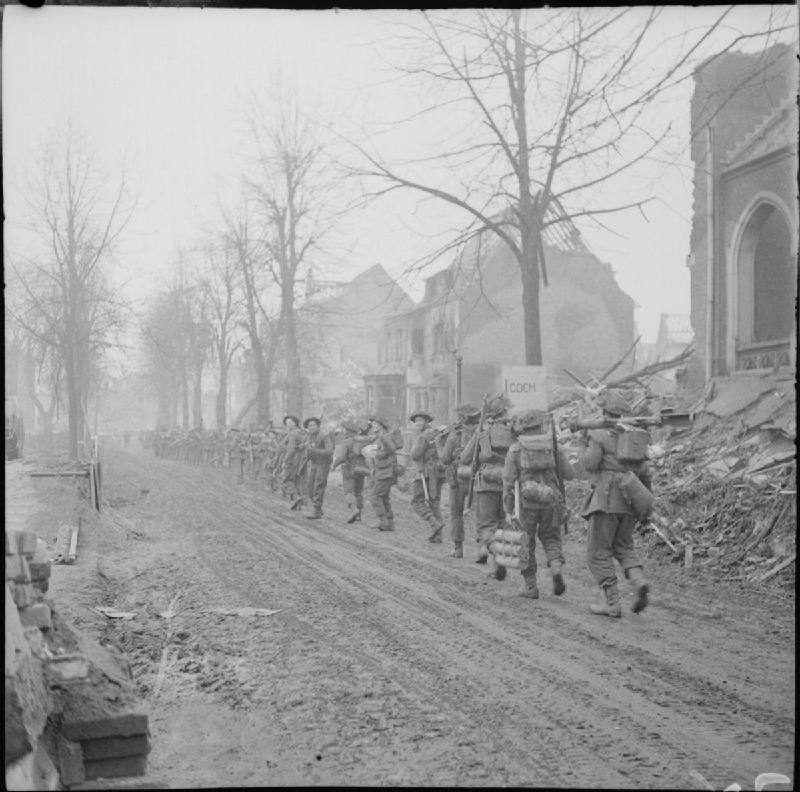
British infantry advance through bombed-out Kleve, February 1945

Kleve was heavily bombed during the Second World War, and over 90% of buildings in the city were severely damaged. During a raid on 7 October 1944 a Halifax bomber crashed into the Schwanenburg Castle. Most of the destruction was the result of a raid late in the war in 1945, conducted at the request of Lieutenant-General Brian Horrocks in preparation for Operation Veritable. Horrocks recounted his decision in the 1973 television documentary The World at War:

"Then they came to me and they said, 'Do you want the town of Cleve taken out?' By 'taken out' they meant the whole of the heavy bombers putting on to Cleve. Now, I knew that Cleve was a very fine old historical German town. Anne of Cleve, one of Henry VIII's wives, came from there. I knew that there were a lot of civilians in Cleve, men, women and children. If I said no, they would live. If I said yes, they would die. A terrible decision you’ve got to take. But... everything depended on getting a high piece of ground at Nütterden. The German reserves would have to come through Cleve, and we would have to breach the Siegfried Line and get there. And your own lives, your own troops, must come first, so I said yes, I did want it taken out. But when all those bombers went over, the night just before zero hour, to take out Cleve, I felt a murderer. And after the war I had an awful lot of nightmares, but always Cleve."

Horrocks later said that this had been "the most terrible decision I had ever taken in my life" and that he felt "physically sick" when he saw the bombers overhead.

As a result of the bombing, and subsequent fighting in the town (notably by the 129th Brigade of the 43rd Wessex Division, which entered the town in error on 10 February), relatively little of the pre-1945 city remains. Those structures spared include a number of historic villas built during the heyday of the spa Bad Kleve, located along the B9 near the Tiergarten. Of those buildings destroyed, many were reconstructed, including most of the Schwanenburg and the Stiftskirche, the Catholic parish church. Constructed on high ground, many of these landmarks can be seen from the surrounding communities.

Since 1953 there has been a broadcasting facility for FM radio and television from regional broadcaster WDR near Kleve. The current aerial mast was brought into service in 1993. The steel tube mast rises 126.4 metres high and has a diameter of 1.6 metres. It is stabilized by guy wires attached at 57 and 101.6 metres height.

After the Second World War important employers in the area were associated with the West German "Economic Miracle" (Wirtschaftswunder), and included the XOX Bisquitfabrik (XOX Biscuit Factory) GmbH and the Van den Berg'schen Margerinewerke (Van den Berg's Margarine Factory). Another important employer was the Elefanten-Kinderschuhfabrik (Elephant Children's Shoe Factory).

Retail became an increasingly important industry, particularly after the institution of the euro in 2002. Dutch citizens often crossed the open border to patronize Kleves retailers, and much of the euros spent on shopping in Kleve came from the Netherlands. Lower costs of real estate have attracted a wave of Dutch citizens, who purchased houses in the area.

== Demographics ==
Historical population

Year	Pop.	±% p.a.
1815	6,517	—
1832	6,990	+0.41%
1867	9,209	+0.79%
1898	13,724	+1.30%
1910	18,135	+2.35%
1920	19,453	+0.70%
1930	21,561	+1.03%
1939	21,784	+0.11%
1950	28,740	+2.55%
1960	21,129	−3.03%
1965	42,112	+14.79%
1970	43,640	+0.72%

Year	Pop.	±% p.a.
1975	44,041	+0.18%
1980	44,022	−0.01%
1985	44,548	+0.24%
1990	45,963	+0.63%
1995	48,344	+1.02%
2000	48,662	+0.13%
2005	49,099	+0.18%
2010	49,477	+0.15%
2015	49,729	+0.10%
2020	52,359	+1.04%
2025	53,094	+0.28%

Source: Landesdatabank Nordrhein-Westfalen (1965-2025)

=== Census data ===
As of 2025, 53,094 people resided in the city. As of 2013 86.7% of the residents had the German citizenship (including residents with dual citizenship) and 10.1% another EU citizenship (5.6% Dutch and 2.9% Polish).

In the city, in 2013, the population was distributed with 19.7% under the age of 21, 25.6% from 21 to 40, 29.7% from 41 to 60, 20.1% from 61 to 80, and 4.9% who were 81 years of age or older. For every 100 females, there were 96.7 males. For every 100 females age 21 and over, there were 93.9 males.

81.3% of the citizens lived in households without children under the age of 18, 9.2% with one child, 6.1% with two children, 1.7% with three children, and 0.1% with four children or more.

=== Religion ===
Like the rest of the Lower Rhine region, Kleve is a predominantly Roman Catholic city. The city is part of the Diocese of Münster. 61.1% of the residents are Roman Catholics, 14.4% Protestant, and 24.6% "Other". The largest section of this group are residents without any religious affiliation, but there are also sizeable Russian Orthodox and Muslim communities in Kleve.

The synagogue of Kleve was destroyed during Kristallnacht and is today commemorated on the Synagogenplatz (Synagogue square) on which the building's outline can be seen. The fifty killed Jewish citizens of Cleves are remembered with signs that tell their names, and dates and places of death.

In 1767 the town was at the center of a controversy between prominent European rabbis, known as "The Kleve Divorce", over the legality of a divorce granted by a groom whose sanity was in doubt.

== Gallery ==
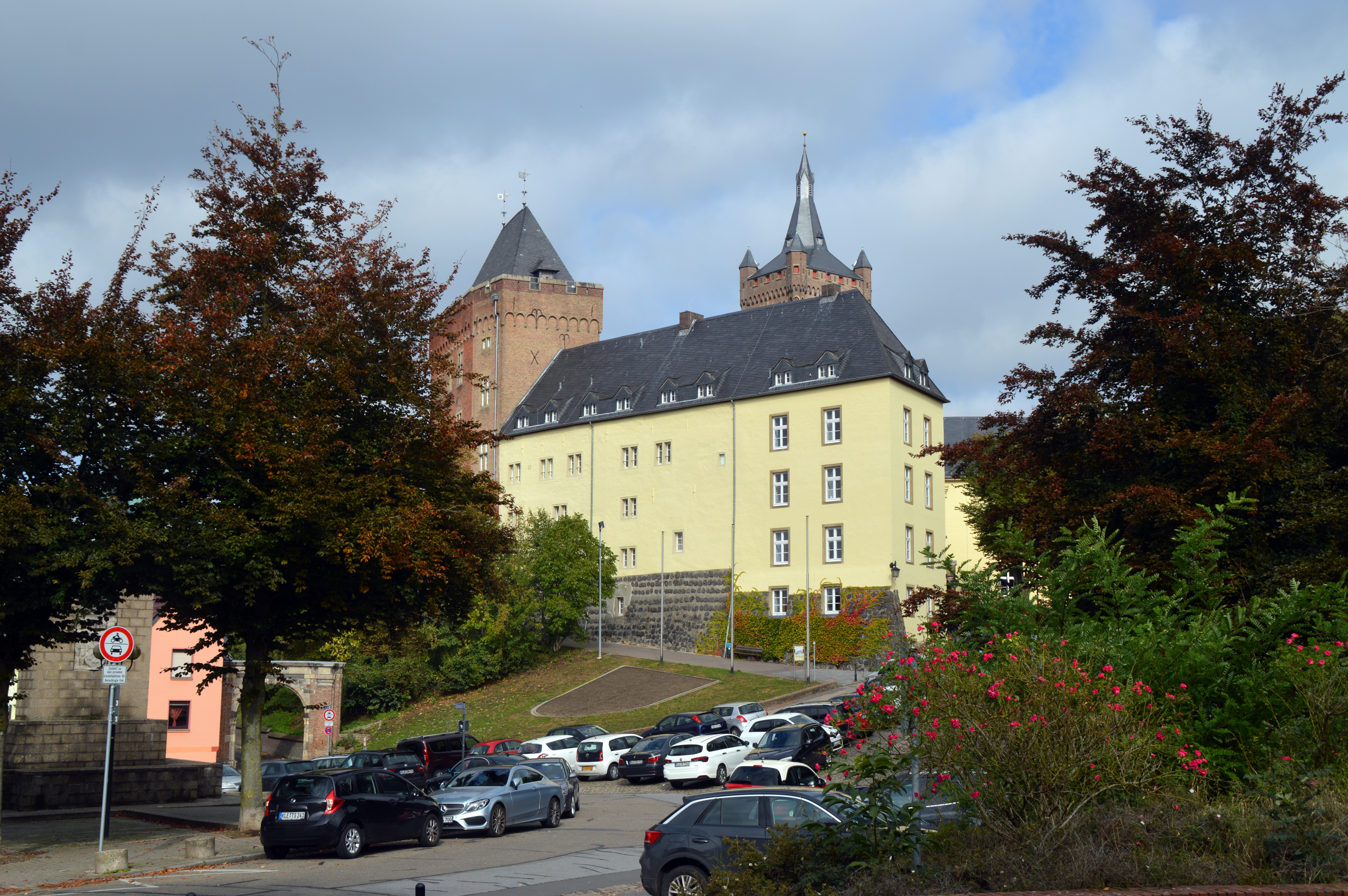
Schwanenburg Castle

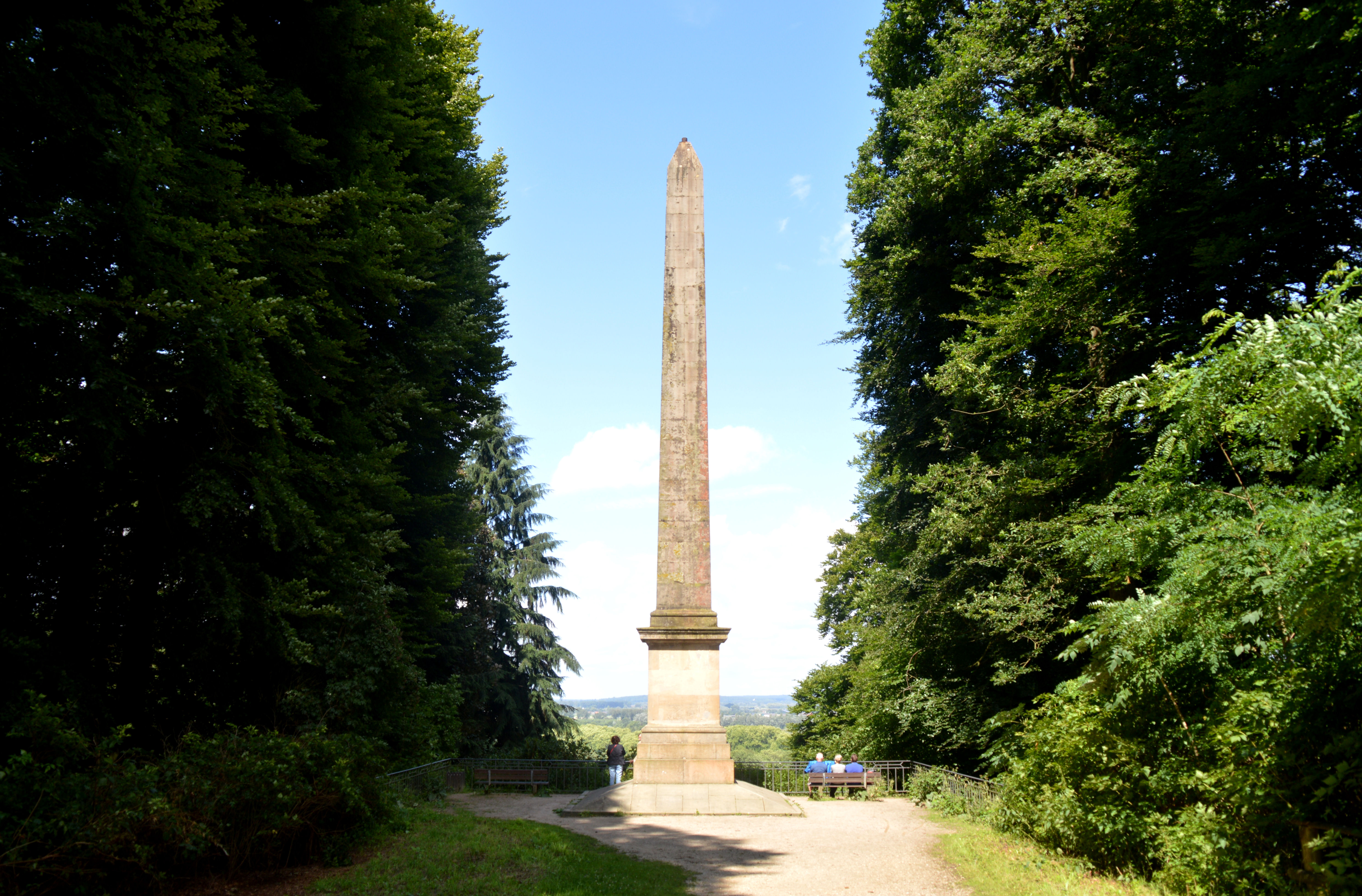
Forest Garden

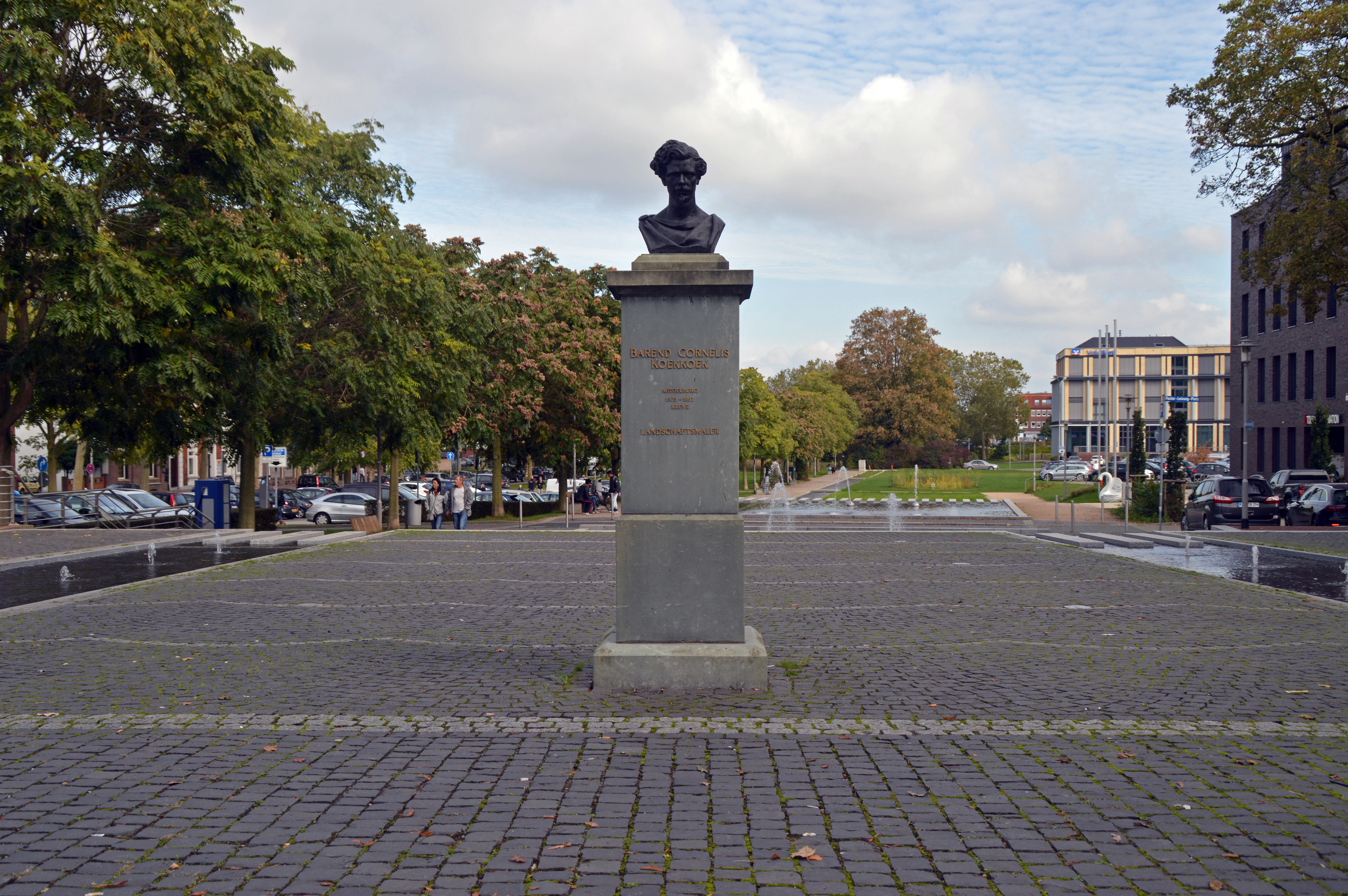
Bust Barend Cornelis Koekkoek

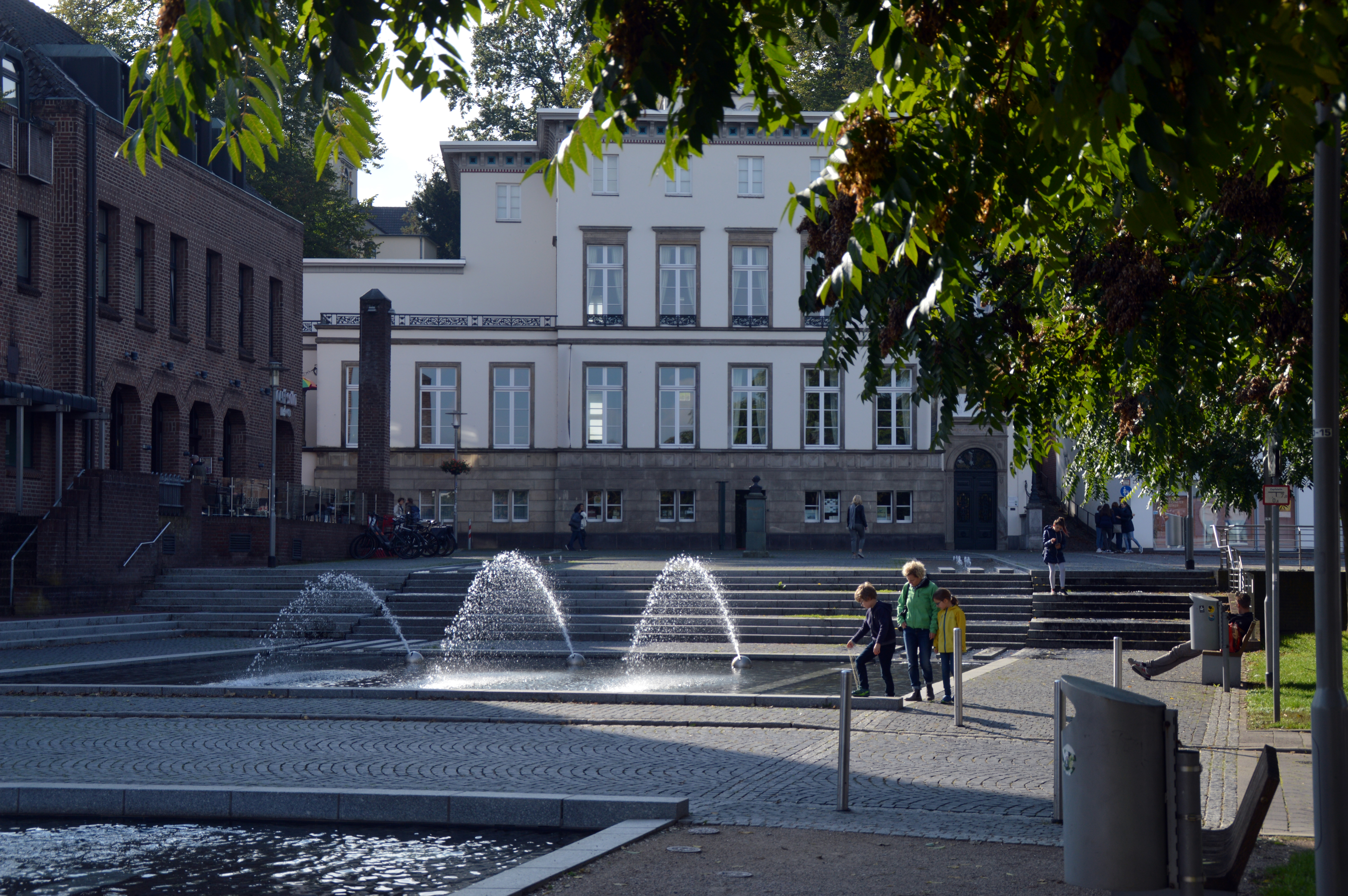
Museum Haus Koekkoek

== Climate ==
Climate data for Kleve (1991-2020)
Month	Jan	Feb	Mar	Apr	May	Jun	Jul	Aug	Sep	Oct	Nov	Dec	Year
Daily mean °C (°F)	3.0 (37.4)	3.5 (38.3)	6.3 (43.3)	10.0 (50.0)	13.6 (56.5)	16.5 (61.7)	18.5 (65.3)	17.9 (64.2)	14.6 (58.3)	10.6 (51.1)	6.6 (43.9)	3.7 (38.7)	10.4 (50.7)
Average precipitation mm (inches)	70.4 (2.77)	63.8 (2.51)	56.5 (2.22)	44.2 (1.74)	62.0 (2.44)	70.1 (2.76)	81.8 (3.22)	79.9 (3.15)	67.9 (2.67)	70.6 (2.78)	71.4 (2.81)	80.1 (3.15)	818.7 (32.22)
Mean monthly sunshine hours	53	73	125	178	212	212	218	201	153	111	59	43	1,638
Source: Deutscher Wetterdienst

== Government ==
=== City Council ===
Prior to the Nazi Era, Kleve's local politics were dominated by the Catholic Centre Party. This situation continued with the Christian Democratic successor party CDU after the Second World War, in spite of resettled displaced people from eastern Germany, most of them Protestants. Until 2004 the CDU controlled an absolute majority of the city council.

Since the last local elections on 14 September 2025 the following parties are represented in Cleves' city council. In addition to nationwide parties, Offene Klever (Open Cleves) has a number of seats.

Party	%	Seats
CDU (Christian Democrats)	37.34	23
Green Party	13.13	8
SPD (Social Democrats)	17.29	11
Open Cleves	5.63	3
FDP (Liberals)	4.01	2
AfD (Far-Right)	13.69	8
Participation: 43.62%

The next local elections are scheduled for 2030.

=== Mayor ===
In 2015, Sonja Northing (no party affiliation) became mayor of Kleve, with 64.5% of the vote. Her candidacy was supported by the SPD and FDP, and opposed by CDU and Green Party candidates. Northing was the first mayor of Cleves since World War II who was not a CDU member. In 2020 Wolfgang Gebing (CDU) was elected mayor. In 2025 Markus Dahmen was elected mayor.

== Language and dialect ==
The native language of Kleve and much of the Lower Rhine region is a Low Franconian dialect known as Kleverlandish (Dutch: Kleverlands, German: Kleverländisch), but the official language is Standard High German, which is dominant among the younger generation.

Because of its geographical location at the Dutch-German border, there is a strong overlap in culture and language. One example of this is Govert Flinck (1615–1660), who though born in Kleve established himself as a Dutch artist. On the other hand, the Dutch artist Barend Cornelis Koekkoek (1803–1862) settled in Kleve and became a successful landscape painter. His works are collected by and exhibited in the local museum Haus Koekkoek for his and others' romantic paintings.

== Twin towns – sister cities ==
Kleve is twinned with:

- Ameland, Friesland, Netherlands
- Fitchburg, Massachusetts, United States
- Ronse, East Flanders, Belgium
- Worcester, England, United Kingdom

== Notable people ==
- Marie of Cleves, Duchess of Orléans (1426–1487), mother of king Louis XII of France
- Johannes von Soest (1448–1506), medieval musician, music theorist, poet, and composer
- Duke Englebert of Cleves (1462–1506), Count of Nevers
- Anne of Cleves (1515–1557), fourth wife of Henry VIII
- Marie Eleonore of Cleves (1550–1608), Duchess Consort of Prussia
- Govaert Flinck (1615–1660), Dutch painter, worked in Kleve
- John Maurice, Prince of Nassau-Siegen, governor of the Duchy of Cleves from 1648 till 1679, who constructed the Prinzenhof palace and the baroque gardens
- Anacharsis Cloots (1755–1794), nobleman, politician and French revolutionary
- Heinrich Vohs (c. 1763–1804), actor and singer
- Joachim Murat (1767–1815), Grand Duke of Grand Duchy of Berg during the Napoleonic years
- Heinrich Berghaus (1797–1884), cartographer
- Joseph Beuys (1921–1986), artist, grew up in Kleve
- Karl Leisner (1915–1945), Roman Catholic martyr and beatified by Pope John Paul II, grew up in Kleve
- Willi Lippens (born 1945), footballer
- Jürgen Möllemann (1945–2003), politician (FDP), Federal Minister
- Barbara Hendricks (born 1952), politician (SPD), Federal Minister
- Klaus Steinbach (born 1953), swimmer, president of the German Olympic Sports Confederation in 2002–2006
- Tina Theune (born 1953), football coach
- Rainer Rauffmann (born 1967), former football forward most known with Omonia Nicosia in Cyprus

== See also ==
- Get of Cleves
- Kleve transmitter
