= List of cemeteries in Delaware =

This is a list of cemeteries in Delaware, United States.

Name	Coordinates	Elevation	Hundred	Municipality	Borough or Census Area	Unincorporated Community
African Union Church Cemetery	39°34′03″N 75°35′35″W	3 feet (0.91 m)	Red Lion Hundred	Delaware City	Delaware City	
African Union First Methodist Cemetery	39°39′18″N 75°39′17″W	69 feet (21 m)	New Castle Hundred		Bear	
A. U. M. P. Church Cemetery, see Newport Cemetery						
All Saints Cemetery	39°42′42″N 75°40′49″W	92 feet (28 m)	Wilmington Hundred	Wilmington	Wilmington	
Appoquinimink Friends Burial Ground	39°27′24″N 75°39′55″W	59 feet (18 m)	St Georges Hundred	Odessa	Odessa	
Ardentown Memorial Garden	39°48′33″N 75°29′01″W	236 feet (72 m)	Brandywine Hundred	Ardentown	Ardentown	
Asbury Cemetery	39°30′23″N 75°38′58″W	69 feet (21 m)	St Georges Hundred	Middletown	Middletown	
Asbury Methodist Episcopal Church Cemetery	39°44′17″N 75°32′56″W	92 feet (28 m)	Wilmington Hundred	Wilmington	Wilmington	
Beth Emeth Memorial Park	39°44′54″N 75°35′28″W	92 feet (28 m)	Christiana Hundred	Wilmington	Wilmington	
Bethany United African Methodist Episcopal Churchyard	39°39′42″N 75°33′59″W	10 feet (3.0 m)	New Castle Hundred	New Castle	New Castle	
Bethel Cemetery	39°39′41″N 75°34′00″W	72 feet (22 m)	New Castle Hundred			Pleasantville
Bethesda United Methodist Church Cemetery	39°26′58″N 75°42′50″W	69 feet (21 m)	St Georges Hundred	Middletown	Middletown	
Brandywine Cemetery, see Wilmington and Brandywine Cemetery						
Cathedral Cemetery	39°44′55″N 75°34′46″W	92 feet (28 m)	Wilmington Hundred	Wilmington	Wilmington	
Centre Friends Burying Ground	39°49′13″N 75°35′58″W	387 feet (118 m)	Christiana Hundred			Centreville
Chesed Shel Emeth Cemetery, see Jewish Community Cemetery						
Chester-Bethel Cemetery	39°49′49″N 75°29′59″W		Brandywine Hundred	Wilmington	Wilmington	
Christ Church Memorial Garden	39°46′40″N 75°34′43″W	256 feet (78 m)	Christiana Hundred		Greenville	
Christ Episcopal Church Cemetery	39°34′31″N 75°35′33″W	3 feet (0.91 m)	Red Lion Hundred	Delaware City	Delaware City	
Christ Our King Church (One Grave)	39°45′37″N 75°32′19″W	92 feet (28 m)	Wilmington Hundred	Wilmington	Wilmington	
Christiana United Methodist Church Cemetery	39°40′01″N 75°39′40″W	30 feet (9.1 m)	Christiana Hundred			Christiana
Christiana Presbyterian Church Cemetery	39°39′58″N 75°39′43″W	30 feet (9.1 m)	Christiana Hundred			Christiana
Coffee Run Cemetery	39°46′03″N 75°39′34″W	256 feet (78 m)	Mill Creek Hundred		Hockessin	
Corbit Family Graveyard	39°27′25″N 75°39′43″W	59 feet (18 m)	St Georges Hundred	Odessa	Odessa	
Dale United Methodist Church Cemetery	39°27′11″N 75°42′49″W	72 feet (22 m)	St Georges Hundred	Middletown	Middletown	
Delaney Cemetery, aka Dulaney Cemetery	39°17′59″N 75°44′49″W	45 feet (14 m)	Blackbird Hundred	Clayton	Clayton	
Delaware City Cemetery	39°34′14″N 75°35′51″W	19 feet (5.8 m)	Red Lion Hundred	Delaware City	Delaware City	
Delaware State Hospital Cemetery	39°42′03″N 75°34′35″W	59 feet (18 m)	New Castle Hundred	New Castle	New Castle	
Delaware Veterans Memorial Cemetery	39°33′00″N 75°44′38″W	59 feet (18 m)	New Castle Hundred		Bear	
Du Pont de Nemours Cemetery (Private)	39°47′03″N 75°34′59″W	259 feet (79 m)	Christiana Hundred	Wilmington	Wilmington	
Ebenezer Cemetery	39°22′01″N 75°43′43″W	91 feet (28 m)	Appoquinimink Hundred			Vandyke
Ebenezer United Methodist Church Cemetery	39°44′01″N 75°43′04″W	288 feet (88 m)	White Clay Hundred	Newark	Newark	
First Presbyterian Churchyard	39°34′43″N 75°35′36″W	26 feet (7.9 m)	Red Lion Hundred	Delaware City	Delaware City	
First Presbyterian Church Remembrance Garden	39°41′13″N 75°45′45″W	147 feet (45 m)	White Clay Hundred	Newark	Newark	
Foreman-Massey Cemetery of Byrd's A.M.E. Church	39°18′57″N 75°38′04″W	27 feet (8.2 m)	Blackbird Hundred	Smyrna	Smyrna	
Forest Presbyterian Church Cemetery	39°27′00″N 75°43′03″W	68 feet (21 m)	St Georges Hundred	Middletown	Middletown	
Friends Meetinghouse Burial Ground	39°44′32″N 75°33′16″W	82 feet (25 m)	Wilmington Hundred	Wilmington	Wilmington	
Friendship United Methodist Episcopal Church Cemetery	39°22′00″N 75°33′52″W	20 feet (6.1 m)	Appoquinimink Hundred			Chambersville
Garden of Praise – Cathedral Church of St John	39°45′8″N 75°32′27″W	48 feet (15 m)	Wilmington Hundred	Wilmington	Wilmington	
Glasgow Methodist Episcopal Cemetery	39°36′30″N 75°44′46″W	67 feet (20 m)	Pencader Hundred		Glasgow	
Glebe Cemetery	39°40′05″N 75°33′34″W	4 feet (1.2 m)	New Castle Hundred	New Castle	New Castle	
Grace Episcopal Church Cemetery	39°49′20″N 75°32′53″W	389 feet (119 m)	Brandywine Hundred	Wilmington	Wilmington	
Grace Lutheran Church Memorial Gardens	39°46′05″N 75°40′07″W	312 feet (95 m)	Mill Creek Hundred		Hockessin	
Gracelawn Memorial Park	39°42′02″N 75°34′04″W	80 feet (24 m)	New Castle Hundred			Minquadale
Green Hill Cemetery	39°34′23″N 75°36′00″W	9 feet (2.7 m)	Red Lion Hundred	Delaware City	Delaware City	
Green Hill Presbyterian Church Cemetery	39°45′49″N 75°35′00″W	231 feet (70 m)	Wilmington Hundred	Wilmington	Wilmington	
Gregg Plantation Burial Ground	39°47′51″N 75°35′48″W	298 feet (91 m)	Christiana Hundred	Wilmington	Wilmington	
Grubb Burying Ground	39°48′46″N 75°29′07″W	257 feet (78 m)	Brandywine Hundred	Arden	Arden	
Head of Christiana Presbyterian Church Cemetery Head of Christiana Presbyterian Church	39°41′31″N 75°47′11″W	197 feet (60 m)	White Clay Hundred	Newark	Newark	
Hickory Grove Cemetery	39°31′23″N 75°38′30″W	31 feet (9.4 m)	St Georges Hundred			Biddles Corner
Hockessin Friends Cemetery	39°47′37″N 75°41′28″W	385 feet (117 m)	Mill Creek Hundred		Hockessin	
Immanuel Episcopal Churchyard	39°39′36″N 75°33′40″W	13 feet (4.0 m)	New Castle Hundred	New Castle	New Castle	
Jewish Community Cemetery	39°46′54″N 75°32′29″W	312 feet (95 m)	Brandywine Hundred	Wilmington	Wilmington	
Jimmie Staats Farm Cemetery		13 feet (4.0 m)	Appoquinimink Hundred			Deakyneville
Kings Assembly of God Church Cemetery	39°43′41″N 75°37′58″W	80 feet (24 m)	Mill Creek Hundred			Marshallton
Lee-Haven United Methodist Church Cemetery, see Pinetree Cemetery						
Lees Chapel Cemetery, see Pinetree Cemetery						
Limestone Presbyterian Church Memorial Garden	39°44′01″N 75°40′15″W	125 feet (38 m)	Mill Creek Hundred	Wilmington	Wilmington	
Lombardy Cemetery	39°46′57″N 75°32′36″W	326 feet (99 m)	Brandywine Hundred	Wilmington	Wilmington	
Lower Brandywine Presbyterian Church Cemetery	39°48′18″N 75°36′44″W	371 feet (113 m)	Christiana Hundred	Wilmington	Wilmington	
Machzikey Hadas Cemetery	39°42′10″N 75°33′54″W	74 feet (23 m)	New Castle Hundred			Minquadale
Masonic Home of Delaware	39°45′33″N 75°36′47″W	205 feet (62 m)	Christiana Hundred			Anglesey
McDonough Cemetery	39°29′29″N 75°38′59″W	67.72 feet (20.64 m)	St Georges Hundred			McDonough
Mill Creek Friends Meetinghouse Cemetery	39°45′38″N 75°44′30″W	376 feet (115 m)	Mill Creek Hundred		North Star	
Mount Lebanon Methodist Episcopal Church Cemetery	39°47′55″N 75°34′04″W	344 feet (105 m)	Brandywine Hundred	Wilmington	Wilmington	
Mount Olive Cemetery	39°45′24″N 75°35′48″W	176 feet (54 m)	Christiana Hundred	Wilmington	Wilmington	
Mount Pisgah UAME Church Cemetery	39°32′21″N 75°43′41″W	71 feet (22 m)	St Georges Hundred			Summit Bridge
Mount Pleasant Friends Meetinghouse Cemetery	39°46′37″N 75°29′27″W	119 feet (36 m)	Brandywine Hundred	Bellefonte	Bellefonte	
Mount Pleasant United Methodist Church Cemetery (Christiana, DE)	39°40′08″N 75°39′33″W	85 feet (26 m)	Christiana Hundred	Christiana	Christiana	
Mount Salem Cemetery	39°45′52″N 75°34′30″W	230 feet (70 m)	Christiana Hundred	Wilmington	Wilmington	Highlands
Mount Zion Cemetery	39°45′18″N 75°35′32″W	147 feet (45 m)	Christiana Hundred	Wilmington	Wilmington	
Mount Zion UAME Church Cemetery	39°41′11″N 75°45′31″W	162 feet (49 m)	White Clay Creek Hundred	Newark	Newark	
Nemours Estate	39°46′36″N 75°33′29″W	338 feet (103 m)	Brandywine Hundred	Wilmington	Wilmington	contains 3 burials
New Castle County Cemetery at Farnhurst	39°41′37″N 75°34′41″W	46 feet (14 m)	New Castle Hundred	New Castle	New Castle	also known as the Potter's Field at Farnhurst
New Castle Presbyterian Church Cemetery	39°39′35″N 75°33′46″W	25 feet (7.6 m)	New Castle Hundred	New Castle	New Castle	
New Castle United Methodist Church Cemetery	39°39′41″N 75°33′59″W	16 feet (4.9 m)	New Castle Hundred	New Castle	New Castle	
Newark Union Church and Cemetery	39°47′10″N 75°30′48″W	263 feet (80 m)	Brandywine Hundred	Wilmington	Talleyville	
