= Turkey Run (Shellpot Creek tributary) =

Stream in Delaware, USA

Turkey Run Tributary to Shellpot Creek
- Location of Turkey Run mouth Turkey Run (Shellpot Creek tributary) (the United States)

Location
- Country: United States
- State: Delaware
- County: New Castle
- City: Bellefonte

Physical characteristics
- Source: Alapocas Run divide
  - location: Forest Hills Park, Delaware
  - coordinates: 39°47′18″N 075°32′02″W
  - elevation: 262 ft (80 m)
- Mouth: Shellpot Creek
  - location: Bellefonte, Delaware
  - coordinates: 39°46′05″N 075°31′09″W
  - elevation: 48 ft (15 m)
- Length: 1.67 mi (2.69 km)
- Basin size: 0.95 square miles (2.5 km^{2})
- Discharge
  - location: Shellpot Creek
  - average: 1.42 cu ft/s (0.040 m^{3}/s) at mouth with Shellpot Creek

Basin features
- Progression: south-southeast
- River system: Delaware River
- Tributaries
  - left: unnamed tributaries
  - right: unnamed tributaries
- Bridges: Simon Road, Bedford Boulevard, Weldin Road, I-95, Washington Street Ext

Turkey Run is a 1.67 mi (2.69 km) long 1st order tributary to Shellpot Creek in New Castle County, Delaware.

== Course ==
Turkey Run rises in Forest Hills Park, Delaware and then flows south-southeast to join Shellpot Creek at Bellefonte, Delaware.

== Watershed ==
Turkey Run drains 0.95 square miles (2.5 km^{2}) of area, receives about 47.2 in/year of precipitation, has a topographic wetness index of 495.08 and is about 20% forested.

== See also ==
- List of Delaware rivers
