= Matson Run =

Stream in Delaware, United States

Matson Run Tributary to Shellpot Creek
- Location of Matson Run mouth Matson Run (the United States)

Location
- Country: United States
- State: Delaware
- County: New Castle
- City: Bellefonte

Physical characteristics
- Source: Alapocas Run divide
  - location: Blue Ball, Delaware
  - coordinates: 39°47′04″N 075°32′23″W
  - elevation: 260 ft (79 m)
- Mouth: Shellpot Creek
  - location: Bellefonte, Delaware
  - coordinates: 39°45′42″N 075°31′04″W
  - elevation: 20 ft (6.1 m)
- Length: 2.25 mi (3.62 km)
- Basin size: 1.28 square miles (3.3 km^{2})
- Discharge
  - location: Shellpot Creek
  - average: 1.88 cu ft/s (0.053 m^{3}/s) at mouth with Shellpot Creek

Basin features
- Progression: generally southeast
- River system: Delaware River
- Tributaries
  - left: unnamed tributaries
  - right: unnamed tributaries
- Bridges: Foulk Road, Weldin Road, I-95, Miller Road, W Lea Boulevard (x2)

Matson Run is a 2.25 mi (3.62 km) long 1st order tributary to Shellpot Creek in New Castle County, Delaware. This is the only stream of this name in the United States.

== Variant names ==
According to the Geographic Names Information System, it has also been known historically as:

- Mattsons Run

== Course ==
Matson Run rises in Blue Ball, Delaware and then flows southeast to join Shellpot Creek at Bellefonte, Delaware.

== Watershed ==
Matson Run drains 1.28 square miles (3.3 km^{2}) of area, receives about 47.2 in/year of precipitation, has a topographic wetness index of 499.25, and is about 11% forested.

== See also ==
- List of Delaware rivers
