= Newark Union Church and Cemetery =

Cemetery in Brandywine Hundred, Delaware, US

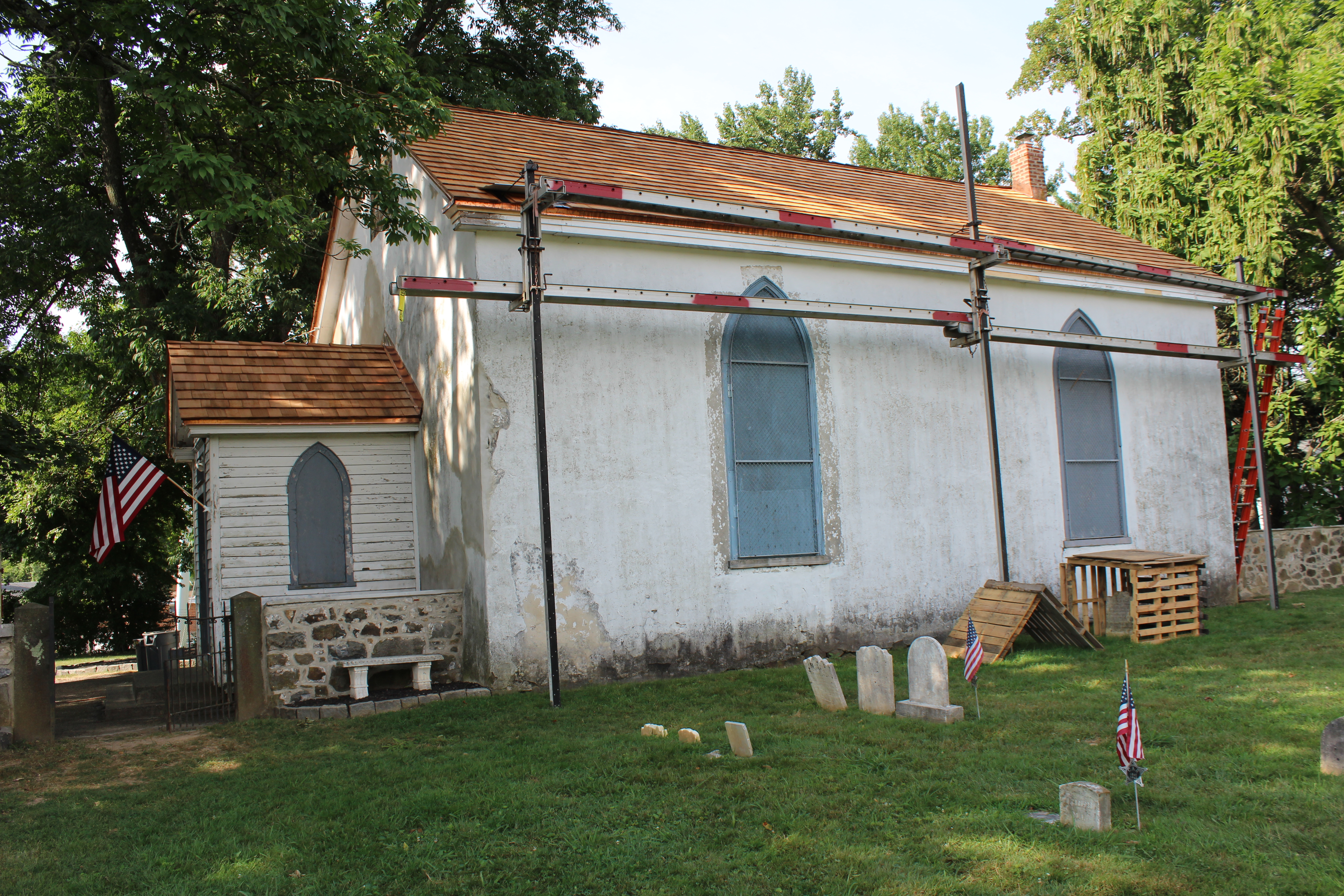
- Newark Union Church and Cemetery

Details
- Established: 1687
- Location: Brandywine Hundred, Delaware
- Country: United States
- Coordinates: 39.78641°N 75.51373°W
- Size: 4 acres
- No. of graves: 950
- Find a Grave: Newark Union Church and Cemetery

Newark Union Church and Cemetery is a historic meetinghouse and burial ground in Brandywine Hundred, Delaware near Carrcroft. Established in 1687, the cemetery is four acres in size and contains approximately 950 graves, including seven men who fought in the American Revolution and some early settlers of the Brandywine Hundred. The cemetery is located less than a mile from the Washington-Rochambeau Revolutionary Route through Delaware. The adjacent Newark Union Church started as a Quaker meetinghouse, but became a Methodist Episcopal church in 1845 and remained in use until 1970. Both the church and cemetery are listed on the National Register of Historic Places in 2020.

== History ==
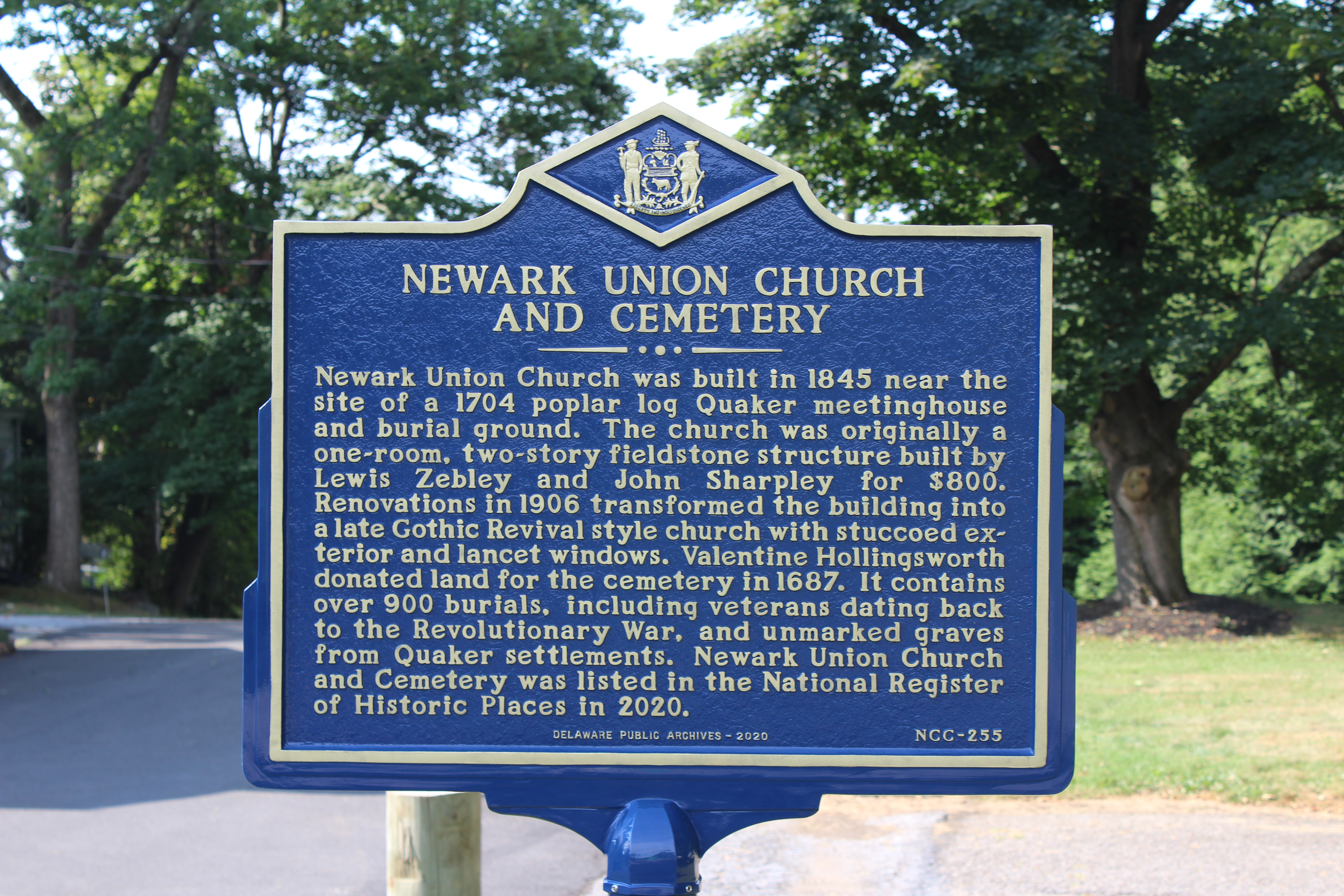
Newark Union Church and Cemetery Historical Plaque

In 1682, William Penn granted Valentine Hollingsworth 986 acres on Shellpot Creek. The tract extended north to what is now Shipley Road, south to near what became the Baltimore and Ohio Railroad, and west beyond what is now Concord Pike. Hollingsworth originally named the land "New Worke", a spelling which eventually evolved into "Newark" (not to be confused with the college town about 20 miles to the west and south). He and other Quaker settlers Morgan Druet and Cornelius Empson began to hold Friends meetings in their homes and were formally recognized in 1684 by the Quarterly Meeting in Philadelphia. In 1687, Hollingsworth donated land for a Quaker meetinghouse and burial ground. Soon after they erected a building made of poplar logs which lasted for about sixty years. Monthly meetings were held at Newark regularly until 1704, and then alternated with Centre until 1707. Members of Hollingsworth's family hosted the Quaker Meeting in their home adjacent to the burial ground until the death of Valentine's daughter Catherine and her husband George Robinson. When the Newark Meeting closed in 1754, the cemetery took the name "Newark Free Burial Ground".

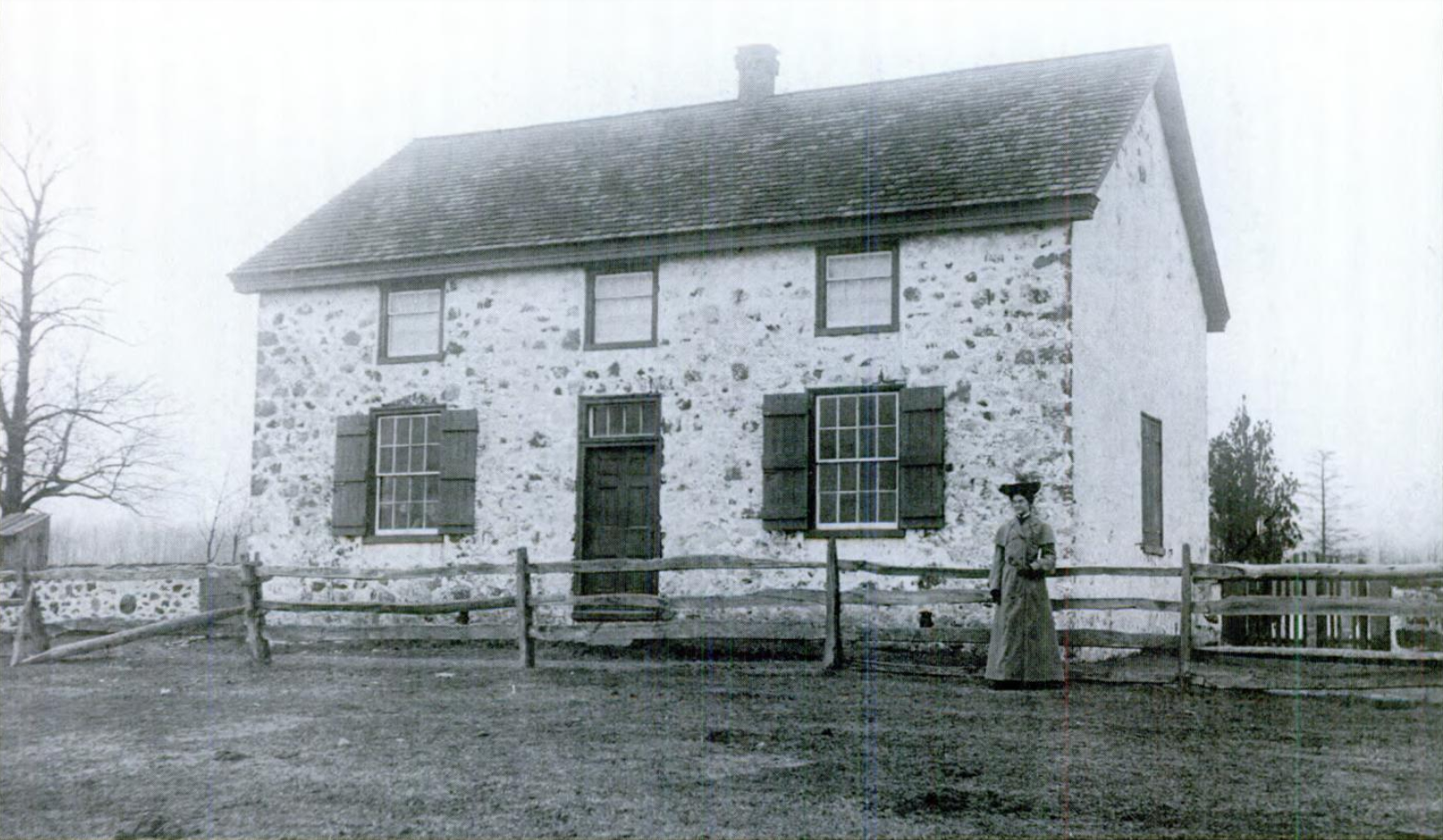
1890 view of Newark Union Church before renovation

After the American Revolutionary War, the property fell into neglect for more than half a century. Part of the wall surrounding the cemetery dates to 1787, when Charles Robinson, Valentine's great-grandson, carved his initials into one of the stones. In 1845, neighbors including George W. Weldin and his nephew Jacob R. Weldin raised money to complete the wall and erect a non-denominational church, called Newark Union Church. The one-room two-story fieldstone structure was built by Lewes Zebley and John Sharpley. In 1888, the church was adopted into the Methodist Episcopal Conference, and took the name Newark-Union M. E. Church. In 1906, the church was renovated to reflect a Gothic Revival architecture. In 1951, the congregation moved to Concord Pike and renamed itself Aldersgate United Methodist Church. The building was used by Shellburne Bible Church from 1957 until 1970 when they built a new brick structure.

The cemetery and now-vacant church are maintained by a voluntary, self-perpetuating board of trustees which allows burial for Brandywine Hundred residents. Significant restoration efforts were completed between 2021 and 2023, transforming the church into a public meeting space and museum.

== Notable burials ==
- Valentine Hollingsworth (1632–1710)

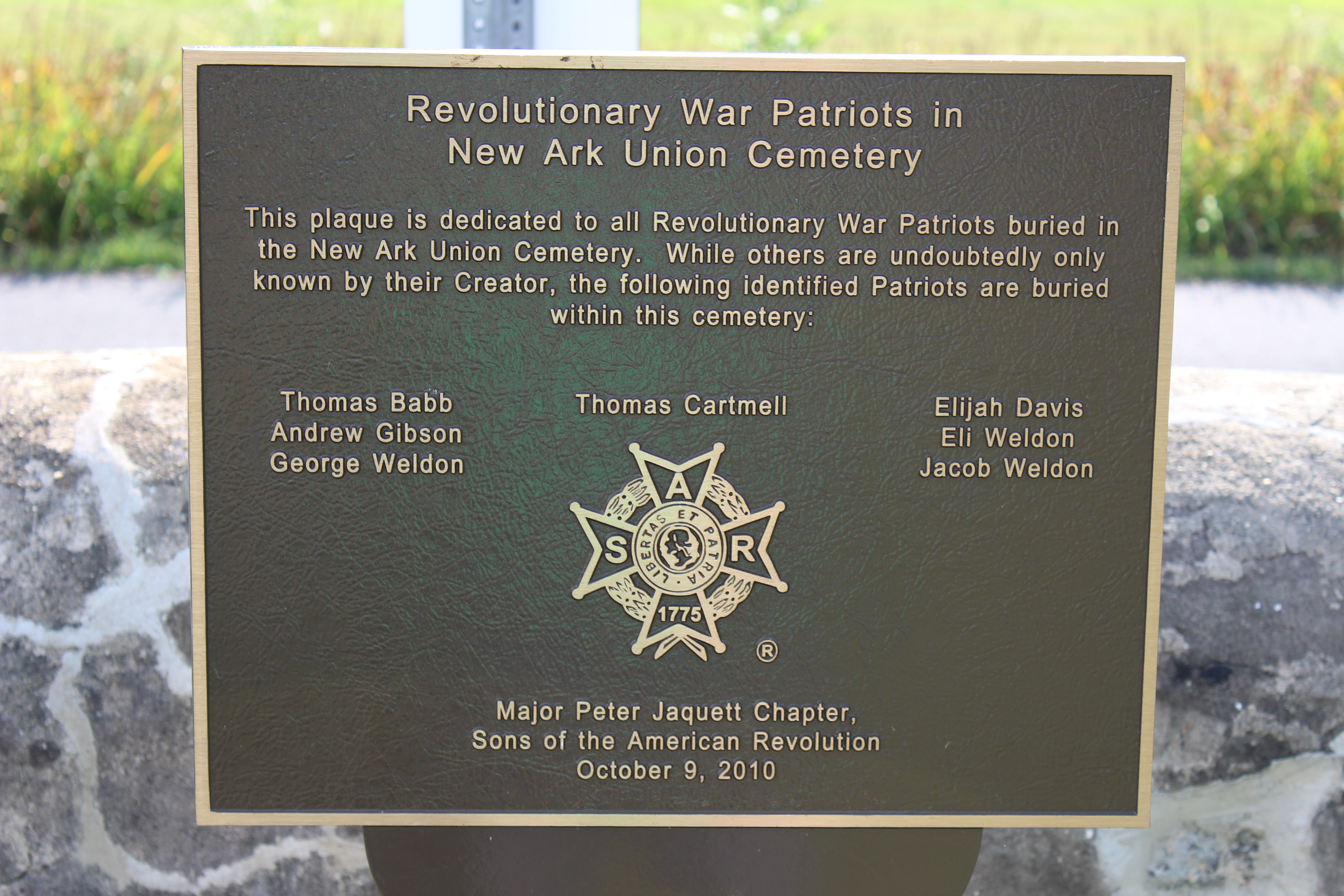
Historical plaque listing the seven identified men buried at Newark Union Cemetery who fought in the American Revolution

The cemetery contains the burials of seven men who fought in the American Revolutionary War.

- Thomas Babb
- Thomas Cartmell
- Elijah Davis
- Andrew Gibson
- Eli Weldin
- George Weldin
- Jacob Weldin

The cemetery also contains the burials of several early settlers of the Brandywine Hundred including:

- Edward, Henry and John Beeson
- William Forwood
- Richard G. Hanby
- John F. Sharpley
- William Talley
- Jacob R. Weldin
