= Mt. Airy School No. 27 =

- U.S. National Register of Historic Places
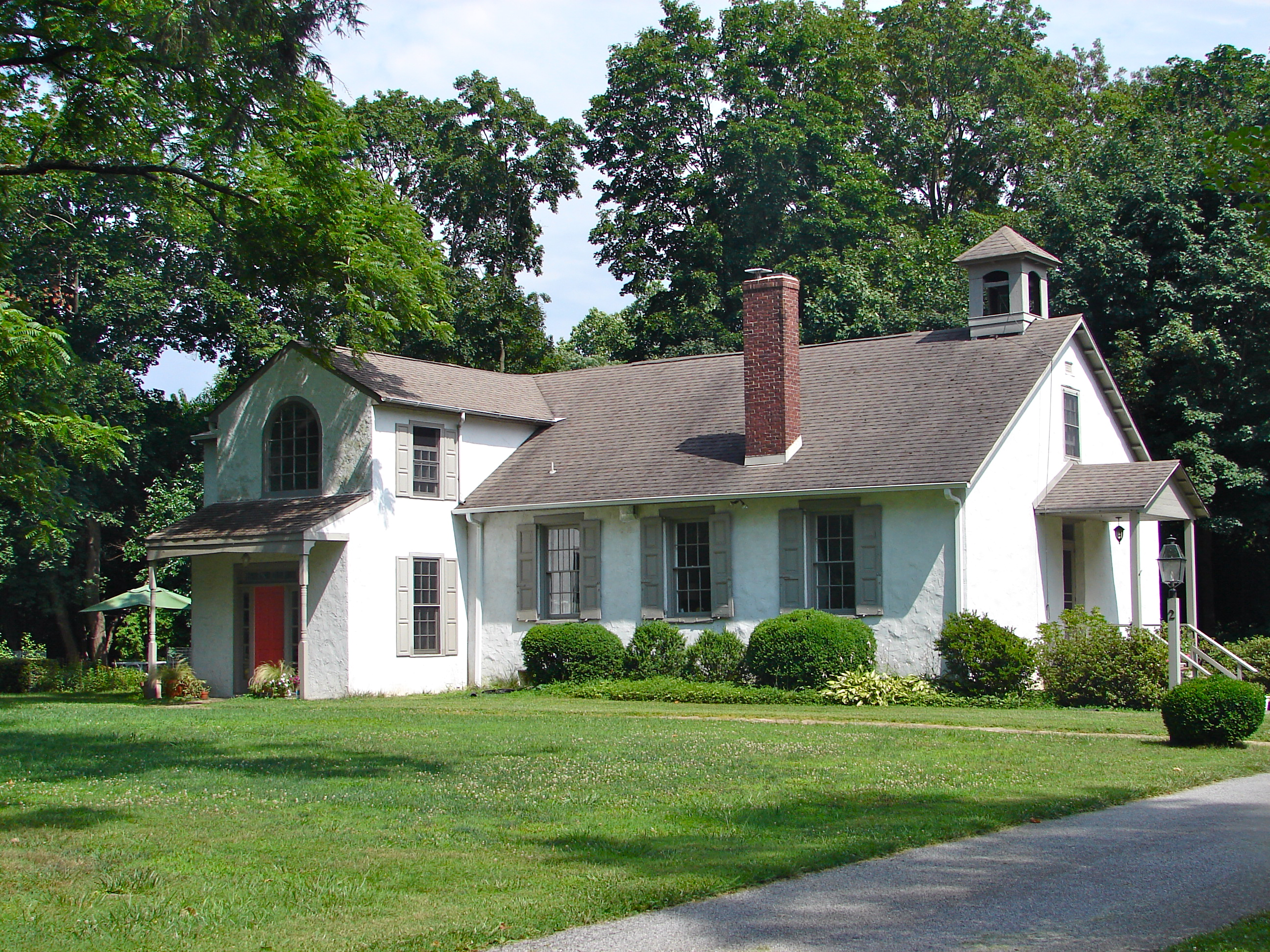
- Mt. Airy School No. 27, July 2011

- Location within Delaware Location within the United States
- Location: 2 Selborne Drive, Centreville, Delaware
- Coordinates: 39.82686°N 75.61936°W
- Area: less than one acre
- Built: 1863
- MPS: Centreville MRA
- NRHP reference No.: 83001400
- Added to NRHP: April 13, 1983

Mt. Airy No. 27 School is a historic one-room school built in 1863 in Centreville, New Castle County, Delaware. It was designed and built as a one-room, one-teacher school, and operated as such from 1863 to 1932. It is now used as a private residence.

A gable-roofed portico stands in front of the entrance, with a small bell tower or cupola on the main roof just above it. Three large six-over-six windows are on each side of the building.

In 1983, at the same time the school was listed the Centreville Historic District, the Joseph Chandler House, and Carpenter-Lippincott House, all located nearby, were also listed.
