= Joseph Chandler House =

Historic house in Delaware, United States

- U.S. National Register of Historic Places
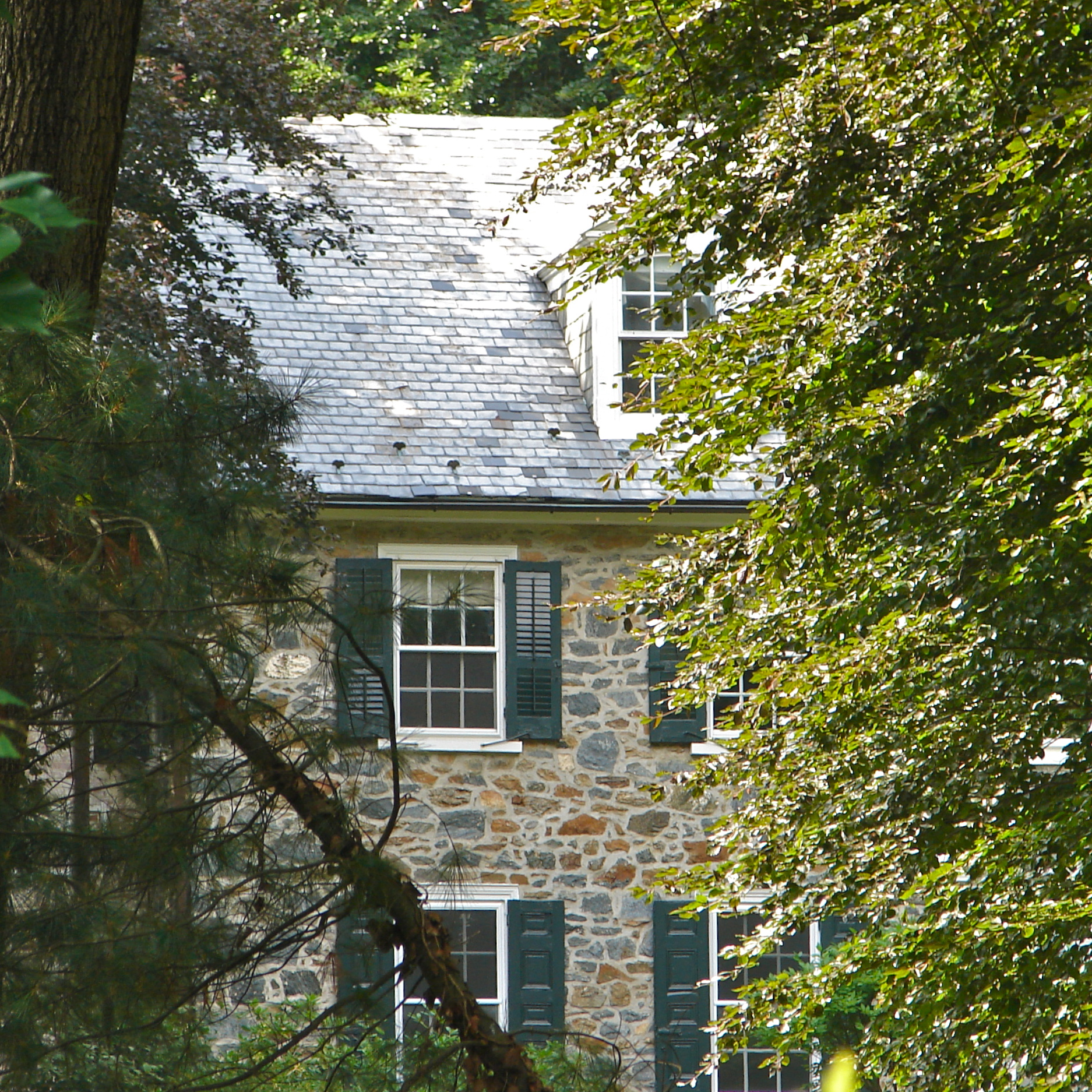
- main house

- Location within Delaware Location within the United States
- Location: 5826 Kennett Pike, Centreville, Delaware
- Coordinates: 39°49′26″N 75°37′9″W
- Area: 2.1 acres (0.85 ha)
- Built: 1800
- Architect: P.Ray Chandler & G.Noel Chandler
- Architectural style: Georgian
- MPS: Centreville MRA
- NRHP reference No.: 83001390
- Added to NRHP: April 13, 1983

The Joseph Chandler House, built c. 1800, is the oldest house in Centreville, New Castle County, Delaware. Centreville developed along the Kennett Pike (Delaware Route 52) starting about 1811, with its houses facing toward the pike. Nevertheless, the Chandler house faces south, away from the pike.

Dr. Joseph P. Chandler, who built the house, used it as a residence and an office. The house was later acquired by the Gregg, Carpenter and du Pont families. William S. Potter bought the house in 1935 and added brick and stone wings to the original stone house.

The house was listed by the National Register of Historic Places in 1983, at the same time the nearby Centreville Historic District, Mt. Airy School No. 27, and Carpenter-Lippincott House were also listed.
