= Senator Anthony (disambiguation) =

Henry B. Anthony (1815–1884) was a U.S. Senator from Rhode Island from 1859 to 1884. Senator Anthony may also refer to:

- Charles Anthony (politician) (1798–1862), Ohio State Senate
- Joseph Biles Anthony (1795–1851), Pennsylvania State Senate
- Sarah Anthony (born 1983), Michigan State Senate
