= Greenmeadows =

Greenmeadows may refer to:

== Places ==
=== New Zealand ===
- Greenmeadows, New Zealand, suburb of Napier, New Zealand

=== United States ===
- Green Meadows, Ohio
- Green Meadows, Maryland

== Miscellaneous ==
- Green Meadows Conference (OHSAA), an OHSAA athletic league based in northwest Ohio.

== See also ==
- Green Meadow (disambiguation)
