= Sheryl Sims =

American quilter

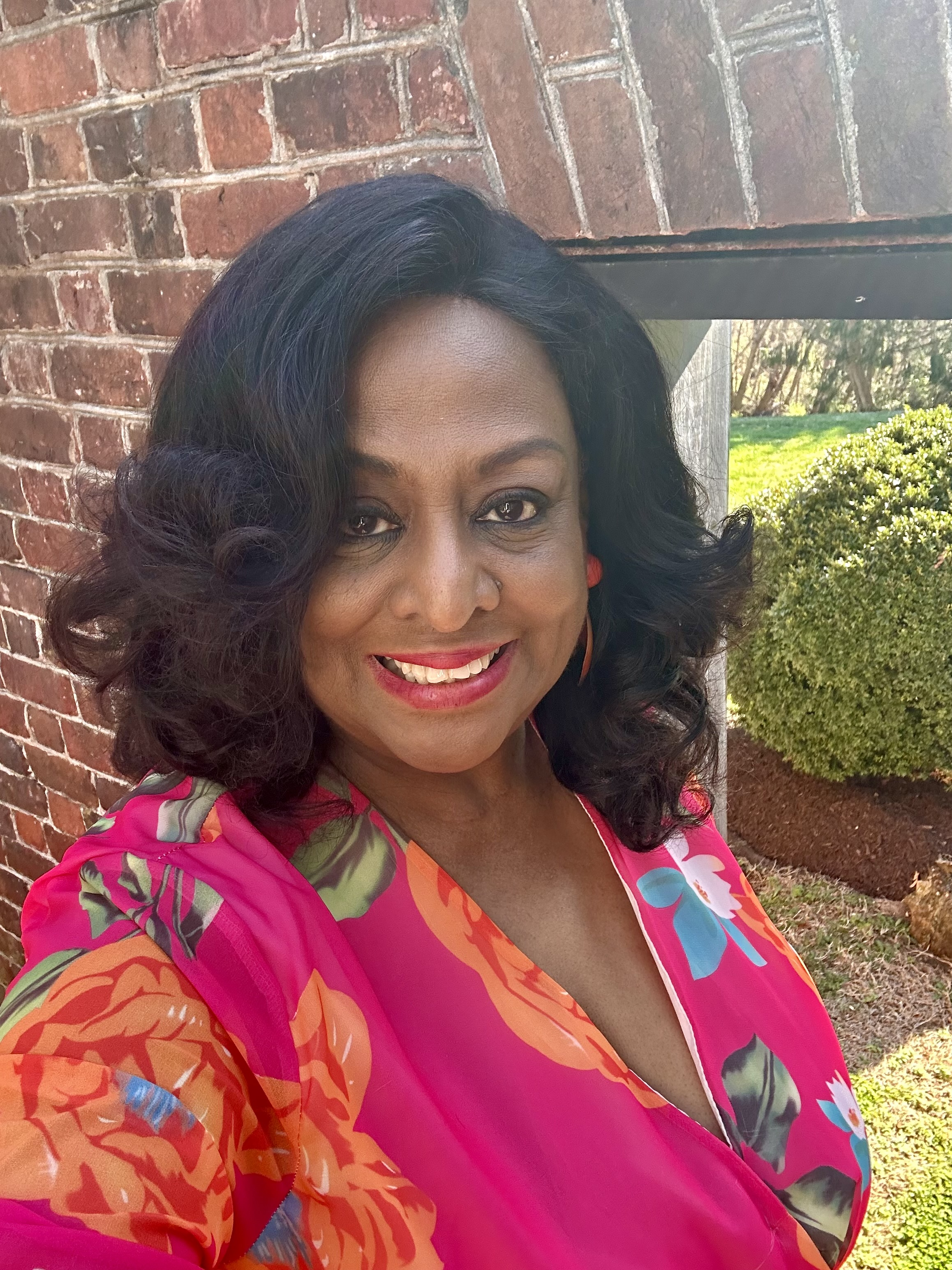
- Sims in 2025

Arts Commissioner for the City of Alexandria, Virginia
- Incumbent
- Assumed office 2022

Personal details
- Born: Germany
- Education: University of Houston
- Occupation: quilter, historian, genealogist

Sheryl E. Sims is a German-born American quilter. She was appointed as the Commissioner for the Arts of Alexandria, Virginia in 2022.

== Early life and family ==
Sims was born in Germany, where her father was stationed as an officer in the United States Army. She spent part of her childhood in Thailand. Sims is the sixth-great-granddaughter of Andrew Cox, an American patriot. She is also the fourth-great-granddaughter of Calvin Leary, a Louisiana planter, and a woman named Mariah, who was enslaved on his estate, Sunnsyside Plantation. Sims is a 10th-great-granddaughter of the Irish Quaker colonist Valentine Hollingsworth, who was one of the signatories of William Penn's Great Charter.

She was presented as a debutante in her youth. She graduated with a degree in environmental design from the University of Houston.

Sims has three brothers and a sister. She is divorced and is the mother of an adult daughter, Amber Wihshi, who is a resident of Alexandria, Virginia.

== Career ==
Sims is a professional quilter. In November 2023, she gave a presentation on her work at her exhibit, titled Ancestry Through Art: Discoveries Revealed in Story Quilts Inspired by Family and Faith at Pope–Leighey House on Woodlawn Plantation in Alexandria, Virginia. Sims' art focuses on her family history, both enslaver and enslaved. She was appointed as Commissioner for the Arts in Alexandria from 2022 to 2024. She serves on the advisory committee for the Virginia Quilt Museum.

She also works as a legal secretary in Washington, D.C.

== Personal life ==
Sims joined the Nelly Custis Chapter of the Daughters of the American Revolution in 2022. She was the first person of color to be admitted as a member in her chapter. In November 2022, she received the Community Service Award and the Women in the Arts Award from her chapter. She is also a member of the Southern Dames of America, the Descendants of Valentine Hollingsworth Sr. Society, the National Society of American Textile Workers, and the Hereditary Society of Teachers.
