= William Medill =

22nd Governor of Ohio

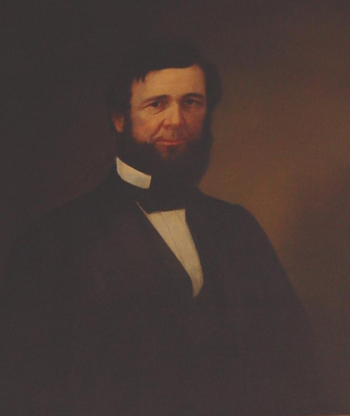
- Portrait by John Henry Witt

22nd Governor of Ohio
- In office July 13, 1853 – January 14, 1856
- Lieutenant: James Myers
- Preceded by: Reuben Wood
- Succeeded by: Salmon P. Chase

1st Lieutenant Governor of Ohio
- In office January 12, 1852 – July 13, 1853
- Governor: Reuben Wood
- Preceded by: Position established
- Succeeded by: James Myers

4th Commissioner of Indian Affairs
- In office 1845–1849
- Appointed by: James K. Polk
- Preceded by: Thomas Hartley Crawford
- Succeeded by: Orlando Brown

Member of the U.S. House of Representatives from Ohio's 9th district
- In office March 4, 1839 – March 3, 1843
- Preceded by: John Chaney
- Succeeded by: Elias Florence

Speaker of the Ohio House of Representatives
- In office December 5, 1836 – December 3, 1837
- Preceded by: William Sawyer
- Succeeded by: Charles Anthony

Member of the Ohio House of Representatives
- In office 1835–1838

Personal details
- Born: William Medill; February 1802 White Clay Hundred, New Castle County, Delaware, U.S.
- Died: September 2, 1865 (aged 63) Lancaster, Ohio, U.S.
- Resting place: Elmwood Cemetery
- Party: Democratic
- Education: Newark Academy

William Medill (February 1802 – September 2, 1865) was a 19th-century American lawyer and Democratic politician from Ohio. He was the 22nd governor of Ohio from 1853 to 1856. He had previously served two terms in the U.S. House of Representatives from 1839 to 1843.

== Biography ==
Born in White Clay Hundred, New Castle County, Delaware, William was the son of Irish immigrants, William and Isabelle Medill. He grew up on the family farm, in the rural outskirts of Newark. He attended the Newark Academy and graduated in 1825. After graduation, he read law and was admitted to the bar in Delaware in 1830. Medill moved to Ohio in 1830 and was admitted to the bar in Ohio in 1832.

== Career ==
Medill was elected to the Ohio House of Representatives, where he served from 1835 to 1838, serving as speaker of the House from 1836 to 1837. He was elected to the United States House of Representatives in 1838, serving from 1839 to 1843. He lost a bid for a third term in 1842. After briefly serving as the second assistant postmaster general, Medill was appointed by President Polk as commissioner of Indian Affairs. He returned to Ohio in 1850 to serve as the president of the 1850–1851 Constitutional Convention. Elected to the new post of lieutenant governor of Ohio in 1851, Medill entered office in 1852, serving until the resignation of Governor Reuben Wood on July 13, 1853 to take up a Consular office in Chile. Medill was re-elected in his own right in 1853, but was defeated in a bid for a second full term in 1855 by the anti-slavery Salmon P. Chase. He was First Comptroller of the United States Treasury from 1857 to 1861.

== Death ==
Medill died in Lancaster in 1865, and was interred in Elmwood Cemetery in Lancaster, Ohio. Medill never married. A nephew inherited his property.

== Notes ==
Political offices
Preceded by None	Lieutenant Governor of Ohio; 1852–1853	Succeeded by James Myers
Preceded by Reuben Wood	Governor of Ohio; 1853–1856	Succeeded by Salmon P. Chase
Preceded by Elisha Whittlesey	First Comptroller of the United States Treasury; 1857–1861	Succeeded by Elisha Whittlesey
Preceded by Thomas Hartley Crawford	Commissioner of Indian Affairs; 1845–1850	Succeeded by Orlando Brown
Ohio House of Representatives
Preceded by Joseph Stuckey; John McCreed	Representative from Fairfield County; December 7, 1835 – December 2, 1838; Served alongside: John McCreed; John Graybill	Succeeded by John Brough
Preceded by William Sawyer	Speaker of the House; 1836–1837	Succeeded by Charles Anthony
U.S. House of Representatives
Preceded by John Chaney	United States Representative from Ohio's 9th congressional district 1839–1843	Succeeded by Elias Florence
Party political offices
Preceded by Reuben Wood	Democratic Party nominee for Governor of Ohio; 1853, 1855	Succeeded by Henry B. Payne
