= Green Meadow =

Green Meadow may refer to:

- "The Green Meadow", a short story by H. P. Lovecraft and Winifred V. Jackson

== Towns ==
- Green Meadow, Delaware, US
- Green Meadow, Florida, US
- Green Meadow Township, Minnesota, US

== Structures ==
- Green Meadow Waldorf School, Chestnut Ridge, New York, US
- Green Meadow (Odessa, Delaware), US, a historic house
