= Green Acres, Delaware =

Unincorporated community in Delaware, United States

- Unincorporated community
- Location within Delaware Location within the United States
- Coordinates: 39°47′25″N 75°29′49″W
- Country: United States
- State: Delaware
- County: New Castle
- Elevation: 230 ft (70 m)
- Time zone: UTC-5 (Eastern (EST))
  - Summer (DST): UTC-4 (EDT)
- Area code: 302
- GNIS feature ID: 216843

Green Acres is a suburban community in New Castle County, Delaware, United States.

== Geography ==
Green Acres is located 4.5 miles north of the city of Wilmington and several miles from the Pennsylvania state line. I-95 runs along its southeastern border. Green Acres has two entrances, both of which connect to Silverside Road that runs along the northeastern border of the community, and across from which is the neighborhood of Windybush. Stoney Creek runs along its western side and creates its border with Carrcroft.

== History ==
Green Acres was established in 1955 by Franklin Builders on land previously owned by Patricia Monagham. The company had penchant for use 'green' in naming its projects: Green Acres, Green Meadow, Radnor Green, Green Tree and Nottingham Green.

Green Acres was designed for middle-class families. Its homes were built among tall trees, rather than completely cleared land as was common at the time. Shaded sidewalks were built along each street to provide a safe area for children and strollers. The neighborhood took four years to complete, totaling 376 homes. It is noted for what at the time was its modern split-level architecture, reminiscent of Frank Lloyd Wright.

Streets were laid out and named in alphabetical order after American colleges: Athens, Bucknell, Carson, Drake, Emory, Fresno, and Grinnell roads run parallel to Silverside Road. Newcomb, Oberlin, Quincy, Radford, Stanford, and Tulane roads all run perpendicular to Silverside Road.

== Notable people ==
- J. Caleb Boggs, US Senator from 1961 to 1973.
- Erik Kissa, scientist and author.
- Lynn Troy Maniscalco, photographer.
