= Centreville Layton School =

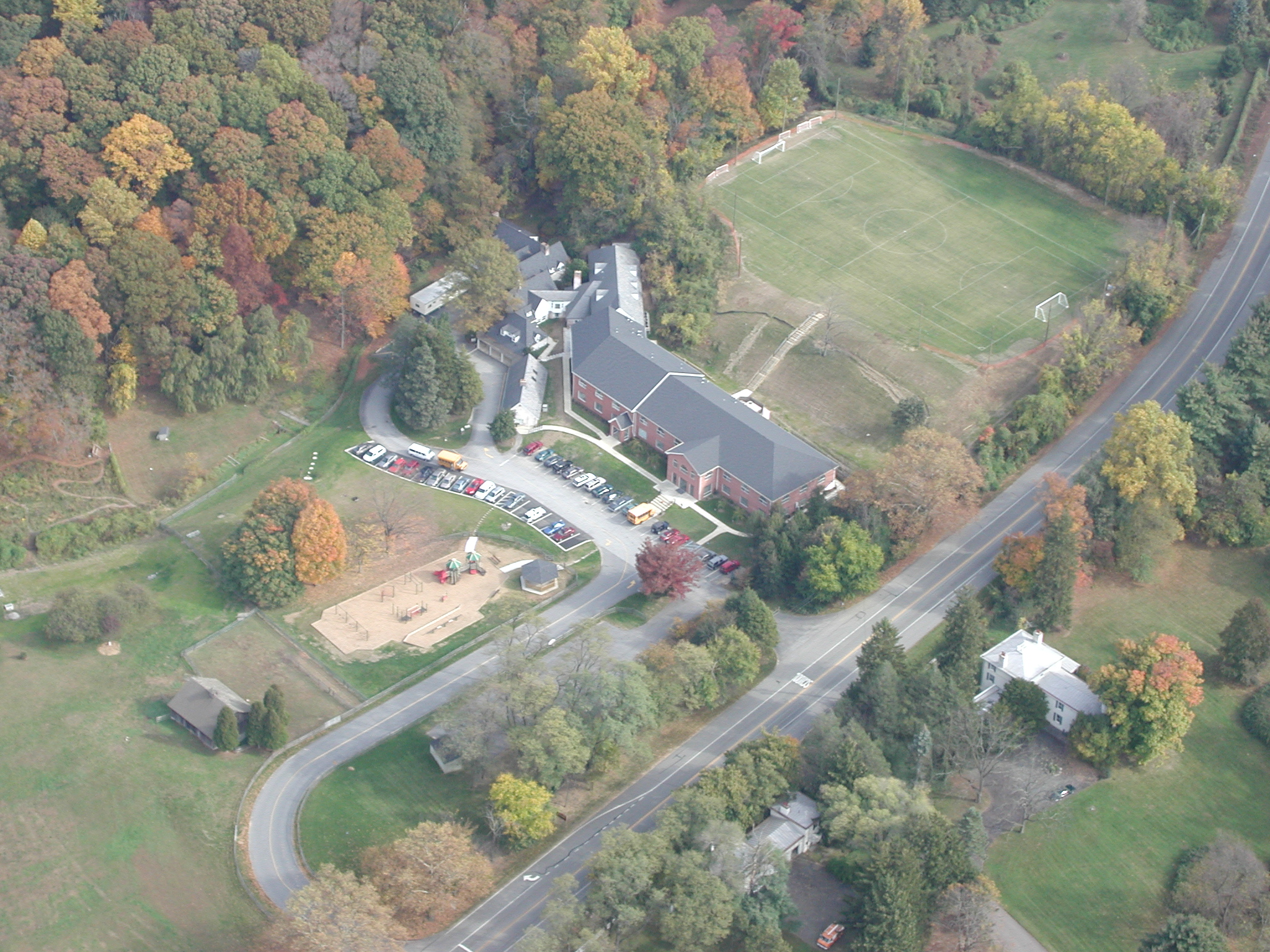

Location
- 6201 Kennett Pike; Centreville, Delaware 19807; United States; 39°49′48″N 75°37′26″W

Information
- Established: 1974 (52 years ago)
- CEEB code: 080122
- Head teacher: Richard Taubar
- Faculty: 38
- Grades: Early K-12
- Enrollment: 109 (2022)
- Colors: Silver and blue
- Mascot: Gryphon
- Tuition: Early K-12 Grade $32,750, 9th-12th Grade: $36,000
- Website: centrevillelayton.org

Centreville Layton School is an American private school for children with diverse learning styles in Delaware. The program identifies academic and social needs of the individual and provides a curriculum that focuses on problem solving and critical thinking.

== History ==
Centreville Layton School is the result of the 2014 merger between Centreville School and Layton Preparatory School. Dr. Barton Reese was the first Head of School after the merger and served as Head until September 2022.

== Accreditations ==
- Middle States Association of Colleges and Schools
- Delaware Department of Education
