= Carrcroft, Delaware =

Unincorporated community in Delaware, United States

- Unincorporated community
- Location within Delaware Location within the United States
- Coordinates: 39°47′15″N 75°30′22″W
- Country: United States
- State: Delaware
- County: New Castle
- Elevation: 256 ft (78 m)
- Time zone: UTC-5 (Eastern (EST))
  - Summer (DST): UTC-4 (EDT)
- Area code: 302
- GNIS feature ID: 213762

Carrcroft is an unincorporated community in New Castle County, Delaware, United States. Carrcroft is located along Delaware Route 3, north of the interchange with Interstate 95 to the northeast of Wilmington. Stoney Creek runs along its eastern edge and creates its border with Green Acres.

== History ==
Carrcroft was once known as New Ark Union. The Newark Union Church and Cemetery are nearby.

Carrcroft's population was 25 in 1890. and was 87 in 1960.
