= Valentine Hollingsworth =

Irish Quaker settler (1632–1710)

- Born: August 15, 1632; County Armagh, Ireland
- Died: October 13, 1710 (aged 78)
- Resting place: Newark Union Cemetery, Brandywine Hundred, Delaware, U.S.
- Occupations: Delaware Colony settler, politician

Valentine Hollingsworth (August 15, 1632 – October 13, 1710) was an Irish Quaker settler of Brandywine Hundred in the Delaware Colony in the late 17th century.

Hollingsworth was born to Henry and Catherine Hollingsworth in County Armagh, Ireland. The family had moved from Northern Cheshire, England. He first married in 1655 to Anne Rea (1628-1671), by whom he had four children, then in 1672 to Anne Calvert, by whom he had four more children.

Hollingsworth was converted to Quakerism by George Fox while in Ireland and suffered religious persecution. He stopped attending religious services at the Church of Ireland and was fined and had his supply of grain confiscated. In 1682 he and his family sailed for the Delaware Colony from Belfast, on the ship Antelope. William Penn granted him 986 acres of land between Shellpot Creek to Blue Ball, Delaware in what is now Wilmington, Delaware. The Quaker settlers rotated religious services between their houses until Hollingsworth donated land for the creation of a meetinghouse and burial ground.

Hollingsworth was a member of the First Assembly of the Province of Pennsylvania. He served as a justice of the peace. He was one of the signers of William Penn's Great Charter.

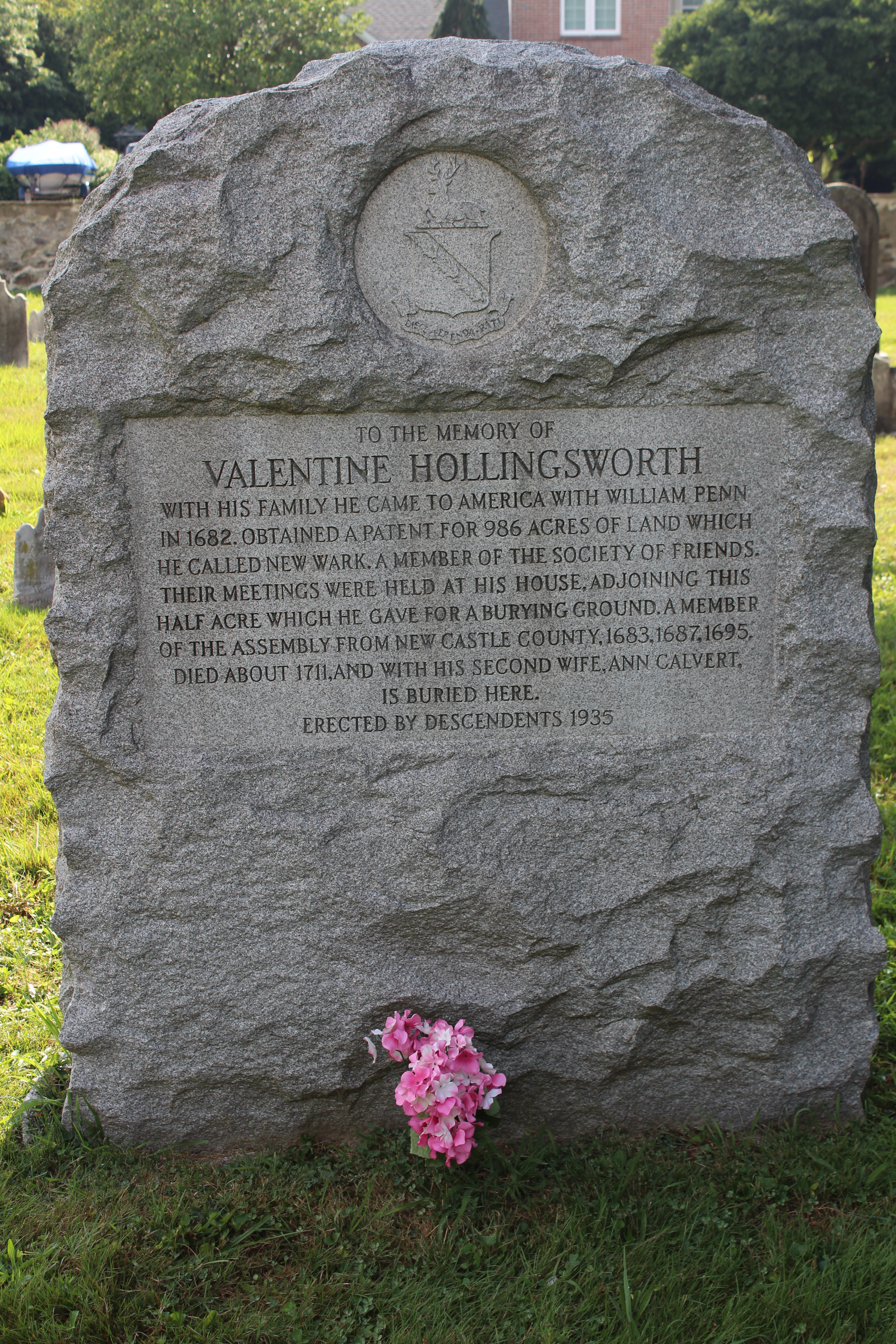
Hollingsworth Memorial at Newark Union Cemetery

He died on October 13, 1710, and was interred at Newark Union Cemetery. A large monument marks the site of his burial.

Coat of Arms of Valentine Hollingsworth

== Sources ==
- Myers, Albert Cook (1902). Immigration of the Irish Quakers into Pennsylvania 1682-1750 With Their Early History in Ireland. The New Era Printing Company.
- Stewart, Joseph Adger (1925). Descendants of Valentine Hollingsworth, Sr. John P. Morton & Company. ISBN 9780608319681.
