= Centreville Historic District (Centreville, Delaware) =

Historic district in Delaware, United States

- U.S. National Register of Historic Places
- U.S. Historic district
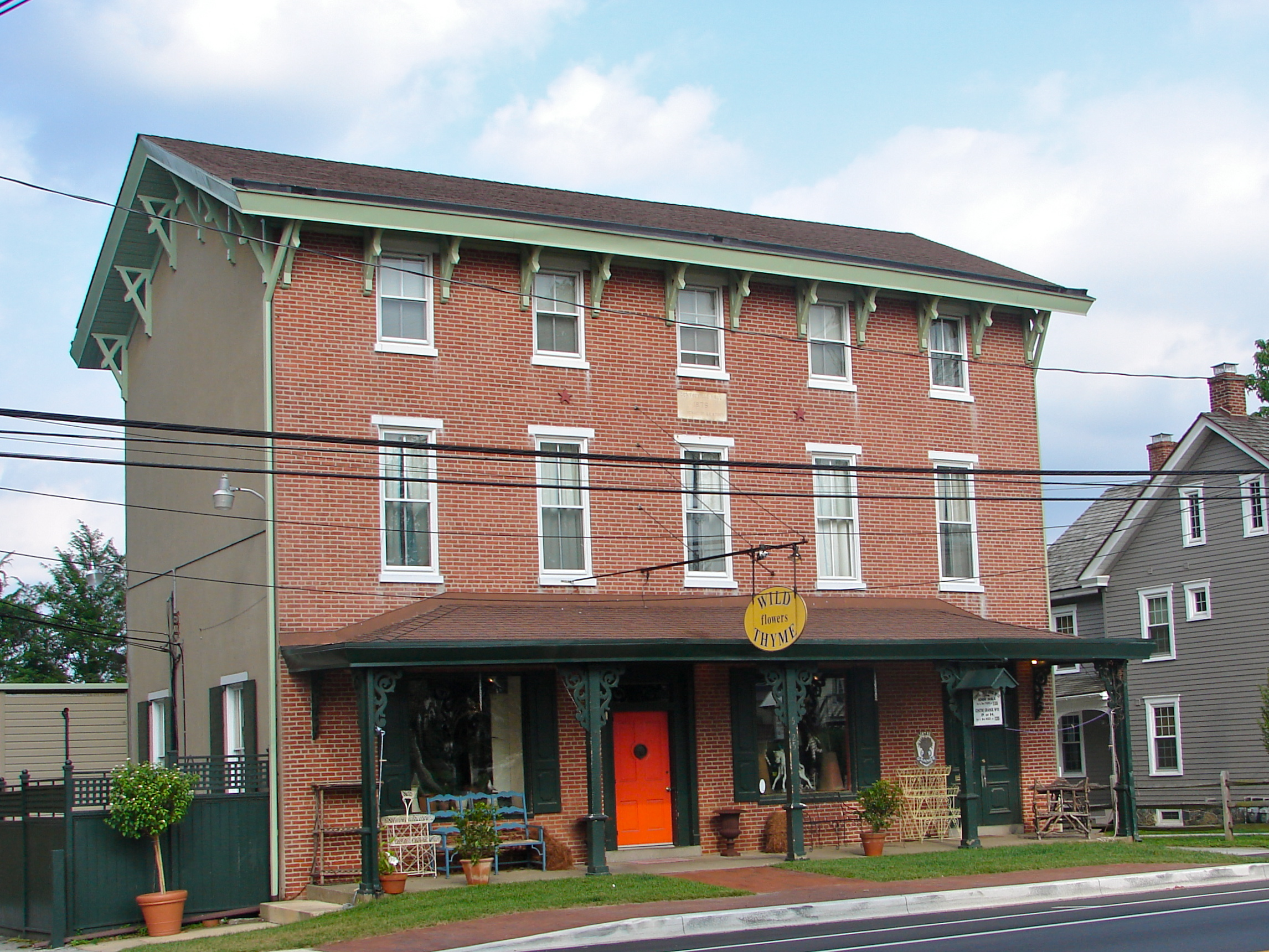
- Odd Fellows Hall, June 2011

- Location within Delaware Location within the United States
- Location: Kenneth Pike and Owls Nest/Twaddell Mill Rd., Centreville, Delaware
- Coordinates: 39°49′16″N 75°37′00″W
- Area: 15.5 acres (6.3 ha)
- Architectural style: Mixed (more Than 2 Styles From Different Periods)
- MPS: Centreville MRA
- NRHP reference No.: 83001338
- Added to NRHP: April 13, 1983

Centreville Historic District is a national historic district located at Centreville, New Castle County, Delaware. It encompasses 15 contributing buildings and were built between 1820 and 1920. It is primarily a residential district. Notable buildings include the Dr. Joseph H. Chandler House, Chandler-Dixon House, Nichols House, the M. J. Furey House, the R. T. Carey House, the Rev. D. W. Moore House, the Mrs. R. Todd House, and the Odd Fellows Hall.

It was listed on the National Register of Historic Places in 1983.
