= Wilmington Hundred =

Unincorporated subdivision of New Castle County, Delaware

Wilmington Hundred is an unincorporated subdivision of New Castle County, Delaware. Hundreds were once used as a basis for representation in the Delaware General Assembly, and while their names still appear on all real estate transactions, they presently have no meaningful use or purpose except as a geographical point of reference.

== Boundaries and formation ==
Wilmington Hundred is that portion of New Castle County that surrounds the confluence of the Christiana River, and Brandywine Creek, where they enter the Delaware River, and is one and the same as the municipal corporation of the city of Wilmington. It was formed from Christiana Hundred, Brandywine Hundred and New Castle Hundred in 1855 and was named for the city of Wilmington, under which name the entire area is incorporated.

== Development ==
Wilmington Hundred has been a fully urbanized area since the late 19th century, including residential, commercial, and industrial areas.

== Geography ==
The important geographical features are the Christiana River, Brandywine Creek, and the Delaware River, which forms its eastern boundary. It is in the Piedmont and Atlantic Coastal Plain regions with several low hills overlooking the Delaware River. The Fall Line cuts through the hundred.

== Transportation ==
Important roads include portions of Interstate 95, Interstate 495, U.S. Route 202, Market Street (U.S. Route 13), which is the old main highway between Philadelphia, Wilmington and Dover, Concord Avenue (Delaware Route 202), and the old main highway between Wilmington and Baltimore, now Maryland Avenue (Delaware Route 4). A portion of the Philadelphia, Wilmington and Baltimore Railroad, subsequently the main north–south line of the Pennsylvania Railroad, now Amtrak's Northeast Corridor, and a portion of the old Baltimore and Ohio Railroad, now CSX Transportation's Philadelphia Subdivision, both cross through Wilmington.
