= Charles Anthony (politician) =

American politician

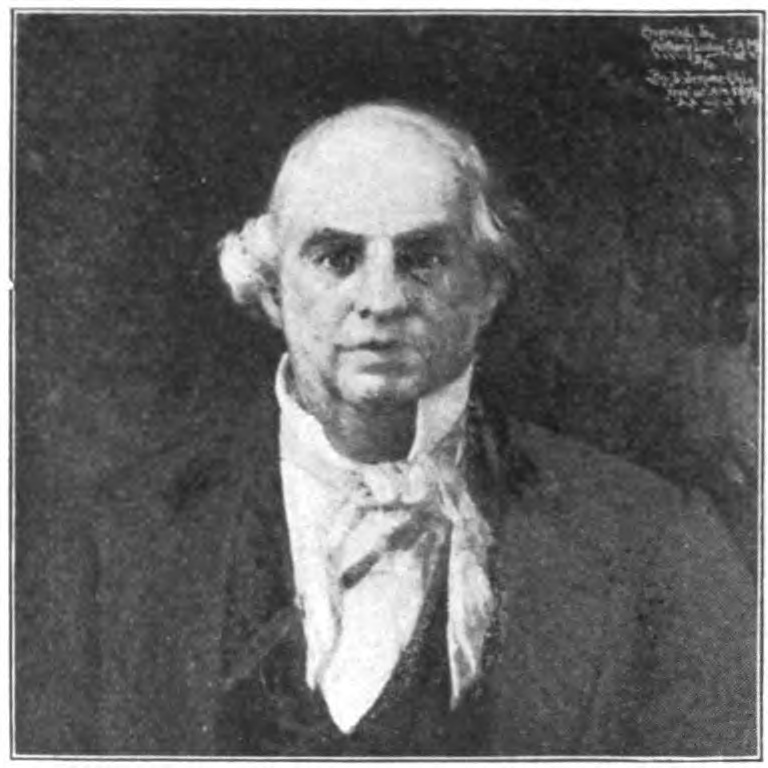

Speaker of the Ohio House of Representatives
- In office December 4, 1837 – December 2, 1838
- Preceded by: William Medill
- Succeeded by: James J. Faran

Personal details
- Born: March 31, 1798 Richmond, Virginia, United States
- Died: May 10, 1862 (aged 64) Springfield, Ohio, United States
- Resting place: Columbia Street Cemetery
- Party: Whig
- Spouses: Elizabeth Evans; Mary E. Hulsey
- Children: sixteen

Military service
- Allegiance: United States
- Branch/service: Ohio Militia
- Years of service: 1825–1847
- Rank: Brigadier General
- Unit: 3rd Brigade, 5th Division
- Battles/wars: Mexican–American War

Charles Anthony (1798–1862) was a legislative leader in the U.S. State of Ohio. He was also a Militia General during the Mexican–American War, a Masonic Grand Master for his state, and a U.S. Attorney.

== Legislative activities ==
Charles Anthony was born in Richmond, Virginia, the son of Joseph and Rhoda Anthony on March 31, 1798. The family moved to a Clinton County, Ohio, farm in 1811. He went to Cincinnati to study law, and was admitted to the bar in 1820. He moved to Springfield in 1824, and lived there until his death.

Anthony was elected to the Ohio House of Representatives in 1829 for the 28th General Assembly, and re-elected to the 29th, and served 1829–1831. In 1833, he was elected to a two-year term in the Ohio State Senate, serving in the 32nd and 33rd General Assemblies, 1833–1835. When Speaker of the Senate Peter Hitchcock resigned March 6, 1835, Anthony was elected to fill the position. He returned to the House for the 36th General Assembly, 1837–1838. He was elected Speaker of the House for that session.

While he was Speaker, acts abolishing debtors' prison, establishing the Superior Court of Cincinnati, erecting Erie County, and establishing several railroad companies were passed. A joint resolution, protesting the annexation of Texas, was also adopted.

In the 1840 presidential campaign of William Henry Harrison, "he acquired a great reputation as a stump speaker." He was subsequently named United States Attorney for the District of Ohio during the Whig administrations of Harrison and Tyler.

He was bluff and outstanding as a jury lawyer. He was a man of integrity and force of character, and was popular with all classes.

— Benjamin F. Prince.

== Military activities ==
Anthony was an officer of Clark County companies of the Ohio Militia from 1825 to 1847. He was Brigadier General of the 3rd Brigade, 5th Division Ohio Militia during the Mexican–American War of 1846–1848.

== Masonic activities ==
Anthony received his Entered Apprentice degree in Highland Lodge #38 on March 24, 1822. On June 24, 1822, he received his Fellow Craft and Master Mason degrees. He was elected Grand Master of the Grand Lodge of Ohio in January, 1832, though he apparently was not even present or actively affiliated with any Ohio lodge.

In 1847, Anthony and several other brethren petitioned the Grand Lodge to establish Clark Lodge #101. The charter was granted in 1848, and Anthony was Master of the lodge 1848, 1849 and 1855.

== Personal ==
On March 23, 1820, Charles Anthony married Elizabeth Evans of Cincinnati, who had nine children and died in 1839. He married Mary E. Hulsey of Springfield, who had seven children, and survived her husband. He died May 10, 1862, in Springfield, and was buried in Columbia Street Cemetery, in an unmarked grave. The Ninth Masonic District later placed a marker on the family plot.

== Notes ==
Ohio Senate
Preceded by A. R. Colwell	Senator from Clark & Champaign Counties; December 2, 1833 – December 6, 1835	Succeeded by John H. James
Preceded by Peter Hitchcock	Speaker of the Senate; March 6, 1835 – June 7, 1835	Succeeded by David T. Disney
Ohio House of Representatives
Preceded by James Foley	Representative from Clark County; December 7, 1829 – December 4, 1831	Succeeded by Ira Paige
Preceded by W. V. H. Cushing	Representative from Clark County; December 4, 1837 – December 2, 1838	Succeeded by Alex Waddle
