= St. George's Hundred, Delaware =

Unincorporated subdivision of New Castle County, Delaware

St. Georges Hundred is an unincorporated subdivision of New Castle County, Delaware. Hundreds were once used as a basis for representation in the Delaware General Assembly, and while their names still appear on all real estate transactions, they presently have no meaningful use or purpose except as a geographical point of reference.

== Boundaries and formation ==
St. Georges Hundred is that portion of New Castle County that lies south of the Chesapeake and Delaware Canal and the small remaining portion of St. Georges Creek, and north of Appoquinimink Creek, extended generally westward from its headwaters to the Maryland state line, excepting a small area south of the Chesapeake and Delaware Canal, west of Summit Bridge and north of Back Creek. It was one of the original hundreds in Delaware created in 1682 and was named for St. Georges Creek that once flowed along its northern boundary. Today most of the bed of St. Georges Creek has been used by the route of the Chesapeake and Delaware Canal, which has effectively replaced it.

Originally, the default boundary of Delaware and Maryland was the vague height of land between the Delaware River and Chesapeake Bay drainage basins and St. Georges Hundred extended only to that point. With the running of the Mason–Dixon line in 1767, the western boundary of Delaware was established in its present location and became a portion of St. Georges Hundred's western boundary. The towns of Middletown and Odessa and the community of Port Penn are in St. Georges Hundred.

== Development ==
St. Georges Hundred is rural and agricultural in places, but there has been considerable residential and commercial development in the 1980s and 1990s which continues to this day. This area is among the fastest growing parts of Delaware.

== Geography ==
Important geographical features, in addition to the Chesapeake and Delaware Canal, St. Georges Creek and Appoquinimink Creek, include the Delaware River, which forms its eastern boundary, St. Augustine Creek, Scotts Run, Drawyers Creek, Back Creek, and Reedy Island in the Delaware River. It is entirely in the coastal plain region on the Delmarva Peninsula.

== Transportation ==
Important roads include portions of the Korean War Veterans Memorial Highway (Delaware Route 1), the DuPont Highway (U.S. Route 13), Levels Road, U.S. Route 301, Summit Bridge Road and Boyd's Corner Road (Delaware Route 896), Augustine Beach Road and Taylor's Bridge Road (Delaware Route 9). A portion of the old Delaware Railroad, subsequently the Delmarva branch of the Pennsylvania Railroad, now the Delmarva Central Railroad's Delmarva Subdivision, runs north–south through Middletown.
