= Alapocas Run =

Stream in Delaware, USA

Alapocas Run Tributary to Brandywine Creek
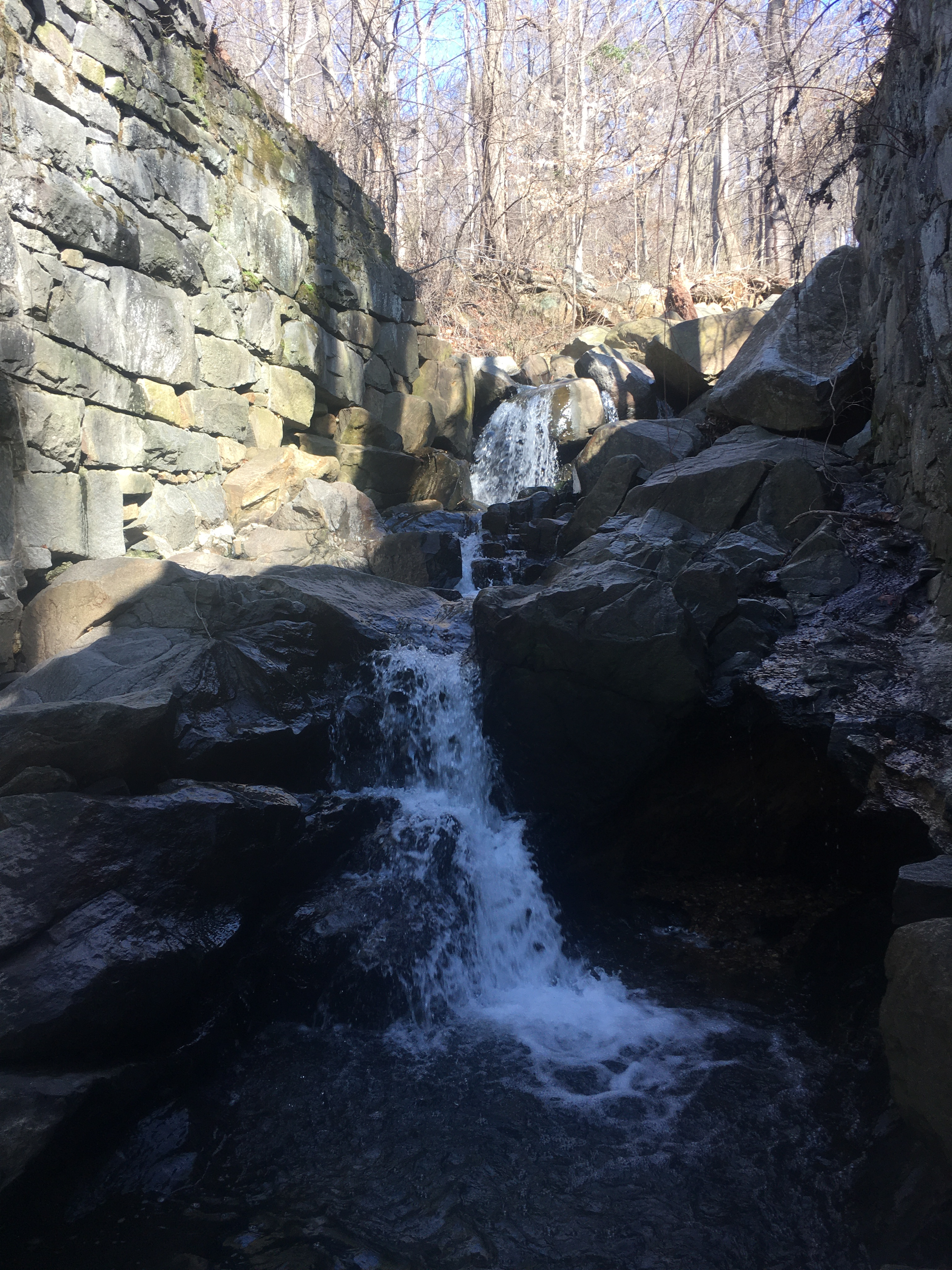

- Location of Alapocas Run mouth Alapocas Run (the United States)

Location
- Country: United States
- State: Delaware
- County: New Castle
- City: Wilmington, Delaware

Physical characteristics
- Source: divide between Brandywine Creek and Shellpot Creek
  - location: Blue Ball, Delaware
  - coordinates: 39°46′50″N 075°32′48″W
  - elevation: 320 ft (98 m)
- Mouth: Brandywine Creek
  - location: Wilmington, Delaware
  - coordinates: 39°46′07″N 075°33′32″W
  - elevation: 40 ft (12 m)
- Length: 1.05 mi (1.69 km)
- Basin size: 0.85 square miles (2.2 km^{2})
- Discharge
  - location: Brandywine Creek
  - average: 1.27 cu ft/s (0.036 m^{3}/s) at mouth with Brandywine Creek

Basin features
- Progression: southwest
- River system: Christina River
- Tributaries
  - left: unnamed tributaries
  - right: unnamed tributaries

Alapocas Run is a 1.05 mi (1.69 km) long tributary to Brandywine Creek in New Castle County, Delaware. This run drains a large portion of Alapocas Run State Park in the Wilmington, Delaware area.

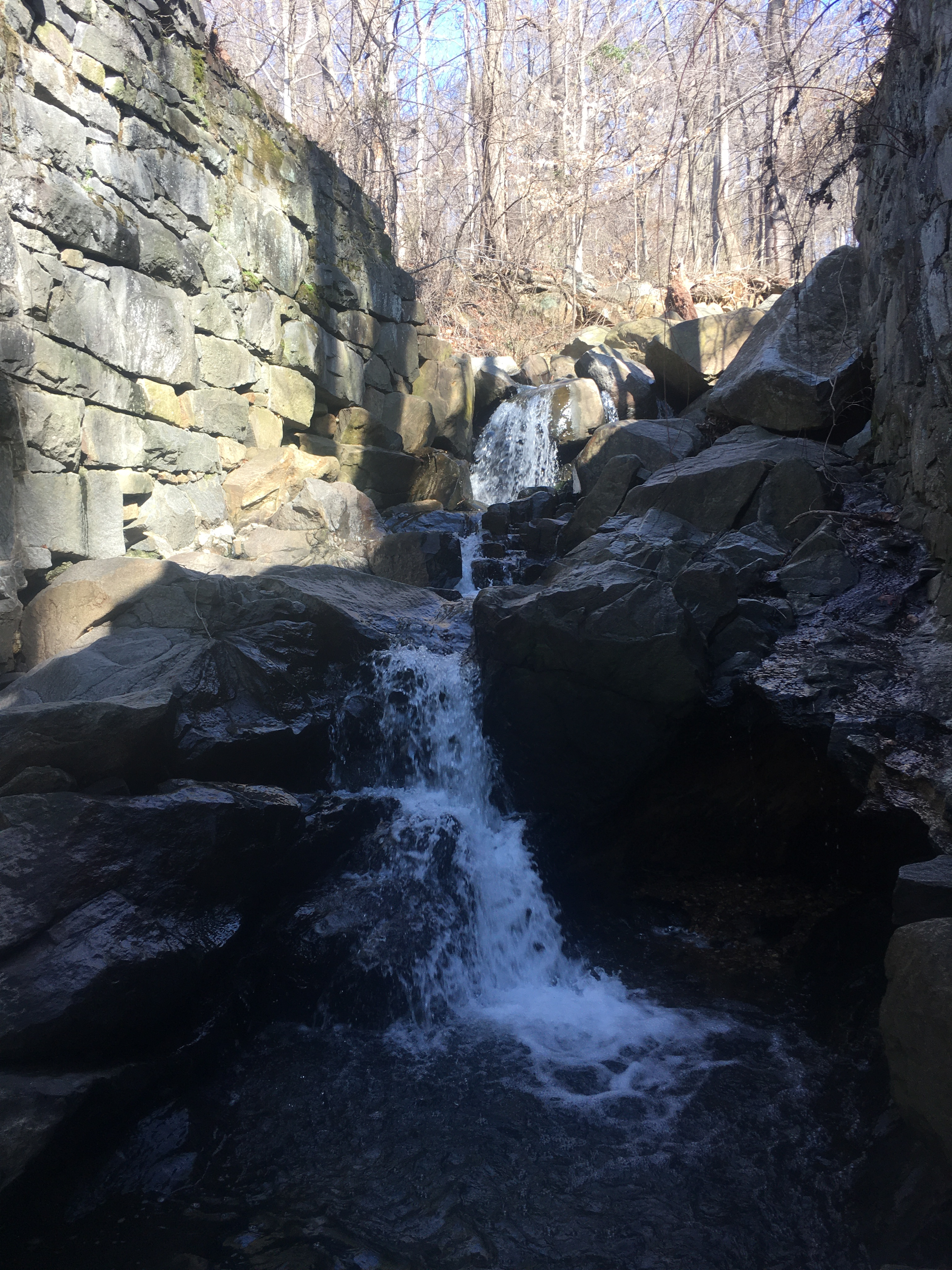
Alapocas Falls in Alapocas Run State Park

== See also ==
- List of Delaware rivers
