= New Castle Hundred =

Subdivision of New Castle County, Delaware

New Castle Hundred is an unincorporated subdivision of New Castle County, Delaware, United States. Hundreds were once used as a basis for representation in the Delaware General Assembly, and while their names still appear on all real estate transactions, they presently have no meaningful use or purpose except as a geographical point of reference.

== Boundaries and Formation ==
New Castle Hundred is that portion of New Castle County that lies south of the Christiana River, north of Red Lion Creek, and generally east of Salem Church Road, excepting that portion in the north included in Wilmington Hundred. It was one of the original hundreds in Delaware created in 1682 and was named for the town of New Castle then the only town of consequence anywhere on the Delaware River. When created it included some of the area now in Pencader Hundred and White Clay Hundred, both of which were split off in 1710, and some of the area in Wilmington Hundred, which was split off 1833. The city of New Castle, the Bear and Wilmington Manor Census Designated Places (CDP) and the community of Red Lion are in New Castle Hundred.

== Development ==
New Castle Hundred is a highly developed suburban and commercial area with considerable industrial development along the Delaware River and near Wilmington.

== Geography ==
Important geographical features, in addition to the Christiana River and Red Lion Creek, include the Delaware River, which forms its eastern boundary. It is in the coastal plain region with a low ridge separating the Delaware and Christiana Rivers.

== Transportation ==
Important roads include portions of Interstate 95, Interstate 295, Interstate 495, the Korean War Veterans Memorial Highway (Delaware Route 1), the DuPont Highway (U.S. Route 13), the Pulaski Highway (U.S. Route 40), Basin Road (Delaware Route 141), New Castle Avenue and River Road (Delaware Route 9), Christiana Road (Delaware Route 273). A portion of the New Castle and Frenchtown Railroad, ran westward from New Castle through the center of the hundred, and the old New Castle Railroad connected New Castle with the mainline of the Philadelphia, Wilmington & Baltimore Railroad, which became the Pennsylvania Railroad; this line is now Norfolk Southern's New Castle Secondary.
