= Green Meadow (Odessa, Delaware) =

Historic house in Delaware, US

- U.S. National Register of Historic Places
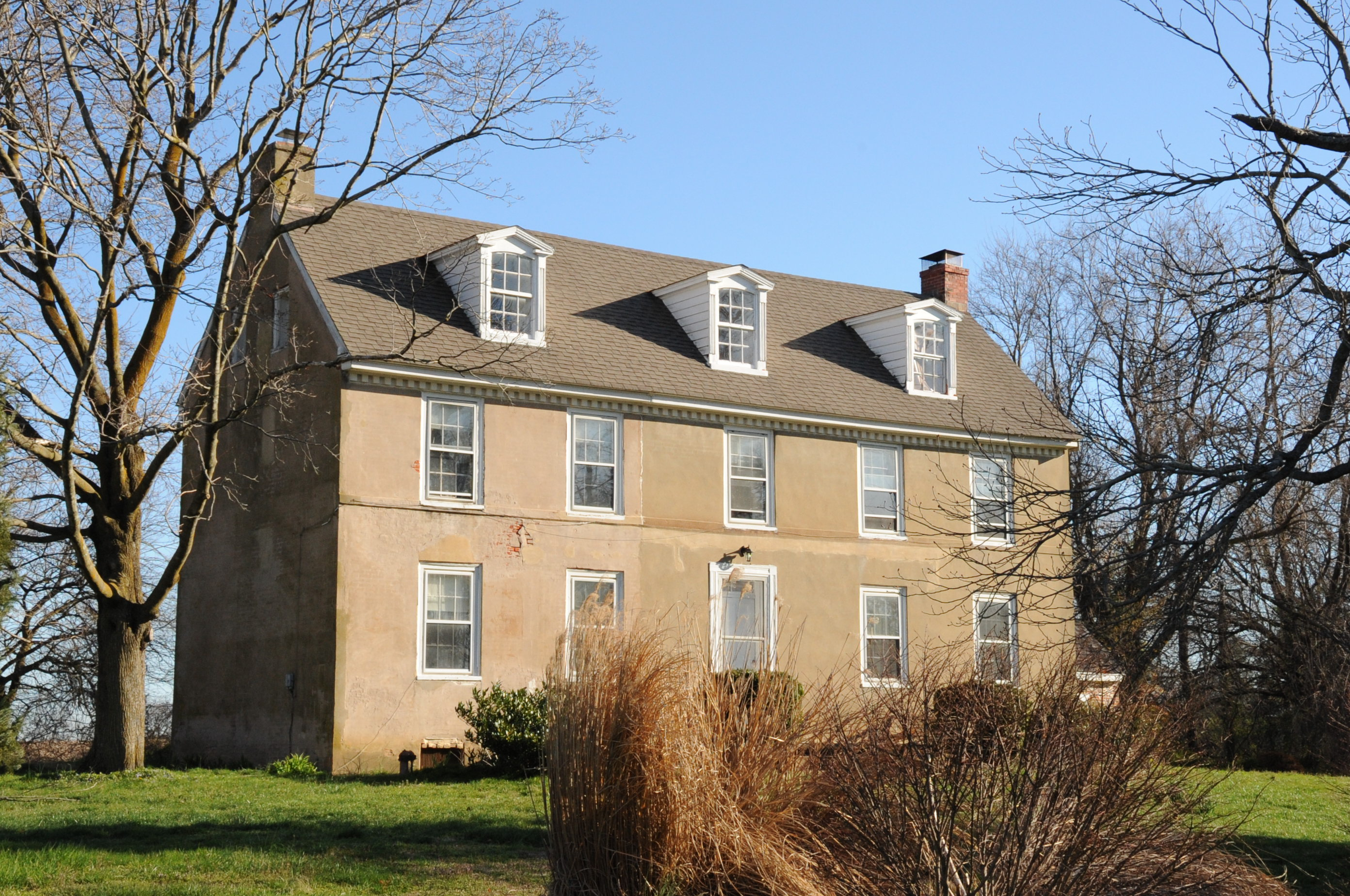

- Location within Delaware Location within the United States
- Location: 484 Thomas Landing Rd. (Road 440) in Appoquinimink Hundred, near Odessa, Delaware
- Coordinates: 39.448346°N 75.613717°W
- Area: 8 acres (3.2 ha)
- Architectural style: Federal
- MPS: Dwellings of the Rural Elite in Central Delaware MPS
- NRHP reference No.: 92001132
- Added to NRHP: September 11, 1992

Green Meadow is a historic home located near Odessa in New Castle County, Delaware, United States. It is a two-story, five-bay brick dwelling with interior brick chimneys at both gable ends. It has a gable roof with dormers. The house measures approximately 50 feet by 19 feet and was built in phases, with the earliest built before 1789. It is in the Federal style. Also on the property are a contributing stone barn (1809) and brick smokehouse.

It was listed on the National Register of Historic Places in 1992.
