= Carpenter-Lippincott House =

Historic house in Delaware, United States

- U.S. National Register of Historic Places
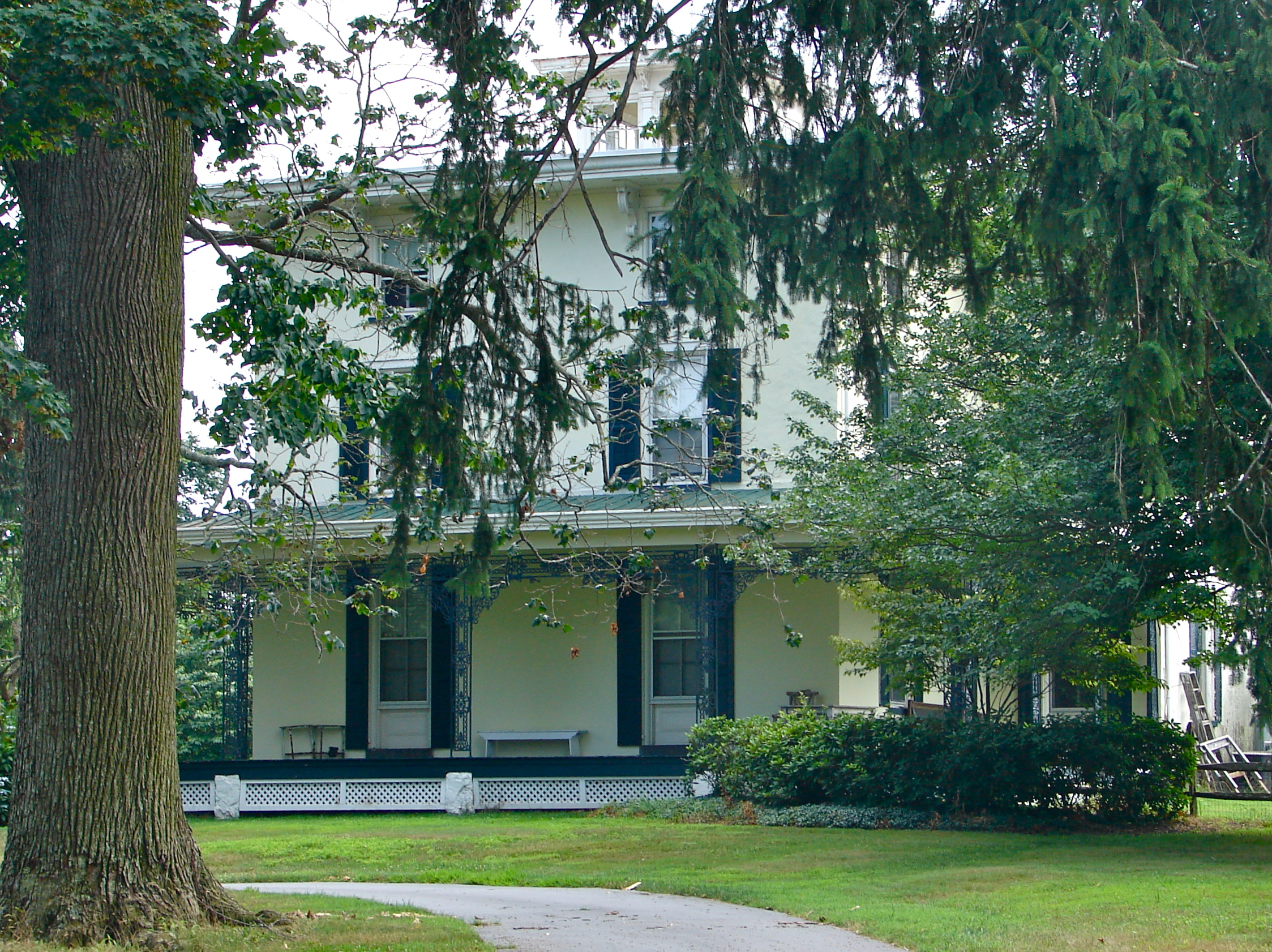
- Carpenter-Lippincott House, July 2011

- Location within Delaware Location within the United States
- Location: 5620 Kennett Pike, Centreville, Delaware
- Coordinates: 39.818207°N 75.616737°W
- Area: 9.8 acres (4.0 ha)
- Built: c. 1840
- Architectural style: Italianate
- MPS: Centreville MRA
- NRHP reference No.: 83001388
- Added to NRHP: April 13, 1983

Carpenter-Lippincott House is a historic home located at Centreville, New Castle County, Delaware. It was built about 1840, and is a three-story, stuccoed stone dwelling in the Italianate-style. It consists of two, well-defined rectangular blocks. The main block is surmounted by a square cupola on its low-hipped roof with projecting eaves and it features an enclosed porch with cast iron lattice work.

It was listed on the National Register of Historic Places in 1983.
