= Centre Meeting and Schoolhouse =

Historic church in Delaware, United States

- Centre Monthly Meeting and Schoolhouse
- U.S. National Register of Historic Places
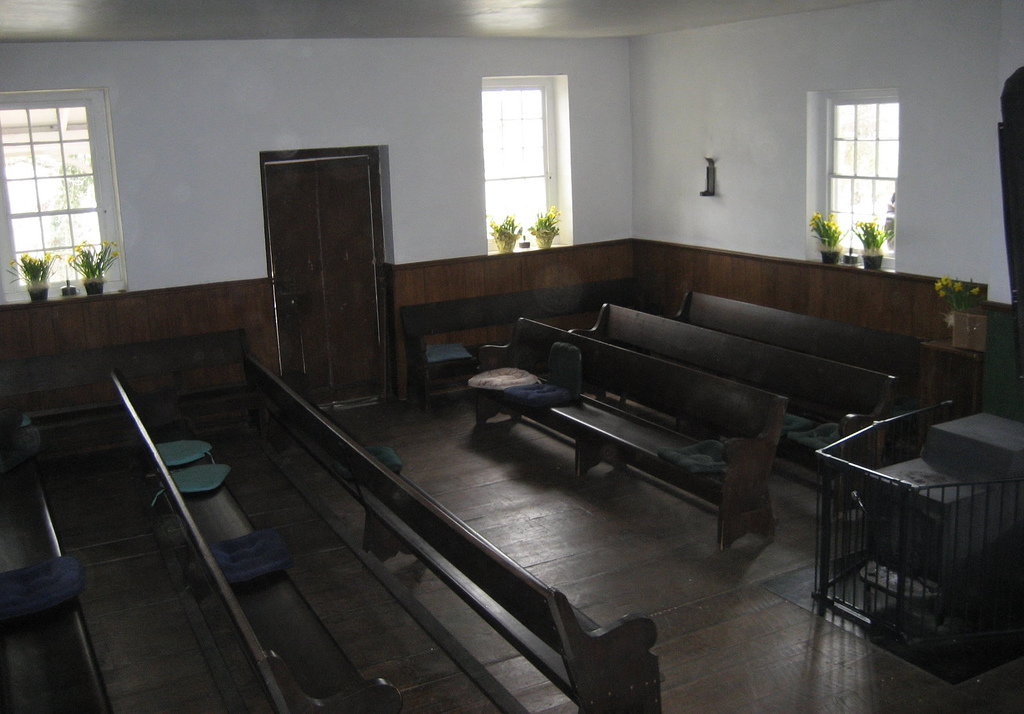
- Centre Meeting interior, January 2008

- Location within Delaware Location within the United States
- Location: 311 Center Meeting Rd., Centerville, Delaware
- Coordinates: 39°49′13″N 75°35′58″W
- Area: 6 acres (2.4 ha)
- Built: 1796
- NRHP reference No.: 71000224
- Added to NRHP: December 16, 1971

Centre Meeting and Schoolhouse, also known as Centre Meeting of Religious Society of Friends, is a historic Quaker meeting house and school located on Center Meeting Road in Centerville, New Castle County, Delaware. It was built in 1796 and is rectangular brick building with pitched roof and brick chimney at either end. Sheds are attached to the east and west sides. The school house was built by the Friends for their children and those of the community. It is square with a pitched roof and a lunette in the gable toward the west.

It was added to the National Register of Historic Places in 1971.
