= Brandywine Hundred =

Administrative area in Delaware, US

- Unincorporated community
- Location within Delaware
- Coordinates: 39°47′30.84″N 75°28′43.68″W
- Country: United States
- State: Delaware
- County: New Castle County
- Founded: 1682

Brandywine Hundred (also known as North Wilmington) is an unincorporated subdivision of New Castle County, Delaware, United States. It is located to the north and northeast of the city of Wilmington. Hundreds were once used as a basis for representation in the Delaware General Assembly. Brandywine Hundred and North Wilmington are commonly used colloquial names for this area. However, while their names still appear on all real estate transactions, all other hundreds in Delaware presently have no meaningful use or purpose except as a geographical point of reference. In the 2010 census, Brandywine had 77,182 people.

== Grubb's Landing ==
Brandywine Hundred, also known as Grubb's Landing, was settled by two sons of John Grubb: Emanuel Grubb and John Grubb II.

== Boundaries and formation ==
Brandywine Hundred is that portion of New Castle County that lies north of the Christina River and east of Brandywine Creek, excepting that portion in the south included in Wilmington Hundred. Its northern boundary follows a portion of the 12 mile arc drawn around the town of New Castle. It was one of the original hundreds in Delaware created in 1682 and was named for Brandywine Creek that flows along its western boundary. When created it included some of the area now in the Wilmington Hundred, which was split off in 1833.

== Development ==
Excepting a still wooded area along Brandywine Creek, the area is completely suburban with almost continuous industrial, commercial and residential development. The eastern portion was built out early in the twentieth century with the remainder in the decades following World War II. The town of Bellefonte, the villages of Arden, Ardencroft, and Ardentown, the Claymont and Edgemoor Census Designated Places (CDP), and the community of Talleyville are in Brandywine Hundred. In recent decades the Hundred has become a major edge city of Philadelphia due in part to Delaware General Corporation Law.

== Geography ==
Important geographical features, in addition to the Christina River and Brandywine Creek, include the Delaware River, which forms its eastern boundary, Naaman's Creek, Stoney Creek (Delaware) and Shellpot Creek. It is mostly in the piedmont region with one of the more dramatic sections of the Fall Line being close enough to the Delaware River to allow many scenic views. Ebright Azimuth, the highest natural elevation in the state at 448 feet (137 m), is located along the northern edge of Brandywine Hundred, very close to the Pennsylvania line. The Hundred has a humid subtropical climate (Cfa) except in higher northern areas where a hot-summer humid continental climate (Dfa) exists because January averages below freezing. Average monthly temperatures in Talleyville range from 31.1 °F in January to 75.4 °F in July, while at the interchange of Interstate 95/495 and Naamans Road they range from 32.8 °F in January to 77.4 °F in July. PRISM Climate Group, Oregon State U The hardiness zone is 7a except near the Delaware River where it is 7b.

== Transportation ==
Important roads include portions of Interstate 95, Interstate 495, Concord Pike (U.S. Route 202), Powder Mill Road (Delaware Route 141), Naamans Road and Thompson Bridge Road (Delaware Route 92), Marsh Road (Delaware Route 3), Foulk Road (Delaware Route 261), Delaware Route 491, and the old main highway between Wilmington and Philadelphia, now Philadelphia Pike (U.S. Route 13). A portion of the Philadelphia, Wilmington and Baltimore Railroad, subsequently the main north–south line of the Pennsylvania Railroad, and now Amtrak's Northeast Corridor, follows the Delaware River, and a portion of the old Baltimore and Ohio Railroad, now CSX Transportation's Philadelphia Subdivision, approximately follows the Fall Line.

== Infrastructure ==
Brandywine Hundred Fire Company provides fire protection services.

== In media ==
Mitchell Hundred, the fictional mayor of New York City and central protagonist of Brian K. Vaughn's comic book series Ex Machina, notes that his surname was derived from Brandywine Hundred, where his ancestors originally settled.

== Education ==
Brandywine School District serves Brandywine Hundred.

New Castle County Library operates the Brandywine Hundred Library. It began operations in April 2003, replacing the Concord Pike Library.

== Famous residents ==
- Joe Biden, President of the United States, lived a large part of his life in Claymont
- John Carney, Governor of Delaware, Claymont
- George Thorogood, blues-rock musician, went to Brandywine High School

== See also ==
- Ebright Azimuth
- John Grubb (Delaware settler)
- Valentine Hollingsworth
