= White Clay Creek Hundred =

Unincorporated area in Delaware, US

White Clay Creek Hundred is an unincorporated subdivision of New Castle County, Delaware. Hundreds were once used as a basis for representation in the Delaware General Assembly, and while their names still appear on all real estate transactions, they presently have no meaningful use or purpose except as a geographical point of reference.

== Boundaries and formation ==
White Clay Creek Hundred is that portion of New Castle County that lies north of the Christina River and south and west of White Clay Creek, excepting that it also includes the small area west of the Christina River immediately west of Newark, and excludes a larger area north and east of the Christina River generally from the old Pennsylvania Railroad tracks to Cooch's Bridge. It was formed from Christiana Hundred and New Castle Hundred in 1710 and was named for White Clay Creek that flows along its northern boundary.

Originally, the default boundary of Delaware and Maryland was the vague height of land between the Delaware River and Chesapeake Bay drainage basins and White Clay Creek Hundred extended to that point. With the running of the Mason–Dixon line in 1767, the western boundary of Delaware was established in its present location and became White Clay Creek Hundred's western boundary. It was the gap between this line and the existing western boundary, the 12 mile arc drawn around the town of New Castle, which created the long-disputed area known as the Wedge.

== Development ==
Except for some preserved woods along White Clay Creek, this area is now completely urban and suburban with continuous industrial, commercial and residential developments, much of it in the small city of Newark, the location of the University of Delaware. The greater part of the city of Newark, and the community of Christiana are in White Clay Creek Hundred, as is the area around Christiana Mall.

== Geography ==
The important geographical features of the hundred are the Christiana River and White Clay Creek. It is mostly in the coastal plain region with a small portion north and west of Newark in the Piedmont above the Fall Line.

== Transportation ==
Important roads include portions of Interstate 95, the Korean War Veterans Memorial Highway (Delaware Route 1), New London Road (Delaware Route 896), Elkton Road, the Kirkwood Highway (Delaware Route 2), Ogletown-Stanton Road (Delaware Route 4), Christiana Road (Delaware Route 273), and the old main highway between Wilmington and Baltimore, now Christiana-Stanton Road (Delaware Route 7) and Old Baltimore Pike. A portion of the Philadelphia, Wilmington and Baltimore Railroad, subsequently the main north–south line of the Pennsylvania Railroad, now Amtrak's Northeast Corridor, crosses through Newark, as does a portion of the old Baltimore and Ohio Railroad, now CSX Transportation's Philadelphia Subdivision. The old Pomeroy and Newark Railroad used to cross from north to south along White Clay Creek and immediately east of Newark.
