= Shellpot Creek =

Shellpot Creek Tributary to Delaware River
- Shellpot Creek at Tarleton Park

- Location of Shellpot Creek mouth Shellpot Creek (the United States)

Location
- Country: United States
- State: Delaware
- County: New Castle
- City: Bellefonte, Delaware

Physical characteristics
- Source: divide between Shellpot Creek and Brandywine Creek
  - location: Between Grubb and Shipley Road in Brandywine Hundred.
  - coordinates: 39°49′19″N 75°31′55″W
  - elevation: 340 ft (100 m)
- Mouth: Delaware River
  - location: Bellefonte, Delaware
  - coordinates: 39°44′05″N 75°30′16″W
  - elevation: 0 ft (0 m)
- Length: 8.7 miles
- Basin size: 9.32 square miles (24.1 km^{2})

Basin features
- Progression: Delaware River → Delaware Bay → Atlantic Ocean
- River system: Delaware River
- Tributaries
  - left: unnamed tributaries
  - right: Turkey Run; Matson Run

Shellpot Creek is a tributary of the Delaware River in northeast New Castle County, Delaware. The stream rises between Grubb Road and Shipley Road, south of Naaman's Road at 39°49′19″N 75°31′55″W in Brandywine Hundred and flows southeast for about six miles before discharging into the Delaware River at 39°44′05″N 75°30′16″W near Edgemoor. Prior to 1938, the stream drained into the Brandywine Creek, but was subsequently redirected to the Delaware River.

The watershed has a drainage area of nearly 15 square miles, and is the most suburbanized drainage area in the state-designated "Piedmont Basin" (which consists of the watersheds of the Christina River, Brandywine Creek, Red Clay Creek, White Clay Creek, Naamans Creek, and Shellpot Creek). New Castle County, the Calpine Edge Moor Power Plant, the former Chemours Edge Moor plant, Amtrak, and the City of Wilmington all discharge storm-water into Shellpot Creek. During Tropical Storm Allison (1989), the creek flooded to record levels, with the flow rising from 1,300 gallons per minute to 3.6 millions of gallons per minute (or more than 8,000 cubic feet per second).

The name is likely derived from the Swedish Sköllpadde Fallet (meaning "Turtle Falls"), and has been historically known as "Schillpades", "Skilpot", and "Shilpot".

== See also ==
- List of rivers of Delaware
- Shellpot Park
