= Bellefonte, Delaware =

- Town
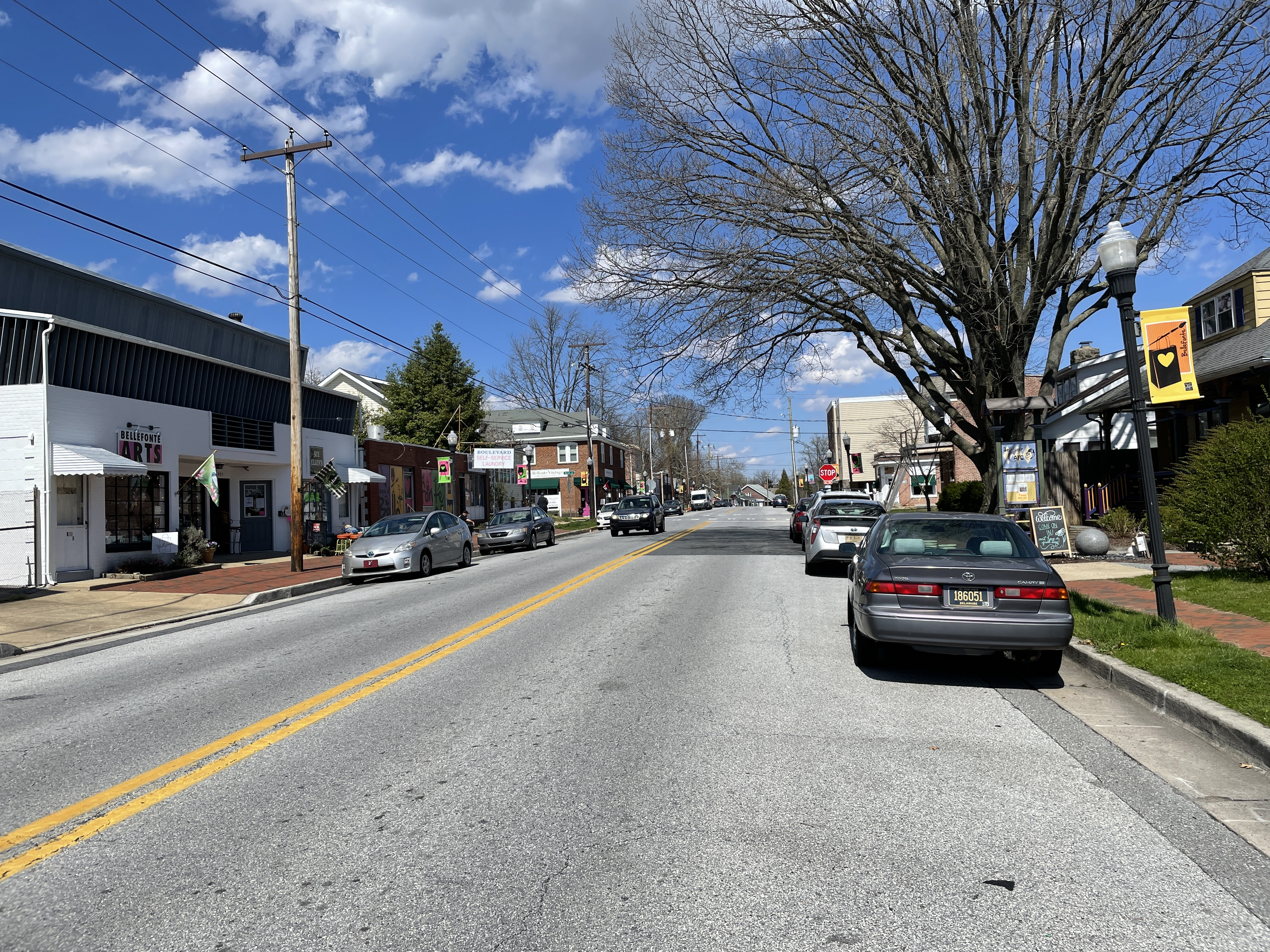
- Brandywine Boulevard in Bellefonte

- Flag Seal

- Location of Bellefonte in New Castle County, Delaware.

- Location within the state of Delaware Bellefonte (the United States)
- Coordinates: 39°45′58″N 75°30′34″W
- Country: United States
- State: Delaware
- County: New Castle

Area
  - Total: 0.18 sq mi (0.46 km^{2})
  - Land: 0.18 sq mi (0.46 km^{2})
  - Water: 0 sq mi (0.00 km^{2})
- Elevation: 184 ft (56 m)

Population (2020)
  - Total: 1,225
  - Density: 6,912.8/sq mi (2,669.04/km^{2})
- Time zone: UTC−5 (Eastern (EST))
  - Summer (DST): UTC−4 (EDT)
- Area code: 302
- FIPS code: 10-04650
- GNIS feature ID: 213628
- Website: www.townofbellefonte.com

Bellefonte is a town in New Castle County, Delaware, United States. According to the 2020 Census, the population of the town is 1,225.

== Geography ==
Bellefonte is located at 39°45′58″N 75°30′34″W (39.7662246, –75.5093647). The town is roughly centered at the intersection of Brandywine Boulevard and Bellefonte Avenue.

According to the United States Census Bureau, the town has a total area of 0.2 square miles (0.52 km^{2}), all land.

=== Climate ===
The climate in this area is characterized by hot, humid summers and generally mild to cool winters. According to the Köppen Climate Classification system, Bellefonte has a humid subtropical climate, abbreviated "Cfa" on climate maps.

== Infrastructure ==
=== Transportation ===
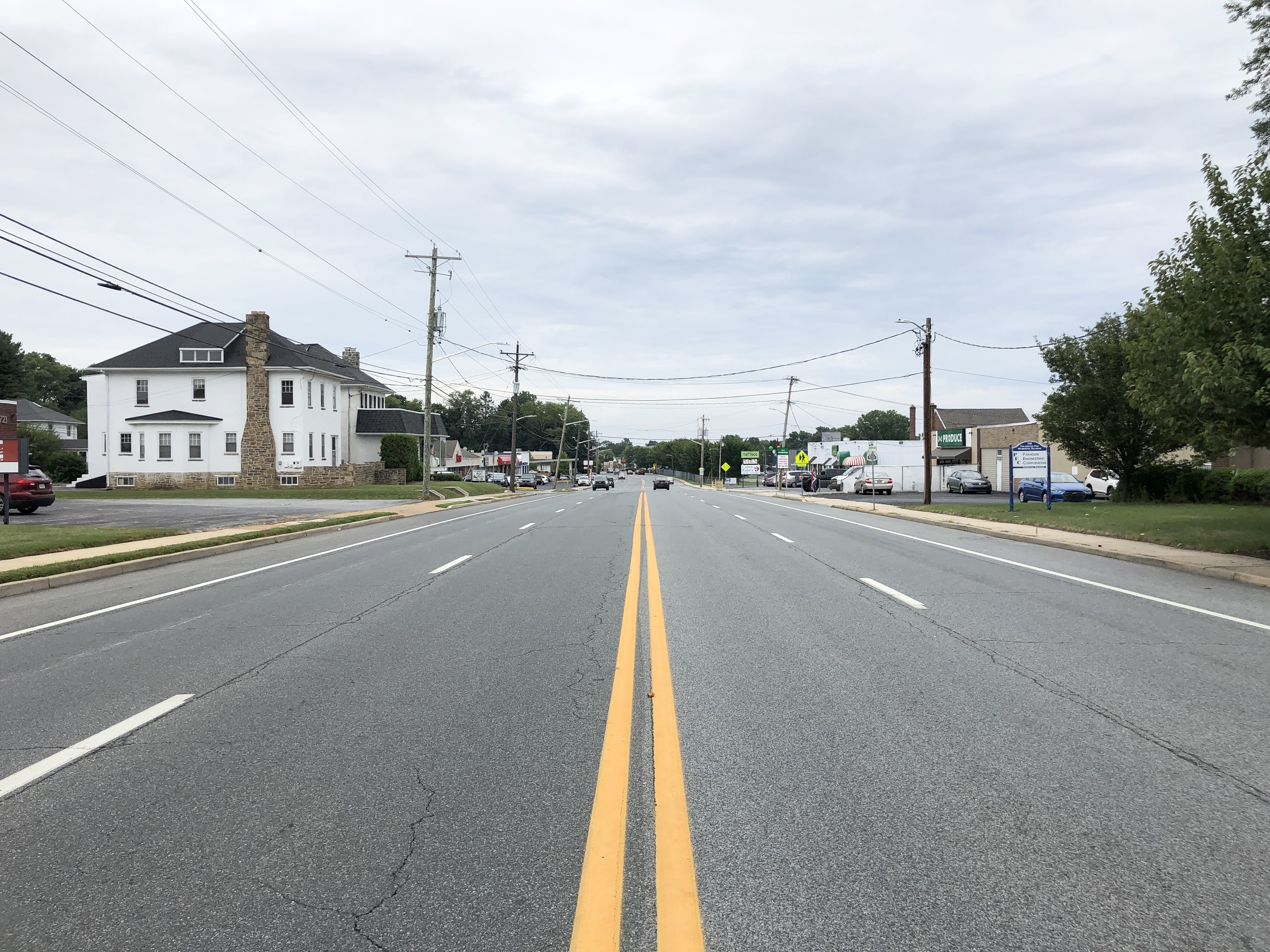
US 13 Bus. in Bellefonte

Brandywine Boulevard serves as the main street through Bellefonte, passing southwest-northeast through the town. U.S. Route 13 Business (Philadelphia Pike) passes along the northwestern edge of Bellefonte, heading northeast to Claymont and southwest to Wilmington. Delaware Route 3 passes to the west of Bellefonte and provides access to Interstate 95 to the north and Interstate 495 to the south in Edgemoor. The nearest train station to Bellefonte is the Wilmington station, which is served by Amtrak and SEPTA Regional Rail's Wilmington/Newark Line. DART First State provides bus service to Bellefonte along its route between the Walmart on Wilton Boulevard in New Castle and Claymont station in Claymont via Wilmington; and Route 4, which begins at the Village at Fox Point Apartments just southeast of Bellefonte and heads west to Wilmington and Prices Corner.

=== Utilities ===
Delmarva Power, a subsidiary of Exelon, provides electricity and natural gas to Bellefonte. Suez Delaware, a subsidiary of Suez North America, provides water to Bellefonte. Sewer service in Bellefonte is provided by New Castle County. Trash and recycling collection in Bellefonte is provided under contract by GFL Environmental.

== Education ==
Bellefonte is in the Brandywine School District.

Zoned schools are as follows: Mount Pleasant Elementary School, P. S. DuPont Middle School, and Mount Pleasant High School.

Previously Bellefonte was in the Mount Pleasant School District.

== Demographics ==
Historical population
Census	Pop.	Note	%±
1920	291		—
1930	761		161.5%
1940	2,593		240.7%
1950	1,472		−43.2%
1960	1,536		4.3%
1970	1,442		−6.1%
1980	1,279		−11.3%
1990	1,243		−2.8%
2000	1,249		0.5%
2010	1,193		−4.5%
2020	1,225		2.7%
U.S. Decennial Census

=== 2020 census ===
As of the 2020 census, Bellefonte had a population of 1,225. The median age was 44.1 years. 17.8% of residents were under the age of 18 and 16.3% of residents were 65 years of age or older. For every 100 females there were 101.5 males, and for every 100 females age 18 and over there were 98.2 males age 18 and over.

100.0% of residents lived in urban areas, while 0.0% lived in rural areas.

There were 563 households in Bellefonte, of which 27.7% had children under the age of 18 living in them. Of all households, 36.8% were married-couple households, 22.6% were households with a male householder and no spouse or partner present, and 30.9% were households with a female householder and no spouse or partner present. About 34.1% of all households were made up of individuals and 10.5% had someone living alone who was 65 years of age or older.

There were 578 housing units, of which 2.6% were vacant. The homeowner vacancy rate was 0.7% and the rental vacancy rate was 0.7%.

Racial composition as of the 2020 census
Race	Number	Percent
White	1,040	84.9%
Black or African American	58	4.7%
American Indian and Alaska Native	3	0.2%
Asian	13	1.1%
Native Hawaiian and Other Pacific Islander	0	0.0%
Some other race	16	1.3%
Two or more races	95	7.8%
Hispanic or Latino (of any race)	50	4.1%

=== 2000 census ===
At the 2000 census there were 1,249 people, 537 households, and 325 families living in the town. The population density was 7,102.7 inhabitants per square mile (2,742.4/km^{2}). There were 551 housing units at an average density of 3,133.4 per square mile (1,209.8/km^{2}). The racial makeup of the town was 95.92% White, 2.40% African American, 0.64% Asian, 0.56% from other races, and 0.48% from two or more races. Hispanic or Latino of any race were 1.20%.

Of the 537 households 28.5% had children under the age of 18 living with them, 45.4% were married couples living together, 10.1% had a female householder with no husband present, and 39.3% were non-families. 32.2% of households were one person and 12.1% were one person aged 65 or older. The average household size was 2.33 and the average family size was 3.00.

The age distribution was 23.5% under the age of 18, 5.0% from 18 to 24, 35.0% from 25 to 44, 21.1% from 45 to 64, and 15.5% 65 or older. The median age was 38 years. For every 100 females, there were 93.6 males. For every 100 females age 18 and over, there were 90.1 males.

The median household income was $49,231 and the median family income was $59,375. Males had a median income of $37,723 versus $30,078 for females. The per capita income for the town was $22,661. About 2.1% of families and 4.0% of the population were below the poverty line, including 5.9% of those under age 18 and 6.7% of those age 65 or over.

== Government ==
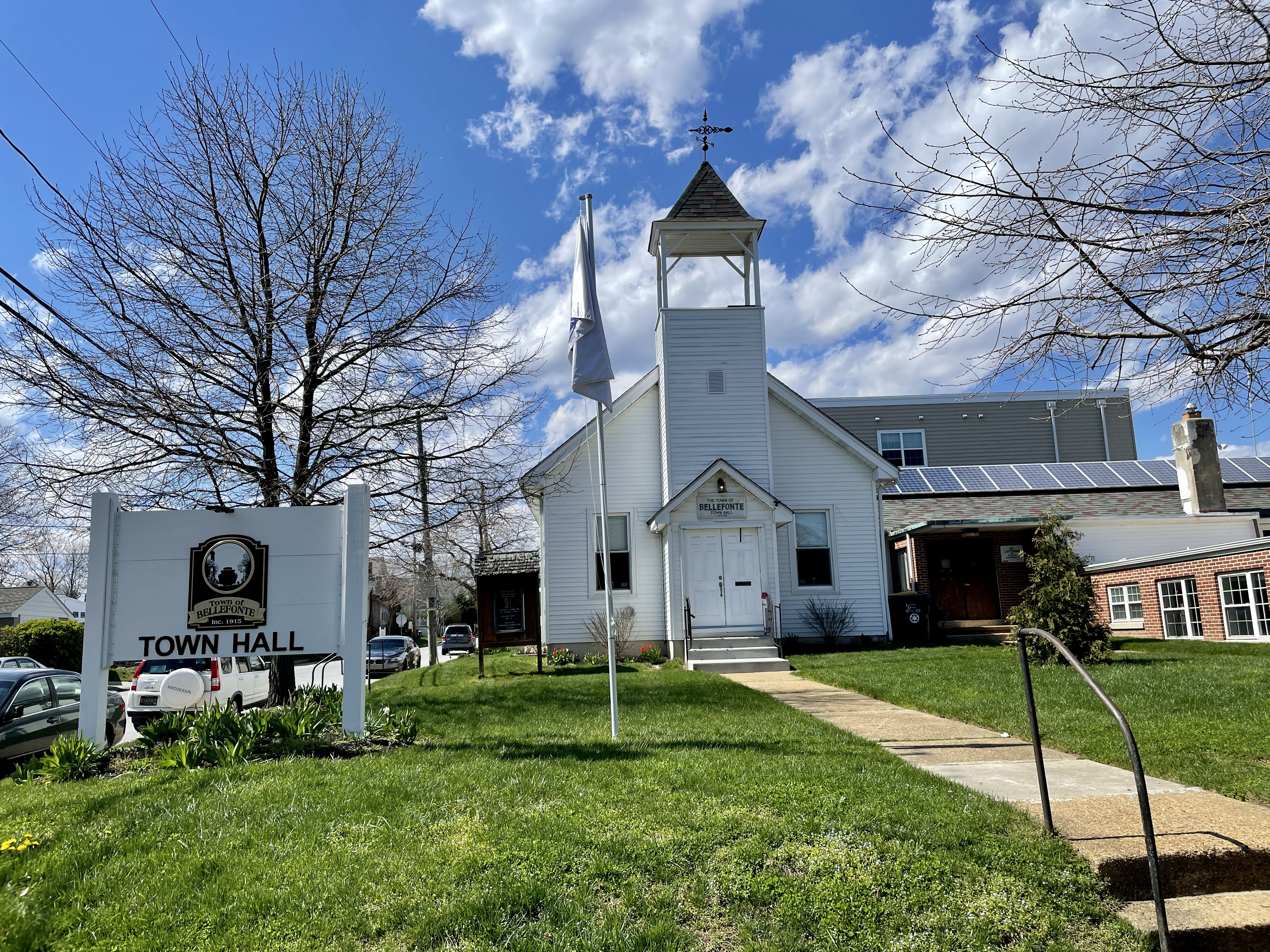
Town hall in Bellefonte

Bellefonte is governed by a five-member Town Commission. As of 2023, the Town Commission consists of President Scott MacKenzie (term expires June 2023), Secretary Andrew Ritchie (term expires June 2024), Elisa King (term expires June 2023), Brandon Dougherty (term expires June 2024), and Ross Logan (term expires June 2024).

== See also ==
- List of municipalities in Delaware
