= List of lighthouses in Delaware =

This is a list of all lighthouses in the U.S. state of Delaware as identified by the United States Coast Guard. The first lighthouse in the state was erected in 1769 and the last in 1925 (ignoring automated towers erected later); the oldest active light is the Fenwick Island Light.

If not otherwise noted, focal height and coordinates are taken from the United States Coast Guard Light List, while location and dates of activation, automation, and deactivation are taken from the United States Coast Guard Historical information site for lighthouses.

Name	Image	Location	Coordinates	Year first lit	Automated	Year deactivated	Current Lens	Focal Height
Baker Shoal Range Front Light		Port Penn	39.5409°N 75.5666°W	1902 (First); 2002 (Current)	1924	Active (Original demolished)	LED	35 ft (11 m)
Baker Shoal Range Rear Light		Port Penn	39.5120°N 75.5699°W	1904	1924	Active	Unknown	110 ft (34 m)
Bellevue Range Rear Light		Wilmington	39.7203°N 75.5179°W	1909 (First); 2001 (Current)	1934	Active (skeleton tower)	Unknown	100 ft (30 m)
Cape Henlopen Beacon		Lewes (Cape Henlopen)	38.7903°N 75.0806°W	1825 (First); 1864 (Last)	Never	1884 (Demolished)	None	45 ft (14 m)
Cape Henlopen Light		Lewes (Cape Henlopen)	38.778°N 75.084°W	1769	Never	1924 (Destroyed in 1926)	None	126 ft (38 m)
Cherry Island Range Rear Light		Bellefonte	39.762°N 75.490°W	1880 (First); 1970s (Current)	1933	Active (Original demolished)	Unknown	120 ft (37 m)
Christiana Light	None known	Christina River (Entrance)	39.722°N 75.520°W	1835	Never	1909 (Demolished in 1939)	None	44 ft (13 m)
Christiana North Jetty Light		Christina River (Entrance)	39.718°N 75.516°W	1884	Never	Unknown (Destroyed)	None	37 ft (11 m)
Delaware Breakwater East End Light		Lewes	38.7972°N 75.1003°W	1885	1950	1996	Unknown	60 ft (18 m)
Delaware Breakwater Range Front Light (Delaware Breakwater West End Light)		Lewes	38.7992°N 75.1081°W	1838	Never	1903 (Demolished in 1950)	None	45 ft (14 m)
Delaware Breakwater Range Rear Light		Lewes	38.7897°N 75.1694°W	1881	Never	1918 (Re-erected in Florida)	None	103 ft (31 m)
Fenwick Island Light		Fenwick Island	38.4514°N 75.0550°W	1859	1978	Active (Inactive: 1978-1982)	Third-order Fresnel	83 ft (25 m)
Fourteen Foot Bank Light		Delaware Bay	39.0482°N 75.1822°W	1887	1973	Active	Unknown	59 ft (18 m)
Harbor of Refuge Light		Lewes	38.8145°N 75.0924°W	1908 (First); 1926 (Current)	1973	Active	VRB-25	72 ft (22 m)
Liston Range Front Light		Port Penn	39.4825°N 75.5917°W	1906	1948?	1954 (Now a private house)	None	45 ft (14 m)
Liston Range Rear Light		Biddles Corner	39.5238°N 75.6397°W	1906	1930s	Active	Unknown	176 ft (54 m)
Mahon River Light		Port Mahon	39.1850°N 75.4008°W	1831 (First); 1903 (Last)	Never	1955 (Destroyed in 1984)	None	37 ft (11 m)
Marcus Hook Range Front Light		Bellefonte	39.7760°N 75.4754°W	1915 (First); 1918 (Current)	Always	Active	Unknown	81 ft (25 m)
Marcus Hook Range Rear Light		Bellefonte	39.7622°N 75.5032°W	1919	1950s	Active	DCB-24	278 ft (85 m)
Mispillion Light		Lewes	38.9475°N 75.3156°W	1831 (First); 1873 (Last)	1911	1929 (Burned in 2002, rebuilt as a replica)	Decorative	46 ft (14 m)
New Castle Range Front Light		New Castle	39.6424°N 75.5954°W	1876 (First); 1964 (Current)	1930s	Active (skeleton tower)	Unknown	56 ft (17 m)
New Castle Range Rear Light		New Castle	39.6482°N 75.5990°W	1876 (First); 1953 (Current)	1953	Active (skeleton tower)	Unknown	100 ft (30 m)
Reedy Island Range Rear Light		Taylors Bridge	39.4065°N 75.5902°W	1910	Unknown	Active	DCB-224	134 ft (41 m)
