= Biddles Corner, Delaware =

- Location within Delaware Location within the United States
- Coordinates: 39°31′30″N 75°38′57″W
- Country: United States
- State: Delaware
- County: New Castle
- Elevation: 33 ft (10 m)
- Time zone: UTC-5 (Eastern (EST))
  - Summer (DST): UTC-4 (EDT)
- Area code: 302
- GNIS feature ID: 217031

Biddles Corner is a location in St. George's Hundred, New Castle County, Delaware, United States.

Biddles Corner is at the intersection of U.S. Route 13 and Port Penn Road just east of the Biddles Corner toll plaza on the Delaware Route 1 toll road south of the Chesapeake and Delaware Canal, and the northern terminus of U.S. Route 301.

== History ==
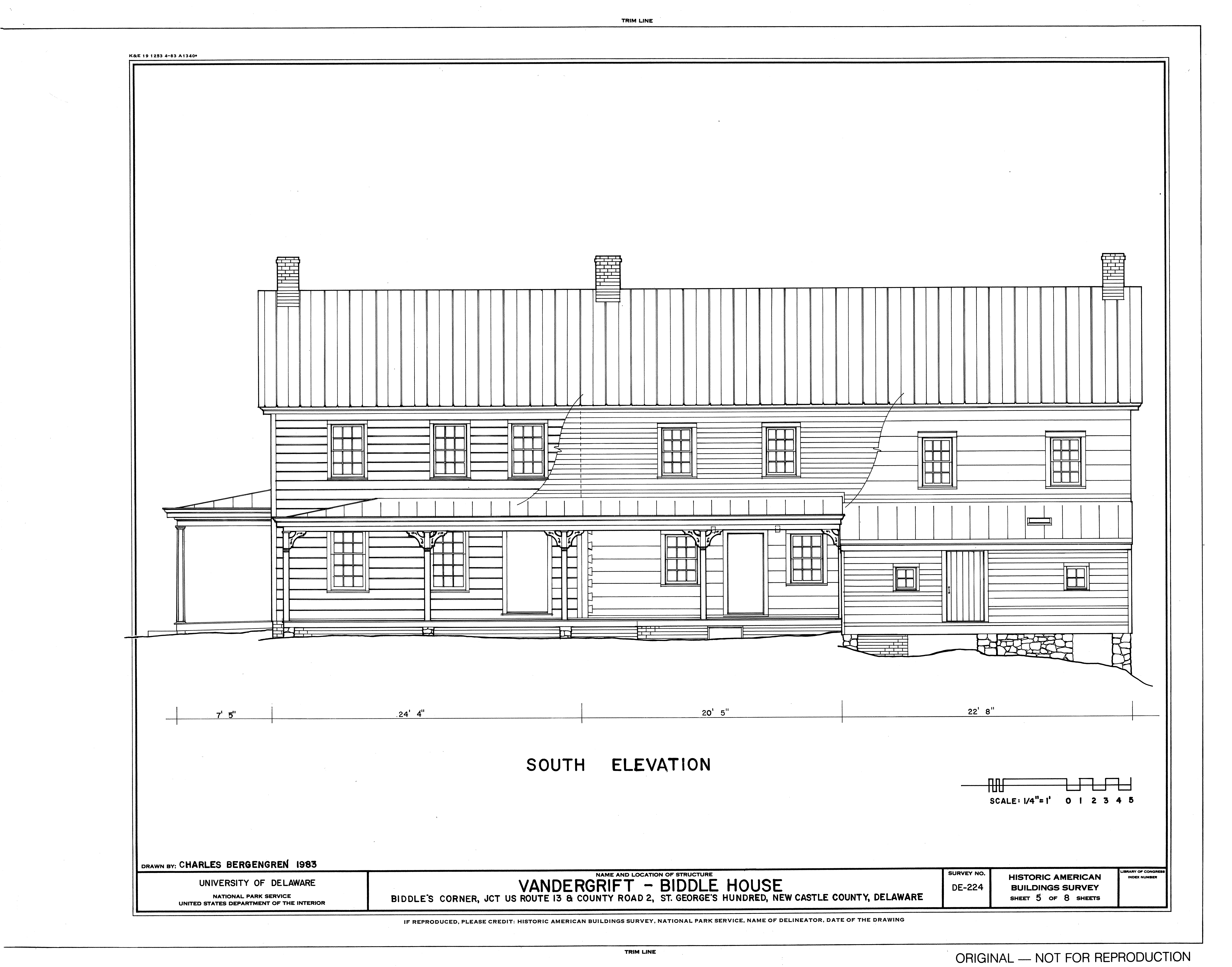
Vandergrift-Biddle House, Saint Georges Hundred, Biddles Corner, New Castle County.

=== 1700s to 1850 ===
The Vandergrift-Biddle House was built at Biddles Corner starting in the 18th century. The original property, consisting of 179 acres, was granted to Leonard Vandegrift by Thomas and William Penn in 1708 and became the Biddles Corner farm. The Vandergrift-Biddle House was listed on the National Register of Historic Places in 1978.

The Retirement Barn, a historically important barn, was built in the Biddles Corner area between 1790 and 1810. The barn "is the last known surviving example in southern New Castle County of a tri-partite (three bay) traditional English style barn. Common in the 18th century this barn type was replaced with other modern agricultural building types in the mid 1800s." It was listed on the National Register of Historic Places in 1985.

The Mondamon Farm Barrack, built in the early 1800s, is "the last known example of a mid 19th-century earthfast hay barrack to survive in New Castle County". Open-sided hay structures like the barrack were once common in the 1700s and early 1800s. It was also listed on the National Register of Historic Places in 1985.

=== 1850 to present ===
The Craven House, in the vicinity of Biddles Corner, was built in the mid-19th century.

The 120 ft (37 m)-tall Liston Range Rear Lighthouse was built circa 1876 to 1877 east of its present site and was moved near Biddles Corner in 1906. The lighthouse was listed on the National Register of Historic Places in 1978 and is Delaware's tallest lighthouse.

In 1884, the Fort Penn Grange was building a large hall at Biddles Corner with an exhibition room. The grange hosted various events in the hall such as magicians and Punch and Judy acts.

In 1979, the ChesDel Diner opened in St. Georges at Biddles Corner. Called a "Biddles Corner staple", the restaurant closed in 2018.

The Biddles Corner toll plaza opened in 1999. The busy toll plaza has exceeded 360,000 vehicles on holiday weekends.

== See also ==
- National Register of Historic Places listings in southern New Castle County, Delaware
