= Reedy Island =

Island in New Castle County, Delaware, United States

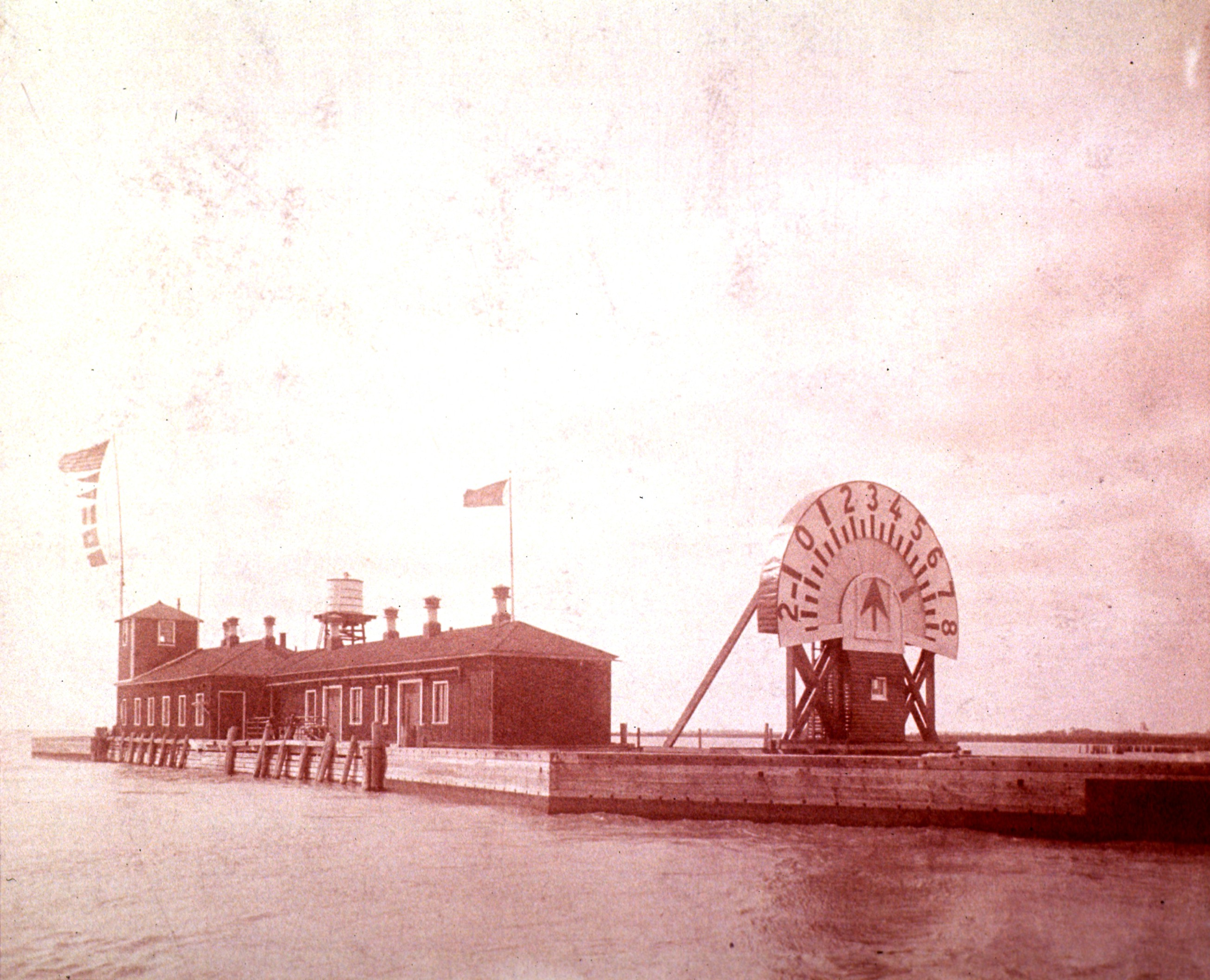
- Reedy Island as it appeared while in use as a quarantine facility

- Location within Delaware

Geography
- Location: Delaware River
- Coordinates: 39°30′55″N 75°33′47″W

Administration
- United States
- State: Delaware
- County: New Castle County

Reedy Island is a small island in the middle of the channel of the Delaware River near its mouth on the Delaware Bay in the U.S. state of Delaware. It is about one mile (1.6 km) east of Port Penn, Delaware and five miles (8 km) southwest of Salem, New Jersey.

The island was the location of Reedy Island Range Front Light and the Reedy Island Quarantine Station. The Reedy Island Range Rear Light, in nearby Taylors Bridge, is a historic lighthouse first established in 1910. The light is operated by the United States Coast Guard. The nearby keeper's house was destroyed in 2002.

== See also ==
- Pea Patch Island
