= Baker Shoal Range Front Light =

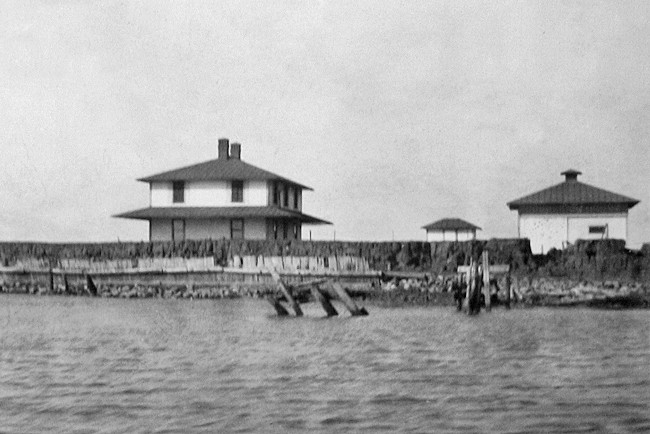
- Original dwellings at the front range light.
- Location: Port Penn; Delaware; United States
- Coordinates: 39.511769°N 75.566582°W

Tower
- Constructed: 1902 (first); 1904 (second); 1924 (third)
- Foundation: platform on wooden piles
- Construction: metal skeletal tower
- Automated: 1924
- Shape: square pyramidal skeletal tower with gallery (current)
- Power source: solar power
- Operator: United States Coast Guard

Light
- First lit: 2002 (current)
- Deactivated: 1924 (first)
- Focal height: 35 feet (11 m); 15 feet (4.6 m) (passing light)
- Lens: LED
- Characteristic: F G (along range line); Fl W 4s. (passing light)

The Baker Shoal Range Front Light was a lighthouse in Delaware, United States, on the Delaware River at Port Penn.

== History ==
The Baker Range Front Light was discontinued in 1924 and a new steel tower was built. The original lighthouse was removed or destroyed and the new tower is an active aid to navigation.

There was a Baker Shoal Range Rear Light that originally served as the Port Penn-Reedy Island Range Light. It became the Baker Shoal Rear Range Light in 1904 when the old range was discontinued due to the C&D channel moving.

== See also ==
- List of lighthouses in Delaware
- List of lighthouses in the United States
