= Reedy Island Range Rear Light =

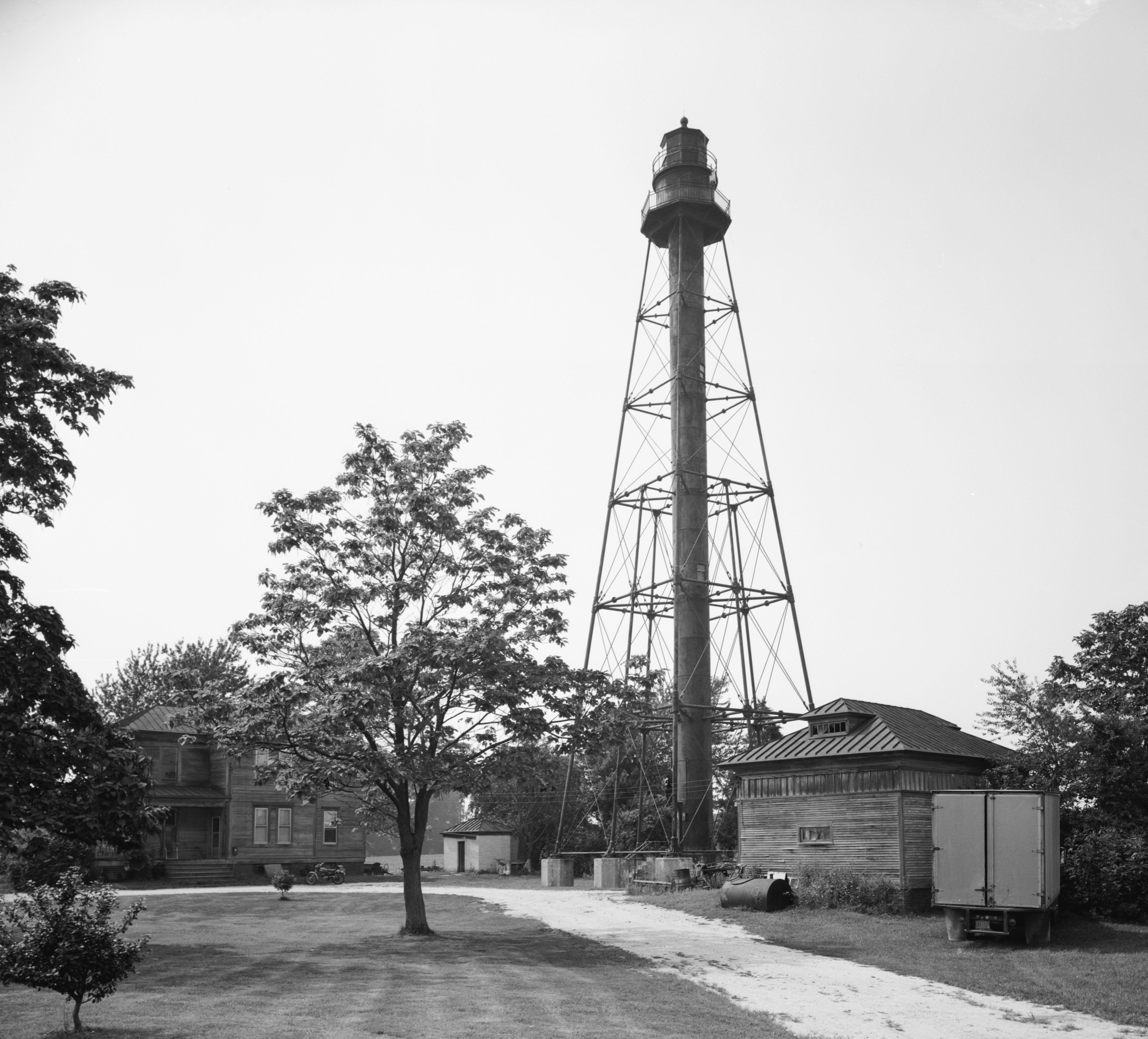
- Reedy Island Range Rear Light
- Location: 1171 Taylors Bridge Road, Taylors Bridge, Delaware
- Coordinates: 39.4066°N 75.5902°W

Tower
- Foundation: 9 concrete piers
- Construction: Cast iron
- Height: 110 feet (34 m)
- Shape: Skeletal tower
- Heritage: National Register of Historic Places listed place

Light
- First lit: 1910
- Focal height: 134 feet (41 m)
- Lens: Fifth order Fresnel lens (original), DCB-224 (current)
- Characteristic: Flashing white with red sector
- Reedy Island Range Rear Light
- U.S. National Register of Historic Places
- Nearest city: Taylor's Bridge, Delaware
- Area: 0.8 acres (0.32 ha)
- Architectural style: Colonial Revival
- NRHP reference No.: 89000288
- Added to NRHP: March 27, 1989

Reedy Island Range Rear Lighthouse is a skeletal tower lighthouse near Taylor's Bridge, Delaware. The tower is an active aid to navigation.

== History ==
This and several other range lights were built as part of a channel dredging project in the early 1900s. The new channel (heading north toward Philadelphia) made a series of turns somewhat south of Reedy Island, which lies close to the Delaware shore off Port Penn. Prior to this the channel leading from the south was marked by the Port Penn Range, the rear light of which would be moved to become the Liston Range Rear Light (the Liston Range replacing the older range). Then a new short segment was added turning north, which was confusingly first named the Reedy Island Range but was renamed the Baker Range when permanent lights were erected. The last segment, past Reedy Island, became the Reedy Island Range.

Construction (and the case of the Liston Range, relocation) of permanent lights was delayed, and a collection of temporary lights was used when the channels were first dredged. In the case of the Reedy Island Range the original rear light was a locomotive headlight on a tall pole which was first lit in 1904. The original proposal for a permanent light would have moved the Finns Point Range Light to serve this location instead, but mariners objected to this, and in 1906 the lighthouse board had to request an appropriation for construction of a new tower, which was not funded until 1908. This tower was of conventional skeletal design, originally equipped with a fifth order Fresnel lens, since replaced with an aerobeacon. A keeper's house and other supporting structures had long since stood where the tower was to be erected, having been erected back in 1906 with funds from the original appropriation for the range. A second house and skeleton tower stood at water's edge.

The light was automated at an unknown date and continues in use.

The light station was added to the National Register of Historic Places in 1989. The keeper's house was destroyed in a 2002 fire.
