= Christiana Light =

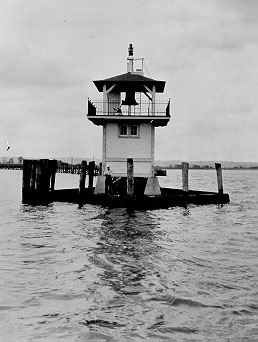
- Location: north shore of Christina River
- Coordinates: 39°43′18″N 75°31′15″W

Tower
- Construction: brick
- Shape: octagonal tower house on roof

Light
- First lit: 1835
- Deactivated: 1909
- Focal height: 44 feet (13 m)
- Lens: originally reflectors/lamps; converted to fourth order Fresnel Lens
- Characteristic: F G

The Christiana Light was a historic lighthouse located on the Christina River in Delaware. It was deactivated when new range lights came into service and was demolished in 1939.

== History ==
The Christina River was the historic entrance to Wilmington's harbor (the present Port of Wilmington sits at the river's mouth on the Delaware River) and therefore an early candidate for a light. This was established in 1835 in the form of a two-story house with a short tower on its roof. The original beacon was a set of ten lamps and reflectors, reduced to eight by 1841. In 1844 the oil lamps were replaced with an experimental system producing "rosin gas" on-site through a chemical reaction. The Christiana beacon was the first light to use this system, but, although it supposedly was considerably cheaper than oil, the system was not adopted, and the light switched back to conventional fuel the following year. A fourth-order Fresnel lens eventually replaced the reflector system.

In 1869 a depot was constructed for buoy maintenance; caissons for some lighthouses were also assembled there. This location proved inferior and the facility was moved further up the Delaware in 1881. In 1884 the Christiana North Jetty Light was erected; its fog bell was operated remotely from electrical equipment located in the Christiana Light's building.

In 1909 Bellevue range lights were activated to mark the route up the Delaware. The rear light was placed next to the jetty, and as it rendered the older light obsolete, the Christiana Light was discontinued that year. It remained standing for years but was finally pulled down in 1939.

As far as is known, the oldest keeper in the United States was stationed at Christiana Light. Anthony Christy was ninety-six when he was appointed in 1853, and occupied the post until his death in 1862 at the age of a hundred and five.
