= Ashton Historic District =

Ashton Historic District may refer to:

- Ashton Historic District (Port Penn, Delaware), listed on the National Register of Historic Places (NRHP)
- Ashton Historic District (Cumberland, Rhode Island), NRHP-listed
- Old Ashton Historic District, Lincoln, Rhode Island, NRHP-listed
