= Stubbs House =

Stubbs House may refer to:

in Canada

- Stubbs House, Kelowna, British Columbia, a historic house in Kelowna

in the United States

- Elizabeth Stubbs House, Little Creek, Kent County, Delaware, listed on the National Register of Historic Places (NRHP)
- Wells-Stubbs House, Fairfield, Iowa, NRHP-listed
- Stubbs-Ballah House, Norfolk, Nebraska, NRHP-listed
