= New Castle Range Front Light =

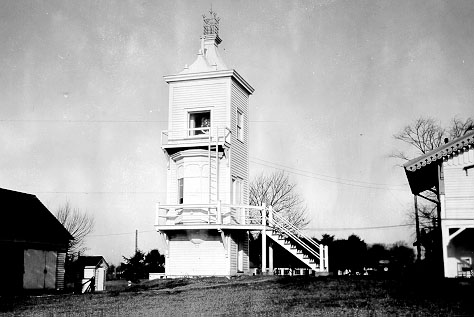
- The light in 1933
- Location: Just south of 314 Bay W Blvd, New Castle, Delaware
- Coordinates: 39°38′32.6″N 75°35′43.5″W

Tower
- Constructed: 1876
- Construction: Wood frame (first); Steel (current)
- Automated: 1964
- Height: 60 feet (18 m)
- Shape: Square tower (first); Skeletal tower (current)

Light
- First lit: 1964
- Deactivated: 1964
- Focal height: 37 feet (11 m) (first); 56 feet (17 m) (current)
- Characteristic: Iso G 2s

New Castle Range Front Lighthouse is a lighthouse in Delaware, United States, on the Delaware River near New Castle, Delaware

== History ==
The original New Castle Range lights were wooden towers built in 1876. The New Castle Range Rear Light was attached to the keeper's quarters while the New Castle Range Front Light was a free standing tower. The original front range light was demolished in 1964 when it was replaced by a steel skeletal tower. Both of the current skeletal towers remain an active aid to navigation and are not open to the public.
