= Biddle House (St. Georges, Delaware) =

Historic house in Delaware, US

- U.S. National Register of Historic Places
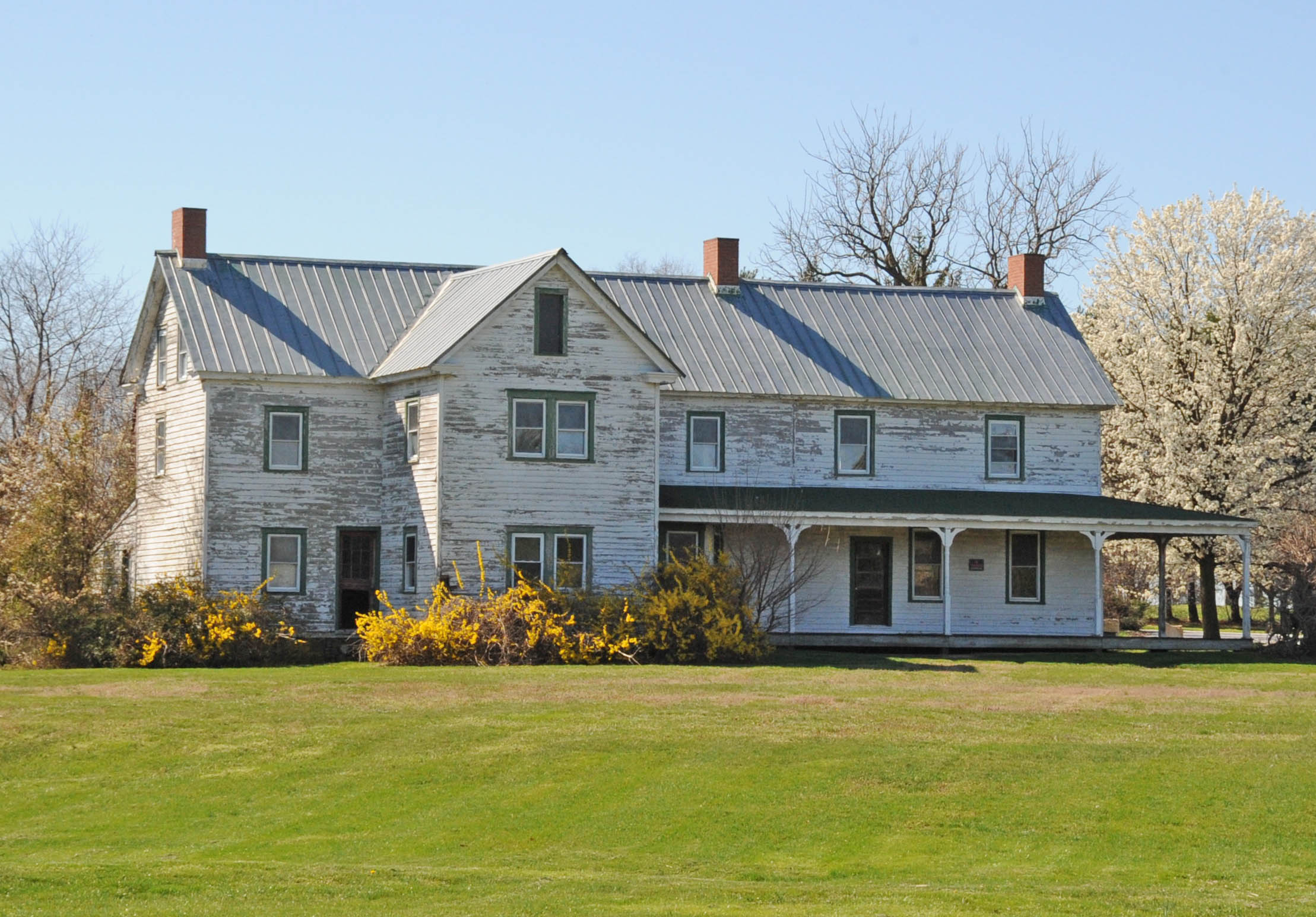

- Location within Delaware Location within the United States
- Location: 2120 DuPont Parkway, Biddles Corner, Delaware
- Coordinates: 39°31′25″N 75°38′52″W
- Area: 0.2 acres (0.081 ha)
- Built: c. 1780
- Architectural style: Federal, Plank house;side hall house
- NRHP reference No.: 78000908
- Added to NRHP: December 8, 1978

Biddle House, also known as the Vandergrift-Biddle House, is a historic home located near Port Penn and St. Georges in New Castle County, Delaware, United States. The house underwent five distinct periods of growth and in the process has grown from a one-room-plan plank house to an extended rambling two-story structure. The earliest section was built about 1780, with the first modification made in the early-19th century. It was later expanded during the Victorian era with wings.

It was listed on the National Register of Historic Places in 1978.

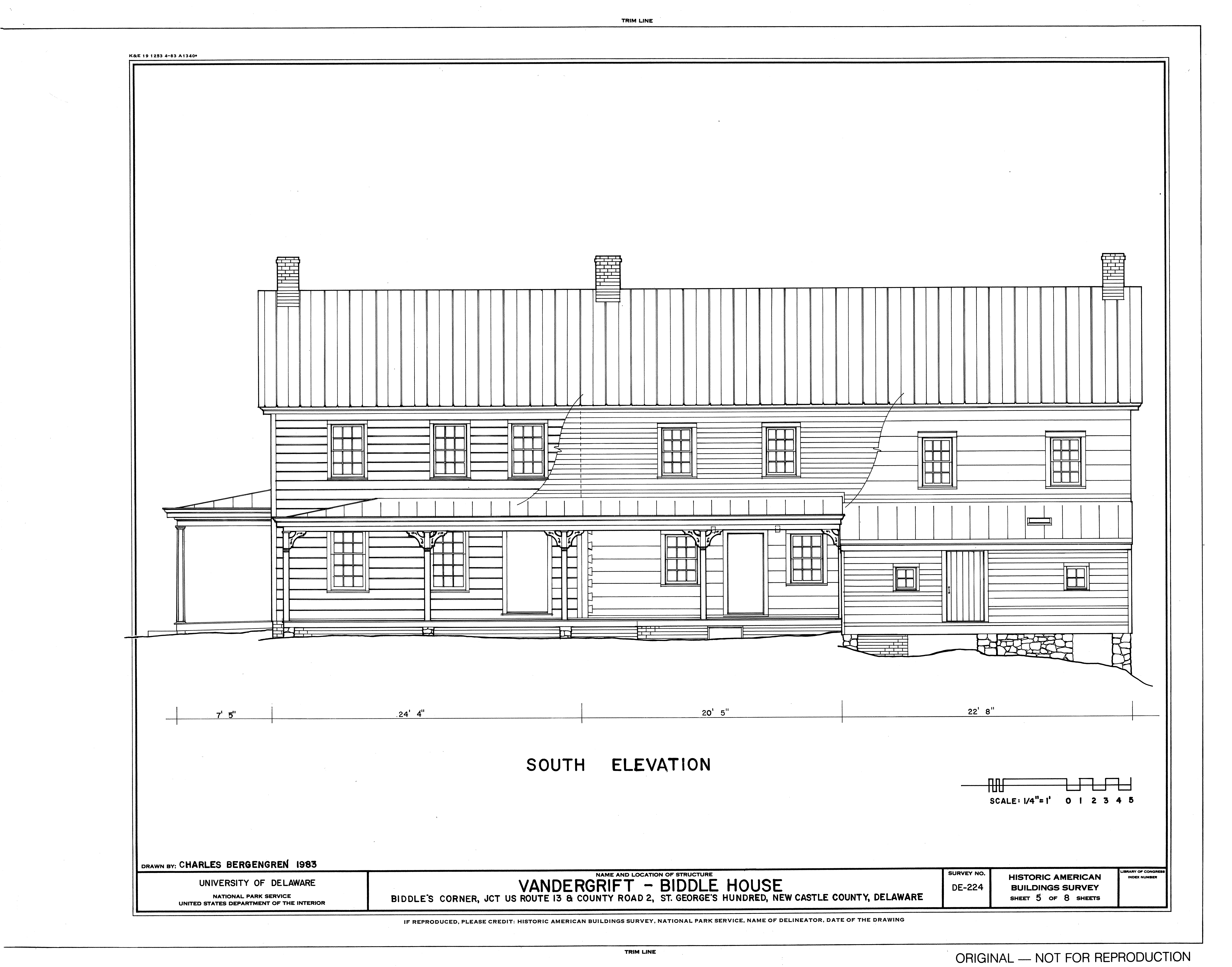
HABS documentation
