= Marcus Hook =

Marcus Hook may refer to:

- Marcus Hook, Pennsylvania, a borough in Delaware County, Pennsylvania, in the United States
- Marcus Hook (SEPTA station), a railroad station in Marcus Hook, Pennsylvania, in the United States
- Marcus Hook Range Front Light, a lighthouse in the Delaware River in Delaware in the United States
- Marcus Hook Range Rear Light, a lighthouse in the Delaware River in Delaware in the United States
