= Ashton Historic District (Port Penn, Delaware) =

Historic district in Delaware, US

- U.S. National Register of Historic Places
- U.S. Historic district
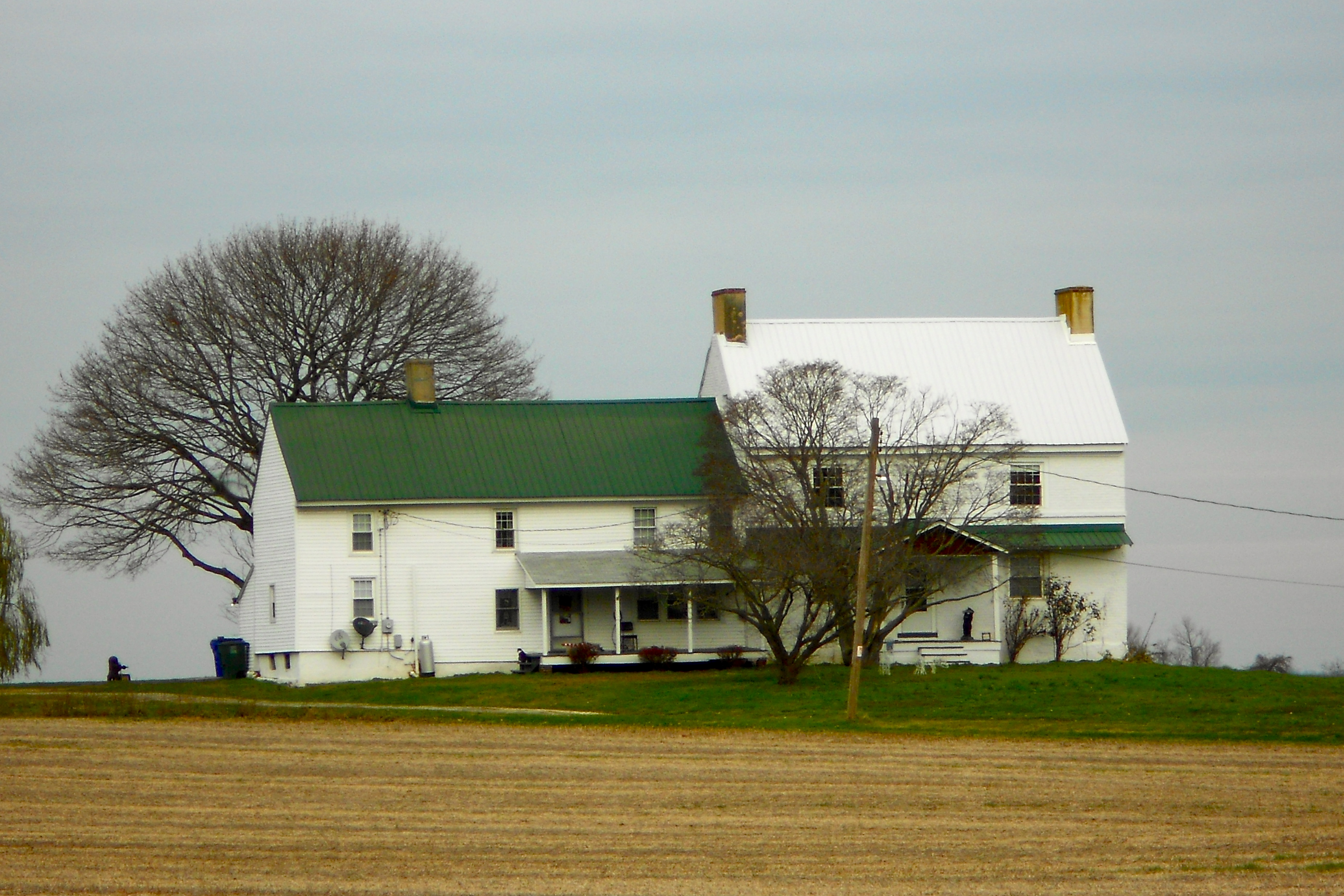
- John Ashton House, Ashton Historic District, December 2011

- Location within Delaware Location within the United States
- Location: North of Port Penn on Thormton Rd., near Port Penn, Delaware
- Coordinates: 39°31′52″N 75°35′03″W
- Area: 170 acres (69 ha)
- Built: 1700
- NRHP reference No.: 78000903
- Added to NRHP: November 15, 1978

Ashton Historic District is a national historic district located near Port Penn in New Castle County, Delaware, United States. It encompasses six contributing buildings associated with an original settler and his immediate descendants on early land grant in St. Georges Hundred. The three structures associated with the early occupation are the Robert Ashton House, the Joseph Ashton House, and the John Ashton House. The Robert Ashton House, probably the earliest of the group, is a frame, five-bay, single-pile, gambrel-roofed building with shed-roofed dormers. The Joseph Ashton House, consists of an early-18th-century two-story, three-bay, hall-and-parlor-plan brick structure with a late-18th or early-19th century brick wing. The John Ashton House, consists of a brick, early-18th century two-story, three-bay, hall-and-parlor-plan house with a frame wing.

It was listed on the National Register of Historic Places in 1978.
