= Little Creek Hundred Rural Historic District =

Historic district in Delaware, United States

- U.S. National Register of Historic Places
- U.S. Historic district
- Location within Delaware Location within the United States
- Location: Delaware Route 9, near Little Creek, Delaware
- Coordinates: 39°10′47″N 75°28′31″W
- Area: 2,500 acres (1,000 ha)
- Architect: Multiple
- Architectural style: Italianate
- NRHP reference No.: 84000286
- Added to NRHP: November 7, 1984

Little Creek Hundred Rural Historic District is a national historic district located near Little Creek, Kent County, Delaware. It encompasses 21 contributing buildings, 1 contributing site, and 1 contributing structure in a rural area near Little Creek. It consists of 11 distinct adjoining farm complexes, an octagonal school house and the Little Creek Quaker Meeting house and cemetery. Eight of the major buildings are built of brick, three are frame, and two are stone.

It was listed on the National Register of Historic Places in 1984.
