= Aerodrome beacon =

Beacon installed at an airport

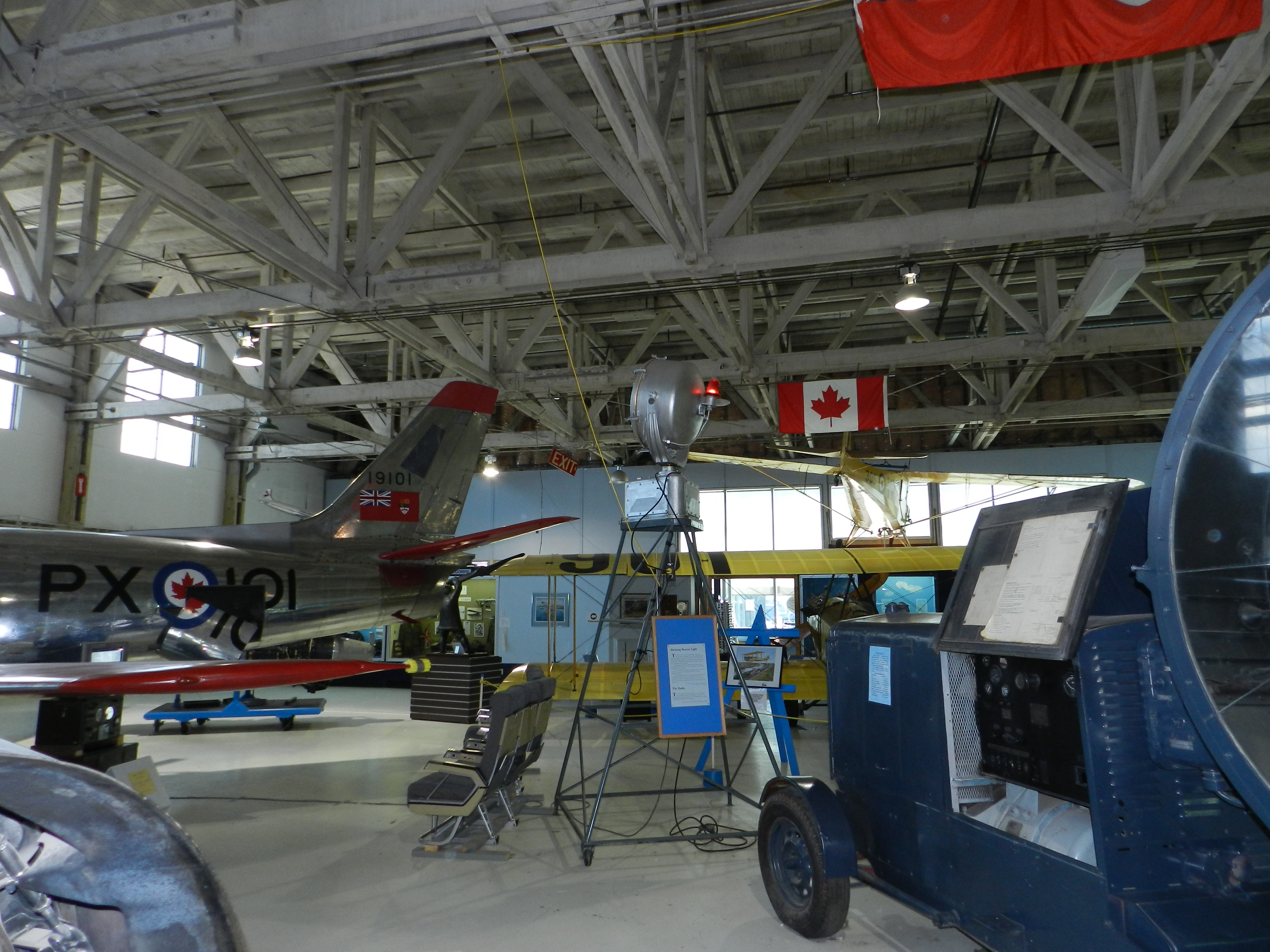
A portable rotating beacon on display at the Alberta Aviation Museum

An aerodrome beacon, airport beacon, rotating beacon or aeronautical beacon is a beacon installed at an airport or aerodrome to indicate its location to aircraft pilots at night.

An aerodrome beacon is mounted on top of a towering structure, often a control tower, above other buildings of the airport. It produces flashes similar to that of a lighthouse.

Airport and heliport beacons are designed in such a way to make them most effective from one to ten degrees above the horizon; however, they can be seen well above and below this peak spread. The beacon may be an omnidirectional flashing xenon strobe, or it may be an aerobeacon rotating at a constant speed which produces the visual effect of flashes at regular intervals. Flashes may be of one, two, or three alternating colors.

== In the United States ==
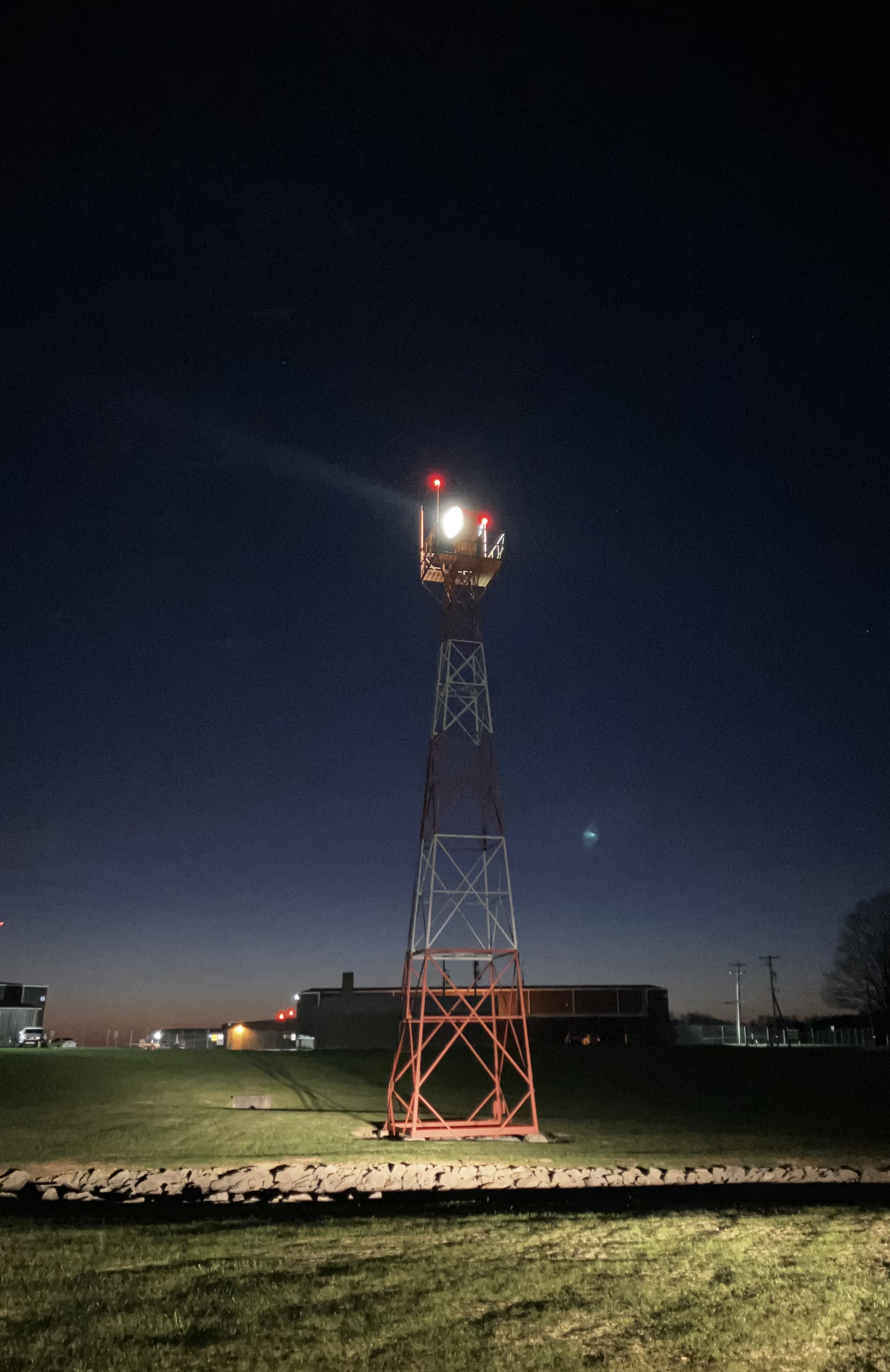
An active beacon at Pittsburgh-Butler Regional Airport, Pennsylvania.

In the United States, the Federal Aviation Administration (FAA) has established the following rules for airport beacons:

Flashing rates

1. 24 to 30 per minute for beacons marking airports, landmarks, and points on federal airways
2. 30 to 45 per minute for beacons marking heliports

Color combinations

1. White and green — lighted land airport
2. Green alone* — lighted land airport
3. White and yellow — lighted water airport
4. Yellow alone* — lighted water airport
5. Green, yellow, and white — lighted heliport
6. White, white, green** — military airport
7. White, green, amber — hospital and/or emergency services heliport

*Green alone or yellow alone is used only in connection with a white-and-green or white-and-yellow beacon display, respectively.

**Military airport beacons flash alternately white and green, but are differentiated from civil beacons by two quick white flashes between the green flashes.

In Class B, C, D, and E surface areas, operation of the airport beacon between sunrise and sunset often indicates that the ground visibility is less than 3 miles and/or the ceiling is less than 1,000 feet. This is true particularly at locations where beacon controls are available to air traffic control personnel; however there is no regulation requiring daytime operation.

At some locations with operating control towers, ATC personnel turn the beacon on or off with controls in the tower. At many airports the airport beacon is turned on by a photoelectric cell or time clocks, and ATC personnel cannot control them.

== In Canada ==
In Canada, the regulations are different. Lighted aerodromes are equipped with white single flash beacons operating at a frequency of 20 to 30 flashes per minute. Heliports with beacons exhibit the morse letter H (4 short flashes) at a rate of 3 to 4 groups per minute.

== See also ==
- Index of aviation articles
- Instrument landing system, for the radio-frequency beacons used to locate aircraft.
