= Christiana North Jetty Light =

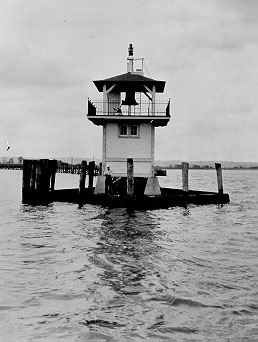
- USCG photograph of the Christiana North Jetty Light
- Location: Wilmington, Delaware
- Coordinates: 39.71914°N 75.51084°W

Tower
- Constructed: 1884
- Foundation: wooden piles
- Construction: wooden tower
- Shape: square tower with balcony, bell and light on the roof

Light
- First lit: 1884
- Deactivated: 1909
- Characteristic: F W (1884); F R (1901)

Christiana North Jetty Lighthouse was a lighthouse in Delaware, United States, at the end of jetty at the mouth of the Christina River, near Wilmington, Delaware.

== History ==
Christiana North Jetty Lighthouse was built in 1884. It was discontinued in 1909 when the new Bellevue Range Lights went into operation, but the dwelling was used for the keeper of the Bellevue Range Lights until 1937. The lighthouse and dwelling were demolished in 1939.

== See also ==
- List of lighthouses in Delaware
- List of lighthouses in the United States
