= Port Mahon (Delaware) =

Unincorporated community in Delaware, United States

- Location within Delaware Location within the United States
- Coordinates: 39°11′7″N 75°24′4″W
- Country: United States
- State: Delaware
- County: Kent
- Elevation: 0 ft (0 m)
- Time zone: UTC-5 (Eastern (EST))
  - Summer (DST): UTC-4 (EDT)
- Area code: 302
- GNIS feature ID: 214476

Port Mahon was a port in Kent County, Delaware, United States located along the Delaware Bay at the eastern end of Port Mahon Road, northeast of Little Creek. and served as a port for the town. It is also located nearby Leipsic. Named for the Spanish city, Mahón, it is locally pronounced "MAY-hon" (not Mah-HONE). It functions as public fishing piers.

== See also ==
- Mahon River Light
- Little Creek Wildlife Area
- Bombay Hook National Wildlife Refuge
