= Jonathan Woodley House =

Historic house in Delaware, US

- U.S. National Register of Historic Places
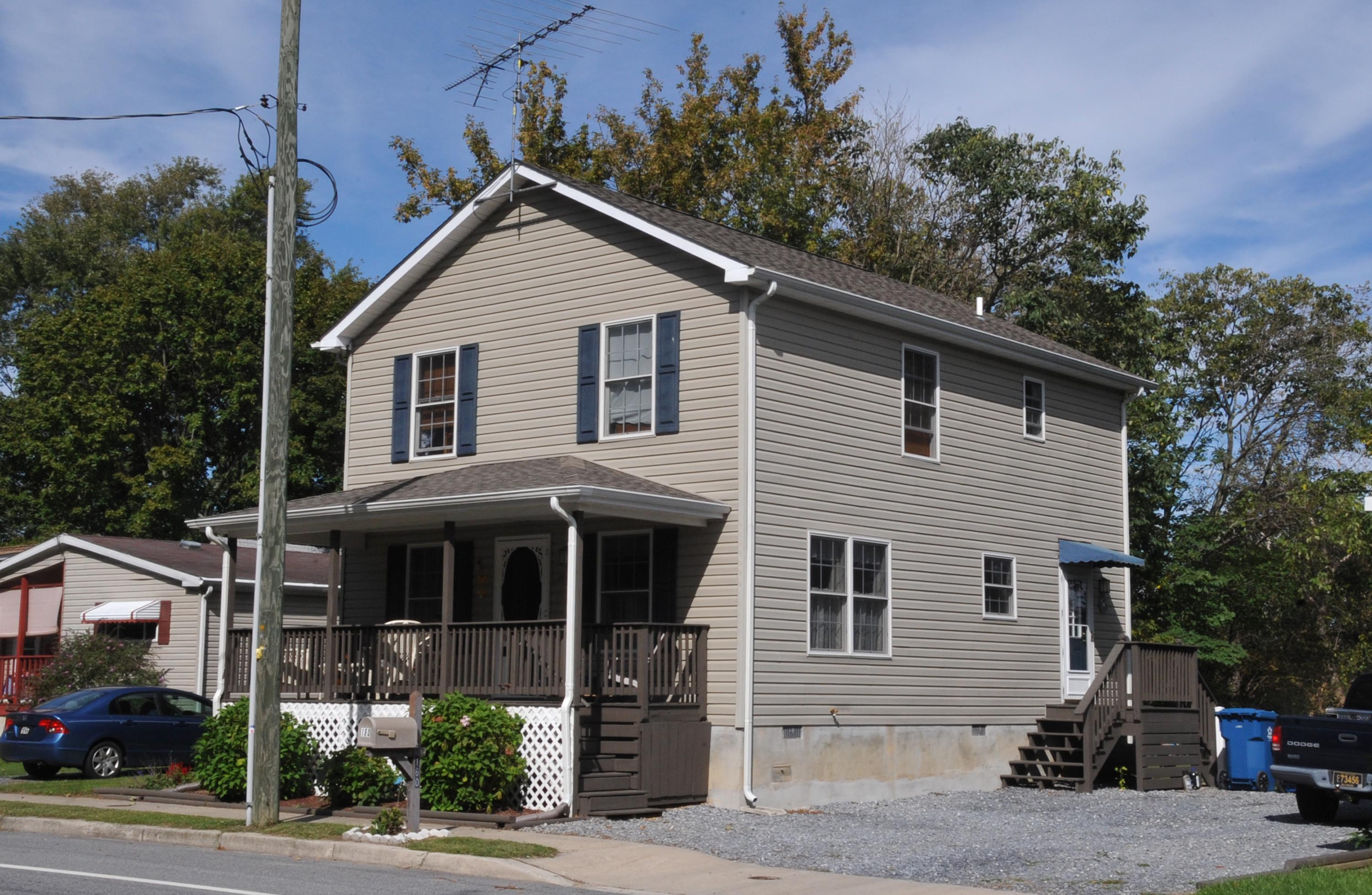
- Jonathan Woodley House, September 2012

- Location within Delaware Location within the United States
- Location: Main St., Little Creek, Delaware
- Coordinates: 39°9′46″N 75°26′48″W
- Area: 0.3 acres (0.12 ha)
- Architectural style: Greek Revival
- MPS: Leipsic and Little Creek MRA
- NRHP reference No.: 82002318
- Added to NRHP: May 24, 1982

Jonathan Woodley House is a historic home located at Little Creek, Delaware, United States. It dates to the mid-19th century, and is a two-story, three-bay, vernacular frame and weatherboard dwelling with a 1 1/2-story rear wing. The front doorway exhibits Greek Revival style influences. The house has been considerably altered since its listing.

It was listed on the National Register of Historic Places in 1982.
