= Little Creek Methodist Church =

Historic church in Delaware, United States

- U.S. National Register of Historic Places
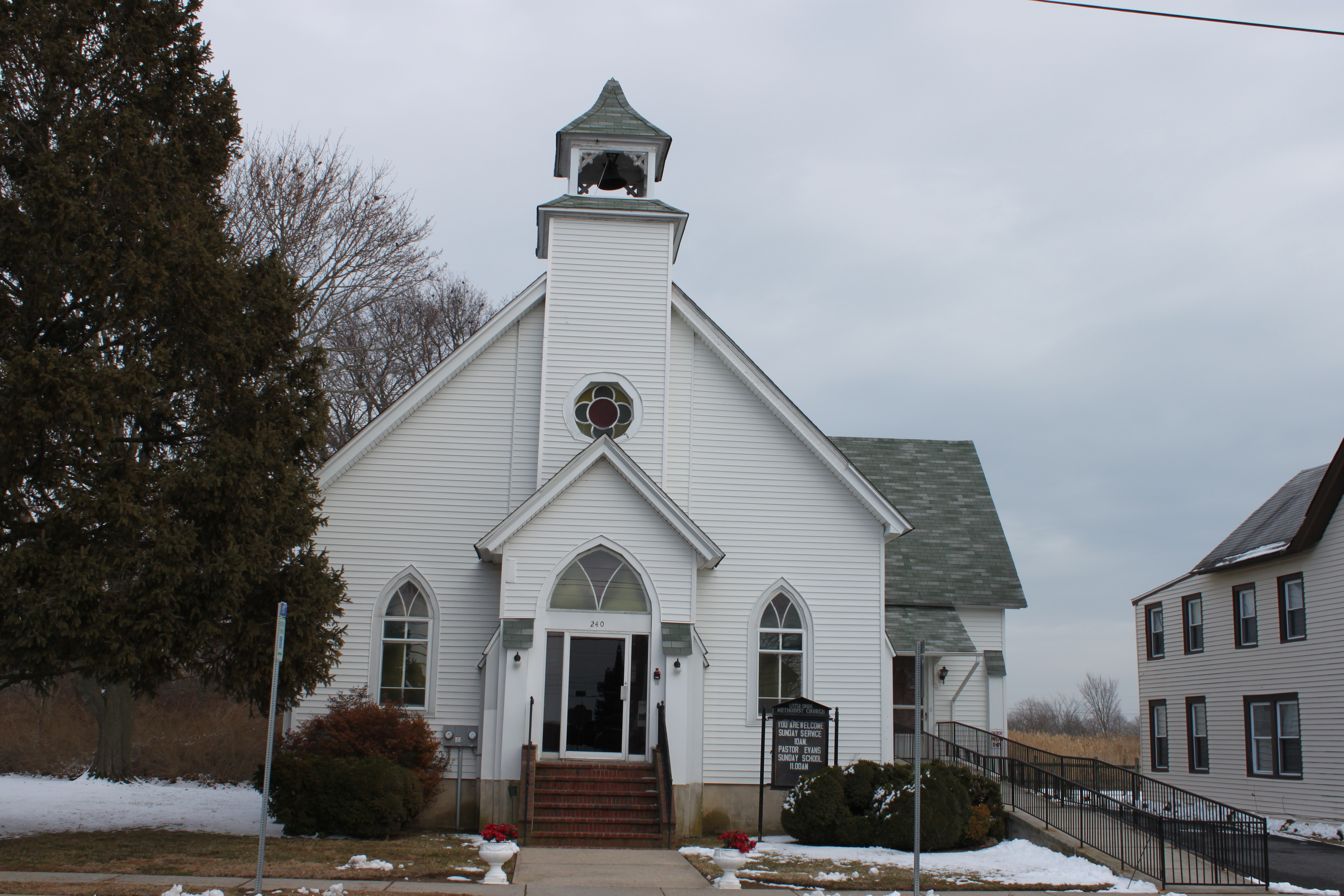
- Little Creek Methodist Church, January 2011

- Location within Delaware Location within the United States
- Location: Main St., Little Creek, Delaware
- Coordinates: 39°9′49″N 75°26′49″W
- Area: 0.3 acres (0.12 ha)
- Built: 1883
- Architectural style: Gothic Revival
- MPS: Leipsic and Little Creek MRA
- NRHP reference No.: 82002316
- Added to NRHP: May 24, 1982

Little Creek Methodist Church is a historic Methodist church located on Main Street in Little Creek, Kent County, Delaware. It was built in 1883, and is an ell-shaped, one-story frame building in the Late Gothic Revival style. It has a gable roof and square bell tower topped with a tapered, pyramidal cupola housing the bell. The bell tower has a circular, recessed, stained glass "rose" window.

It was added to the National Register of Historic Places in 1982.
