= Cherry Island Range Rear Light =

Lighthouse in Delaware, United States

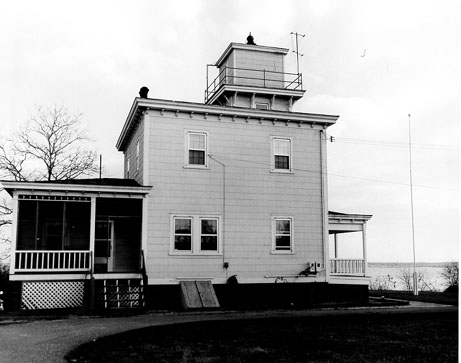
- Cherry Island Range Rear Light in 1963 (by USCG)
- Location: Bellefonte; Delaware; United States
- Coordinates: 39.762077°N 75.489736°W

Tower
- Constructed: 1880 (first)
- Foundation: concrete base (current)
- Construction: metal skeletal tower (current) wooden tower (first)
- Automated: 1970's
- Height: 35 feet (11 m) (current)
- Shape: square skeletal tower with light (current) square tower atop a 2-story keeper's house (first)
- Operator: United States Coast Guard

Light
- First lit: 1970's (current)
- Deactivated: 1970's (first)
- Focal height: 120 feet (37 m) (current)
- Lens: n/a
- Characteristic: F R

Cherry Island Range Rear Light is a lighthouse in Wilmington, Delaware, United States, on the Delaware River, just north of the Christina River, Delaware. It is 1,456 yards (1,331 m) behind Cherry Island Range Front Light. The present light is a skeletal tower supporting a red light.

== Head keepers ==
- John A. Patterson 1880 – 1910
- Lawson Holland 1910 – 1915
- Charles E. Marshall 1919 – 1921
- Julian Bacon 1930 – 1933
- William H. Johnson 1938 – 1941

== See also ==
- List of lighthouses in Delaware
- List of lighthouses in the United States
