= Old Stone Tavern (Little Creek, Delaware) =

Historic house in Delaware, United States

- U.S. National Register of Historic Places
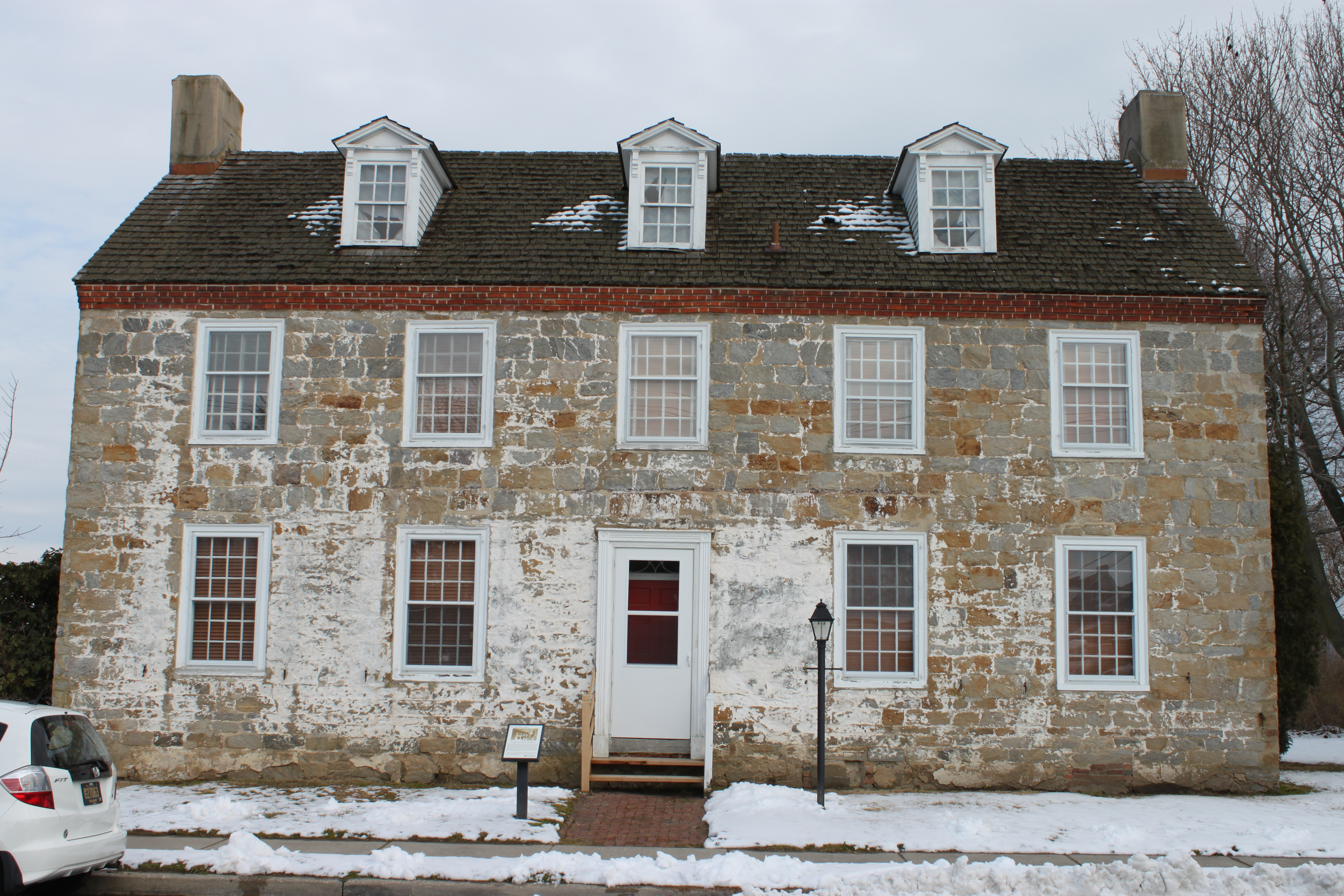
- Old Stone Tavern, January 2011

- Location within Delaware Location within the United States
- Location: Main St., Little Creek, Delaware
- Coordinates: 39°9′51″N 75°26′51″W
- Area: 2 acres (0.81 ha)
- Built: c. 1829
- Architectural style: Greek Revival
- MPS: Leipsic and Little Creek MRA
- NRHP reference No.: 73000499
- Added to NRHP: July 2, 1973

Old Stone Tavern, also known as The Nowell House, The Bell House, and The Old Stone House, is a historic home located at Little Creek, Kent County, Delaware. The main section was built about 1829, and is a two-story, five-bay, stone Georgian-style structure. It has a gable roof with brick cornice and dormers. A 1 1/2-story brick kitchen wing is attached. It was thought to have been a tavern by the local community, but records have shown that it was always a dwelling house.

It was listed on the National Register of Historic Places in 1973.
