= Baker Shoal Range Rear Light =

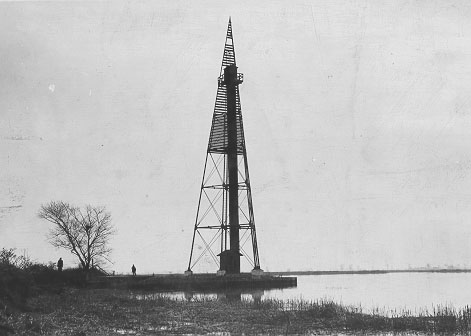
- Rear range light ca. 1933 (USCG photo)
- Location: Port Penn, Delaware, United States
- Coordinates: 39°32′30″N 75°34′12″W

Tower
- Constructed: 1896
- Foundation: wooden piles
- Construction: cast iron skeletal tower
- Height: 110 ft (34 m)
- Shape: triangular pyramidal tower with light
- Markings: black tower and daymark
- Operator: United States Coast Guard

Light
- Focal height: 110 ft (34 m)
- Characteristic: F G
- Active light
- First lit: 1904
- Focal height: 20 m (66 ft)
- Characteristic: Iso W 6s

Passing light
- Focal height: 18 ft (5.5 m)
- Characteristic: Fl W 4s

Baker Shoal Range Rear Lighthouse is a lighthouse in Delaware, United States, on the Delaware River, near Port Penn.

== History ==
Baker Shoal Range Rear Lighthouse originally served as the Port Penn-Reedy Island Range Rear Light in Port Penn. It became the Baker Shoal Range Rear Light in 1904 when the old range was discontinued due to the channel moving. It is an active aid to navigation.

== Head keepers ==
- Willard H. Hall 1904 – 1906
- Benjamin Burton 1906
- Harry F. Hann 1906 – 1908
- Harry E. Spencer Sr. 1908 – 1913
- William Harrington 1913 – 1915
- Fred C. Hill 1917 – 1924

== See also ==
- List of lighthouses in Delaware
- List of lighthouses in the United States
