= Mahon River Light =

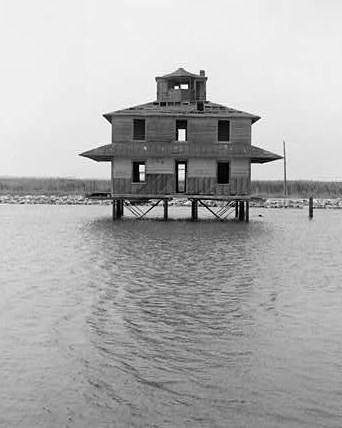
- Location: Port Mahon, Delaware
- Coordinates: 39°11′06″N 75°24′04″W

Tower
- Constructed: 1903
- Construction: Steel skeletal tower
- Height: 37 feet (11 m)
- Shape: Skeletal tower
- Heritage: National Register of Historic Places listed place

Light
- First lit: 1955
- Deactivated: 1955
- Focal height: 37 feet (11 m)
- Lens: Fresnel lens
- Range: 7 nmi (13 km; 8.1 mi)
- Characteristic: white flash every 4 s
- Port Mahon Lighthouse
- U.S. National Register of Historic Places
- Location within Delaware Location within the United States
- Nearest city: Little Creek, Delaware
- Coordinates: 39°11′5″N 75°24′4″W
- Built: 1902-1903
- NRHP reference No.: 79000624
- Added to NRHP: October 25, 1979

Mahon River Lighthouse is a U.S. lighthouse in Port Mahon, Delaware, on the west side of the mouth of the Delaware River.

== History ==
The original Mahon River Lighthouse built in 1903 and was a 2-story wood keeper's house with an octagonal lantern centered on the roof. It was discontinued in 1955, the same year as the current steel skeletal tower was lit. The 1903 lighthouse burned accidentally in 1984. The clubhouse of the Jonathan's Landing Golf Course in Magnolia was built as a replica of the original lighthouse. The current tower is an active aid to navigation and not open to the public.

It was listed on the National Register of Historic Places in 1979.

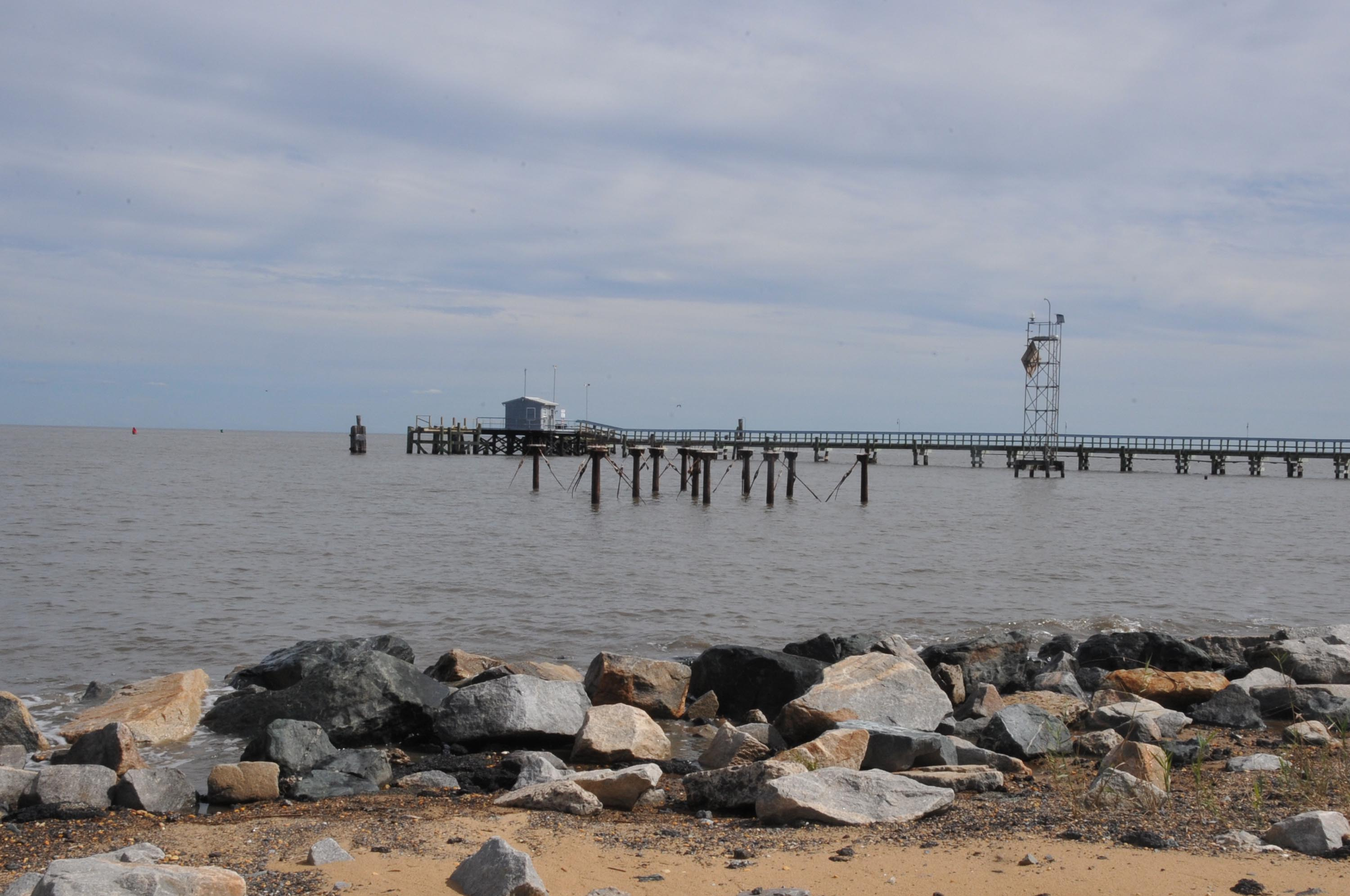
The pilings are all that remain of the lighthouse
