= Cherbourg Round Barn =

Historic place near Little Creek, Delaware, United States

- U.S. National Register of Historic Places
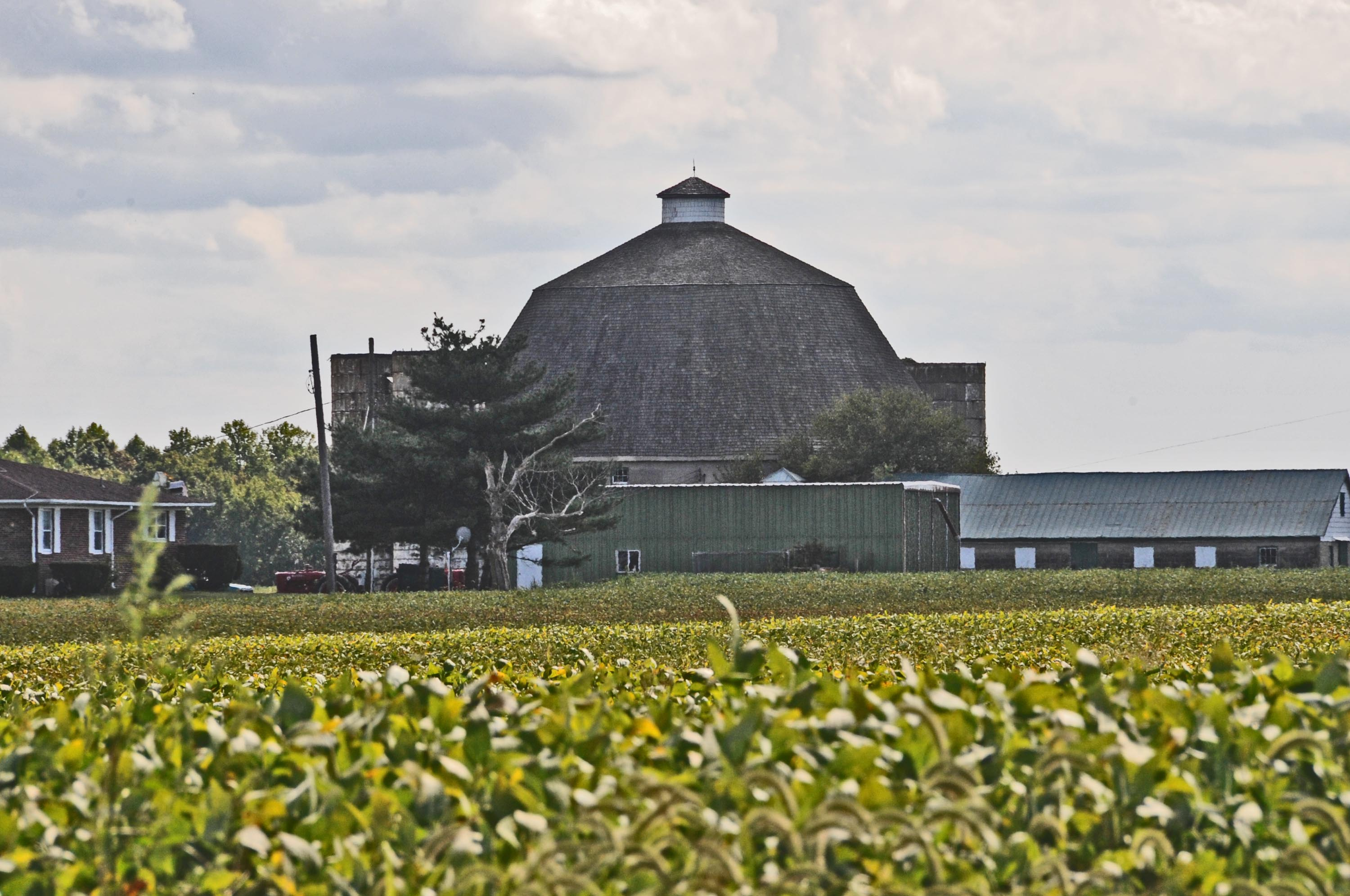

- Location within Delaware Location within the United States
- Nearest city: Little Creek, Delaware
- Coordinates: 39°9′4″N 75°27′27″W
- Area: 0.2 acres (0.081 ha)
- Built: 1918
- Architectural style: Round Barn
- NRHP reference No.: 78000888
- Added to NRHP: December 22, 1978

The Cherbourg Round Barn near Little Creek, Delaware is a round barn that was built in 1918. It was listed on the National Register of Historic Places in 1978. Now destroyed, its walls were made of poured concrete.
