= New Castle Range Rear Light =

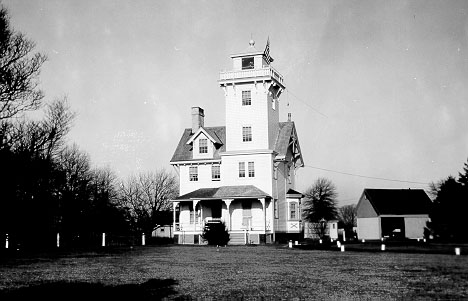
- the tower in 1933
- Location: Adjacent to 718 Grantham Ln, New Castle, Delaware
- Coordinates: 39°38′53.5″N 75°35′56.4″W

Tower
- Constructed: 1876
- Construction: Wood frame (first); Steel (current)
- Automated: 1953
- Height: 90 feet (27 m)
- Shape: house with tower on roof (first); Skeletal tower (current)

Light
- First lit: 1953
- Deactivated: 1953
- Focal height: 110 feet (34 m)
- Characteristic: continuous green light

The New Castle Range Rear Light is a lighthouse in Delaware, United States, on the Delaware River near New Castle, Delaware.

== History ==
This range was constructed in 1876 to mark the main channel past Pea Patch Island and Bulkhead Shoal; it took its name from the town, somewhat to the northeast of the lights. The rear tower was integral to its dwelling, a two-story frame house, and was located on a 1-acre plot half a mile from the front light. It was supplanted by a steel skeleton tower in 1953, but the original house remained standing until deliberately burned in 1982 after falling into disrepair and a previous fire in 1975.
