= Little Creek, Delaware =

- Town
- Logo

- Location of Little Creek in Kent County, Delaware.

- Location within the state of Delaware Little Creek (the United States)
- Coordinates: 39°10′01″N 75°26′54″W
- Country: United States
- State: Delaware
- County: Kent

Area
  - Total: 0.10 sq mi (0.26 km^{2})
  - Land: 0.10 sq mi (0.26 km^{2})
  - Water: 0 sq mi (0.00 km^{2})
- Elevation: 7 ft (2.1 m)

Population (2020)
  - Total: 195
  - Density: 1,963.4/sq mi (758.09/km^{2})
- Time zone: UTC−5 (Eastern (EST))
  - Summer (DST): UTC−4 (EDT)
- ZIP code: 19961
- Area code: 302
- FIPS code: 10-42870
- GNIS feature ID: 214231
- Website: littlecreek.delaware.gov

Little Creek is a town in Kent County, Delaware, United States. It is part of the Dover metropolitan statistical area. The population was 195 in 2020.

== History ==
John Woolman attended Quaker meeting at Little Creek in late summer 1748 during a visit to the Southern Counties of Delaware.

The Cherbourg Round Barn, Little Creek Hundred Rural Historic District, Little Creek Methodist Church, Old Stone Tavern, Port Mahon Lighthouse, Elizabeth Stubbs House, and Jonathan Woodley House are listed on the National Register of Historic Places.

== Geography ==
Little Creek is located at 39°10′01″N 75°26′54″W (39.1670570, –75.4482541).

According to the United States Census Bureau, the town has a total area of 0.1 square miles (0.26 km^{2}), all land.

== Demographics ==
Historical population
Census	Pop.	Note	%±
1890	285		—
1900	259		−9.1%
1910	285		10.0%
1920	156		−45.3%
1930	223		42.9%
1940	242		8.5%
1950	266		9.9%
1960	306		15.0%
1970	215		−29.7%
1980	230		7.0%
1990	167		−27.4%
2000	195		16.8%
2010	224		14.9%
2020	195		−12.9%
U.S. Decennial Census

At the 2000 census there were 195 people, 67 households, and 49 families living in the town. The population density was 1,780.5 inhabitants per square mile (687.5/km^{2}). There were 74 housing units at an average density of 675.7 units per square mile (260.9 units/km^{2}). The racial makeup of the town was 91.28% White, 6.67% African American, 0.51% Native American, 0.51% from other races, and 1.03% from two or more races. Hispanic or Latino of any race were 3.59%.

Of the 67 households 40.3% had children under the age of 18 living with them, 46.3% were married couples living together, 14.9% had a female householder with no husband present, and 25.4% were non-families. 20.9% of households were one person and 13.4% were one person aged 65 or older. The average household size was 2.91 and the average family size was 3.32.

The age distribution was 33.8% under the age of 18, 5.6% from 18 to 24, 29.2% from 25 to 44, 14.9% from 45 to 64, and 16.4% 65 or older. The median age was 34 years. For every 100 females, there were 87.5 males. For every 100 females age 18 and over, there were 89.7 males.

The median household income was $39,375 and the median family income was $41,563. Males had a median income of $27,250 versus $25,000 for females. The per capita income for the town was $13,418. About 7.7% of families and 18.8% of the population were below the poverty line, including 26.5% of those under the age of eighteen and none of those sixty five or over.

== Education ==
It is in the Capital School District. Dover High School is the comprehensive high school of the district.

== Infrastructure ==
=== Transportation ===
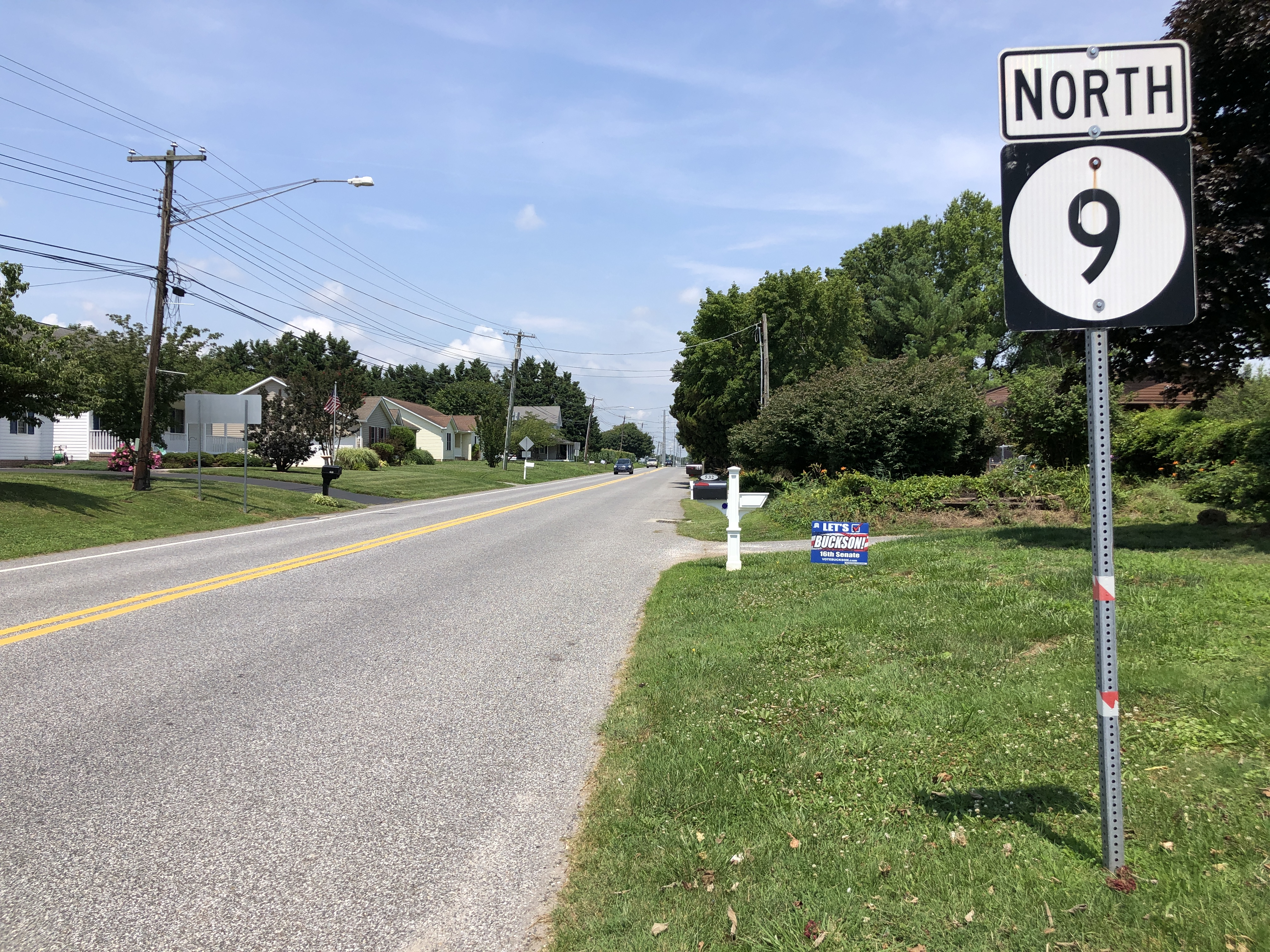
DE 9 northbound in Little Creek

Delaware Route 9, a scenic route running near the Delaware Bay, passes north–south through Little Creek on Main Street and heads south toward an interchange with Delaware Route 1 near Dover Air Force Base and north toward Leipsic. Delaware Route 8 (North Little Creek Road) and South Little Creek Road intersect DE 9 on either end of Little Creek and head west toward Dover.

=== Utilities ===
The City of Dover Electric Department provides electricity to Little Creek. Chesapeake Utilities provides natural gas to the town.
