= Liston Range Front Light =

Lighthouse in Delaware, United States

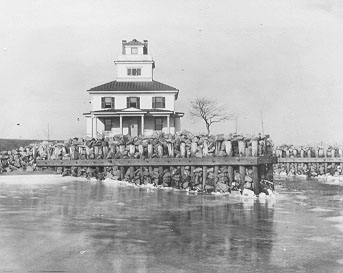
- Location: New Castle County, United States
- Coordinates: 39°28′57.3″N 75°35′30.0″W

Tower
- Constructed: 1906
- Automated: 1976
- Height: 45 feet (14 m)
- Heritage: National Register of Historic Places listed place

Light
- First lit: 1953
- Focal height: 45 feet (14 m)
- Lens: Second order Fresnel lens
- Characteristic: white light, 3 s on, 3 s off
- Liston Range Front Lighthouse
- U.S. National Register of Historic Places
- Location within Delaware Location within the United States
- Location: 1600 Belts Rd., Bay View Beach, Delaware
- Architect: Flagler, Maj. C.A.F.; Warner and Blair
- Architectural style: Colonial Revival
- NRHP reference No.: 03001386
- Added to NRHP: January 14, 2004

Liston Range Front Lighthouse is a lighthouse in Delaware, United States, on the Delaware River. It is a range light, paired with the Liston Range Rear Light, to create the Liston Range.

== History ==
Liston Range Front Lighthouse was built in 1906. It was a 3-story wood keeper's house with a square wood cupola on top and had a second order Fresnel lens.

It was added to the National Register of Historic Places in 2004.
