= Mondamon Farm =

Historic farm in Delaware, US

- U.S. National Register of Historic Places
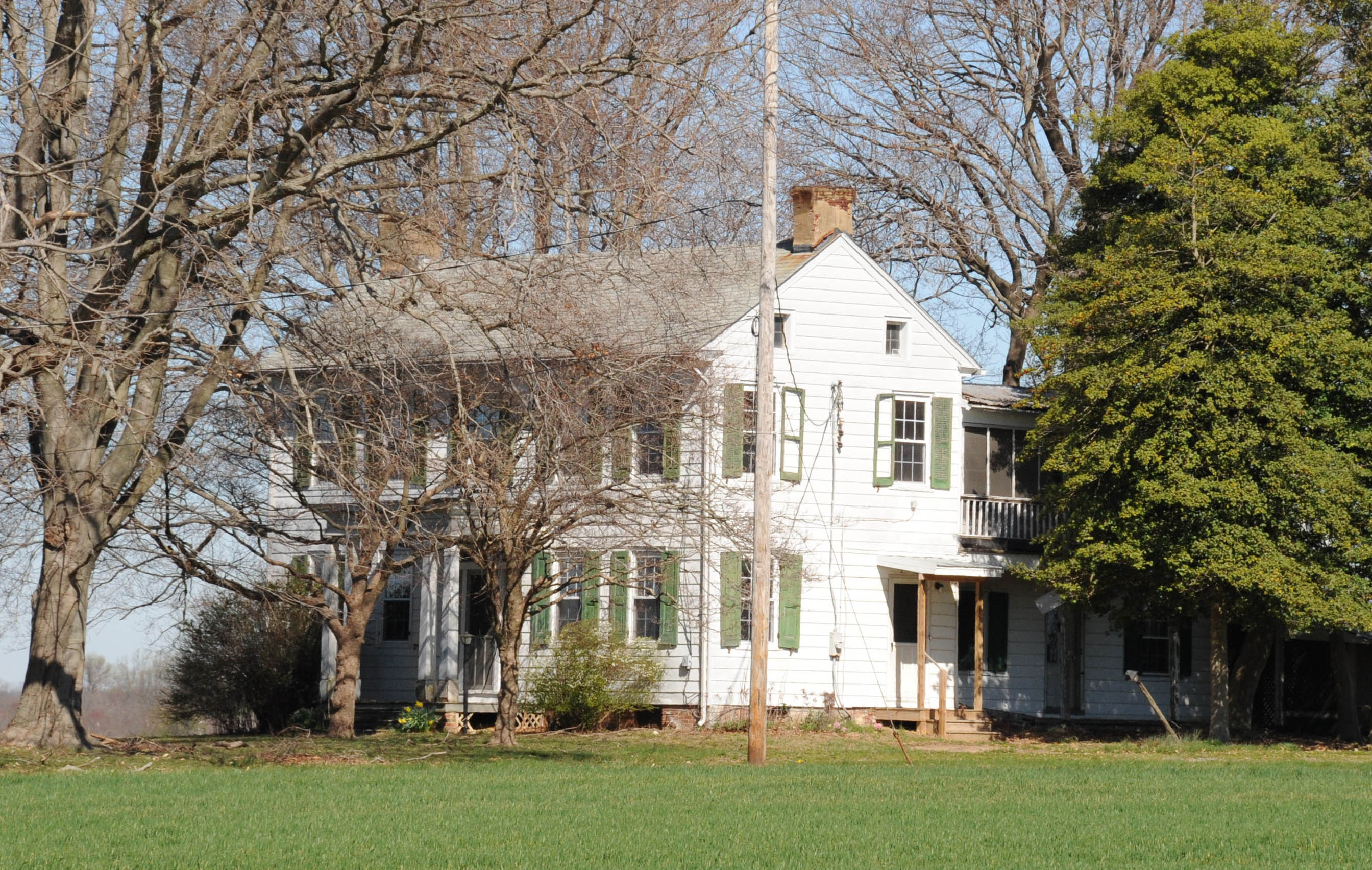

- Location within Delaware Location within the United States
- Location: 381 Port Penn Rd. in St. Georges Hundred, near Odessa, Delaware
- Coordinates: 39.524576°N 75.640926°W
- Area: 10 acres (4.0 ha)
- Built: c. 1840
- MPS: Rebuilding St. Georges Hundred 1850-1880 TR
- NRHP reference No.: 85003524
- Added to NRHP: November 19, 1985

Mondamon Farm is a historic home and farm complex located near Odessa in New Castle County, Delaware, United States. The original section was built about 1840. It is a 2 1/2-story, five-bay frame dwelling with a two-bay, two-story shed roof service ell. Also on the property is a frame granary, barn, and 19th-century earthfast hay barrack.

It was listed on the National Register of Historic Places in 1985.

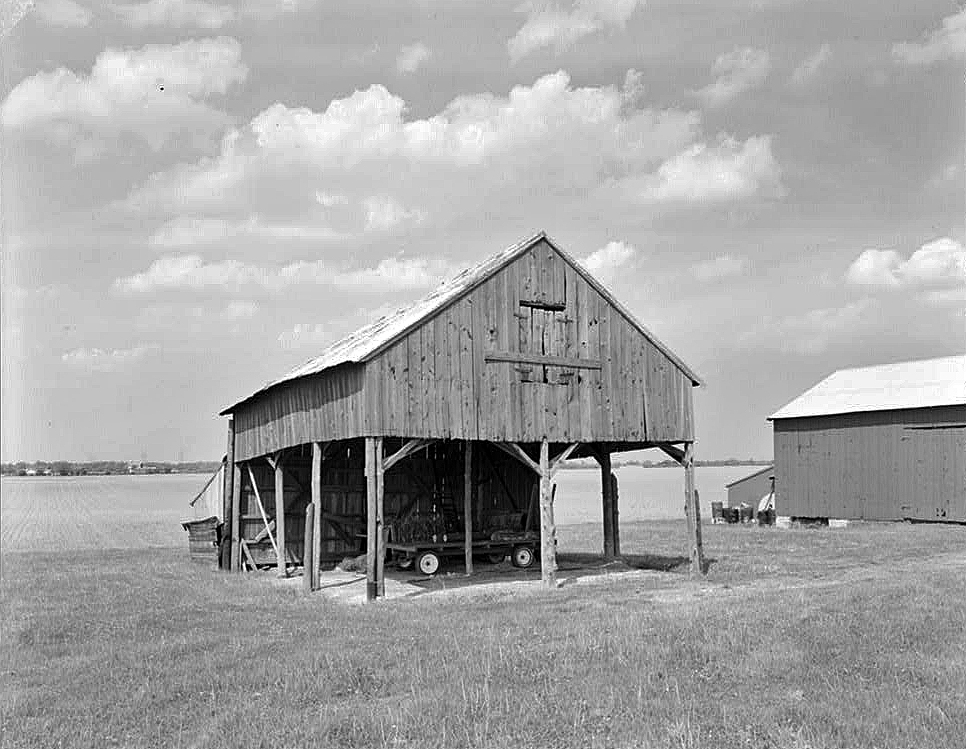
The hay barracks at Mondamon Farm in 1982
