= Elizabeth Stubbs House =

Historic house in Delaware, United States

- U.S. National Register of Historic Places
- Location within Delaware Location within the United States
- Location: Main St., Little Creek, Delaware
- Coordinates: 39°9′48″N 75°26′51″W
- Area: 0.2 acres (0.081 ha)
- Built: 1866
- Architectural style: Second Empire
- MPS: Leipsic and Little Creek MRA
- NRHP reference No.: 82002317
- Added to NRHP: May 24, 1982

Elizabeth Stubbs House is a historic home located at Little Creek, Kent County, Delaware. It was built about 1866, and is a two-story, three-bay, frame-and-weatherboard dwelling with rear wings. It has a grey slate, concave, mansard roof with gable dormers. It features oversized dentil moldings on the roof cornice and on the door and window lintels, cut out scrolls on the dormers, and patterned square and hexagonal slate roof tiles.

It was listed on the National Register of Historic Places in 1982.
