= Liston Range Rear Light =

Lighthouse in Delaware, United States

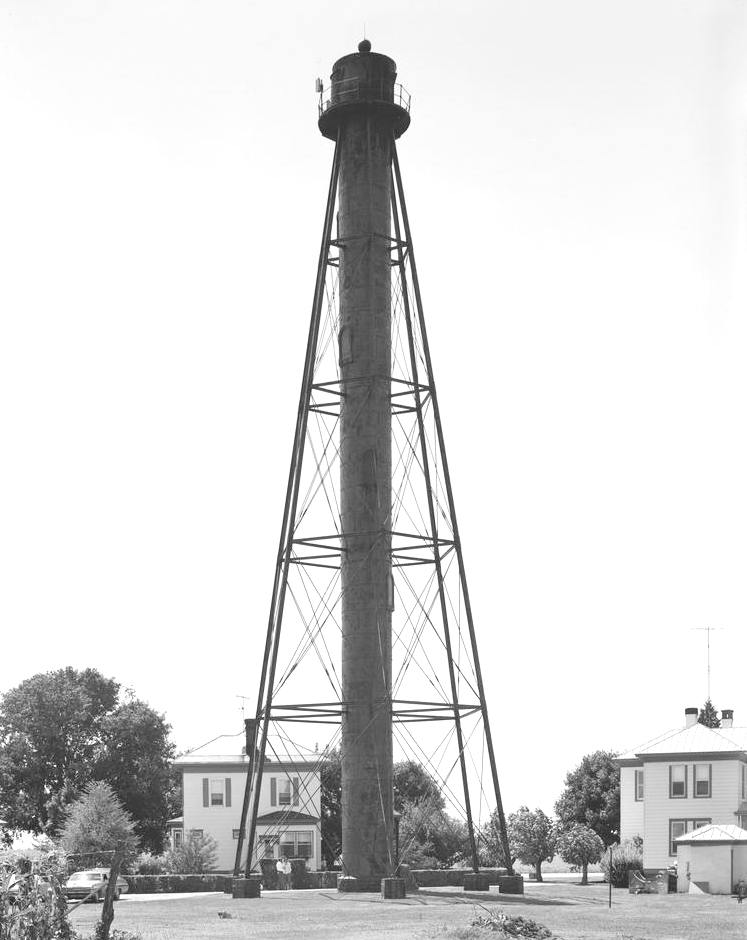
- Location: Delaware River, Delaware
- Coordinates: 39°31′25.7″N 75°38′22.6″W

Tower
- Constructed: 1906
- Automated: 1976
- Height: 120 feet (37 m)
- Shape: Pyramidal Skeletal Tower with cylinder
- Heritage: National Register of Historic Places listed place

Light
- First lit: 1877
- Focal height: 54 m (177 ft)
- Lens: Second order Fresnel lens
- Characteristic: F W
- Liston Ranger Rear Light Station
- U.S. National Register of Historic Places
- U.S. Historic district
- Location within Delaware Location within the United States
- Nearest city: Port Penn, Delaware
- Area: 1.7 acres (0.69 ha)
- Built: 1877
- Architect: Lighthouse Establishment
- Architectural style: Greek Revival
- NRHP reference No.: 78000905
- Added to NRHP: November 15, 1978

Liston Range Rear Lighthouse is a lighthouse in Delaware, United States, on the Delaware River. The 120 feet (37 m) wrought iron tower was made by the Kellogg Bridge Company of Buffalo, New York. The light was built several miles to the east of its present location in 1876–1877, and was moved in 1906. The light was listed on the National Register of Historic Places in 1978. It is the tallest lighthouse in Delaware.

== Overview ==
The light operates as one of a pair of lights, or a range, which, when aligned, indicates to the navigator that a vessel navigating by these lights is on the correct course. Together with the Liston Range Front Light, they form the Liston Range. The front range light is lower in elevation, while the rear is tall, so that the lights are superimposed when on the correct bearing.

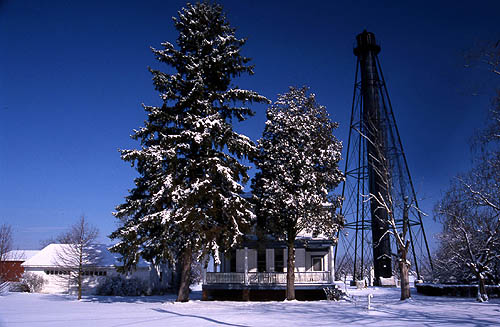
The lighthouse complex in 1993

The Liston Rear Range Light was one of four lights forming a complex known as Liston's Tree Range. One set of two lights was located in New Jersey, forming the Finn's Point Range Lights, with the other pair in Delaware became the Port Penn Range Lights. The front lights were placed in low wood-framed structures, while the rear lights were designed as tall, skeletal wrought iron towers. Both rear lights were substantially similar, except that the rear Port Penn light was 30 feet (9.1 m) higher.

Within the tapering skeletal structure an 8-foot (2.4 m) diameter cylindrical stair tower rises to the underside of the lantern. The shell is composed of two .25-inch (6.4 mm) plates overlapped and offset by 3 inches (76 mm), so when stacked they interlock. A small iron-plate vestibule forms the entrance at the base. A curved inner door (now removed) rolled sideways at the cylinder. The cylinder is lined with wood, with the stairway spiraling up within around a 9-inch (230 mm) diameter central column. The topmost section of the cylinder contains a watchroom, from which the lantern may be reached by a ladder. The lantern contained a second-order fixed white light that operated 24 hours a day.

== History ==
The light first operated on April 2, 1877, and continued until October 25, 1904, when a new channel required the light to be moved. The renamed Liston Range was temporarily illuminated by a locomotive-style lamp on a 100-foot (30 m) pole until the rear light could be moved. The new second order light from Barbier, Bernard et Turenne of Paris, France was first illuminated on May 15, 1906. A new keeper's house, barn and oil house were built to service the new location. In the 1930s the light was electrified and the keeper's house was sold. A 250 watt bulb was mounted in an automatic bulb changer that moved a fresh bulb into position if one burned out. The light shines from a 4-foot (1.2 m) square window aligned with the range.

On April 10, 2012, the U.S. General Services Administration announced that the Liston Range Light, including the light tower and associated oil house, situated on 0.4 acres, would be made available for purchase under the National Historic Lighthouse Preservation Act.
