= Retirement Farm =

Historic house in Delaware, United States

- U.S. National Register of Historic Places
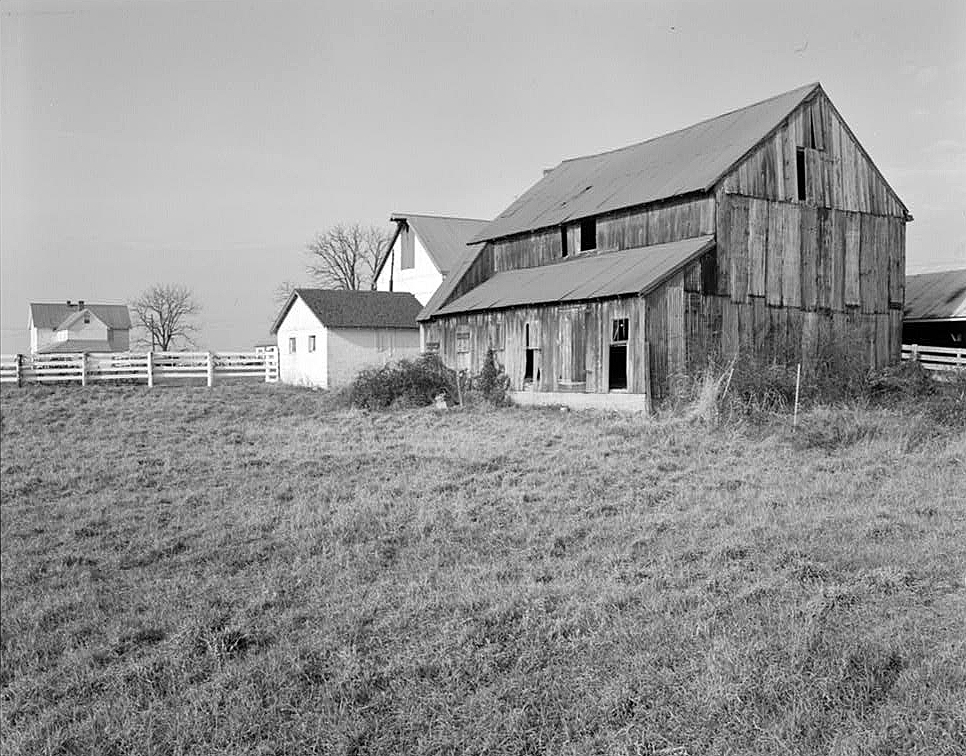
- Retirement Farm barn in 1982

- Location within Delaware Location within the United States
- Location: 2256 DuPont Parkway in St. Georges Hundred, Odessa, Delaware
- Coordinates: 39.512707°N 75.643879°W
- Area: 5 acres (2.0 ha)
- Architectural style: Late Victorian, Greek Revival, Federal
- MPS: Rebuilding St. Georges Hundred 1850-1880 TR
- NRHP reference No.: 85002113
- Added to NRHP: September 13, 1985

Retirement Farm, also known as the James M. Vandergrift Farm, is a historic home and farm located near Odessa, New Castle County, Delaware. It was built in the late-19th century, and is a 2 1/2-story, five-bay frame, gable roofed farmhouse with a two-story rear ell. Also on the property are a small barn (c. 1800), granary (c. 1850), and barn (c. 1900). The small barn is the last known example of its kind surviving in St. Georges Hundred.

It was listed on the National Register of Historic Places in 1985.
