= Aerobeacon =

Type of flashing long-distance beacon

An aerobeacon is a light assembly used to create a fixed or flashing signal visible over long distances. It consists of a high intensity electric lamp mounted with a focusing device in a cylindrical housing, which usually is rotated on a vertical axis by an electric motor. The sweep of the narrow beam thus produced gives the flashing effect. Aerobeacons were originally developed for aviation use, mostly as aerodrome beacons, but they also saw extensive use in lighthouses. They were far less expensive to manufacture and maintain than classic glass Fresnel lenses, and much more durable; they could be mounted and exposed to the weather. Historic models include the DCB-24, which used a single parabolic reflector; the DCB-224, a double-beamed version of the DCB-24; and the DCB-36, which used a system of plastic Fresnel type lenses. Manufacturers included Carlisle & Finch in Cincinnati and the Crouse-Hinds Company in Syracuse, New York. Aerobeacons have replaced fragile glass Fresnel lenses in many lighthouses and are still widely used in other applications.

== DCB-224 ==
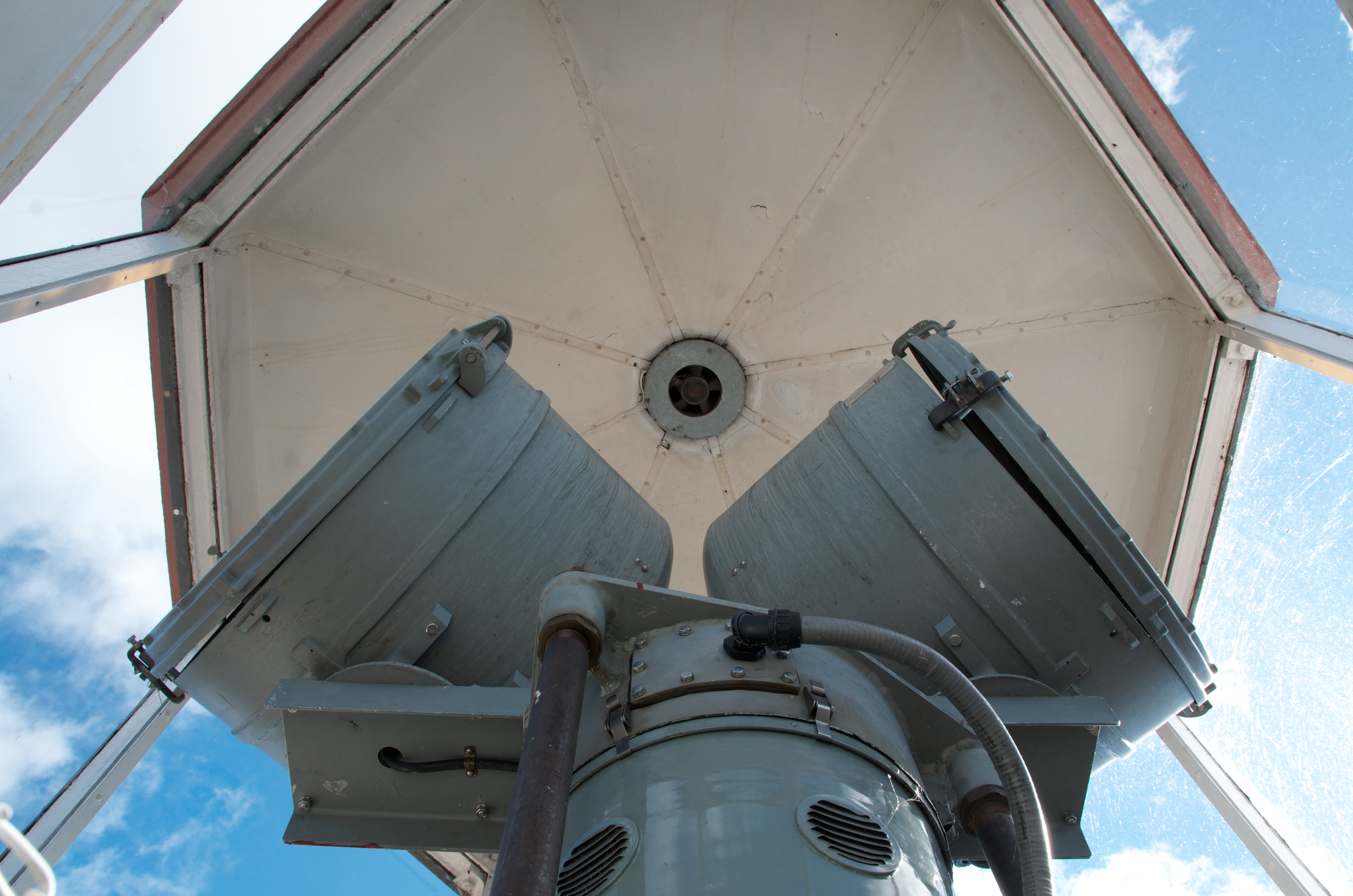
DCB-224 - Two Harbors Light

The model DCB-224 is a high-power spotlight designed and built by Carlisle & Finch. Originally intended for use as an aerodrome beacon, it was also widely used in marine lighthouses.

Depending on the type of bulb installed, the beam could be seen for 18 to 26 nautical miles (33 to 48 km). The unit consists of a 25-inch aluminum housing with a parabolic reflector. An electric motor and gearbox drives the optical unit's rotation. They can optionally be fitted with a CG-2P automatic bulb changer.

The letters DCB stand for Directional Code Beacon.

== See also ==
- Aerial lighthouse
- Aerodrome beacon
- Airway beacon
