= Bellevue Range Rear Light =

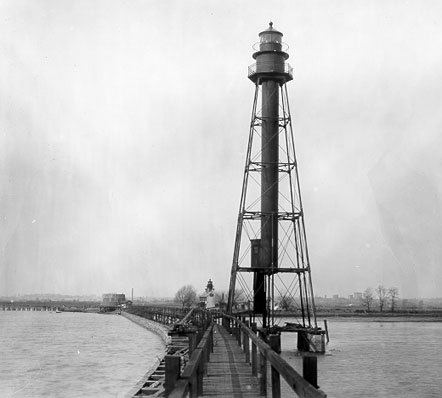
- Bellevue Range Rear Light
- Location: Wilmington; Delaware; United States
- Coordinates: 39.720315°N 75.517895°W

Tower
- Constructed: 1909 (first)
- Foundation: concrete piles
- Construction: cast iron skeletal tower
- Automated: 1934
- Height: 93 feet (28 m) (current); 104 feet (32 m) (first)
- Shape: triangular pyramidal skeletal tower with balcony and light (current) square pyramidal skeletal tower with central cylinder (first)
- Markings: black tower (first)
- Operator: United States Coast Guard
- Heritage: National Register of Historic Places listed place

Light
- First lit: 2001 (current)
- Deactivated: 2001 (first)
- Focal height: 93 feet (28 m) (current)
- Lens: Fourth order Fresnel lens
- Characteristic: F G (current)
- Bellevue Range Rear Light Station
- U.S. National Register of Historic Places
- Area: less than one acre
- Built by: U.S. Lighthouse Board
- MPS: Light Stations of the United States MPS
- NRHP reference No.: 06000313
- Added to NRHP: April 26, 2006

Bellevue Range Rear Lighthouse is a lighthouse in Delaware, United States, at the mouth of the Christina River on the Delaware River, Wilmington, Delaware

== History ==
The Bellevue Range Rear Lighthouse is a pyramidal skeletal light tower built in 1909 on the grounds of a landfill. It was operated by resident keepers from 1909 until 1934 when it was automated. The Bellevue Range Rear light was deactivated in 2001 when the landfill grew too high to see the light, and a modern tower was built to replace it. The modern tower is an active aid to navigation. The Bellevue Range Rear Light is not open to the public.

It was listed on the National Register of Historic Places in 2006.

== Head keepers ==
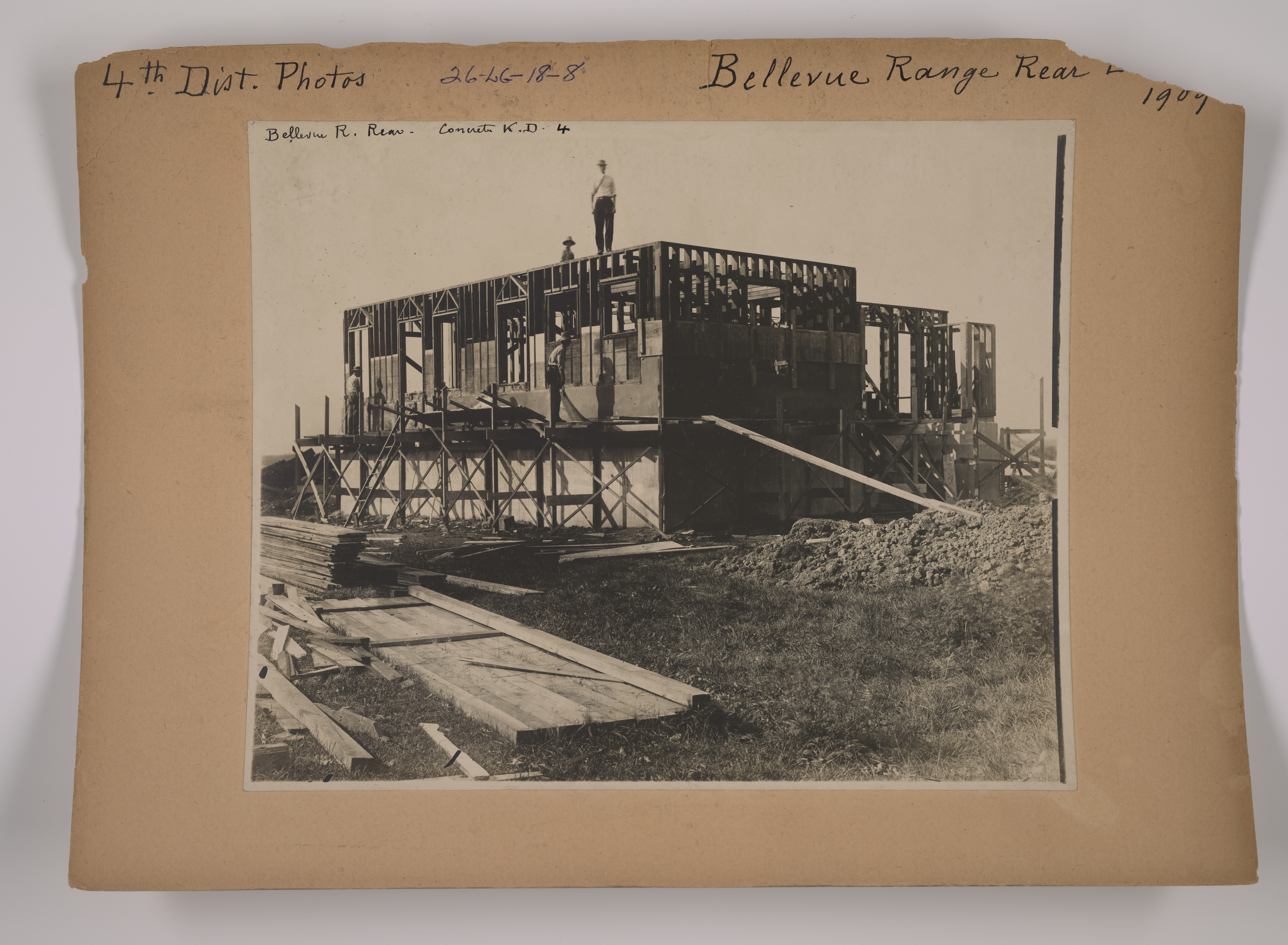
Lighthouse keeper's dwelling, 1909

- William E. Spicer (1909 – 1911)
- Linwood Spicer (1911 – at least 1917)
- William H. Johnson (1919 – 1938)

== See also ==
- List of lighthouses in Delaware
- List of lighthouses in the United States
