= Marcus Hook Range Rear Light =

Lighthouse in Delaware, United States

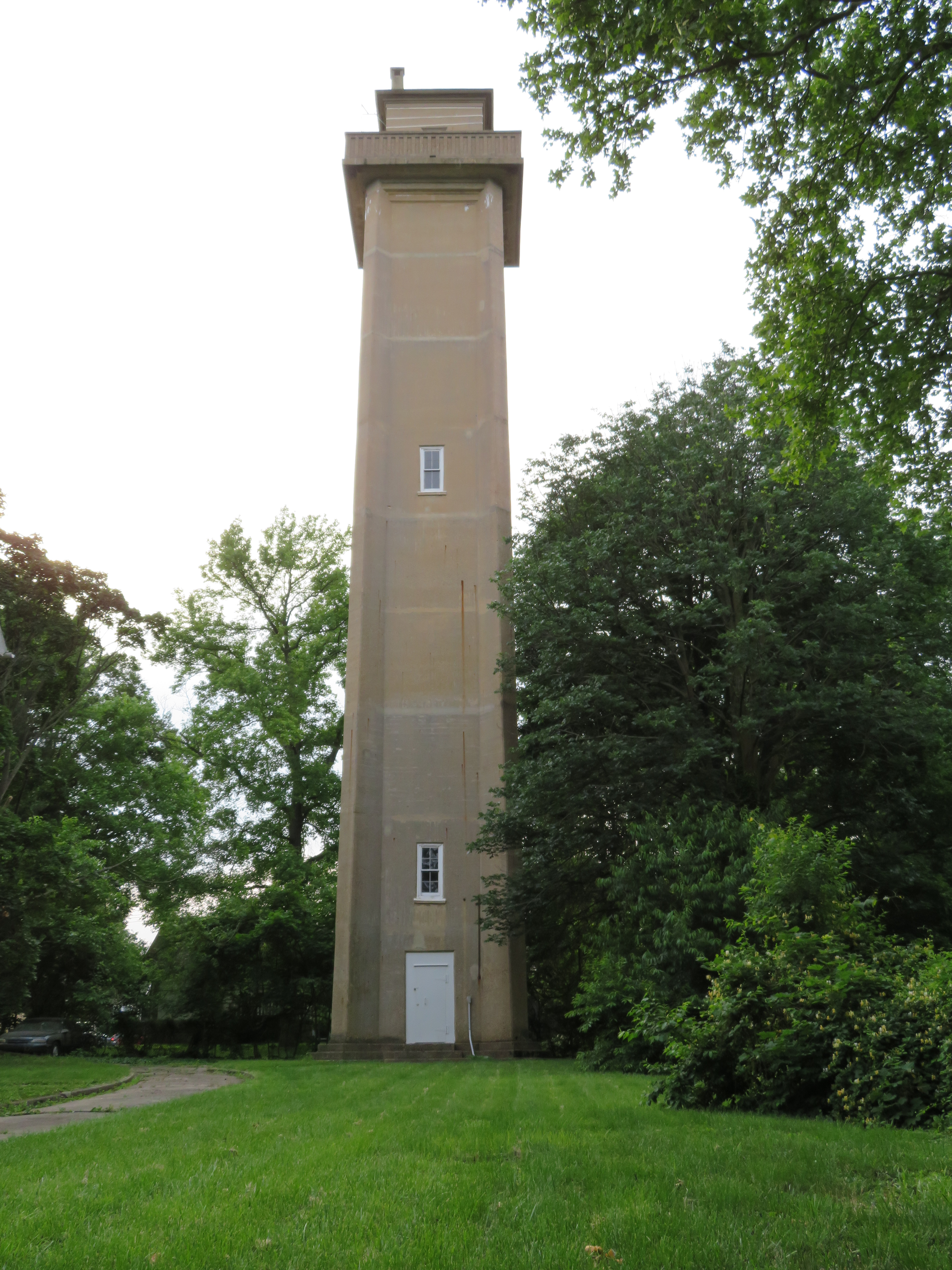
- Lightouse viewed from shore.
- Location: Just South of Bellefonte, Delaware
- Coordinates: 39°45′44.2″N 75°30′11.3″W

Tower
- Constructed: 1915
- Foundation: Concrete
- Construction: Reinforced concrete
- Automated: 1950s
- Height: 105 feet (32 m)
- Shape: Square
- Heritage: National Register of Historic Places listed place

Light
- First lit: 1920
- Focal height: 278 feet (85 m)
- Lens: Fourth order Fresnel lens (original), RL-24 (current)
- Characteristic: Fixed red (initially fixed white)
- Marcus Hook Range Rear Light
- U.S. National Register of Historic Places
- Architectural style: Colonial Revival
- NRHP reference No.: 89000287
- Added to NRHP: March 27, 1989

Marcus Hook Range Rear Light is a lighthouse near Bellefonte, Delaware marking a range on the Delaware River. It is the highest light on the Atlantic coast of the United States. The lighthouse is visible on the horizon from the windows of high-rise buildings in downtown Wilmington, Delaware.

== History ==
The permanent structure was preceded by a temporary light on a post, erected in 1915. The present tower was built in 1918 and was composed of nine sections of reinforced concrete; there is also an oil house and a keeper's dwelling on the site. The original beacon displayed a fixed white light using a Fourth order Fresnel lens; this was removed in the early 1980s and replaced with a RL-24 beacon, displaying a fixed red indication. The light was automated in the 1950s, but the keeper's house was occupied by Coast Guard personnel until 2004.

In March 2005 the lighthouse became available for transfer under the National Historic Lighthouse Preservation Act, but in 2010 a private owner bought the lighthouse and the accompanying home on the property. The tower is an active aid to navigation and not open to the public.

== Front Light ==
The Marcus Hook Range Front Light stood about 100 yards (91 m) offshore, 1.6 miles (2.6 km) to the northeast of Marcus Hook Range Rear Light. Its tower was erected in 1925 and was preceded by a temporary light tower erected in 1915. It has always been automated.

== Replacement range ==
In June 2019, a new rear range light was erected approximately where the front range light was, and a new front range light was erected upstream. The (old) rear range light was turned off.
