= Skeletal tower =

Lighthouse towers that have only an open frame

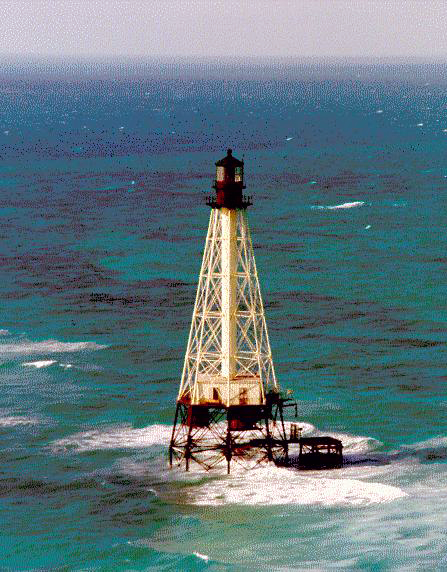
Alligator Reef Light in Florida

Skeletal frame light towers are lighthouse towers that have only an open frame. They are commonly built as aids to navigation; most of them are not considered to be lighthouses. However, during the late nineteenth century and the first years of the twentieth, larger skeletal towers were installed at various light stations throughout the United States. These lights were originally tended by lighthouse keepers, so they were and are listed as lighthouses.

Skeletal towers became very popular with the United States Congress, because they cost less than half the price of a stone or brick tower of the same height. Since they were assembled from prefabricated sections, they could be built quickly, even at remote locations. If necessary, they could also be disassembled and shipped to a new location.
