= Port Penn, Delaware =

Census-designated place in United States

- Census-designated place
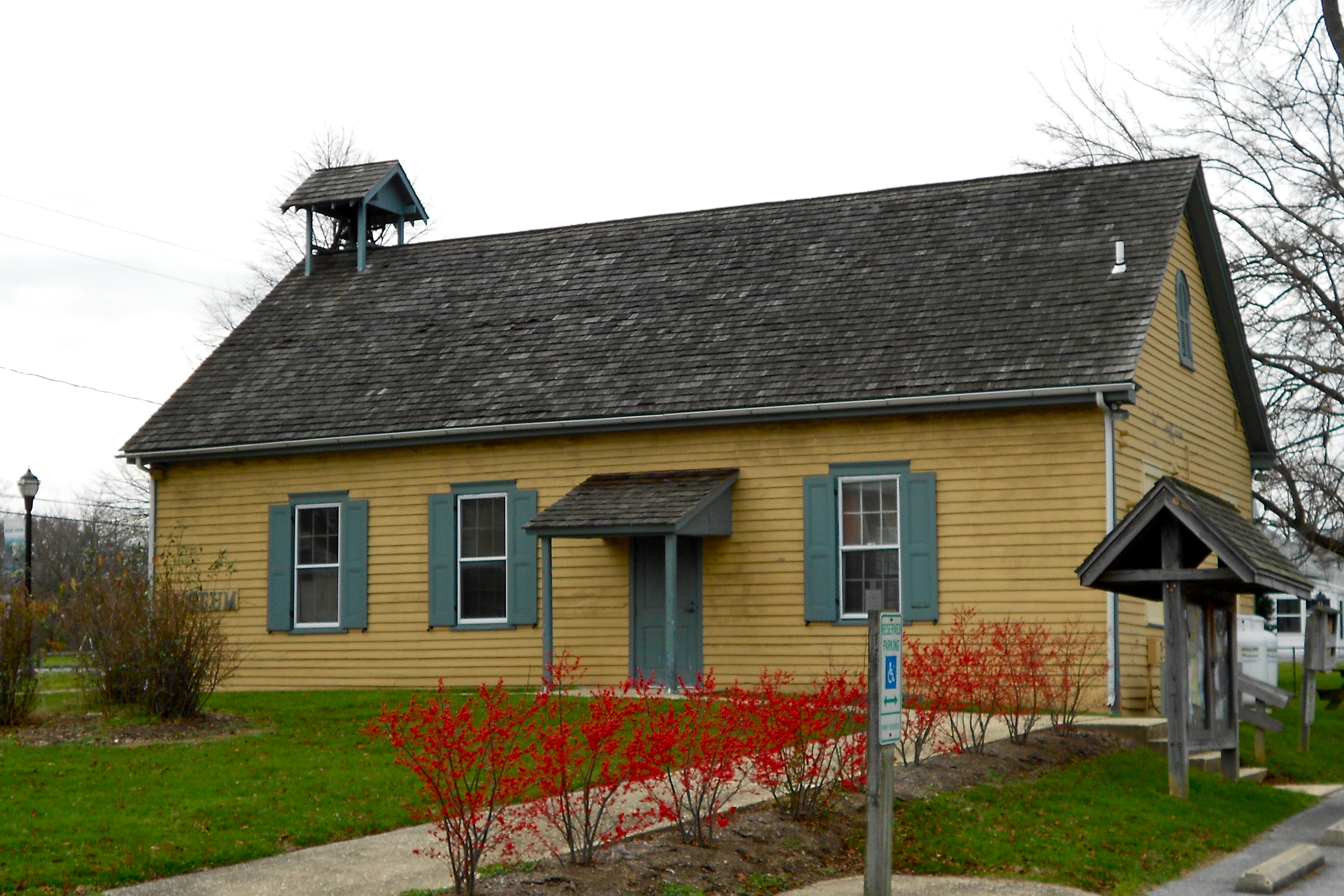
- Port Penn Interpretive Center

- Location within the state of Delaware Port Penn, Delaware (the United States)
- Coordinates: 39°31′00″N 75°34′36″W
- Country: United States
- State: Delaware
- County: New Castle

Area
  - Total: 0.46 sq mi (1.20 km^{2})
  - Land: 0.41 sq mi (1.05 km^{2})
  - Water: 0.058 sq mi (0.15 km^{2})
- Elevation: 7 ft (2.1 m)

Population (2020)
  - Total: 162
  - Density: 400.5/sq mi (154.63/km^{2})
- Time zone: UTC-5 (Eastern (EST))
  - Summer (DST): UTC-4 (EDT)
- ZIP code: 19731
- Area code: 302
- FIPS code: 10-58600
- GNIS feature ID: 214477

Port Penn is a census-designated place located in St. Georges Hundred, southern New Castle County, Delaware, United States, below the Chesapeake and Delaware Canal on the west bank of the Delaware River. Port Penn is home to the Port Penn Interpretive Center. As of the 2020 census, Port Penn had a population of 162.

Historical population
Census	Pop.	Note	%±
2020	162		—
U.S. Decennial Census

== Education ==
Port Penn is in the Colonial School District. It operates William Penn High School.

== Demographics ==
Port Penn first appeared as a census designated place in the 2020 U.S. census.

=== Racial and ethnic composition ===
Port Penn CDP, Delaware – Racial and ethnic composition Note: the US Census treats Hispanic/Latino as an ethnic category. This table excludes Latinos from the racial categories and assigns them to a separate category. Hispanics/Latinos may be of any race.
Race / Ethnicity (NH = Non-Hispanic)	Pop 2020	2020
White alone (NH)	142	87.65%
Black or African American alone (NH)	3	1.85%
Native American or Alaska Native alone (NH)	0	0.00%
Asian alone (NH)	0	0.00%
Native Hawaiian or Pacific Islander alone (NH)	0	0.00%
Other race alone (NH)	0	0.00%
Mixed race or Multiracial (NH)	11	6.79%
Hispanic or Latino (any race)	6	3.70%
Total	162	100.00%
