= Townsend Historic District =

Historic district in Delaware, United States

- U.S. National Register of Historic Places
- U.S. Historic district
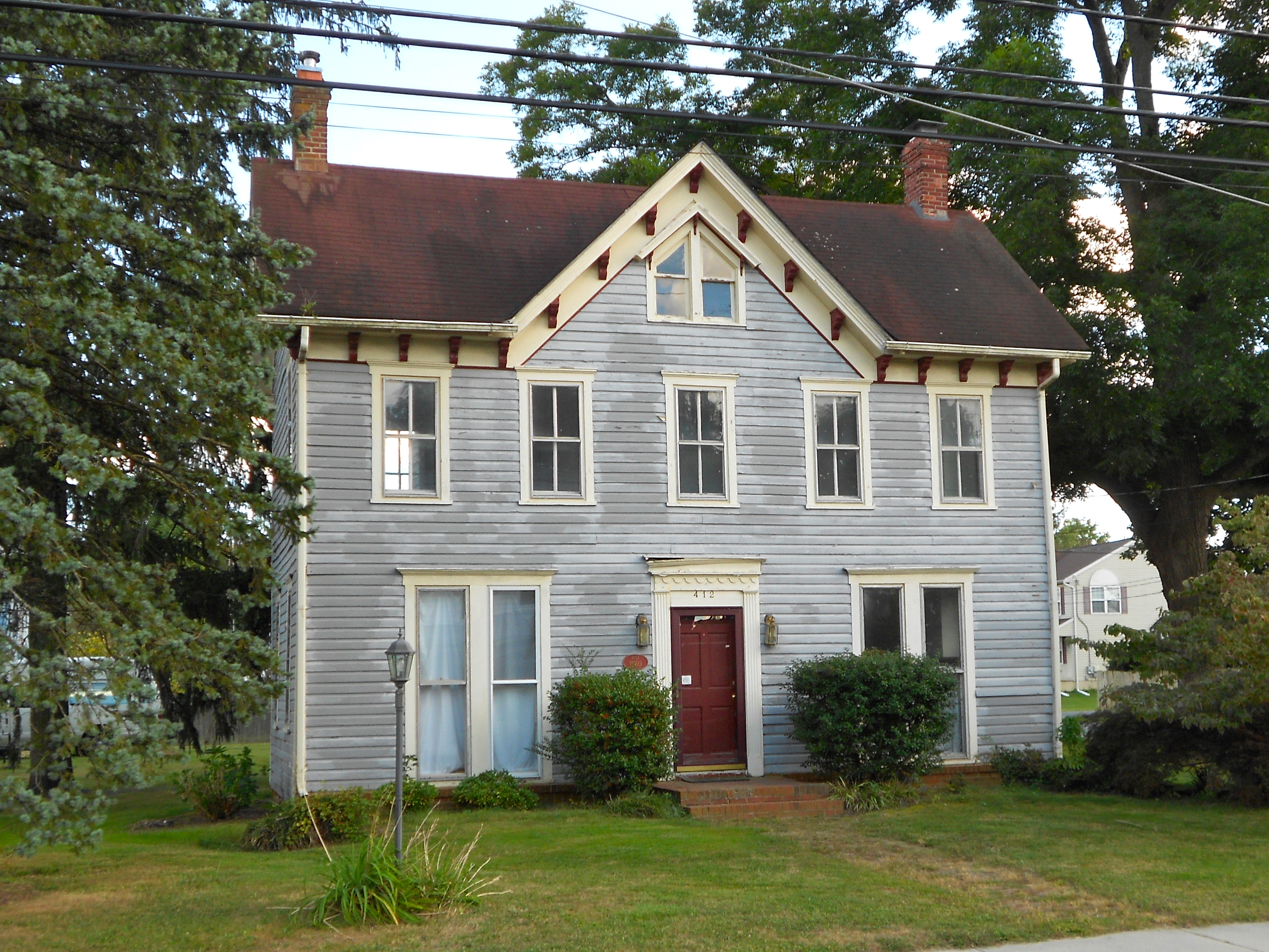
- House on Main Street

- Location within Delaware Location within the United States
- Location: Roughly bounded by Gray, Ginn and South, Lattamus and Main Sts., and Commerce St. and Cannery Ln. and Railroad Ave., Townsend, Delaware
- Coordinates: 39°23′39″N 75°41′33″W
- Area: 46 acres (19 ha)
- Built by: Maloney, Thomas; et al.
- Architectural style: Late 19th And 20th Century Revivals, Bungalow/craftsman, Late Victorian
- NRHP reference No.: 86001029
- Added to NRHP: May 8, 1986

Townsend Historic District is a national historic district located at Townsend, New Castle County, Delaware. It encompasses 216 contributing buildings and 5 contributing structures in the crossroads and railroad village of Townsend. It includes a mix of commercial and residential buildings primarily dating to the late-19th century and early-20th century. Notable buildings include the Immanuel M. E. Church and Parsonage, Lattamus store (1851), Dr. Niles house (c. 1910), Maloney Store, Townsend-Dickenson Hotel/Harmon's Drug Store, Evan's Store (c. 1900), Hart's Grain, Seed and Coal Store, S. Townsend house (c. 1840), Winfield Cottage (c. 1870), school (1932), and the former St. Mary's Episcopal Church.

It was listed on the National Register of Historic Places in 1986.

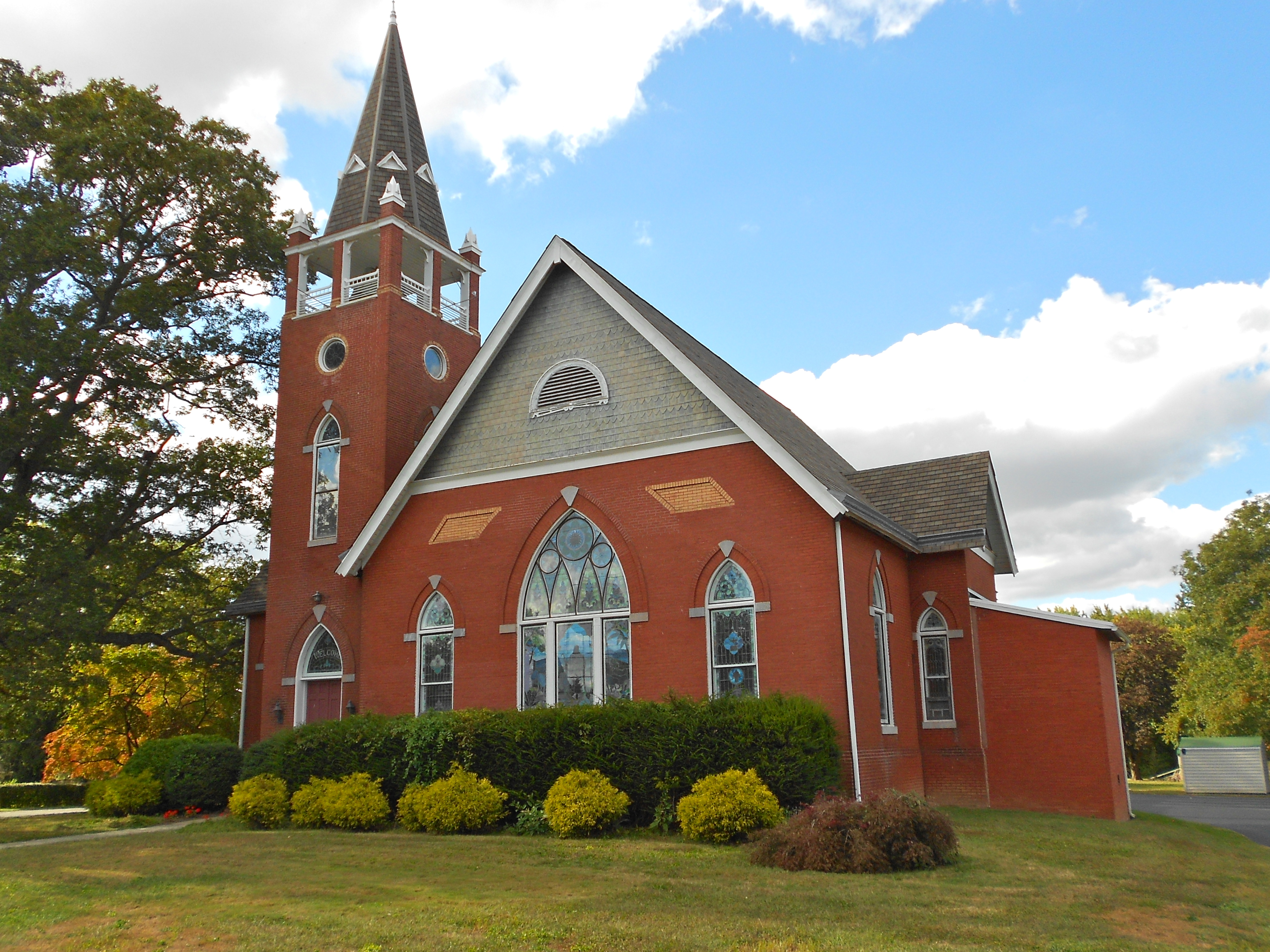
Immanuel Church

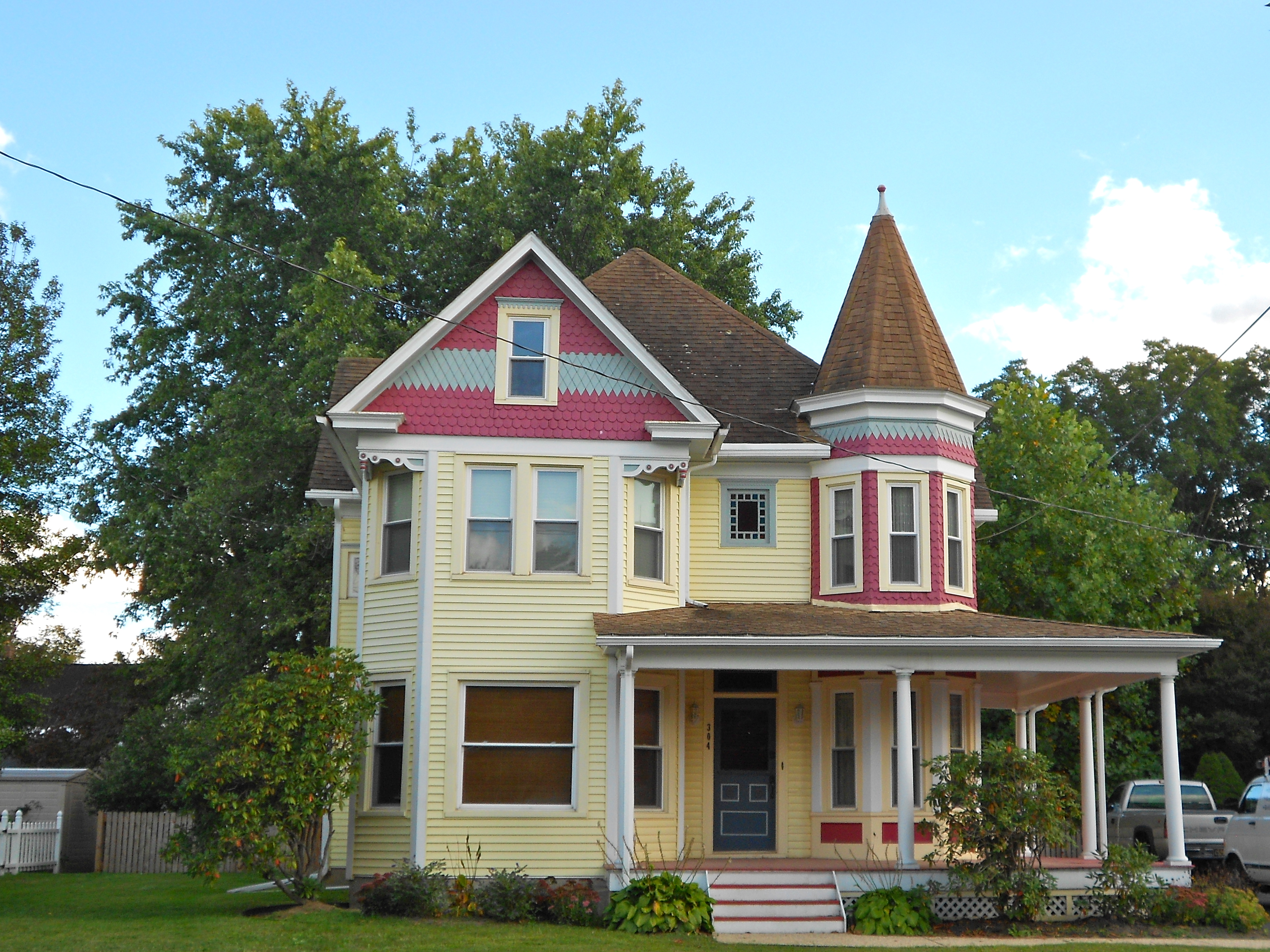
304 Main St.

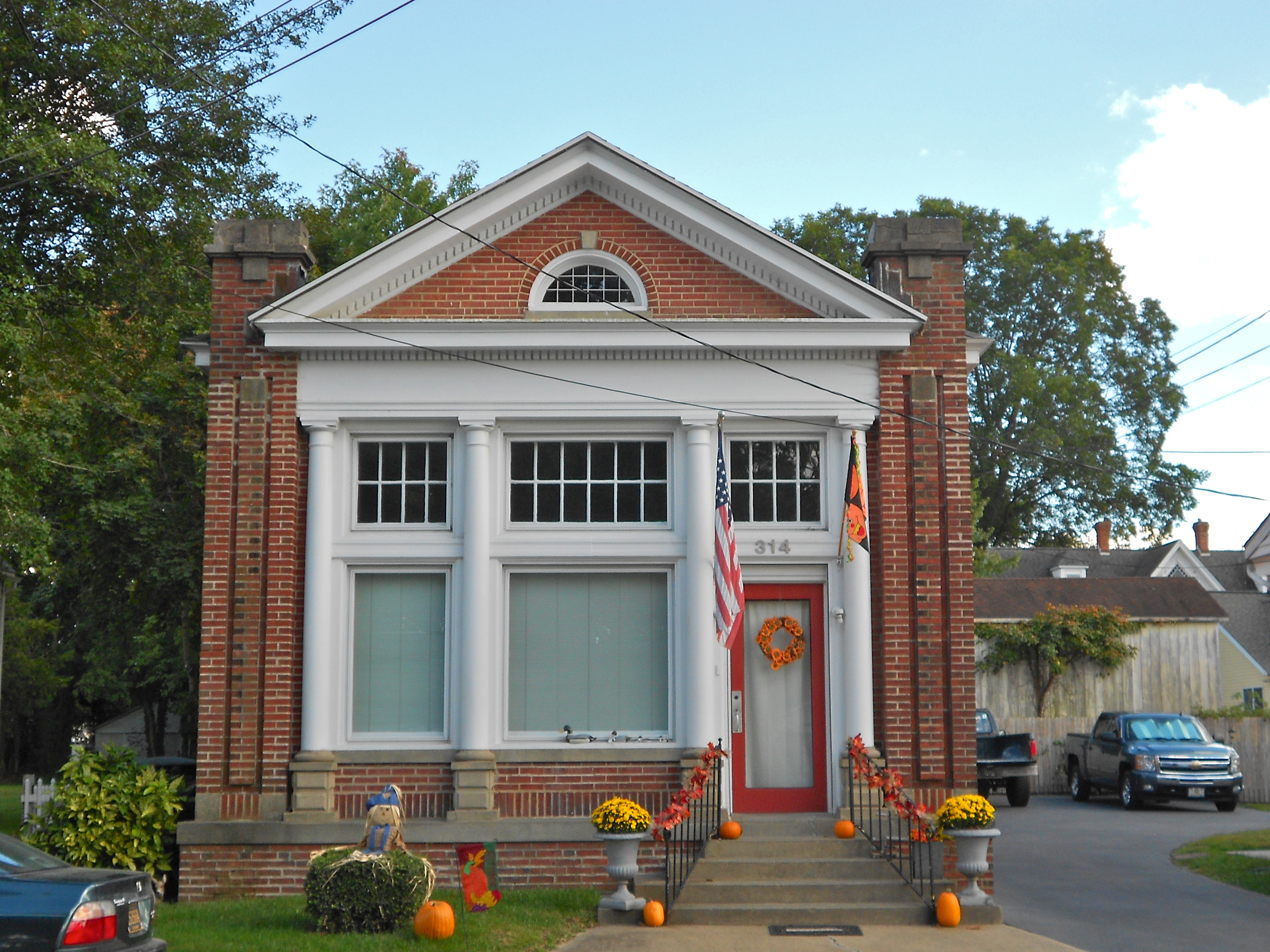
314 Main St.

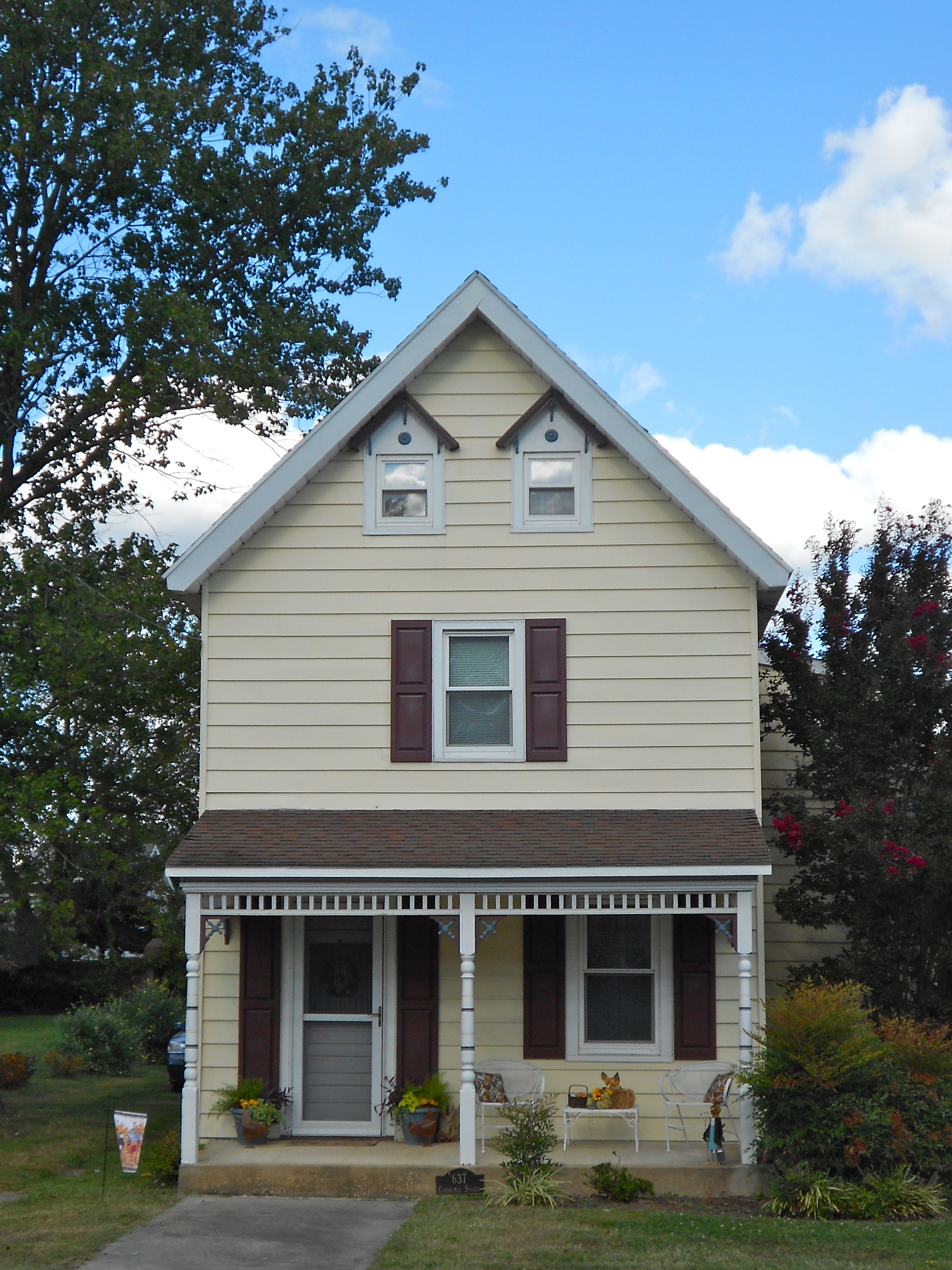
637 Commerce St.

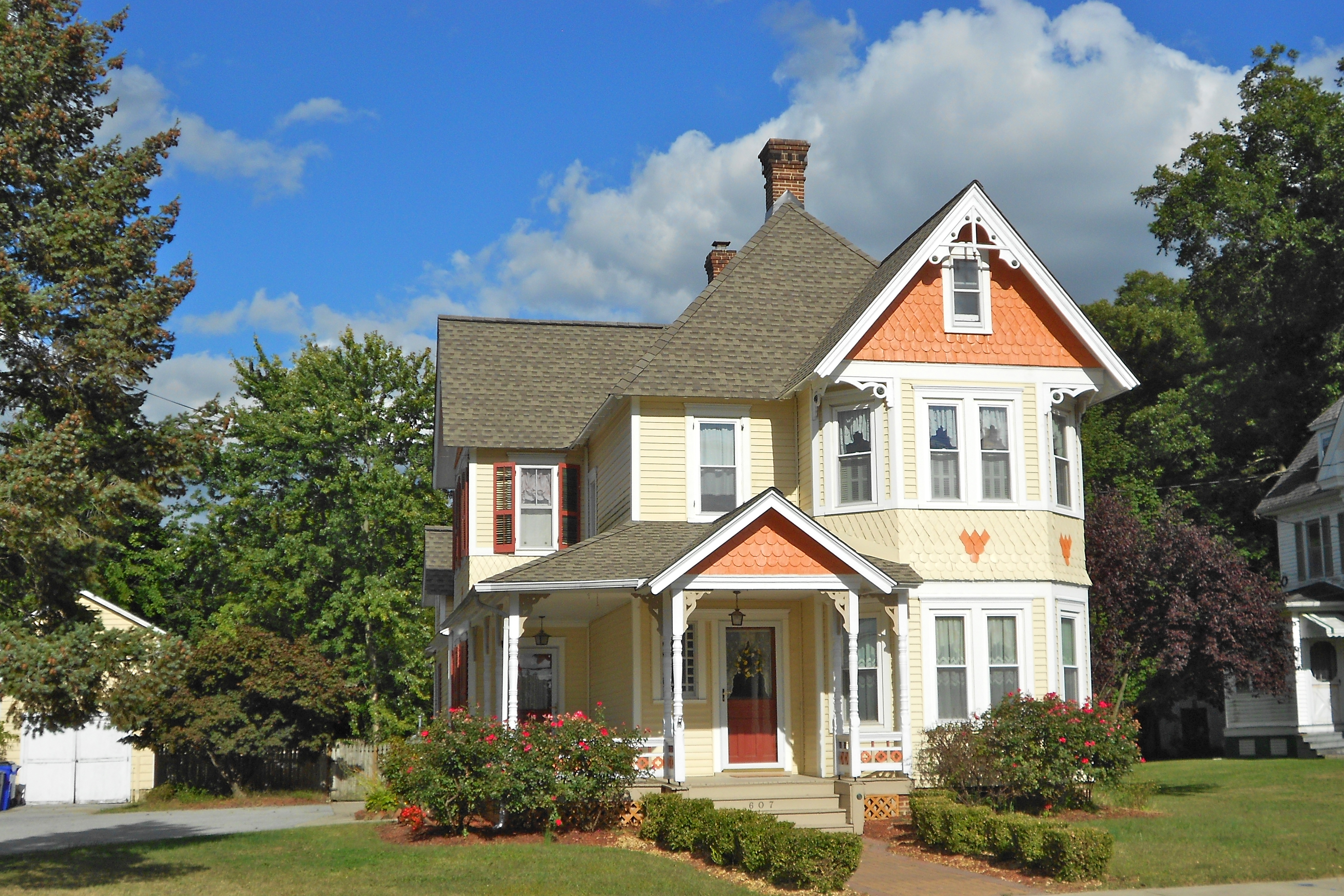
607 Commerce St.

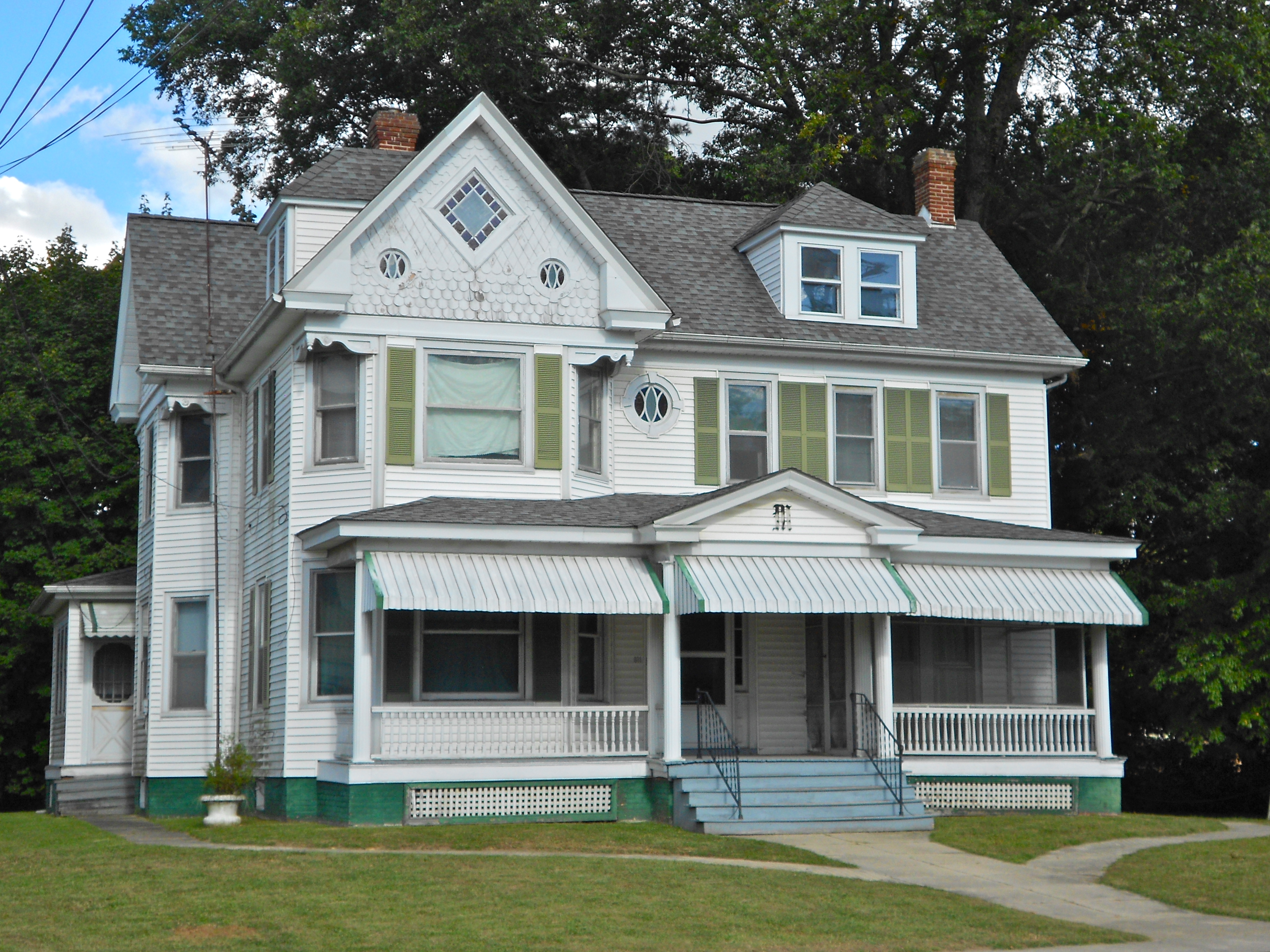
611 Commerce St.
