= Delaware Route 16 =

State highway in Kent and Sussex counties in Delaware, United States

Delaware Route 16

Route information
- Maintained by DelDOT
- Length: 30.31 mi (48.78 km)
- Existed: 1936–present
- Tourist routes: Delaware Bayshore Byway

Major junctions
- West end: MD 16 in Hickman
- DE 36 in Greenwood; US 13 in Greenwood; US 113 in Ellendale; DE 30 near Milton; DE 5 in Milton; DE 1 near Broadkill Beach
- East end: Dead end in Broadkill Beach

Location
- Country: United States
- State: Delaware
- Counties: Kent, Sussex

Highway system
- Delaware State Route System; List; Byways
| ← DE 15 | → DE 17 |

Delaware Route 16 (DE 16) is an east-west state highway in Delaware, mainly across northern Sussex County, with a small portion near the Maryland border in extreme southwestern Kent County. It runs from Maryland Route 16 (MD 16) at the Maryland border in Hickman east to the Delaware Bay at Broadkill Beach. The route passes through rural areas along with the towns of Greenwood, Ellendale, and Milton. DE 16 intersects DE 36 and U.S. Route 13 (US 13) in Greenwood, US 113 in Ellendale, DE 30 and DE 5 in the Milton area, and DE 1 between Milton and Broadkill Beach. West of DE 1, the route serves as part of a connection between the Baltimore–Washington Metropolitan Area and the Delaware Beaches. DE 16 was built as a state highway during the 1920s and 1930s. By 1936, the route was designated onto its current alignment.

== Route description ==
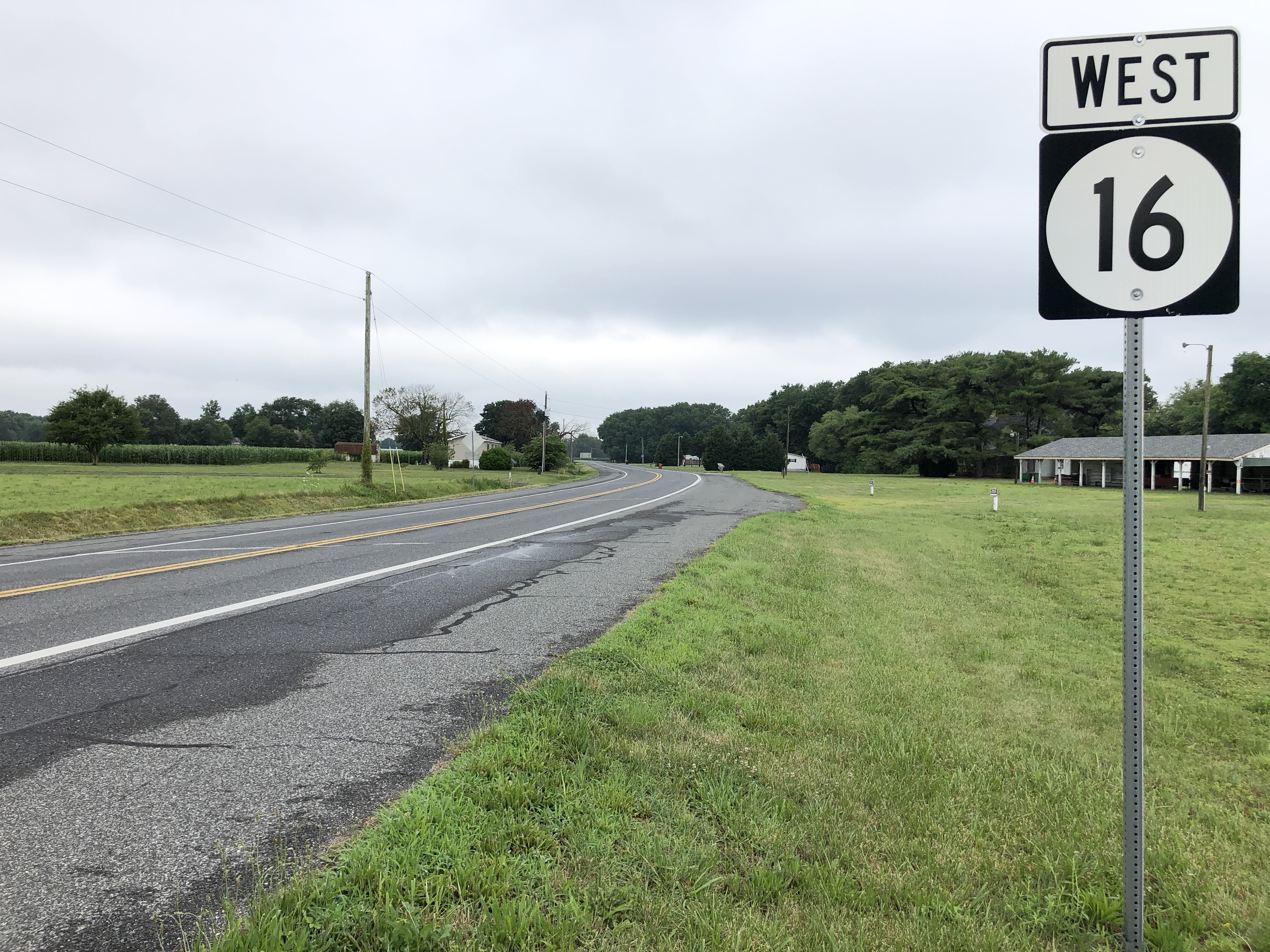
DE 16 westbound in Adamsville

DE 16 begins at the Maryland border in the community of Hickman in Kent County, where the road continues west into that state as MD 16. From the state line, the route heads east on two-lane undivided Hickman Road, passing through a mix of farmland and woodland with some homes. The road crosses Marshyhope Creek in the community of Adamsville and enters Sussex County, curving to the southeast. DE 16 comes to an intersection with DE 36, at which point it turns east to form a concurrency with that route. The road enters the town of Greenwood and becomes Market Street, passing several homes along with a few businesses. The highway crosses the Delmarva Central Railroad's Delmarva Subdivision line at-grade before it intersects US 13 on the eastern edge of Greenwood. Past this intersection, DE 16/DE 36 leaves Greenwood and becomes Beach Highway, crossing the Nanticoke River.

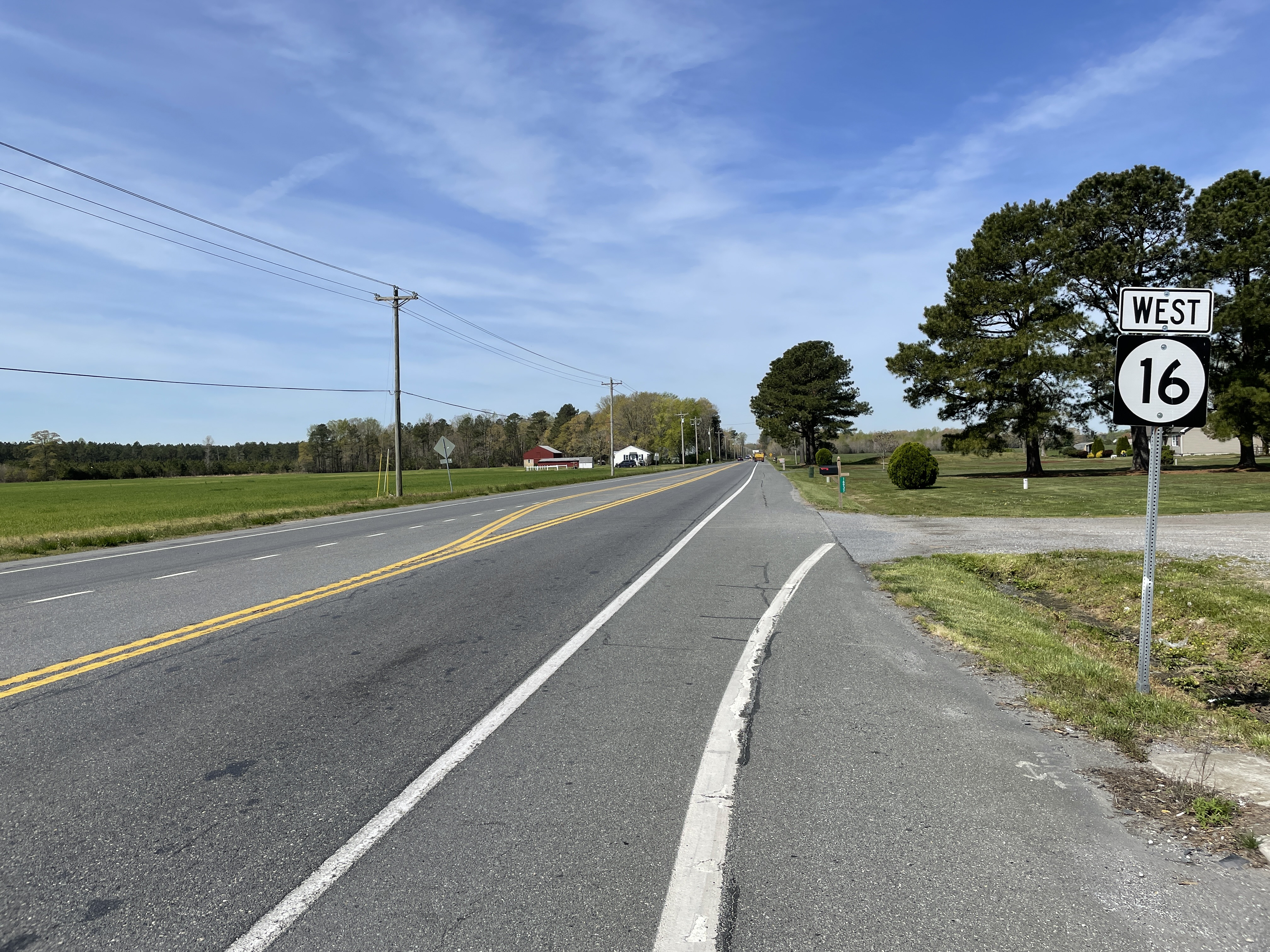
DE 16 westbound past US 113 near Ellendale

In Saint Johnstown, the road becomes a divided highway and DE 36 splits from DE 16 by heading to the northeast on Shawnee Road. DE 16 soon becomes undivided again and continues east through agricultural areas and woods with some residences, crossing Toms Dam Branch and running through the community of Owens. Farther east, the road passes through the community of Oakley and crosses West Branch Gum Branch and then Gum Branch. The route comes to an intersection with US 113 near a few businesses, where it is briefly a divided highway. Past this intersection, the name changes to Milton Ellendale Highway and the two-lane undivided road enters the town of Ellendale, where it becomes Main Street. In Ellendale, DE 16 runs past several homes, crossing the Delmarva Central Railroad's Indian River Subdivision line at-grade. The road leaves the town and becomes Milton Ellendale Highway again, turning southeast. The route heads through woodland and farms, running immediately to the north of the Delmarva Central Railroad's Milton Industrial Track line. DE 16 turns east away from the railroad tracks and comes to an intersection with DE 30. At this point, DE 5 Alternate (DE 5 Alt.), which runs south along DE 30, heads east concurrent with DE 16. The road reaches the town of Milton, where it passes homes and businesses. DE 16 comes to an intersection with DE 5, where DE 5 Alt. ends and the road name changes to Broadkill Road. The route leaves Milton and continues into farmland with a few residences, turning to the northeast. The road intersects DE 1 and passes north of a golf course before it runs through a mix of farms and woods with some homes. DE 16 turns east and northeast through marshland within the Prime Hook National Wildlife Refuge before crossing Broadkill Sound and reaching the community of Broadkill Beach. Here, the route intersects Bay Shore Drive before ending at a dead end on the Delaware Bay.

The portion of DE 16 west of DE 1 serves as part of a route connecting the Chesapeake Bay Bridge and the Baltimore–Washington Metropolitan Area to the Delaware Beaches. DE 16 also serves as part of a primary hurricane evacuation route from Broadkill Beach and the Delaware Beaches to points inland. The section of the route between DE 30 near Milton and Broadkill Beach is designated as part of the Delaware Bayshore Byway, a Delaware Byway and National Scenic Byway. DE 16 has an annual average daily traffic count ranging from a high of 9,681 vehicles at the eastern edge of Greenwood to a low of 2,196 vehicles at west end of the DE 36 concurrency.

== History ==
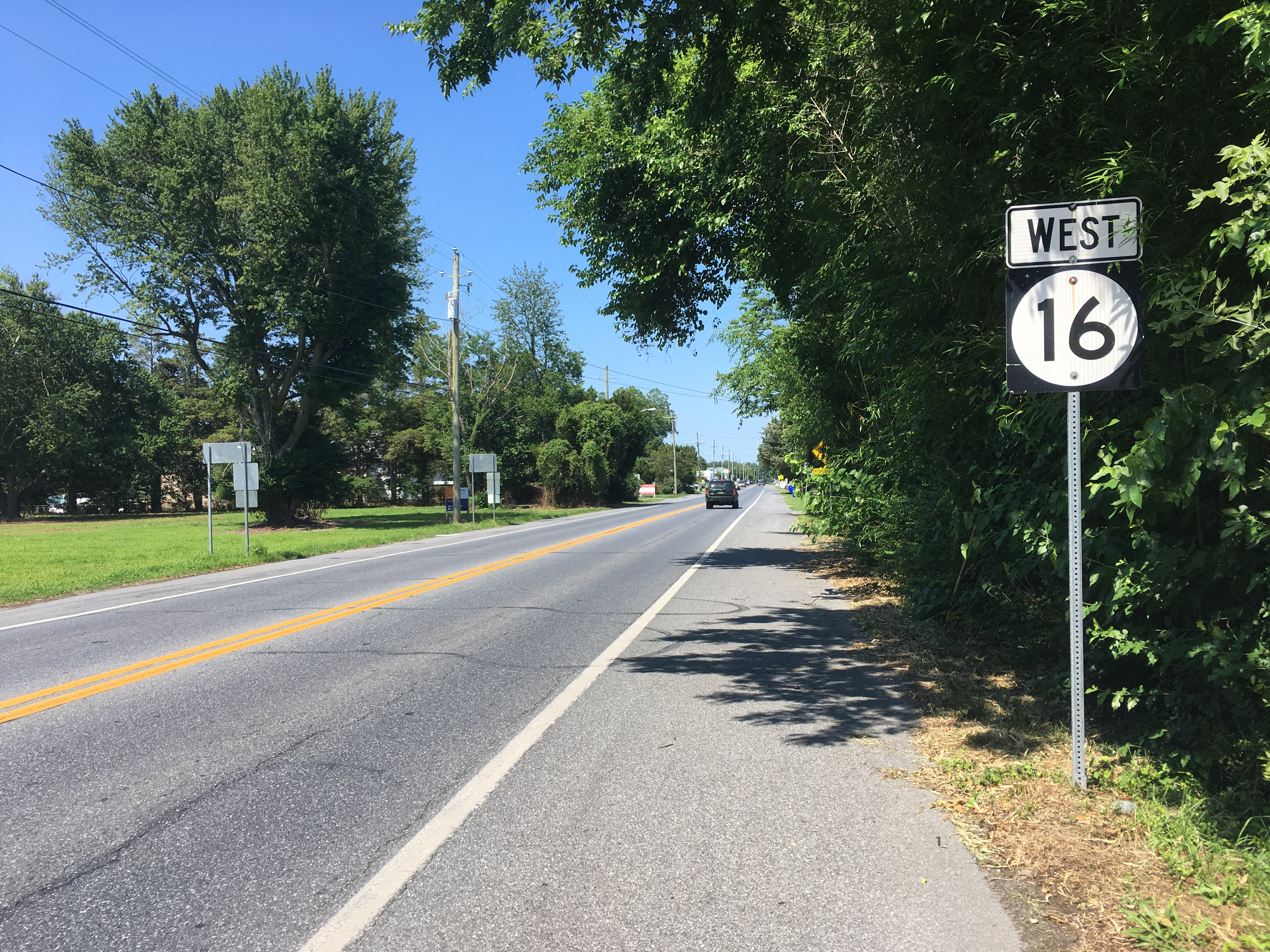
DE 16 westbound past DE 5 in Milton

What is now DE 16 originally existed as a county road by 1920. By 1924, the section of road in Greenwood was constructed as a state highway. A year later, the route between the Dupont Highway and Ellendale became a state highway. In 1929, the road was completed as a state highway between Ellendale and Milton. A year later, the state highway was built between Owens and Ellendale. The entire road west of Milton was finished as a state highway by 1931. By 1936, DE 16 was designated to run from the Maryland border east to Broadkill Beach along its current alignment. The portion of route east of DE 14 (present-day DE 1) was paved by 1942. In 2019, the Delaware Department of Transportation (DelDOT) began the Coastal Corridors Study to study east-west traffic patterns on roads in northern Sussex County including DE 16. The study is intended to develop long-term road improvements along the corridor. In March 2021, five virtual workshops on the study were held to present collected data and gather input from the public.

On June 21, 2022, a groundbreaking ceremony was held to mark the beginning of construction of an interchange with DE 1 east of Milton, with Governor John Carney, DelDOT secretary Nicole Majeski, and state and local officials in attendance. Construction of the interchange at DE 1 is planned to be completed in the later part of 2025. Another interchange is planned with US 113 as part of improving that highway; this plan is in the design phase. There are plans to construct a roundabout at the DE 30 intersection near Milton in order to reduce crashes at the intersection. The construction date of the roundabout is to be determined.

== Major intersections ==
| County | Location | mi | km | Destinations | Notes |
|---|---|---|---|---|---|
| Kent | Hickman | 0.00 | 0.00 | MD 16 west (Greenwood Road) – Denton, Bay Bridge | Maryland state line; western terminus |
| Sussex | Greenwood | 7.08 | 11.39 | DE 36 west (Scotts Store Road) to DE 404 | West end of DE 36 overlap |
| Sussex | Greenwood | 8.56 | 13.78 | US 13 (Sussex Highway) – Harrington, Dover, Bridgeville, Seaford | |
| Sussex | Saint Johnstown | 9.06 | 14.58 | DE 36 east (Shawnee Road) – Milford | East end of DE 36 overlap |
| Sussex | Ellendale | 16.62 | 26.75 | US 113 (Dupont Boulevard) – Milford, Georgetown | |
| Sussex | Milton | | | DE 30 / DE 5 Alt. south (Isaacs Road/Gravel Hill Road) – Milford, Gravel Hill, Oak Orchard | West end of DE 5 Alt. overlap |
| Sussex | Milton | 23.69 | 38.13 | DE 5 (Union Street/Union Street Extended) – Milton, Oak Orchard DE 5 Alt. ends | East end of DE 5 Alt. overlap; northern terminus of DE 5 Alt. |
| Sussex | | 26.41 | 42.50 | DE 1 (Coastal Highway) – Milford, Rehoboth Beach, Beaches | DE 1 exit 49; under construction |
| Sussex | Broadkill Beach | 30.31 | 48.78 | Dead end | Eastern terminus |
1.000 mi = 1.609 km; 1.000 km = 0.621 mi: Concurrency terminus
