= List of Delaware tornadoes =

Since 1950, there have been 82 confirmed tornadoes in the Mid-Atlantic state of Delaware, located in the United States. The state averages one tornado a year, although as many as six have been recorded in a year, which occurred in 1992. There have been as many as three tornadoes in a day, which has occurred four times: 1992, 1993, 2020, and most recently, 2026. The majority of tornadoes in the state of Delaware tend to be short-lived and weak, though an EF2 in 2020 associated with Hurricane Isaias carved a 35.8 mi (57.6 km) path across the state. The two strongest known tornadoes occurred on April 28, 1961 and April 1, 2023, being rated an F3 and EF3, respectively. Since the National Climatic Data Center (NCDC), now a part of the National Centers for Environmental Information (NCEI) began keeping track of tornadoes across the country, each of Delaware's three counties has recorded 28 tornadoes. Two fatal tornadoes have occurred since 1950: an F2 in Hartly that killed two people in 1983, and an EF3 in Bridgeville that killed one person in 2023.

Most tornadoes in Delaware in one day, 1950-2026
Date	Tornadoes
July 15, 1992	3
April 1, 1993	3
July 27, 1994	3
August 4, 2020	3
August 20, 2026	3
October 18, 1967	2
August 4, 1975	2
September 5, 1979	2
May 8, 1984	2
November 16, 1989	2
September 27, 1993	2
April 15, 2019	2
July 1, 2021	2

With the exception of February and December, tornadoes have occurred in every month in the state of Delaware. From 1950 to 1991, June through August was the most active period for tornadoes. The bulk of tornadoes happen from mid-afternoon through the early evening, between 3 p.m. to 8 p.m. 2022 was the most recent year where no tornadoes were recorded in the state. From 1988 through 1994, the state underwent an unusually active period for tornadoes, with 23 touching down. In contrast, the 2000s were an unusually inactive period. From 1999 to 2010, only two tornadoes touched down in the state—an F2 and F0 in 2004.

The most recent event was on August 20, 2026, when three tornadoes struck Kent County, including 2 EF1s and 1 EF0.

Tornadoes in Delaware, 1950-2026

== Tornadoes ==
=== Pre-1950 ===
- August 21, 1888 – Multiple tornadoes touched down across the region associated with a tropical storm that made landfall in Louisiana. An F2 tornado touched down and struck the Hares Corner area, killing a man inside a blacksmith shop. Additionally, 22 people were injured.
- September 17, 1888 – An F2 tornado touched down in Kenton in Kent County, unroofing a school, leading to a teacher being injured. It also destroyed a small house, injuring two others. (Note: Other sources list this tornado happening on September 16 or 17.)
- April 2, 1912 – A tornado touched down in Dagsboro and destroyed a home, killing one and injuring two.
- August 25, 1941 – A tornado touched down in Lewisville, Chester County, crossed the Pennsylvania-Delaware state line and caused damage in Delaware. It crossed the Delaware River and into New Jersey, where it killed one man after a chimney crushed his truck in Swedesboro, Gloucester County. Approximately $150,000 of damage was caused in the state of Delaware.
- October 31, 1949 – An F2 tornado struck New Market in Sussex County, destroying two homes and damaging five more. Two injuries were reported. (Note: Some other sources list this tornado happening on October 21.)

=== 1950-1959 ===
- July 1, 1954 – An F2 tornado touched down in Middletown. Damage was estimated to be around $2,500.
- August 12, 1955 – An F2 tornado touched down near Bethany Beach and stayed on land for 2.7 mi (4.3 km) before moving offshore as a waterspout into the Atlantic Ocean. One person was injured. This may have stemmed from Hurricane Connie making landfall as a Category 2 hurricane on the Saffir–Simpson scale in North Carolina that same day.
- July 5, 1957 – An F1 tornado touched down between Dagsboro and Frankford, before crossing into Worcester County, Maryland and dissipating in the Assawoman Bay.
- September 10, 1957 – A short lived tornado struck Bridgeville in Sussex County, being rated an F1.
- July 14, 1958 – A weak tornado touched down in Claymont in northeastern New Castle County. The tornado was rated an F0.

=== 1960-1969 ===
- April 28, 1961 – A short-lived but intense F3 tornado touched down in the New Castle area, damaging six houses and destroying the wall of a warehouse. This was the strongest tornado in Delaware's history, later being tied in 2023.
- June 24, 1962 – An apparent anticyclonic tornado touched down in the Bethany Beach area, destroying A-frame houses, then moving out into the Atlantic Ocean. It was rated an F1.
- July 21, 1962 – An F1 tornado struck the city of New Castle. It lifted the roof off of a warehouse, damaged trees, houses and vehicles. Despite receving a rating, it is not entirely certain if a tornado or other weather phenomenon was responsible for the damage.
- January 27, 1967 – One of the first noted tornadoes to occur during the winter months was an F2 tornado that touched down and moved into Felton in Kent County. The tornado destroyed four houses and a service station. Nine houses and two other buildings were damaged. Seven people suffered minor injuries and were transported to Kent General Hospital in Dover. The tornado caused an estimated $250,000 in property damage.
- October 18, 1967 – A tornado occurred three miles southwest of the Wilmington Airport in the evening, demolishing a barn and a chicken house. Additionally, there was a probable tornado in the northern part of Wilmington that caused minor damage to houses. Both were rated an F1.

=== 1970-1979 ===
- June 28, 1973 – After nearly six years without a reported tornado in the state, an observer for the National Weather Service reported a tornado 10 miles northwest of Wilmington, or near Pike Creek. The tornado caused no damage and no casualties, and received an F0 rating as a result.
- March 19, 1975 – A weak tornado touched down near Jimtown in Sussex County. The F1 tornado destroyed a garage made out of wood and aluminum, damaged roofs and trees.
- April 3, 1975 – A small tornado struck Dover, causing a brick facade to collapse. It overturned a mobile home, which sent three people to the hospital for minor injuries.
- July 14, 1975 – A pilot reported a tornado that touched down multiple times between the Delaware-Maryland state line and Middletown in New Castle County. No damage or casualties were reported.
- August 4, 1975 – Severe thunderstorms moved across the Delaware Valley, spawning two tornadoes, one in Kent County and the other in Sussex County. The Sussex County tornado hit the Harbeson area, causing minor damage. The Delaware State Police reported a tornado near Cheswold in Kent County, with no damage or casualties reported.
- March 21, 1976 – An intense squall line with gusts estimated of up to 100 mph (160 km/h) spawned an apparent tornado in New Castle, causing significant damage to homes and damaging utility poles. One person was injured.
- June 30, 1976 – A weak tornado caused minor damage to trees and homes in Lewes, located in Sussex County, and was rated an F0.
- March 13, 1977 – An F1 tornado occurred in the Marydel area of Kent County. The tornado first touched down in the Greenbriar development, where minor damage occurred to several homes inside the development. A large tree was uprooted. It lifted shortly thereafter, before touching back down and ripping a barn from its foundation. Damage was estimated to be anywhere between $15,000 to $20,000.
- June 9, 1977 – A tornado touched down in the early hours of the day, near Little Heaven, a small community in Kent County. It first struck a mobile home park, causing minor injuries to one person. An eyewitness of the tornado reported watching a vehicle being lifted about 15 ft (4.6 m) up in the air and crashing into the ground. Six mobile homes were destroyed, while eight were damaged. Most of the destroyed mobile homes were not tied down. An above-ground pool was destroyed, and its debris was strewn nearly two miles away. Telephone poles and trees were snapped. The tornado was rated an F2.
- August 10, 1979 – A small tornado touched down in New Castle County near Glasgow and Bear. It first struck a 15,000 sq ft (1,400 m^{2}) warehouse, resulting in the warehouse being practically destroyed. It continued into the port of Delaware City where it caused some damage. The damage from the warehouse alone was between $150,000 to $200,000, but the total damage was estimated to be around $300,000. The tornado was rated an F1.
- September 5, 1979 – Just a few weeks after the previous touchdown, Hurricane David spawned numerous tornadoes across the Mid-Atlantic, including an F2 tornado in Delaware. The tornado touched down near the Delaware River, continuing northwest through the Valley Run development in Wilmington. Roofs and porches were damaged, and windows were shattered. Numerous trees were uprooted, and vehicles suffered significant damage. Five people suffered injuries, caused by flying glass and debris. Another tornado touched down in Delaware, but the tornado was in Pennsylvania for a majority of its life. One person was killed, while four others were injured in Chester County, Pennsylvania.

=== 1980-1989 ===
- July 21, 1983 – Multiple tornadoes touched down across the region, including an F2 tornado that struck the northern part of Hartly, a small town in Kent County. The tornado destroyed two trailer homes, killing two people, one of which succumbed to their injuries six days later, and injuring nine more. This is the deadliest tornado in the state of Delaware.
- May 8, 1984 – Severe thunderstorms triggered two F1 tornadoes that tracked side-to-side from each other. The two tornadoes touched down in Maryland and crossed the state line into Delaware. Two trailer homes were destroyed, with 10 people suffering minor injuries. Both tornadoes were down for 3 mi (4.8 km) in the state.
- July 18, 1984 – An F2 tornado moved northeast into Greenwood, located in Sussex County. The tornado hit an elementary school, partially unroofing it. Numerous trees were uprooted in the rural area. Damage also happened to houses in varying degrees. A poorly-built house was destroyed, while a small house was partially damaged after a tree fell on the house.
- June 7, 1988 – A long track tornado hit both New Castle and Kent counties. Along its 23 mi (37 km) path, it touched down in New Castle County, first hitting the Summit Airport and the Middletown area, where a garage and barn were demolished. It then moved into Kent County, where it shifted from southeast to the east. It caused damage in Smyrna and Woodland Beach, where the most intense damage reportedly happened. A newly constructed housing development in Smyrna took a direct hit by the tornado, where one house was destroyed, and 120 homes suffered damage. Multiple planes were overturned at the local airport. The tornado weakened and moved out into the Delaware Bay where it dissipated. 30 people suffered injuries, but no fatalities occurred.
- July 21, 1988 – A weak and short-lived F0 tornado touched down in the Newark area of New Castle County, where it uprooted and sheared trees. No property damage was reported.
- June 6, 1989 – An F2 tornado touched down in the Hockessin area, destroying six well-built houses as well as hitting the Sanford School, a private school in the area, where the school gym was destroyed. Over 50 houses suffered damage, and vehicles were tossed in the air. About 50 to 60 trees were damaged, most being sheared off or uprooted. One person suffered minor injuries.
- August 15, 1989 – In the southern portion of Sussex County, a tornado with a 12.7 mi (20.4 km) long path tracked across the county. The tornado was spotted west of Frankford, and was last spotted a few miles northeast of Frankford. Despite no damage being reported since the tornado primarily tracked over rural and swamp areas, the tornado was rated an F1. No injuries or fatalities were reported.
- November 16, 1989 – A tornado outbreak swept across parts of the United States and Canada, spawning 40 tornadoes. In Delaware, a tornado touched down in the southern part of the city of Wilmington. It partially unroofed a warehouse and damaged several vehicles. Moving northeast, it became a waterspout as it tracked over the Christina River, a tributary of the Delaware River that flows past downtown Wilmington. An eyewitness reported it picked up water and sounded akin to a freight train. After it reached shore, it tore through a harbor, destroying a boat shed and injuring one person who was inside at the time. It ripped boats off of their moorings and moved boats that were in storage. Before dissipating, it also ripped off a door of a nearby restaurant. It received an F1 rating.

=== 1990-1999 ===
- October 18, 1990 – Intense thunderstorms ahead of a cold front produced a large tornado outbreak that produced 16 tornadoes across the Eastern United States, including an F2 in Delaware. Touching down in the Greenville area of New Castle County, this tornado carved a path that reached a maximum of 430 yd (390 m) wide about a mile long. 30 homes were damaged, and a barn was destroyed. Numerous trees also suffered damage. No injuries or fatalities were caused by this tornado.
- July 8, 1991 – A weak tornado that was first reported by a local resident touched down south of the city of Harrington. Upon closer examination by the Delaware State Police, a narrow damage swath was discovered. A mobile home was destroyed and a semi-trailer truck was overturned. Utility poles likely on the Delmarva Division railroad were left damaged.
- July 15, 1992 – Leading off the year with the most tornadoes in Delaware's recorded history, three tornadoes touched down in Sussex County. One was rated an F1 while two were rated an F0. The F1 tornado touched down just north of Millsboro. It blew a two-car garage off its foundation and damaged its siding. Both F0 tornadoes, which touched down near Laurel and Seaford respectively, only caused slight damage to trees. No injuries or fatalities were reported by any of the three tornadoes.
- July 31, 1992 – Two tornadoes touched down in the state on this day. An F2 tornado touched down in the Frederica area of Kent County, destroying two mobile homes and a building made out of cinder-block. Several other buildings were damaged as well. Additionally, it caused crop damage as it flattened fields of corn. It crossed DE 1 and lifted shortly thereafter. Another tornado touched down near the Maryland-Delaware state line, and was rated an F1.
- August 28, 1992 – Skywarn spotters reported a tornado on the ground near Seaford, which received an F0 rating.
- April 1, 1993 – Three weak tornadoes touched down across Kent and Sussex counties ahead of a cold front in the area. The strongest of which, an F1, touched down near Bowers, destroying a shed, pool and fence. The other two tornadoes were F0s, with one touching down near Harrington, likely lifting multiple times, and finally lifted near the Killens Pond State Park, only causing damage to trees. Another F0 touched down near Bridgeville, blowing out a restaurant's sign and knocking down trees.
- September 27, 1993 – Multiple tornadoes touched down across the Mid-Atlantic. In Delaware, two tornadoes tracked parallel to each other through New Castle County, with one being rated F2 and the other being rated F1. The F2 tornado first touched down just northwest of Summit Airport in Middletown, with most damage occurring to trees. Several homes inside a development were damaged, as well as houses under construction. The other tornado touched down north of the F2, blowing mobile homes off their foundations and destroying sheds.
- June 27, 1994 – A high-end F1 tornado touched down just southwest of Hartly, moved through Kent County and became a waterspout afterwards. It was on the ground for 15 mi (24 km) and had a maximum wind speed of 110 mph (180 km/h). However, the extent of the damage is unknown.
- July 27, 1994 – A rare tornado outbreak took place on this day, with 25 tornadoes touching down across the Mid-Atlantic, including 2 F3s in Pennsylvania. In Delaware, 3 tornadoes touched down in the southern portion of Kent County—1 F1 and 2 F0s. Two tornadoes, including the F1, were in Harrington, while the other was in Farmington. 4 people were injured by an F0 southwest of Farmington. One tornado hit a local high school, which was partially unroofed, and a tree fell in a classroom. The Delaware State Fair, an annual state fair that takes place in Harrington narrowly avoided a tornado hitting the fair, where thousands of people were in attendance.
- May 25, 1995 – A weak tornado touched down near Lums Pond State Park near Bear, knocking down trees and bringing down power lines. Minor damage occurred to several homes, and a camper and boat were flipped over.
- June 26, 1995 – An F0 tornado touched down a few miles west of Bridgeville, where an abandoned trailer was blown off their foundation and half of its roof left torn off. No injuries or fatalities were reported.
- August 13, 1998 – Over the Atlantic Ocean, three waterspouts touched down offshore, near Dewey Beach in Sussex County. The third and final waterspout came onshore, picking up sand and beach umbrellas that were left unattended. The tornado dissipated before it could potentially damage homes by the beach.

Damage to C-130 Hercules caused by an F2 tornado at Wilmington Airport in 2004

=== 2000-2009 ===
- July 12, 2004 – Severe thunderstorms brought wind damage, torrential rainfall leading to flash flooding and a weak tornado in Delaware. An F0 touched down and caused damage between Cheswold and Leipsic, primarily damaging trees.
- September 28, 2004 – The remnants of Hurricane Jeanne worked its way up the East Coast, which spawned an F2 tornado in northern New Castle County. The estimated wind speeds were estimated to be 130 mph (210 km/h). The tornado touched down at or near the Wilmington Airport off of US 13 at around 4:14 p.m., where the first indication of damage was inflicted on parked C-130 Hercules where some collided into each other. It also spilled thousands of pounds of jet fuel. It continued through the Wilmington Manor Industrial Park just north of the airport, where the most significant damage occurred. In the industrial park, multiple buildings were unroofed, trucks were overturned, and one building's wall partially failed, likely where the tornado peaked in intensity. Major damage was caused to a self-storage facility, where one man was injured after being trapped under a refrigerator. It lost intensity as it approached the junction connecting I-95, I-295 and I-495. It regained F1 strength shortly afterwards, causing damage to trees and houses near Elsmere. Two elementary schools in the area received minor damage. It lifted at around 4:26 p.m. just north of Elsmere. Five people were injured by this tornado, three of which were at the airport. Property damage was at least $1,000,000.

=== 2010-2019 ===
- August 27, 2011 – After nearly seven years without a recorded tornado in the state of Delaware, Hurricane Irene moved across the region, bringing heavy rain and spawned 6 tornadoes across the Northeast, including one in Delaware. It touched down just hours before Irene made landfall, embedded within the northern bands of the storm. It touched down near Lewes, damaging about 50 houses in the area. It uprooted or snapped numerous trees, and the most intense damage occurred when a house's roof was significantly damaged. The tornado was rated an EF1, the first tornado in the state of Delaware to be rated with the Enhanced Fujita scale rather than the Fujita scale, which had been used to rate tornadoes up until February 1, 2007. The tornado's estimated maximum wind speed was 95 mph (153 km/h) with a maximum path width of 80 yd (73 m).
- September 3, 2012 – A weak and short-lived EF0 tornado touched down in a residential subdivision in Camden, a suburb of Dover, with a maximum estimated wind speed of 85 mph (137 km/h). The tornado damaged around 16 houses, six of which were left uninhabitable after. A garage was unroofed, damaging the cars inside, and additionally damaging one side of the house. Thousands of people lost power after the tornado. Two people were indirectly injured: one by broken glass and the other being a firefighter attempting to help another resident.
- June 10, 2013 – An EF0 tornado touched down in Newark, causing damage primarily in the Robbscott Manor section. 10 to 20 homes suffered damage, with several suffering significant damage. A large tree fell onto two houses on Natalie Lane, damaging both houses and a car. Several trees were uprooted on Havertown Road as well. The tornado's wind speeds reached a maximum of 80 mph (130 km/h). No injuries or fatalities were reported by this tornado.
- May 22, 2014 – The Storm Prediction Center issued a Slight risk for severe weather, including a 2% tornado risk centered over the Mid-Atlantic. 5 tornadoes touched down in the Mid-Atlantic that day, including an EF3 that touched down west of Schenectady, New York. In Delaware, however, an EF1 tornado embedded within straight-line winds touched down with a maximum wind speed of 105 mph (169 km/h) a few miles east of Chapeltown in Kent County. The tornado was only on the ground for 0.35 mi (0.56 km), lasting about two minutes. 17 houses were damaged, with five of them left uninhabitable. The worst damage occurred on Darling Drive when a mobile home was picked up and flattened. Two people inside suffered injuries from the tornado.
- July 9, 2015 – A weak and short-lived EF0 tornado touched down in the Minquadale area off of DE 9. The first indication of damage was inside a trailer park when eight units inside the trailer park were damaged, leaving six families displaced. A downed transformer went through a house and landed in a bedroom. A telephone pole was sheared off, and multiple trees were knocked down. It struck an industrial park, only causing minor damage to warehouses. It lifted in a nearby park afterwards. 3,700 people across New Castle County lost power, until it was restored the next day.
- June 19, 2017 – A tornado touched down just southeast of Greenwood just west of the Nanticoke River. It caused significant damage to a farm, destroying multiple small barns and carrying their debris into an adjacent farm field. Trees and power poles were damaged, as well as tipping over a nearby irrigation system that weighed about 8,800 lb (4,000 kg). It lifted before crossing Saint Johnstown Road. No injuries or fatalities were reported.
- April 15, 2019 – A tornado outbreak affected parts of the Mid-Atlantic on this day, with two nocturnal tornadoes touching down in Delaware. The first tornado touched down at 3:38 a.m. northwest of Laurel, where it immediately caused EF2 damage, as it destroyed a barn and caused significant damage to the roof of a house. It crossed Woodland Ferry Rd and caused damage to a home. Many trees were uprooted, with some being snapped. It crossed the Delmarva Central Railroad, damaging wood poles along the tracks. The tornado reportedly reached a maximum width of 400 yd (370 m) as it crossed Seaford Rd, as well as destroying a nearby barn. It caused damage to multiple homes and barns before dissipating at around 3:49 a.m. One person was injured by this tornado when a tree fell on their house. It was rated an EF2 with estimated maximum wind speeds of 120 mph (190 km/h). Another tornado spawned by the same storm that produced the Laurel tornado touched down at 4:00 a.m. just north of Harbeson. A few trees were snapped, and a barn on Carpenter Road had been partially unroofed. It intermittently caused damage and crossed a marshy area, until it reached the southern end of Broadkill Beach, where a house suffered minor damage and the circulation moved offshore into the Delaware Bay. It was rated an EF1 with estimated maximum wind speeds of 100 mph (160 km/h).

=== 2020-present ===
- August 4, 2020 – Hurricane Isaias made landfall on the night of August 3rd in North Carolina, and proceeded to make its way up the coast. Isaias spawned 39 confirmed tornadoes, three of which being in the state of Delaware. The first tornado touched down around 8:25 a.m., traversing over mainly open areas in the beginning of its life. It ran parallel to Sandtown Road as it approached Sandtown, where several homes suffered damage, as well as trees being uprooted and snapped. Two homes suffered extensive roof damage, while one of those homes had some windows blown out. It also struck the Sandtown Landfill facility. It dissipated shortly before the Maryland-Delaware border. Another tornado touched down at around the same time as the Sandtown tornado, in the southwestern portion of Milford, a city located in both Sussex and Kent counties. Initially, the tornado was moving to the north-northeast when it first caused damage to some trees. Extensive tree damage occurred until it reached Haven Lake, which separates the two counties. As it crossed Haven Lake, it made a sharp turn from north-northeast to northwest as it crossed into Kent County. It dissipated moments later after crossing Williamsville Road and the Indian River Secondary. Both of these tornadoes were rated an EF1 with maximum wind speeds of 100 mph (160 km/h). The last tornado to touch down currently holds the record for the longest tornado in the state of Delaware, being 35.8 mi (57.6 km) long. It touched down around 8:55 a.m. near an apartment complex in Dover, where significant tree damage began to occur. Trees were toppled, causing damage to roofs. It continued near downtown Dover, narrowly missing the Eden Medical Center, but hitting the William Henry Middle School, where parts of its roof was torn off. A warehouse near the school also suffered substantial damage when some of its metal walls were torn down. It continued past Dover, where intermittent tree damage occurred in mainly rural areas, where it may have possibly lifted. The tornado passed by a DelDOT weather station on DE 1, where a 96 mph (154 km/h) wind gust was recorded. After passing Smyrna to the east, it crossed into New Castle County, while continuing to run parallel to DE 1. Houses on Blackbird Landing Road and Gum Bush Road in Townsend had their roofs damaged, and a garage was destroyed. Along a neighborhood on Spring Hollow Road in Middletown, one house in the neighborhood had a side wall completely blown off. It continued northward to the Summit Bridge area where it peaked in intensity, causing significant damage to several homes. Two houses suffered extensive damage to their roof. It then crossed the Chesapeake & Delaware Canal into the Bear area, where hundreds of trees were uprooted and multiple homes suffered significant damage, rendering some uninhabitable. It dissipated just southwest of Glasgow at around 9:30 a.m. This tornado was rated an EF2 with estimated maximum wind speeds of 115 mph (185 km/h). No injuries or fatalities were reported by tornadoes in the state of Delaware.
- August 7, 2020 – Just three days after Hurricane Isaias spawned three tornadoes in the state, severe thunderstorms triggered both extensive straight-line winds and a tornado to spawn in the northern part of New Castle County near Ashland. Some trees were downed on Pyles Ford Rd, leading to it being closed. One tree snapped and landed on the roof of a house. Continuing on an easterly path, many more trees were uprooted, leading to multiple road closures in the area. The tornado then impacted the Wilmington Country Club, where hundreds of trees suffered varying degrees of damage, as far as a few trees being uprooted. The tornado dissipated shortly afterwards near Montchanin. It was rated a high-end EF1 with winds of up to 105 mph (169 km/h). South of the tornado track, the Wilmington and Greenville area suffered from extensive straight-line wind damage of up to 95 mph (153 km/h). Although the tree damage from the straight-line winds looked similar to the tornado damage, the damage was not extensive enough. Had the straight-line winds been more extensive, the National Weather Service would have changed it from 95 to 100 mph.
- July 1, 2021 – A broken line of severe thunderstorms crossed into Delaware, including one severe thunderstorm that would spawn two tornadoes, one in Kent and one in Sussex counties. The first tornado touched down on Farmington Road in Farmington, where minor damage occurred to a house. The tornado maintained a eastward direction as it crossed DE 13, damaging the metal roof of a business on that road. A tree fell on the roof of a house causing some damage. Numerous trees were snapped along the path of the tornado, dissipating a few miles south of Houston. It was rated an EF1. That same severe thunderstorm would eventually cross into Sussex County, spawning another tornado just east of Milford, where it immediately started uprooting trees. A porch roof on Shockley Road was uplifted, and another residence's TV antenna was bent. Trees continued to be uprooted, with one falling on a shed, destroying it. Damage to vehicles due to uprooted trees also occurred. The roofing of a pole barn was damaged and thrown into a nearby corn field. The tornado then traversed marshy areas before approaching Slaughter Beach. However, the tornado had weakened by the time it could cause much damage. A Delaware Environmental Observing System (DEOS) mesonet site reported a gust of 62 mph (100 km/h) in Slaughter Beach. This tornado was also rated an EF1.
  A house shifted off its foundation in Greenwood, Delaware, caused by an EF3 tornado on April 1, 2023. This tornado is tied for the strongest tornado in the state's history.
- April 1, 2023 – A squall line that previously caused severe damage and numerous tornadoes across the Midwestern and Southern parts of the United States the day prior moved into the area, spawning a low-end EF3 with estimated maximum wind speeds of 140 mph (230 km/h). The tornado touched down at 5:59 p.m. a few miles northwest of Bridgeville, near the intersection of Polk Road and Dublin Hill Road. The first indication of damage was near that same intersection when part of a barn's roof was removed. A free standing pole was bent and an electric transmission line pole was broken, both being indicators of high-end EF1 damage. Trees were uprooted and snapped as the tornado continued to grow larger and cross DE 404. More trees were uprooted and a mobile home suffered minor roof damage. A two-story house on Precious Lane collapsed after sliding off of its foundation. The National Weather Service in Mount Holly/Philadelphia issued a Tornado Warning for northwestern Sussex County and south central Kent county at 6:01 p.m. It continued through the unincorporated community of Cocked Hat, where it crossed the Delmarva Central Railroad. The tornado reached its peak intensity around here, as it destroyed several wooden and two steel high tension power poles. It then struck the DelDOT Bridgeville Maintenance Facility on Newton Rd, causing significant damage to multiple buildings. The exterior wall of a garage was blown out, and a building that stored road salt was completely unroofed. Continuing on, a Delaware Environmental Observing System (DEOS) mesonet station reported a gust of 98 mph (158 km/h). It then crossed DE 13, where dozens of trees suffered some form of damage. It then crossed Sugar Hill Road, and entered the town of Greenwood, where a house's roof was nearly entirely torn off, as well as exterior walls suffering damage. 2 irrigation pivots were tipped over as it passed over mainly rural areas. It then struck a residential area on Fawn Road, where one house slid off its foundation and collapsed. Other houses in the area were damaged to a lesser extent. Damage also occurred on Quail Hollow Road, including a severely damaged garage and a bent metal pole. It then continued on Tuckers Road, where it reached its widest point of 700 yd (640 m). Several buildings experienced high-end EF1 to low-end EF2 damage, including a house that slid off its foundation and collapsed. One person was killed inside the collapsed home. Another house down the road had parts of their roof removed, and a small barn had their roof panels completely removed. The tornado remained over mainly wooded areas past Tuckers Road, where trees and homes sustained consistent damage. The tornado then proceeded to enter Ellendale, damaging two homes on Beaver Run Road. Multiple homes in a residential area near US 113 were damaged, including a garage that had been destroyed. As it neared Ellendale, the tornado began to weaken considerably. Trees were uprooted or had large branches torn off, and homes only suffered light damage. The tornado passed east of Ellendale and dissipated at 6:19 p.m., being on the ground for 20 minutes. The tornado tied or broke multiple records, including tying the tornado from 1961 as the strongest tornado in state history, and becoming the widest tornado in state history. It was also the first time there was a tornado-related fatality since the Hartly tornado 39 years prior. Nine more tornadoes touched down in the Northeast that day.
- July 9, 2023 – A brief tornado associated with showers and thunderstorms touched down roughly 4 miles northwest of Middletown in New Castle County. Damage associated with the rear flank downdraft was noted prior to the tornado touching down roughly 200 yards to the southeast. The tornado touched down at approximately 4:49 p.m. where a couple of softwood trees were uprooted near the intersection of Boyds Corner Road and Bayberry Parkway. The tornado then tracked northwest where it would strike a nearby residential neighborhood. The most significant damage was done to a house on Bullen Drive, where a garage roof was torn off the house and a wall was pushed outward from the house but didn't collapse. In total, the tornado tracked for 1.19 miles and had a maximum width of 200 yards. This tornado was rated EF1.
- September 11, 2023 – A boundary off the coast led to a brief tornado that touched down near Adams Road in Dagsboro, where it first damaged three homes. Two sheds suffered significant damage. Large softwood trees on Adams Road and Wild Goose Way were uprooted. The tornado dissipated after crossing Piney Neck Road and was rated a high-end EF0 with maximum estimated wind speeds of 85 mph (137 km/h).
- August 8, 2024 – The remnants of Hurricane Debby moved up the coast, bringing torrential rainfall to the state and spawning a brief tornado in the Stanton area of New Castle County. The tornado touched down at 7:11 p.m., where trees were uprooted and snapped. It then crossed DE 2 and struck the Kirkwood Plaza Shopping Center, where a supermarket lost part of its roof. It continued into a residential area, snapping a wood pole and uprooting multiple trees in the Sherwood Park area. It dissipated at 7:13 p.m. It was rated an EF1 with maximum wind speeds of 95 mph (153 km/h), and caused no injuries or fatalities. It was the first tornado in Delaware to have a Particularly Dangerous Situation (PDS) tag used during a Tornado Warning issued by the National Weather Service.
- May 16, 2025 – A high-end EF1 tornado touched down near Rhodesdale in Dorchester County, Maryland. It caused significant damage to trees and farm buildings while in Maryland, later crossing into Delaware, with the only damage in Delaware being inflicted on trees. The tornado dissipated in the Broad Creek area.
- March 16, 2026 – A squall line crossed the area in the late evening, spawning an EF1 tornado in Kent County. The tornado touched down near Carpenter Bridge Road in Frederica. It ran parallel to Fork Landing Road, where it snapped and uprooted trees. One tree fell onto a shed and destroyed it.
- August 20, 2026 – Two EF1s and one EF0 touched down in Kent County. The first tornado was an EF1 touched down at around 5:54 p.m. south of Marydel, where damage was mostly confined to trees. Two large trees were uprooted, with one falling on the corner of a house. A barn and shed on Parkers Chapel Road were destroyed. The second tornado was a brief EF0 that touched down in Hazlettville. The tornado struck an open air barn, blowing off half of the roof's metal panels. Convergent swirl marks were noted throughout the tornado's life as it mostly remained over open fields. The final tornado was an EF1 with estimated maximum wind speeds of 110 mph (180 km/h). It touched down outside of a residential neighborhood in the far western portion of Dover. The tornado quickly intensified and hit Schutte Park, where it struck the Dover Little League baseball fields, causing extensive damage. Several lighting fixtures were damaged, and two scoreboards were damaged. It struck a generating station just east of the baseball fields, where trailers were flipped over. Continuing on to the northeast, the tornado then hit the southeastern corner of the Kraft Heinz manufacturing facility. The tornado likely reached its peak intensity near this location. The exterior walls made of concrete bricks collapsed, portions of the metal roof were removed, and trailers were flipped over. The tornado then approached downtown Dover as it shifted more to the east. By this point, the tornado had slightly weakened. It only caused damage to trees as it went through downtown. The tornado shifted to the north and had gained intensity once more. Trees on Lewis Mill Road were uprooted, leading to the road becoming blocked. Shortly afterwards, the tornado knocked down business signs and struck two motels off of DE 13. One motel lost half of their roof, another indicator of high-end EF1 damage. The tornado rapidly weakened, then lifted before it could cross DE 13. The tornado was on the ground for 3.2 mi (5.1 km). Due to the significant amount of damage, a state of emergency was declared for Dover. Eight more tornadoes spawned across the Mid-Atlantic on that day. No injuries or fatalities were reported in the state of Delaware.

== Climatological statistics ==
The following is a chart showing tornadoes by the month or decade that they touched down in.

Tornadoes in Delaware by month
Month	№ of tornadoes
January	1
February	0
March	5
April	8
May	5
June	12
July	22
August	17
September	8
October	3
November	2
December	0

Tornadoes in Delaware by decade
Decade	№ of tornadoes
1950s	5
1960s	8
1970s	14
1980s	10
1990s	19
2000s	2
2010s	9
2020s	16

=== Tornadoes by county ===
The following is a chart showing tornadoes by the county, based on the county that it touched down in. The Enhanced Fujita Scale replaced the Fujita Scale on February 1, 2007.

Tornadoes in Delaware by County (Note: The tornado on June 7, 1988 was in both New Castle and Kent counties. A tornado on August 4, 2020 was in both Sussex and Kent counties.)
County	F/EFU	F/EF0	F/EF1	F/EF2	F/EF3	Total
Kent	0	8	14	5	0	27
New Castle	2	8	10	6	1	27
Sussex	0	11	13	3	1	28
Total	2	27	37	14	2	82

== See also ==
- List of Delaware hurricanes
- List of New Jersey tornadoes
- Enhanced Fujita scale
- List of North American tornadoes and tornado outbreaks
