= Owens Branch (West Branch Gum Branch tributary) =

Stream in Delaware, USA

Owens Branch Tributary to West Branch Gum Branch
- Location of Owens Branch mouth Owens Branch (West Branch Gum Branch tributary) (the United States)

Location
- Country: United States
- State: Delaware
- County: Sussex

Physical characteristics
- Source: Crony Pond Branch divide
  - location: Owens, Delaware
  - coordinates: 38°48′07″N 075°31′47″W
  - elevation: 50 ft (15 m)
- Mouth: West Branch Gum Branch
  - location: about 4 miles northeast of Greenwood, Delaware
  - coordinates: 38°46′08″N 075°32′20″W
  - elevation: 30 ft (9.1 m)
- Length: 2.72 mi (4.38 km)
- Basin size: 1.86 square miles (4.8 km^{2})
- Discharge
  - location: West Branch Gum Branch
  - average: 2.31 cu ft/s (0.065 m^{3}/s) at mouth with West Branch Gum Branch

Basin features
- Progression: West Branch Gum Branch → Gum Branch → Nanticoke River → Chesapeake Bay → Atlantic Ocean
- River system: Nanticoke River
- Tributaries
  - left: unnamed tributaries
  - right: unnamed tributaries
- Bridges: Hunters Cove Road, Tuckers Road

Owens Branch is a 2.72 mi (4.38 km) long 1st order tributary to West Branch Gum Branch in Sussex County, Delaware.

== Course ==
Owens Branch rises at Owens, Delaware and then flows south to join West Branch Gum Branch about 4 miles northeast of Greenwood.

== Watershed ==
Owens Branch drains 1.86 square miles (4.8 km^{2}) of area, receives about 45.3 in/year of precipitation, has a topographic wetness index of 680.04 and is about 9% forested.

== See also ==
- List of Delaware rivers
