= Stallion Head Branch =

Stream in Delaware, USA

Stallion Head Branch Tributary to Gum Branch
- Location of Stallion Head Branch mouth Stallion Head Branch (the United States)

Location
- Country: United States
- State: Delaware
- County: Sussex

Physical characteristics
- Source: Johnson Branch divide
  - location: about 1.5 miles southeast of Staytonville, Delaware
  - coordinates: 38°49′32″N 075°30′02″W
  - elevation: 50 ft (15 m)
- Mouth: Gum Branch
  - location: about 0.75 miles southwest of Oakley, Delaware
  - coordinates: 38°49′25″N 075°30′02″W
  - elevation: 38 ft (12 m)
- Length: 2.16 mi (3.48 km)
- Basin size: 1.26 square miles (3.3 km^{2})
- Discharge
  - location: Gum Branch
  - average: 1.38 cu ft/s (0.039 m^{3}/s) at mouth with Gum Branch

Basin features
- Progression: Gum Branch → Nanticoke River → Chesapeake Bay → Atlantic Ocean
- River system: Nanticoke River
- Tributaries
  - left: unnamed tributaries
  - right: unnamed tributaries
- Bridges: Century Farm Road, DE 16, Oak Road

Stallion Head Branch is a 3.16 mi (5.09 km) long 1st tributary to Gum Branch in Sussex County, Delaware. This is the only stream of this name in the United States.

== Course ==
Stallion Head Branch rises about 1.5 miles southeast of Staytonville, Delaware and then flows south to join Gum Branch about 0.75 miles southwest of Oakley, Delaware.

== Watershed ==
Stallion Head Branch drains 1.26 square miles (3.3 km^{2}) of area, receives about 45.4 in/year of precipitation, has a topographic wetness index of 757.38 and is about 4% forested.

== See also ==
- List of Delaware rivers
