= Delaware Route 36 =

State highway in Sussex County, Delaware, United States

Delaware Route 36

Route information
- Maintained by DelDOT
- Length: 23.28 mi (37.47 km)
- Existed: 1938–present
- Tourist routes: Delaware Bayshore Byway

Major junctions
- West end: DE 404 in Scotts Corner
- DE 16 in Greenwood; US 13 in Greenwood; US 113 in Milford; DE 1 Bus. in Milford; DE 1 east of Milford
- East end: Cedar Creek bridge in Slaughter Beach

Location
- Country: United States
- State: Delaware
- Counties: Sussex

Highway system
- Delaware State Route System; List; Byways
← DE 34	→ DE 37

Delaware Route 36 (DE 36) is a state highway in Sussex County, Delaware. It runs in a generally northeast–southwest direction from DE 404 in Scotts Corner east to Slaughter Beach, a town along the Delaware Bay. The road runs through the northern portion of Sussex County, passing through rural areas along with Greenwood and Milford. The route intersects DE 16 and U.S. Route 13 (US 13) in Greenwood and US 113, DE 1 Business (DE 1 Bus.), and DE 1 in Milford. DE 36 was built as a state highway in stages during the 1920s and 1930s. The road was designated by 1938 from DE 16 east of Greenwood east to Fort Saulsbury (present-day Slaughter Beach) and was extended west to DE 404 by 1994.

== Route description ==
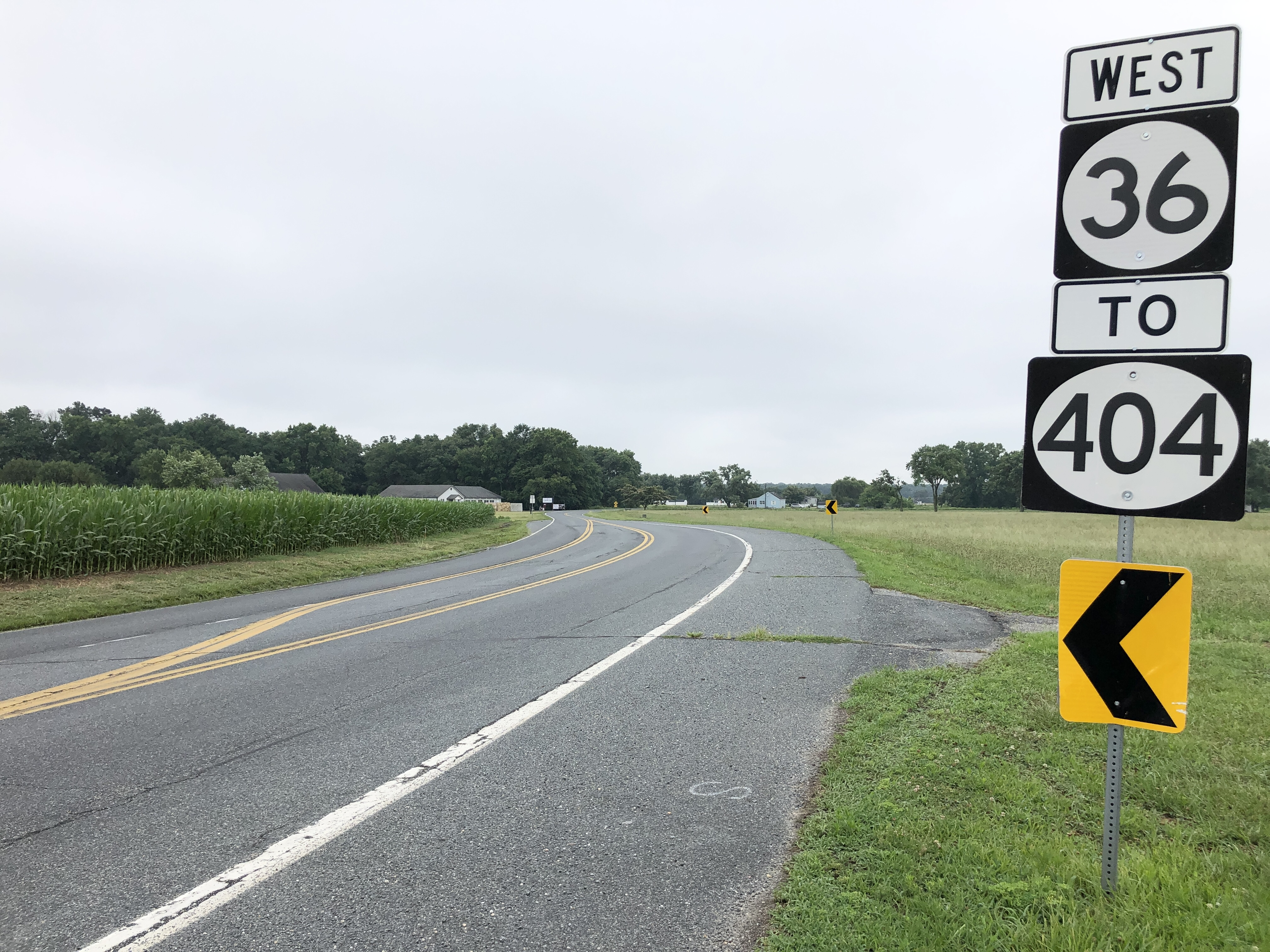
DE 36 westbound past DE 16 west of Greenwood

DE 36 begins at an intersection with DE 404 in Scotts Corner, heading to the northeast on two-lane undivided Scotts Store Road. The road runs through a mix of farmland and woodland with some homes, coming to a junction with DE 16. At this point, DE 16 turns east to become concurrent with DE 36 on Hickman Road. The road enters the town of Greenwood and becomes Market Street, passing several homes along with a few businesses. The highway crosses the Delmarva Central Railroad's Delmarva Subdivision line at-grade before it intersects US 13 on the eastern edge of Greenwood. Past this intersection, DE 16/DE 36 leaves Greenwood and becomes Beach Highway, crossing the Nanticoke River.

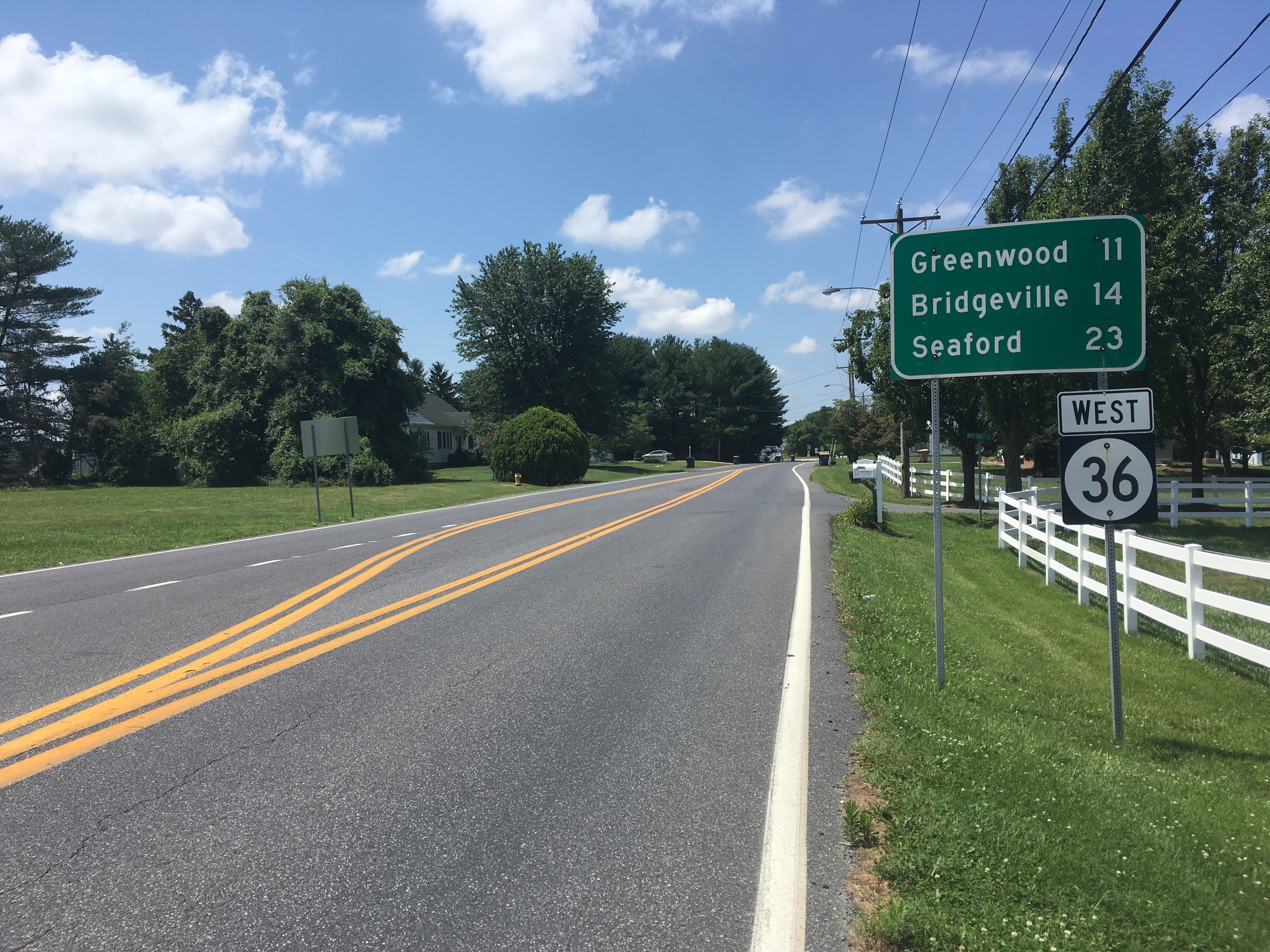
DE 36 westbound past US 113 in Milford

In Saint Johnstown, the road becomes a divided highway and DE 36 splits from DE 16 by turning to the northeast onto two-lane undivided Shawnee Road. The road heads through agricultural areas with some woods and homes, passing through the community of Staytonville. Farther northeast, the road reaches the city of Milford. Upon reaching Milford, the route runs through residential areas and intersects US 113. Past this intersection, DE 36 becomes Lakeview Avenue. The road forms the eastern border of Silver Lake, a lake along the Mispillion River, and crosses the Delmarva Central Railroad's Indian River Subdivision line at-grade northwest of the former Milford station. After this, DE 36 continues to the east on Causey Avenue past homes and businesses. In the downtown area of Milford, the route turns north onto two-lane divided Walnut Street briefly before it heads east on two-lane undivided Southeast Front Street. The route passes through the residential eastern part of Milford where it intersects DE 1 Bus.

DE 36 leaves Milford and heads to the northeast on Cedar Beach Road, entering a mix of farmland, woodland, and homes. The road turns to the east, running a short distance to the south of the Mispillion River as it comes to a diamond interchange with the DE 1 bypass of Milford. Past this interchange, the route continues to the northeast. DE 36 winds east through a mix of farmland and marshland and comes to a drawbridge over the Cedar Creek just outside the town of Slaughter Beach. The DE 36 designation ends here, but the road continues past the drawbridge into Slaughter Beach where it becomes Bay Avenue and turns south to run along the Delaware Bay.

The section of the route between Maple Avenue in Milford and Slaughter Beach is designated as part of the Delaware Bayshore Byway, a Delaware Byway and National Scenic Byway. DE 36 has an annual average daily traffic count ranging from a high of 9,681 vehicles at the eastern edge of Greenwood to a low of 1,854 vehicles at the eastern border of Milford.

== History ==
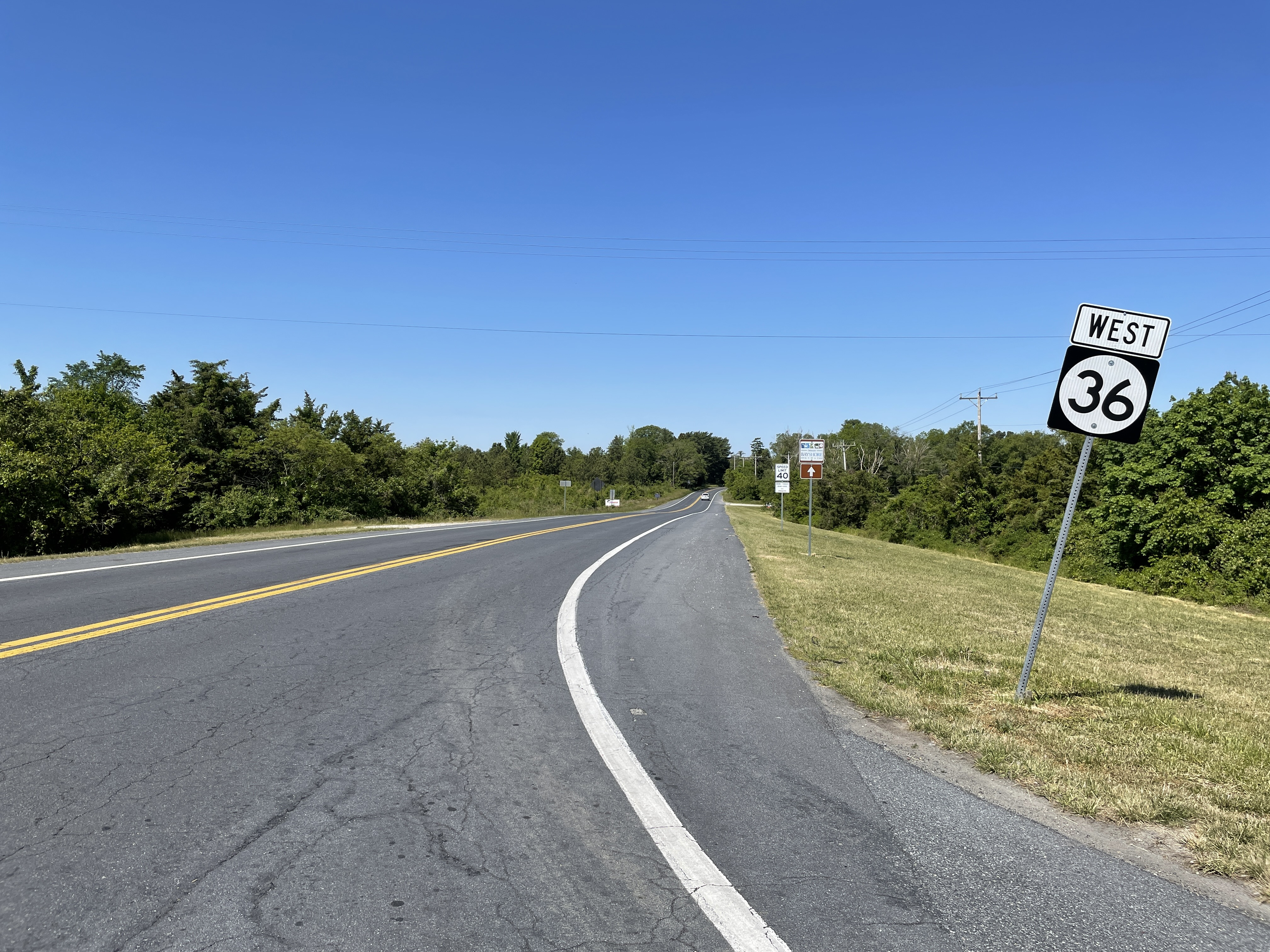
DE 36 westbound past DE 1 in Milford

By 1920, a section of present-day DE 36 southwest of Milford was completed as a state highway while a portion leading further northeast into Milford was under contract as one; the remainder of the route existed as an unimproved county road. The section leading into Milford was completed four years later, in addition to the segment of the road through Greenwood. A year later, the state highway was under proposal between Greenwood and southwest of Milford. The state highway between Greenwood and Milford was finished in 1929. All of current DE 36 was completed by 1931 except for the easternmost part of the road. DE 36 was designated to follow its current alignment between DE 16 east of Greenwood and Fort Saulsbury (now Slaughter Beach) by 1938, with the entire route paved except for the part near Fort Saulsbury. The unpaved portion was paved a year later. DE 36 was extended westward to its current terminus at DE 404 by 1994.

== Major intersections ==
The entire route is in Sussex County.

Location	mi	km	Destinations	Notes
Scotts Corner	0.00	0.00	DE 404 (Seashore Highway) – Bridgeville, Denton, Bay Bridge	Western terminus
Greenwood	3.60	5.79	DE 16 west (Hickman Road) – Bay Bridge	West end of DE 16 overlap
Greenwood	5.08	8.18	US 13 (Sussex Highway) – Harrington, Dover, Bridgeville, Seaford	
Saint Johnstown	5.58	8.98	DE 16 east (Beach Highway) – Milton	East end of DE 16 overlap
Milford	15.85	25.51	US 113 (Dupont Boulevard) – Dover, Ellendale	
Milford	17.56	28.26	DE 1 Bus. (South Rehoboth Boulevard) – Milton	
Milford			DE 1 (Milford Bypass) – Dover, Wilmington, Lewes, Rehoboth Beach	Interchange
Slaughter Beach	23.28	37.47	Cedar Creek bridge	Eastern terminus
1.000 mi = 1.609 km; 1.000 km = 0.621 mi: Concurrency terminus
