= Crony Pond Branch =

Stream in Delaware, USA

Crony Pond Branch Tributary to Toms Dam Branch
- Location of Crony Pond Branch mouth Crony Pond Branch (the United States)

Location
- Country: United States
- State: Delaware
- County: Sussex

Physical characteristics
- Source: West Branch Gum Branch divide
  - location: Owens, Delaware
  - coordinates: 38°48′29″N 075°31′37″W
  - elevation: 50 ft (15 m)
- Mouth: Toms Dam Branch
  - location: about 0.5 miles east of St. Johnstown, Delaware
  - coordinates: 38°48′28″N 075°33′13″W
  - elevation: 46 ft (14 m)
- Length: 1.49 mi (2.40 km)
- Basin size: 0.57 square miles (1.5 km^{2})
- Discharge
  - location: Toms Dam Branch
  - average: 0.71 cu ft/s (0.020 m^{3}/s) at mouth with Toms Dam Branch

Basin features
- Progression: west
- River system: Nanticoke River
- Tributaries
  - left: unnamed tributaries
  - right: unnamed tributaries
- Bridges: none

Crony Pond Branch is a 1.44 mi (2.32 km) long 1st order tributary to Toms Dam Branch in Sussex County, Delaware. This is the only stream of this name in the United States.

== Course ==
Crony Pond Branch rises in Owens, Delaware and then flows west to join Toms Dam Branch about 0.5 miles east of St. Johnstown.

== Watershed ==
Crony Pond Branch drains 0.57 square miles (1.5 km^{2}) of area, receives about 45.4 in/year of precipitation, has a topographic wetness index of 677.03 and is about 9% forested.

== See also ==
- List of Delaware rivers
