= Hickman, Delaware =

Unincorporated community in Delaware, United States

- Unincorporated community
- Location within Delaware Location within the United States
- Coordinates: 38°49′59″N 75°43′22″W
- Country: United States
- State: Delaware
- County: Kent
- Elevation: 52 ft (16 m)
- Time zone: UTC-5 (Eastern (EST))
  - Summer (DST): UTC-4 (EDT)
- Area code: 302
- GNIS feature ID: 214090

Hickman is an unincorporated community in Kent County, Delaware, United States. Hickman is located along Delaware Route 16 at the border with Caroline County, Maryland and just north of the Sussex County border, northwest of Greenwood.

The citizens of the town of Hickman were once recognized by the TV show Hee Haw. In fact, the Hickman segment is the episode featured in the comedy wing of the Country Music Hall of Fame.

The American Discovery Trail runs through the village.

== See also ==
- Hickman, Maryland
