= Long Branch (Toms Dam Branch tributary) =

Stream in Delaware, USA

Long Branch Tributary to Toms Dam Branch
- Location of Toms Dam Branch mouth Long Branch (Toms Dam Branch tributary) (the United States)

Location
- Country: United States
- State: Delaware
- County: Sussex

Physical characteristics
- Source: Nanticoke River divide
  - location: about 0.5 miles northeast of Greenwood, Delaware
  - coordinates: 38°48′32″N 075°34′20″W
  - elevation: 52 ft (16 m)
- Mouth: Toms Dam Branch
  - location: about 1 mile southeast of St. Johnstown, Delaware
  - coordinates: 38°48′32″N 075°34′20″W
  - elevation: 36 ft (11 m)
- Length: 2.17 mi (3.49 km)
- Basin size: 1.12 square miles (2.9 km^{2})
- Discharge
  - location: Toms Dam Branch
  - average: 1.39 cu ft/s (0.039 m^{3}/s) at mouth with Toms Dam Branch

Basin features
- Progression: generally south
- River system: Nanticoke River
- Tributaries
  - left: unnamed tributaries
  - right: unnamed tributaries
- Bridges: PA 36, PA 16

Long Branch is a 2.17 mi (3.49 km) long 1st order tributary to Toms Dam Branch in Sussex County, Delaware.

== Course ==
Long Branch rises about 0.5 miles northeast of Greenwood, Delaware and then flows south to join Toms Dam Branch about 1 mile southeast of St. Johnstown.

== Watershed ==
Long Branch drains 1.12 square miles (2.9 km^{2}) of area, receives about 45.2 in/year of precipitation, has a topographic wetness index of 830.08 and is about 7% forested.

== See also ==
- List of Delaware rivers
