= Slaughter Creek (Cedar Creek tributary) =

Stream in Delaware, USA

Slaughter Creek Tributary to Cedar Creek
- Location of Slaughter Creek mouth Slaughter Creek (Cedar Creek tributary) (the United States)

Location
- Country: United States
- State: Delaware
- County: Sussex

Physical characteristics
- Source: Church Branch and North Prong divide
  - location: about 0.25 miles northwest of Jefferson Crossroads, Delaware
  - coordinates: 38°50′47″N 075°20′58″W
  - elevation: 0 ft (0 m)
- Mouth: Cedar Creek
  - location: about 0.25 miles west of Slaughter Beach, Delaware
  - coordinates: 38°55′16″N 075°19′36″W
  - elevation: 32 ft (9.8 m)
- Length: 9.92 mi (15.96 km)
- Basin size: 15.88 square miles (41.1 km^{2})
- Discharge
  - location: Cedar Creek
  - average: 19.48 cu ft/s (0.552 m^{3}/s) at mouth with Cedar Creek

Basin features
- Progression: Cedar Creek → Delaware Bay → Atlantic Ocean
- River system: Cedar Creek
- Tributaries
  - left: Draper-Bennett Ditch
  - right: Old Slaughter Creek
- Bridges: DE 1, Draper Road, Slaughter Beach Road (DE 36)

Slaughter Creek is a 9.92 mi (15.96 km) long 3rd order tributary to Cedar Creek in Sussex County, Delaware.

== Variant names ==
According to the Geographic Names Information System, it has also been known historically as:

- Slaughter Beach Canal
- Slaughter Neck Ditch

== Course ==
Slaughter Creek rises on the Church Branch and North Prong divide about 0.25 miles northwest of Jefferson Crossroads, Delaware. Slaughter Creek then flows east and makes a turn northwest to meet Cedar Creek west of Slaughter Beach.

== Watershed ==
Slaughter Creek drains 15.88 square miles (41.1 km^{2}) of area, receives about 45.5 in/year of precipitation, has a topographic wetness index of 798.73 and is about 4% forested.
