= Parker Branch (Gum Branch tributary) =

Stream in Delaware, USA

Parker Branch Tributary to Gum Branch
- Location of Parker Branch mouth Parker Branch (Gum Branch tributary) (the United States)

Location
- Country: United States
- State: Delaware
- County: Sussex

Physical characteristics
- Source: Beaver Dam Branch divide
  - location: about 2 miles west-southwest of Ellendale, Delaware
  - coordinates: 38°48′17″N 075°29′06″W
  - elevation: 45 ft (14 m)
- Mouth: Gum Branch
  - location: about 3 miles southwest of Ellendale, Delaware
  - coordinates: 38°46′34″N 075°30′43″W
  - elevation: 36 ft (11 m)
- Length: 3.21 mi (5.17 km)
- Basin size: 2.35 square miles (6.1 km^{2})
- Discharge
  - location: Gum Branch
  - average: 2.94 cu ft/s (0.083 m^{3}/s) at mouth with Gum Branch

Basin features
- Progression: Gum Branch → Nanticoke River → Chesapeake Bay → Atlantic Ocean
- River system: Nanticoke River
- Tributaries
  - left: unnamed tributaries
  - right: unnamed tributaries
- Bridges: Oakley Road

Parker Branch is a 3.21 mi (5.17 km) long 1st order tributary to Gum Branch in Sussex County, Delaware.

== Course ==
Parker Branch rises on the Beaver Dam Branch divide about 2 miles west-southwest of Ellendale, Delaware and then flows southwest to join Gum Branch about 3 miles southwest of Ellendale.

== Watershed ==
Parker Branch drains 2.35 square miles (6.1 km^{2}) of area, receives about 45.4 in/year of precipitation, has a topographic wetness index of 738.49 and is about 11% forested.

== See also ==
- List of Delaware rivers
