= Richards Historic District =

Historic district in Delaware, United States

- U.S. National Register of Historic Places
- U.S. Historic district
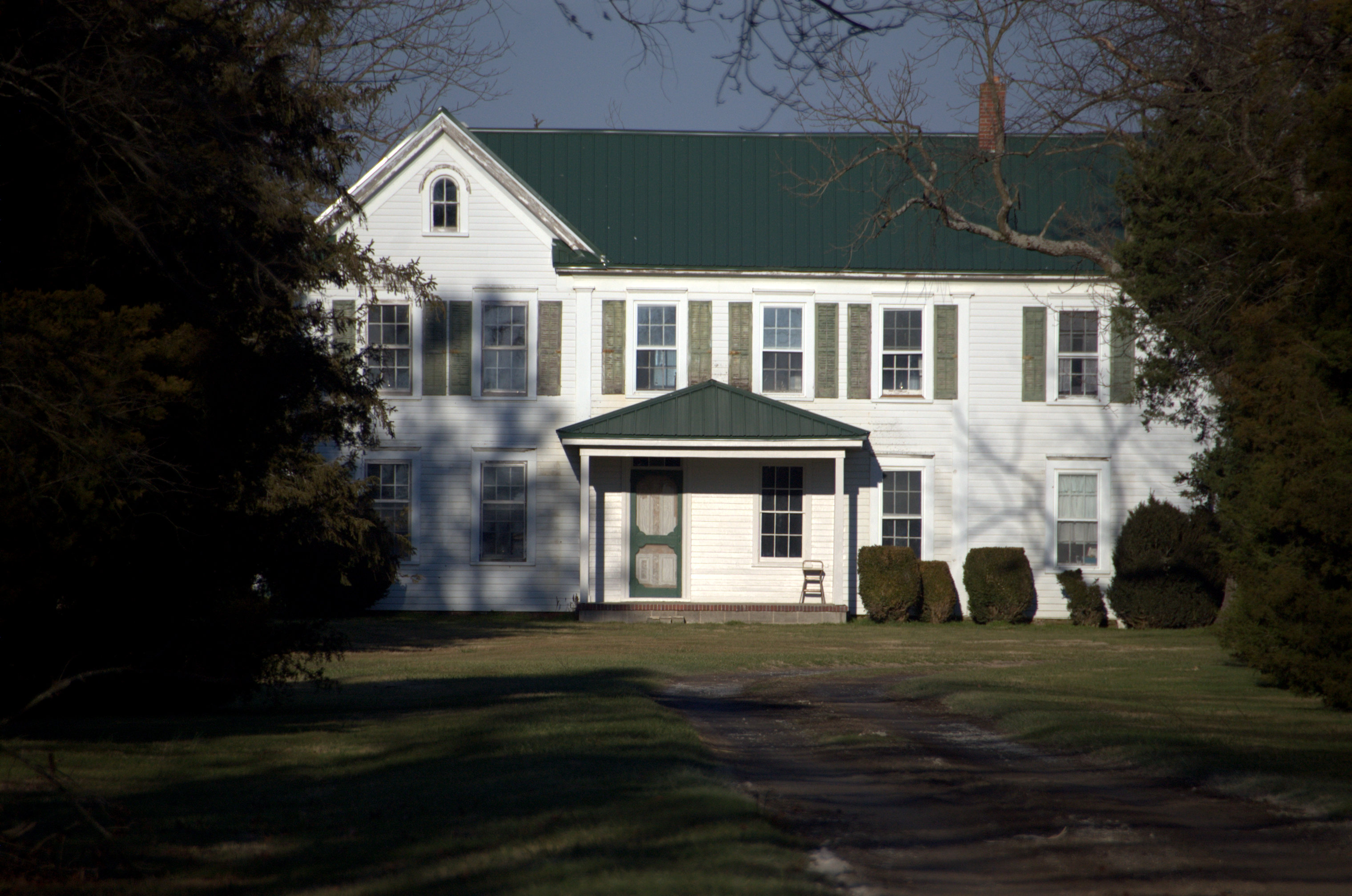
- Middle Space Farm

- Location within Delaware Location within the United States
- Location: Blanchard Rd, Greenwood, Delaware
- Coordinates: 38°47′15″N 75°38′26″W
- Area: 141.1 acres (57.1 ha)
- Built: 1758
- Built by: John Richards
- Architectural style: Italianate, Queen Anne
- NRHP reference No.: 83003522
- Added to NRHP: December 15, 1983

Richards Historic District is a national historic district located in Greenwood, Sussex County, Delaware. The district includes 21 contributing buildings and 1 contributing site encompassing portions of three separate farms with three groupings of farm buildings. The farms are Poplar Level Farm, Locust Grove Farm, and Middle Space Farm. The three houses in the district were constructed by various members of the Richards family between 1758 and 1868. The earliest structure in the district is Poplar Level, the main section of which was built about 1758 by John Richards.

It was added to the National Register of Historic Places in 1983.
