= Cedar Creek (Delaware Bay tributary, Delaware) =

Stream in Delaware, USA

Cedar Creek Tributary to Delaware Bay
- Location of Cedar Creek mouth Cedar Creek (Delaware Bay tributary, Delaware) (the United States)

Location
- Country: United States
- State: Delaware
- County: Sussex; Kent

Physical characteristics
- Source: Gum Branch divide
  - location: about 1 mile west of Hudson Pond Acres, Delaware
  - coordinates: 38°48′57″N 075°27′17″W
  - elevation: 0 ft (0 m)
- Mouth: Delaware Bay
  - location: Mispillion Light, Delaware
  - coordinates: 38°56′52″N 075°18′48″W
  - elevation: 55 ft (17 m)
- Length: 16.09 mi (25.89 km)
- Basin size: 50.01 square miles (129.5 km^{2})
- Discharge
  - location: Delaware Bay
  - average: 61.80 cu ft/s (1.750 m^{3}/s) at mouth with Delaware Bay

Basin features
- Progression: Delaware Bay → Atlantic Ocean
- River system: Delaware Bay
- Tributaries
  - left: Beaverdam Branch
  - right: Church Branch; Slaughter Creek
- Bridges: North Union Church Road, US 113, DE 213, Greentop Road, Clendaniel Pond Road, Fleatown Road, DE 30, DE 1, Bay Avenue (DE 36)

Cedar Creek is a 16.09 mi (25.89 km) long 4th order tributary to Delaware Bay in Sussex and Kent Counties, Delaware.

== Variant names ==
According to the Geographic Names Information System, it has also been known historically as:

- Slaughter Creek

== Course ==
Cedar Creek rises on the Gum Branch divide about 1 mile west of Hudson Pond Acres, Delaware. Cedar Creek then flows northeast to meet Delaware Bay by Mispillion Light.

== Watershed ==
Cedar Creek drains 50.01 square miles (129.5 km^{2}) of area, receives about 45.5 in/year of precipitation, has a topographic wetness index of 694.36 and is about 9% forested.
