= Gully Camp Ditch =

Stream in Delaware, USA

Gully Camp Ditch Tributary to Gum Branch
- Location of Gully Camp Ditch mouth Gully Camp Ditch (the United States)

Location
- Country: United States
- State: Delaware
- County: Sussex

Physical characteristics
- Source: Smith-short and Willin Ditch divide
  - location: about 3 miles east of Bridgeville, Delaware
  - coordinates: 38°44′39″N 075°31′34″W
  - elevation: 42 ft (13 m)
- Mouth: Gum Branch
  - location: about 2 miles east of Bridgeville, Delaware
  - coordinates: 38°44′34″N 075°33′10″W
  - elevation: 20 ft (6.1 m)
- Length: 1.45 mi (2.33 km)
- Basin size: 0.78 square miles (2.0 km^{2})
- Discharge
  - location: Gum Branch
  - average: 0.96 cu ft/s (0.027 m^{3}/s) at mouth with Gum Branch

Basin features
- Progression: Gum Branch → Nanticoke River → Chesapeake Bay → Atlantic Ocean
- River system: Nanticoke River
- Tributaries
  - left: unnamed tributaries
  - right: unnamed tributaries
- Bridges: Oak Road, Apple Tree Road

Gully Camp Ditch is a 1.45 mi (2.33 km) long 1st order tributary to Gum Branch in Sussex County, Delaware. This is the only stream of this name in the United States.

== Course ==
Gully Camp Ditch rises about 3 miles east of Bridgeville, Delaware and then flows west to join Gum Branch about 2 miles east of Bridgeville.

== Watershed ==
Gully Camp Ditch drains 0.78 square miles (2.0 km^{2}) of area, receives about 45.1 in/year of precipitation, has a topographic wetness index of 610.48 and is about 31% forested.

== See also ==
- List of Delaware rivers
