= Broadkill Beach, Delaware =

Unincorporated community in Delaware, United States

- Unincorporated community
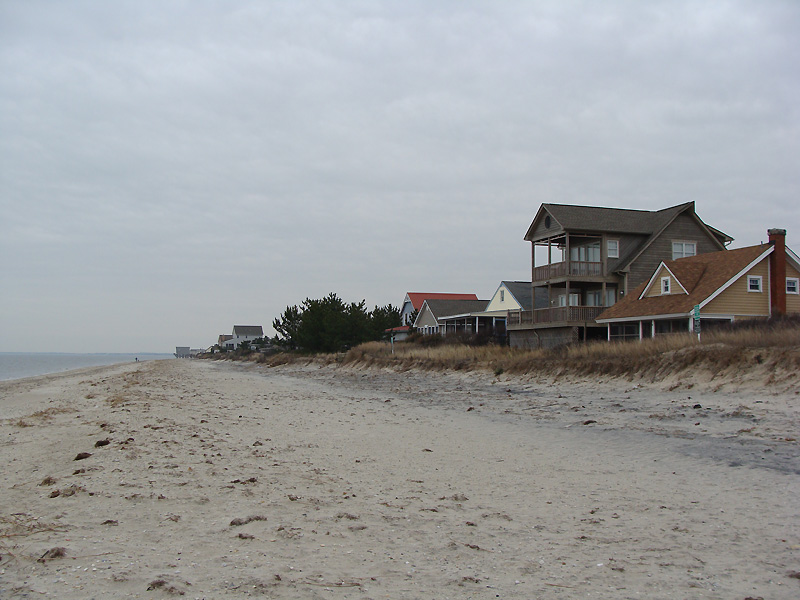
- Broadkill Beach

- Location within the state of Delaware Broadkill Beach, Delaware (the United States)
- Coordinates: 38°49′41″N 75°12′43″W
- Country: United States
- State: Delaware
- County: Sussex
- Elevation: 7 ft (2.1 m)
- Time zone: UTC-5 (Eastern (EST))
  - Summer (DST): UTC-4 (EDT)
- ZIP code: 19968
- Area code: 302
- GNIS feature ID: 213713

Broadkill Beach is an unincorporated beach community in Sussex County, in the U.S. state of Delaware, located on the Delaware Bay north of the mouth of the Broadkill River. It is part of the Salisbury, Maryland-Delaware Metropolitan Statistical Area. The word kill is from the Dutch word kil.

The small community is an increasingly popular vacation destination. It consists primarily of vacation homes, although there are a significant number of year-round residents. During the spring, summer, and fall months, many properties are offered for weekly rentals, or for weekends during off peak seasons. A major beach replenishment project was completed in 2016 which significantly expanded the size of the beach, constructed a large, new dune, and spurred increased interest and investment in the community. Broadkill Beach offers direct waterfront beach access to the Delaware Bay for swimming, kayaking, stand-up paddleboard, surf fishing, and other water-oriented activities. Due to limited public parking, however, the beach remains sparsely populated even on the busiest summer days.

The community is surrounded to the west by Prime Hook National Wildlife Refuge, making it a haven for nature lovers and bird watchers in addition to other wildlife. Broadkill Beach is an official sanctuary for horseshoe crabs, the state marine animal of Delaware and a "signature species" of the Delaware Bay Estuary. Broadkill Beach borders Beach Plum Island Nature Preserve on the south end of Bayshore Drive.

The community offers vacationers a more private, quiet, and less crowded alternative to renting in the larger Delaware beach communities, while still being close to the resort towns and activities. Rehoboth Beach is approximately 20 minutes south of Broadkill Beach. The older section of Broadkill, dating from the mid-20th century, lies just south and north of the intersection of Delaware Route 16 (DE 16) and Bayshore Drive. This area includes cross streets named after presidents (south of DE 16) and Southern and Southwestern states (north of DE 16). Many older, small cottages can be found in this area. Farther north and south along Bayshore Drive are larger, more modern vacation homes. Many first time visitors compare Broadkill Beach's remote feel to the Outer Banks of North Carolina, but much smaller and with easier access to Washington, D.C., Baltimore, and Philadelphia.

The only business located in Broadkill Beach is The Broadkill Store, a general store which sells sandwiches, grocery items, bait & tackle, beach toys, souvenirs and homemade donuts on the weekends. Rentals for kayaks and stand-up paddleboards can also be arranged at the store. A family friendly Fourth of July parade is held by residents in Broadkill Beach each year and with the right views, fireworks from Cape May, NJ, Lewes, Rehoboth Beach and other towns can all be visible.
