= Toms Dam Branch =

Stream in Delaware, USA

Toms Dam Branch Tributary to Gum Branch
- Location of Toms Dam Branch mouth Toms Dam Branch (the United States)

Location
- Country: United States
- State: Delaware
- County: Sussex

Physical characteristics
- Source: Kent-Sussex Line Branch divide
  - location: about 0.5 miles south of Staytonville, Delaware
  - coordinates: 38°50′32″N 075°30′48″W
  - elevation: 55 ft (17 m)
- Mouth: Gum Branch
  - location: about 2 miles east-northeast of Bridgeville, Delaware
  - coordinates: 38°45′17″N 075°33′04″W
  - elevation: 23 ft (7.0 m)
- Length: 8.87 mi (14.27 km)
- Basin size: 10.74 square miles (27.8 km^{2})
- Discharge
  - location: Gum Branch
  - average: 13.36 cu ft/s (0.378 m^{3}/s) at mouth with Gum Branch

Basin features
- Progression: Gum Branch → Nanticoke River → Chesapeake Bay → Atlantic Ocean
- River system: Nanticoke River
- Tributaries
  - left: Crony Pond Branch
  - right: Long Branch
- Bridges: Staytonville Road, Bender Farm Road, Utica Road, Beach Highway, Tuckers Road, Sharps Mill Road

Toms Dam Branch is an 8.87 mi (14.27 km) long 2nd tributary to Gum Branch in Sussex County, Delaware. This is the only stream of this name in the United States.

== Variant names ==
According to the Geographic Names Information System, it has also been known historically as:

- Saint Johnstown Ditch

== Course ==
Toms Dam Branch rises about 0.5 miles south of Staytonville, Delaware and then flows south to join Gum Branch about 2 miles east-northeast of Bridgeville.

== Watershed ==
Toms Dam Branch drains 10.74 square miles (27.8 km^{2}) of area, receives about 45.7 in/year of precipitation, has a topographic wetness index of 742.48 and is about 10% forested.

== See also ==
- List of Delaware rivers
