= Owens Station, Delaware =

Owens, Delaware
- Unincorporated community
- Location within Delaware Location within the United States
- Coordinates: 38°48′20″N 75°31′34″W
- Country: United States
- State: Delaware
- County: Sussex
- Elevation: 52 ft (16 m)
- Time zone: UTC-5 (Eastern (EST))
  - Summer (DST): UTC-4 (EDT)
- Area code: 302
- GNIS feature ID: 216172

Owens Station, Delaware was a community in Delaware, U.S.A.

== History ==
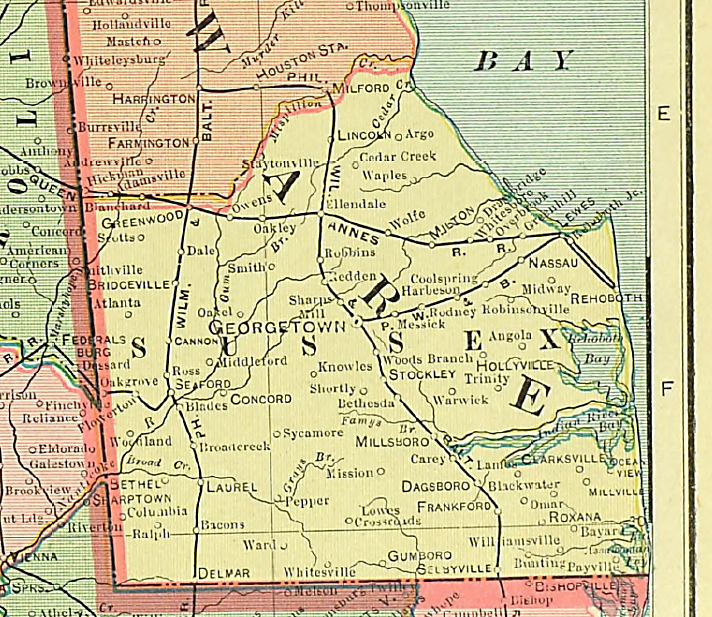
Owens in Sussex County, Delaware, in 1902

Owens station was a stop on the now defunct Queen Anne's Railroad line between Ellendale and Greenwood. After the railroad closed down and the tracks were removed, all property owned by the railroad was returned to its previous landowners and several small communities built around the stops disappeared. Some houses still exist from the town, at the intersection of Beach Highway and Owens Rd, but most of the former town has disappeared.

The Owens Station Hunting Preserve takes its name from the former rail community.

The remains of the settlement, now called simply Owens, is an unincorporated community located on Delaware Route 16 east of Greenwood.

Owens' population was 18 in 1900, and was 62 in 1925.
