= New Market, Delaware =

- Unincorporated community
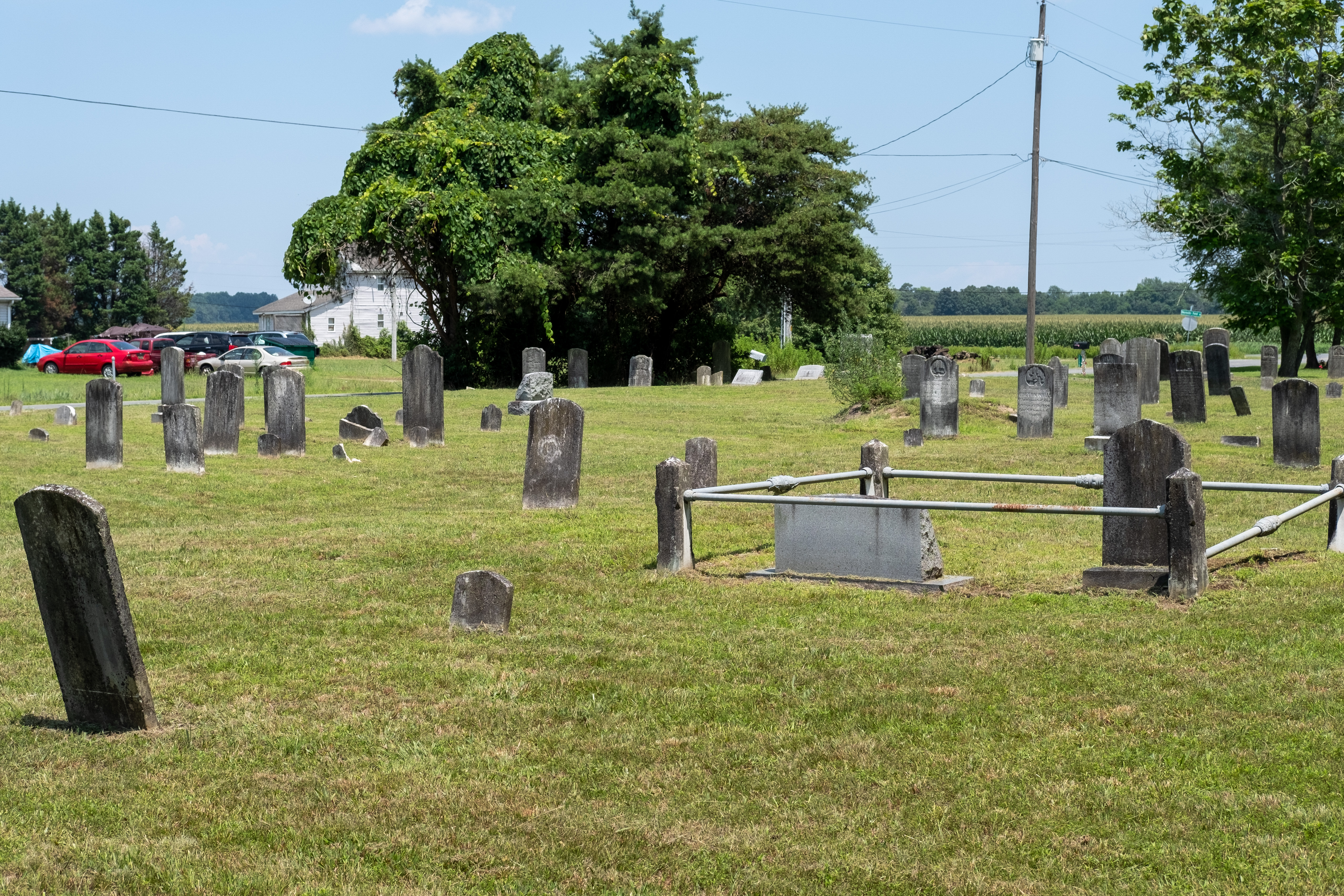
- Cemetery on Reynolds Pond Road

- Location within Delaware Location within the United States
- Coordinates: 38°48′26″N 75°23′49″W
- Country: United States
- State: Delaware
- County: Sussex
- Elevation: 46 ft (14 m)
- Time zone: UTC-5 (Eastern (EST))
  - Summer (DST): UTC-4 (EDT)
- Area code: 302
- GNIS feature ID: 216750

New Market was a small town in the U.S. state of Delaware located between Ellendale and Milton. At the current crossroads of Holly Tree Road and Reynolds Pond Road just east of Ellendale was the New Market Church, around which the town was located.

None of the town exists today, although the cemetery from the church yard is still at the intersection. Some small ranch homes have been built in the area in recent years, but the only namesake to the original town that stood there is New Market Village, a single wide trailer park a quarter mile east of the crossroads.
