= Saint Johnstown, Delaware =

- Unincorporated community
- Location within Delaware
- Coordinates: 38°48′18″N 75°34′32″W
- Country: United States
- State: Delaware
- County: Sussex
- Elevation: 52 ft (16 m)
- Time zone: UTC-5 (Eastern (EST))
  - Summer (DST): UTC-4 (EDT)
- Area code: 302
- GNIS feature ID: 217429

Saint Johnstown, Delaware, USA was a stop on the now defunct Queen Anne's Railroad line between Ellendale and Greenwood. After the railroad closed down and the tracks were removed, all property owned by the railroad was returned to its previous landowners and several small towns built around the stops disappeared.
