= West Branch Gum Branch =

Stream in Delaware, USA

West Branch Gum Branch Tributary to Gum Branch
- Location of West Branch Gum Branch mouth West Branch Gum Branch (the United States)

Location
- Country: United States
- State: Delaware
- County: Sussex

Physical characteristics
- Source: Johnson Branch divide
  - location: about 1 mile southeast of Staytonville, Delaware
  - coordinates: 38°49′40″N 075°30′30″W
  - elevation: 55 ft (17 m)
- Mouth: Gum Branch
  - location: about 2.5 miles east-northeast of Bridgeville, Delaware
  - coordinates: 38°45′53″N 075°32′38″W
  - elevation: 24 ft (7.3 m)
- Length: 5.61 mi (9.03 km)
- Basin size: 5.68 square miles (14.7 km^{2})
- Discharge
  - location: Gum Branch
  - average: 7.07 cu ft/s (0.200 m^{3}/s) at mouth with Gum Branch

Basin features
- Progression: Gum Branch → Nanticoke River → Chesapeake Bay → Atlantic Ocean
- River system: Nanticoke River
- Tributaries
  - left: Owens Branch
  - right: unnamed tributaries
- Bridges: Century Farm Road, DE 16, Wolf Road, Hunters Cove Road, Tuckers Road

West Branch Gum Branch is a 5.61 mi (9.03 km) long 2nd tributary to Gum Branch in Sussex County, Delaware. This is the only stream of this name in the United States.

== Variant names ==
According to the Geographic Names Information System, it has also been known historically as:

- West Branch Ditch

== Course ==
West Branch Gum Branch rises about 1 mile southeast of Staytonville, Delaware and then flows south-southwest to join Gum Branch about 2.5 miles east-northeast of Bridgeville.

== Watershed ==
West Branch Gum Branch drains 5.68 square miles (14.7 km^{2}) of area, receives about 45.4 in/year of precipitation, has a topographic wetness index of 709.85 and is about 15% forested.

== See also ==
- List of Delaware rivers
