= Staytonville, Delaware =

Unincorporated community in Delaware, United States

- Unincorporated community
- Location within Delaware Location within the United States
- Coordinates: 38°50′58″N 75°31′08″W
- Country: United States
- State: Delaware
- County: Sussex
- Elevation: 56 ft (17 m)
- Time zone: UTC-5 (Eastern (EST))
  - Summer (DST): UTC-4 (EDT)
- Area code: 302
- GNIS feature ID: 216227

Staytonville is an unincorporated community in Sussex County, Delaware, United States. Staytonville is located at the intersection of Delaware Route 36, Staytonville Road, and Memory Road northeast of Greenwood.
