= Slaughter Beach, Delaware =

- Town
- Flag Icon

- Location of Slaughter Beach in Sussex County, Delaware.

- Location within the state of Delaware Slaughter Beach (the United States)
- Coordinates: 38°54′46″N 75°18′15″W
- Country: United States
- State: Delaware
- County: Sussex

Government
  - Mayor: Bob Wood

Area
  - Total: 1.44 sq mi (3.74 km^{2})
  - Land: 1.42 sq mi (3.68 km^{2})
  - Water: 0.023 sq mi (0.06 km^{2})
- Elevation: 7 ft (2.1 m)

Population (2020)
  - Total: 218
  - Density: 153.6/sq mi (59.31/km^{2})
- Time zone: UTC−5 (Eastern (EST))
  - Summer (DST): UTC−4 (EDT)
- Area code: 302
- FIPS code: 10-67050
- GNIS feature ID: 214663
- Website: slaughterbeach.delaware.gov

Slaughter Beach is a town in Sussex County, Delaware, United States, located on the southwest shore of Delaware Bay. As of the 2020 census, Slaughter Beach had a population of 218. It is part of the Salisbury, Maryland-Delaware Metropolitan Statistical Area.

== History ==
Slaughter Beach was founded in 1681 and incorporated in 1931. There are at least three stories of where the town's name came from: The first is that it was named after William Slaughter, a local postmaster in the mid-19th century. The second story claims "the name may stem from the annual springtime appearance of hordes of horseshoe crabs that emerge from the waters of Delaware Bay to lay their eggs on the beach. Changing tides leave many crabs stranded, so that they fall victim to the beating sun or marauding foxes and raccoons—hence the name 'Slaughter Beach.'" The third story, and the most contested source of the town's name, stems from a local legend which tells of a man named Brabant who, in the mid-18th century, "slaughtered" several indigenous inhabitants by cannon in order to prevent an impending massacre. In 2018, PETA wrote to the mayor and followed up with a press release requesting the town change its name to "Sanctuary Beach" and offered to help pay for new signage if the name was adopted.

== Mispillion Lighthouse ==
Slaughter Beach was home to the last wooden frame lighthouse in Delaware, the Mispillion Lighthouse. The lighthouse, which overlooked the Mispillion River and Cedar Creek, was established in 1831 with a 65-foot tower. The lighthouse was on the National Register of Historic Places. In 2002 the lighthouse was partially destroyed when it was hit by lightning. The lighthouse was later purchased privately, transported down the bay via barge, and incorporated into a private residence in the town of Lewes.

== Wildlife ==
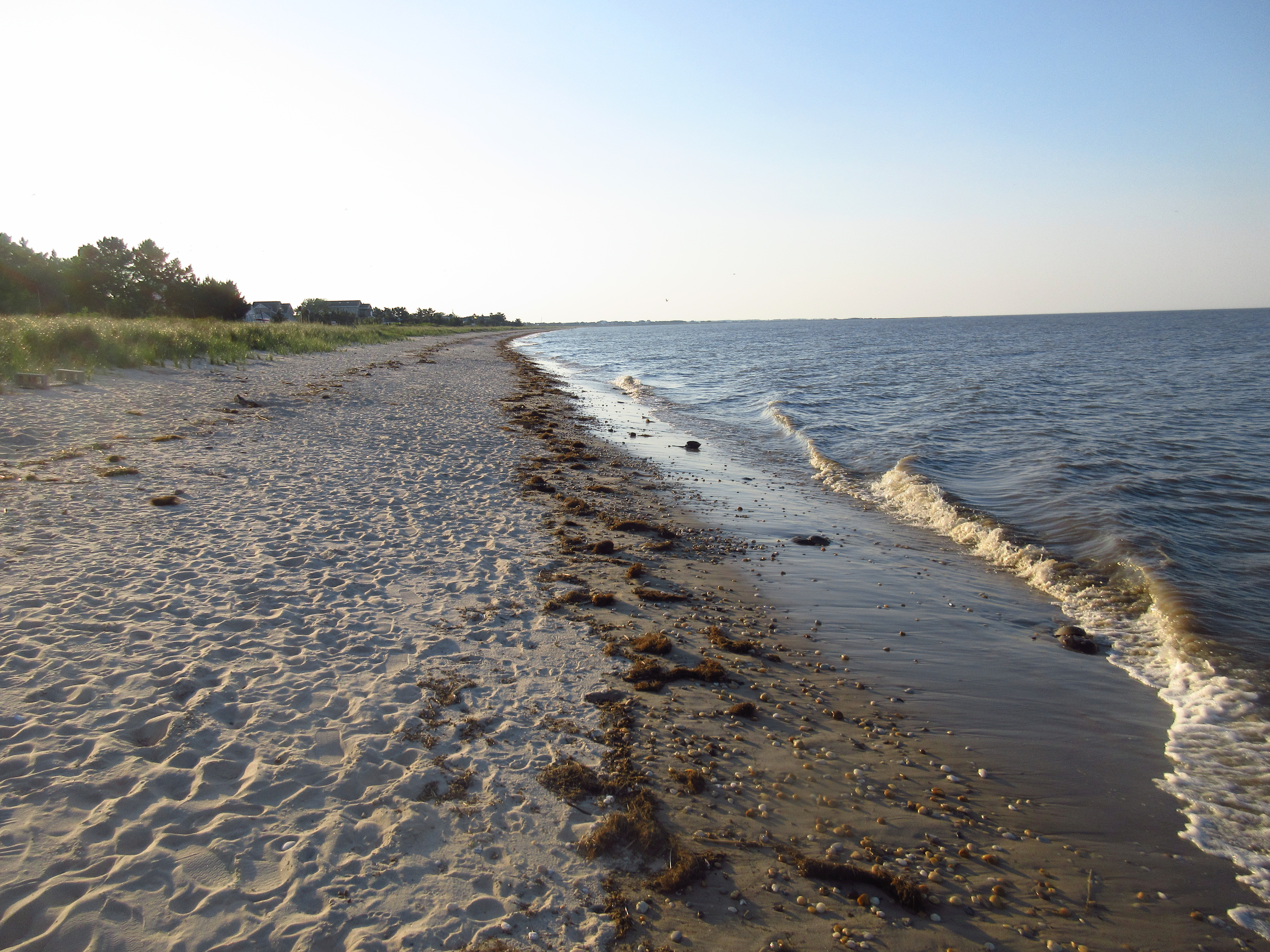
Horseshoe crabs mating in the surf. Slaughter Beach is an official sanctuary for this species.

Slaughter Beach is also home to the Milford Neck Wildlife Area. Tourists are attracted to this area for birding, as many birds stop over to eat the eggs of horseshoe crabs as they lay their eggs on the beaches. Along with Broadkill, Fowler, Kitts Hummock, Pickering, and Primehook beaches, this area is officially designated as a sanctuary for horseshoe crabs, the state marine animal of Delaware and a "signature species" of the Delaware Bay Estuary. Because Slaughter Beach is such an important area for the continued survival of horseshoe crabs and the migrating birds that depend on their eggs, the town has adopted the horseshoe crab as its official town symbol.

== Geography ==
Slaughter Beach is located at 38°54′46″N 75°18′15″W (38.9128903, –75.3040800).

According to the United States Census Bureau, the town has a total area of 1.3 square miles (3.4 km^{2}), all land.

== Transportation ==
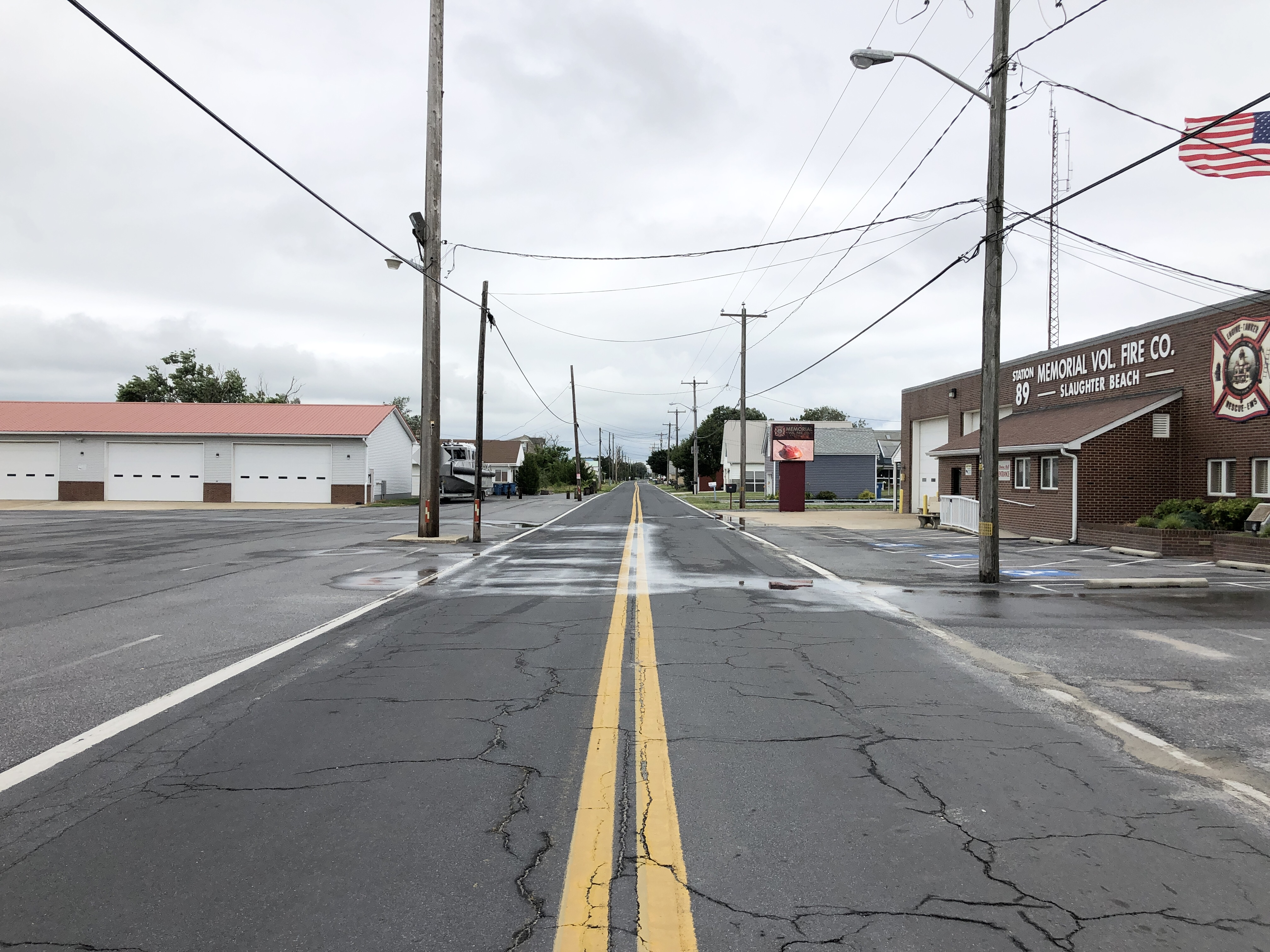
Bay Avenue through Slaughter Beach

The main method of transportation in and out of Slaughter Beach is by road. Bay Avenue is the main road through the town, traversing a northwest–southeast alignment parallel to the bay shore. Just northwest of the town, Bay Avenue connects with Delaware Route 36, which leads westward to Milford and Delaware Route 1.

== Demographics ==
Historical population
Census	Pop.	Note	%±
1940	46		—
1950	85		84.8%
1960	107		25.9%
1970	84		−21.5%
1980	121		44.0%
1990	114		−5.8%
2000	198		73.7%
2010	207		4.5%
2020	218		5.3%
U.S. Decennial Census

At the 2000 census there were 198 people in 108 households, including 64 families, in the town. The population density was 147.9 inhabitants per square mile (57.1/km^{2}). There were 253 housing units at an average density of 189.0 units per square mile (73.0 units/km^{2}). The racial makeup of the town was 99.49% White, and 0.51% from two or more races. Of the 108 households 3.7% had children under the age of 18 living with them, 55.6% were married couples living together, 3.7% had a female householder with no husband present, and 40.7% were non-families. 30.6% of households were one person and 13.9% were one person aged 65 or older. The average household size was 1.83 and the average family size was 2.23.

The age distribution was 4.0% under the age of 18, 1.5% from 18 to 24, 17.2% from 25 to 44, 50.0% from 45 to 64, and 27.3% 65 or older. The median age was 58 years. For every 100 females, there were 88.6 males. For every 100 females age 18 and over, there were 86.3 males.

The median household income was $41,250 and the median family income was $50,625. Males had a median income of $30,417 versus $37,188 for females. The per capita income for the town was $27,290. About 10.9% of families and 13.6% of the population were below the poverty line, including none of those under the age of eighteen or sixty five or over.

== Education ==
Slaughter Beach is in the Milford School District.

== In popular culture ==
Slaughter Beach, Dog is a folk rock band from Philadelphia, Pennsylvania named after the town.

Sunrise on Slaughter Beach is an album by American rock band Clutch.
