= Prime Hook National Wildlife Refuge =

Protected area in Delaware, United States

- IUCN category IV (habitat/species management area)
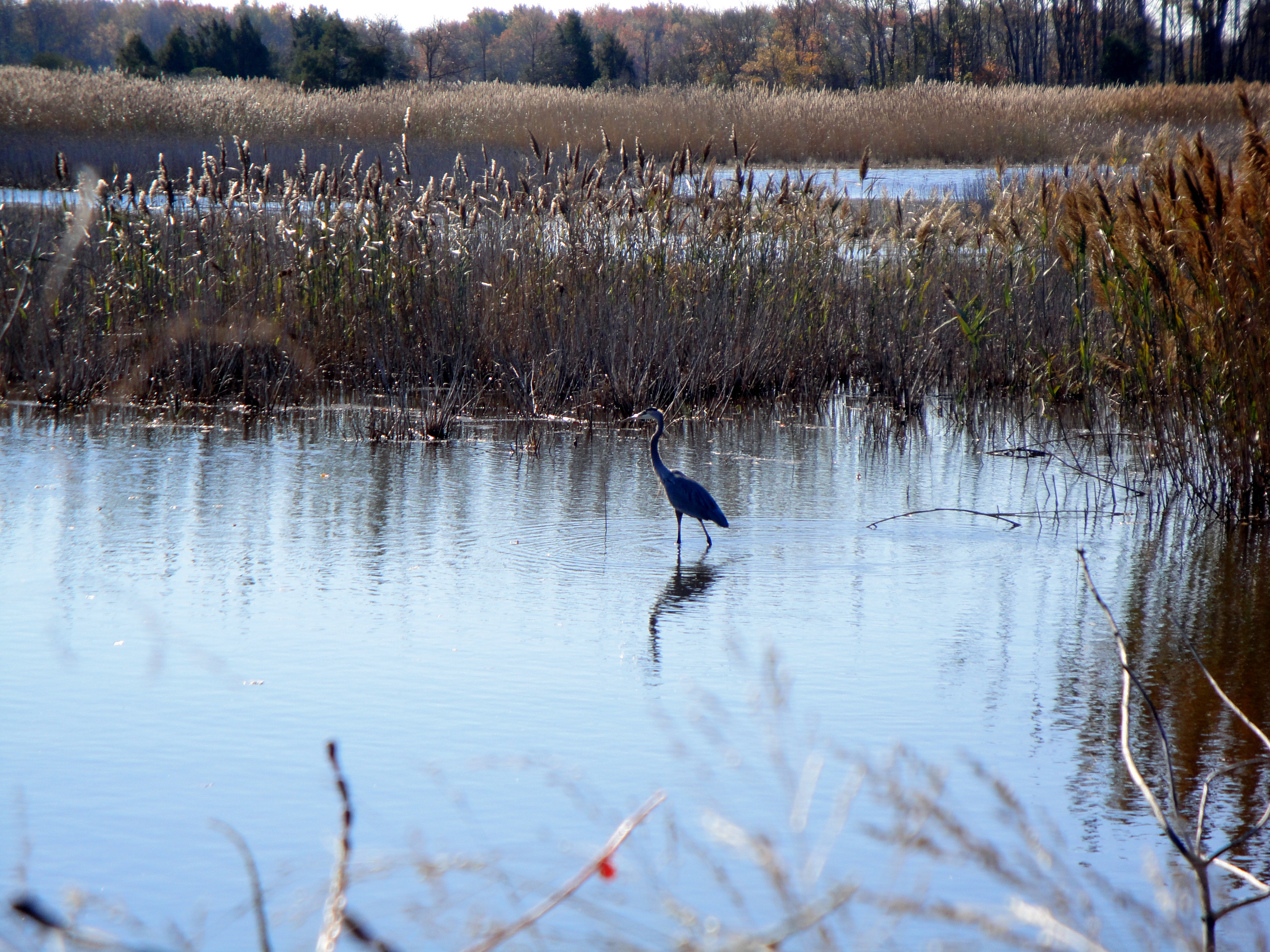
- Great blue heron at Prime Hook NWR

- Location within Delaware Location within the United States
- Location: Sussex County, Delaware, Delaware, United States
- Coordinates: 38°50′52″N 75°16′1″W
- Area: 15.6 sq mi (40 km^{2})
- Established: 1963
- Visitors: Open daily in season
- Website: Prime Hook National Wildlife Refuge

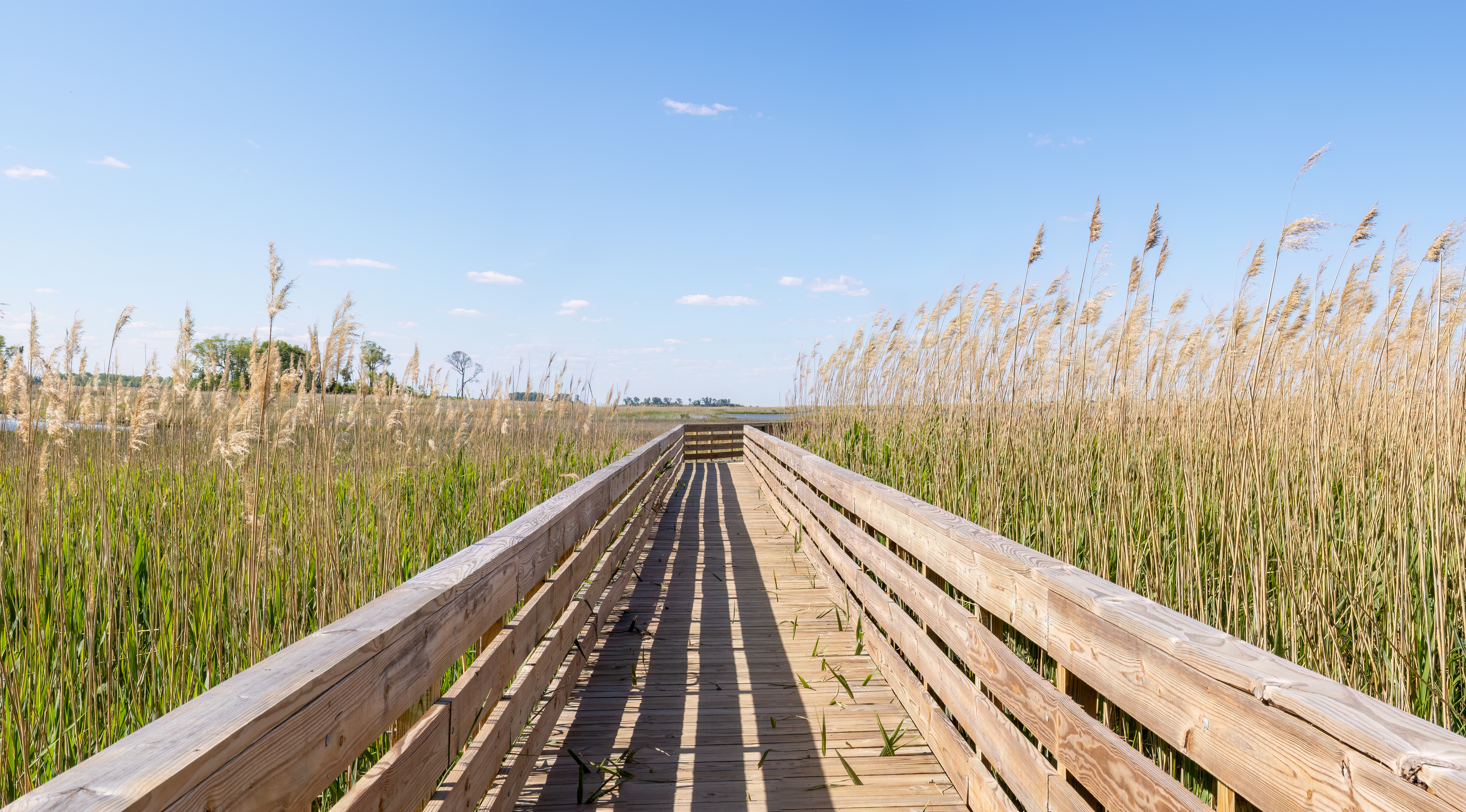
Boardwalk trail

Prime Hook National Wildlife Refuge is a sanctuary for migratory birds located east of Milton, Delaware, United States.

== Overview ==
The refuge was established in Sussex County, Delaware by President John F. Kennedy in 1963, pursuant to the Migratory Bird Conservation Act. Prime Hook comprises 10,000 acres (40 km^{2}) along the western shore of Delaware Bay. The refuge contains a variety of habitats, including freshwater and salt marshes, woodlands, grasslands, ponds, and forested areas, supporting 267 species of birds and a variety of reptiles, amphibians and mammals.

Fowler Beach, along the Eastern edge of the refuge, is an official sanctuary for horseshoe crabs, the state marine animal of Delaware and a "signature species" of the Delaware Bay Estuary.

The refuge is open to the public for wildlife-oriented recreation. Facilities include walking trails, a canoe trail, a bird blind and other wildlife observation areas, and a visitor center.

== Refuge damage and restoration ==
=== Land alterations ===
In the 1980s the US Fish and Wildlife Service (FWS) installed tide gates in the refuge, converting salt marshes into freshwater impoundments (ponds), in order to attract birds.

=== Flooding and hurricane damage ===
Flooding in 2006 and in subsequent years damaged the freshwater impoundments, leading to a loss of vegetation and wildlife habitat in the refuge. Nearby communities were flooded and experienced saltwater intrusion from Delaware Bay. In 2012 Hurricane Sandy caused additional damage.

=== Restoration ===
In 2016 the FWS, the US Army Corps of Engineers, the Delaware Department of Natural Resources and Environmental Control and several conservation organizations completed a large restoration project at Prime Hook, using funds provided by the Disaster Relief Appropriations Act, 2013. The project including dredging and replacing sediment to rebuild the salt marshes and improve hydrology, dredging tidal channels, and planting beachgrass and other types of vegetation.

== See also ==
- List of National Wildlife Refuges of the United States
