= Gum Branch (Nanticoke River tributary) =

Stream in Delaware, USA

Gum Branch Tributary to Nanticoke River
- Location of Gum Branch mouth Gum Branch (Nanticoke River tributary) (the United States)

Location
- Country: United States
- State: Delaware
- County: Sussex

Physical characteristics
- Source: divide between Gum Branch and Johnson Branch (Mispillion River)
  - location: about 3 miles northwest of Ellendale, Delaware
  - coordinates: 38°50′04″N 075°29′08″W
  - elevation: 55 ft (17 m)
- Mouth: Nanticoke River
  - location: about 1 mile northwest of Coverdale Crossroads, Delaware
  - coordinates: 38°43′48″N 075°33′40″W
  - elevation: 20 ft (6.1 m)
- Length: 9.72 mi (15.64 km)
- Basin size: 37.35 square miles (96.7 km^{2})
- Discharge
  - location: Nanticoke River
  - average: 37.35 cu ft/s (1.058 m^{3}/s) at mouth with Nanticoke River

Basin features
- Progression: Nanticoke River → Chesapeake Bay → Atlantic Ocean
- River system: Nanticoke River
- Tributaries
  - left: Parker Branch; Gully Camp Ditch
  - right: Stallion Head Branch; West Branch Gum Branch; Toms Dam Branch

Gum Branch is a 9.72 mi (15.64 km) long tributary to Nanticoke River in Sussex County, Delaware. It is one of the major tributaries to the Nanticoke River in Delaware along with Deep Creek, Gravelly Branch, and Broad Creek.

== See also ==
- List of Delaware rivers
