= Greenwood, Delaware =

- Town
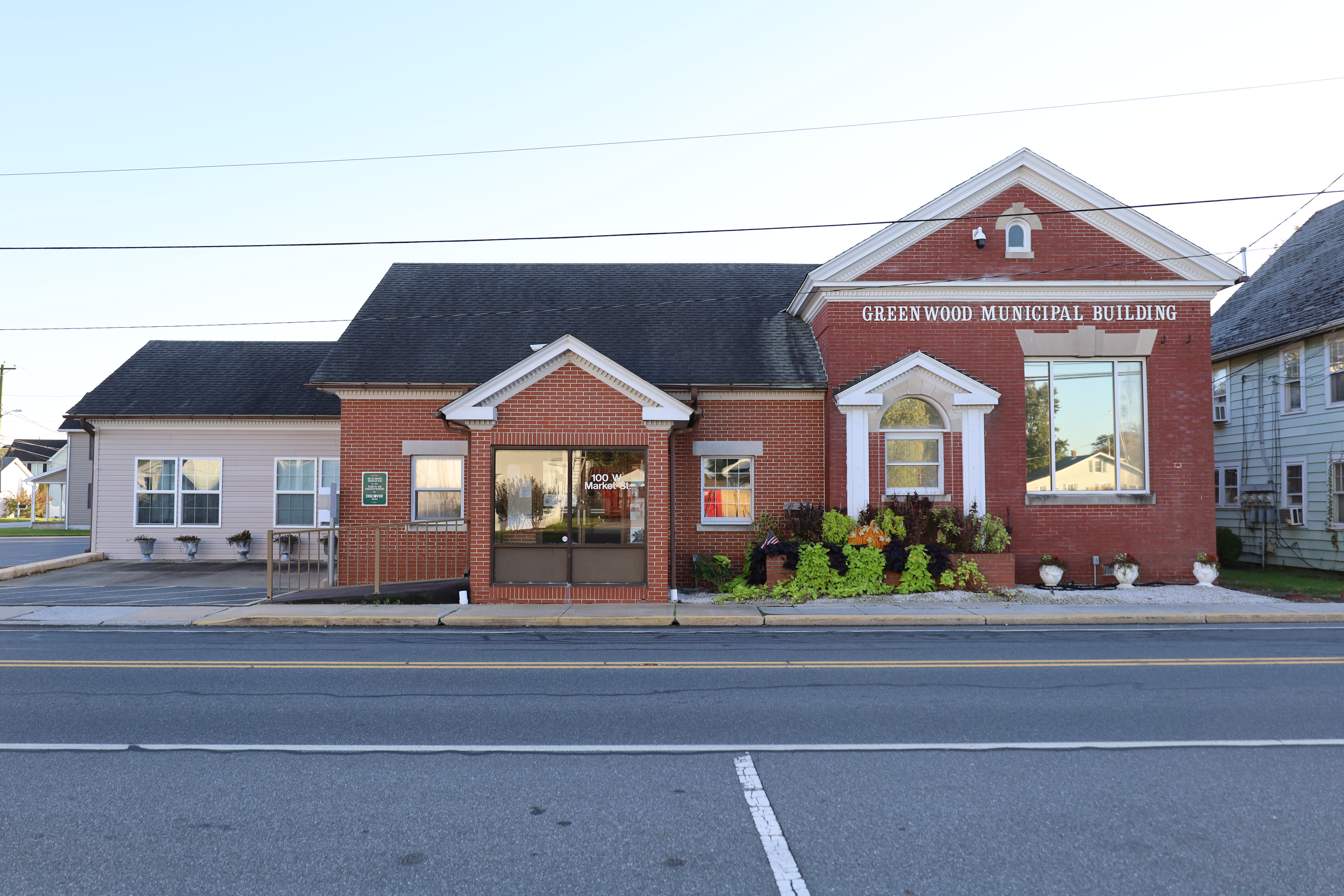
- Town Hall

- Seal

- Location of Greenwood in Sussex County, Delaware.

- Location within the state of Delaware Greenwood (the United States)
- Coordinates: 38°48′25″N 75°35′29″W
- Country: United States
- State: Delaware
- County: Sussex
- Founded: 1856
- Incorporated: March 9, 1901

Government
  - Mayor: Branden Cessna

Area
  - Total: 0.80 sq mi (2.06 km^{2})
  - Land: 0.80 sq mi (2.06 km^{2})
  - Water: 0 sq mi (0.00 km^{2})
- Elevation: 43 ft (13 m)

Population (2020)
  - Total: 990
  - Density: 1,247.0/sq mi (481.47/km^{2})
- Time zone: UTC−5 (Eastern (EST))
  - Summer (DST): UTC−4 (EDT)
- ZIP code: 19950
- Area code: 302
- FIPS code: 10-31560
- GNIS feature ID: 214035
- Website: greenwood.delaware.gov

Greenwood is a town in Sussex County, Delaware, United States. As of the 2020 census, Greenwood had a population of 990. It is part of the Salisbury, Maryland-Delaware Metropolitan Statistical Area.

== History ==
The Richards Historic District was listed on the National Register of Historic Places in 1983.

The official Delaware snow depth record was established near Greenwood on February 7, 2010, after the February 5–6, 2010 North American blizzard resulted in a measurement of 28 inches. The record was measured at the Greenwood 2.9 SE station of the Community Collaborative Rain, Hail and Snow Network.

== Geography ==
Greenwood is located at 38°48′25″N 75°35′29″W.

According to the United States Census Bureau, the town has a total area of 0.7 square miles (1.8 km^{2}) all land.

== Transportation ==
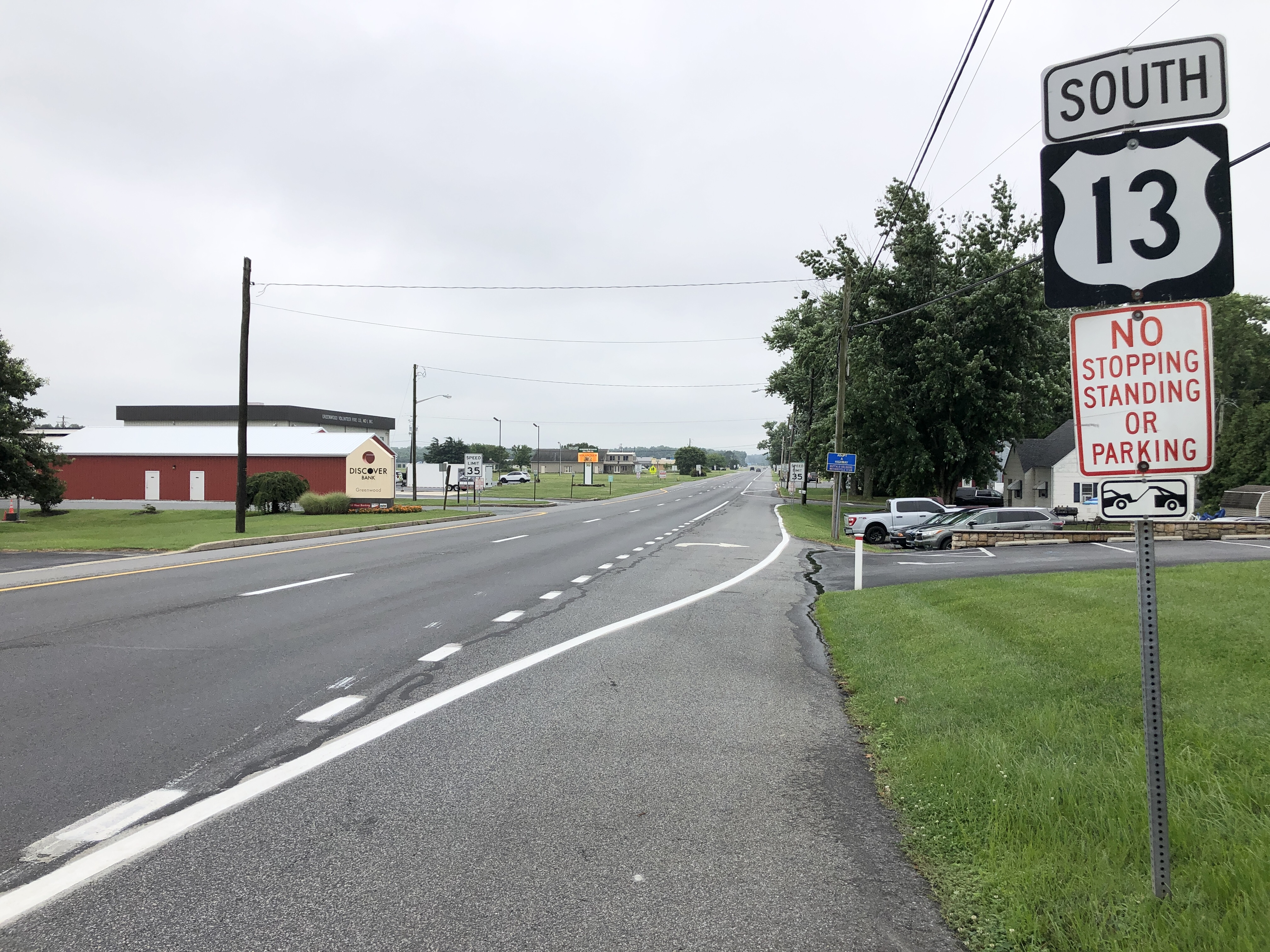
US 13 southbound in Greenwood

Road is the main method of transport to and from Greenwood. U.S. Route 13 (Sussex Highway) is the main highway serving the town, connecting to points north and south. Delaware Route 16 and Delaware Route 36 also pass through concurrently on an east–west alignment along Market Street. The Delmarva Central Railroad's Delmarva Subdivision line passes north–south through Greenwood.

== Demographics ==
Historical population
Census	Pop.	Note	%±
1880	109		—
1890	254		133.0%
1910	362		—
1920	500		38.1%
1930	527		5.4%
1940	573		8.7%
1950	746		30.2%
1960	768		2.9%
1970	654		−14.8%
1980	578		−11.6%
1990	578		0.0%
2000	837		44.8%
2010	973		16.2%
2020	990		1.7%
U.S. Decennial Census

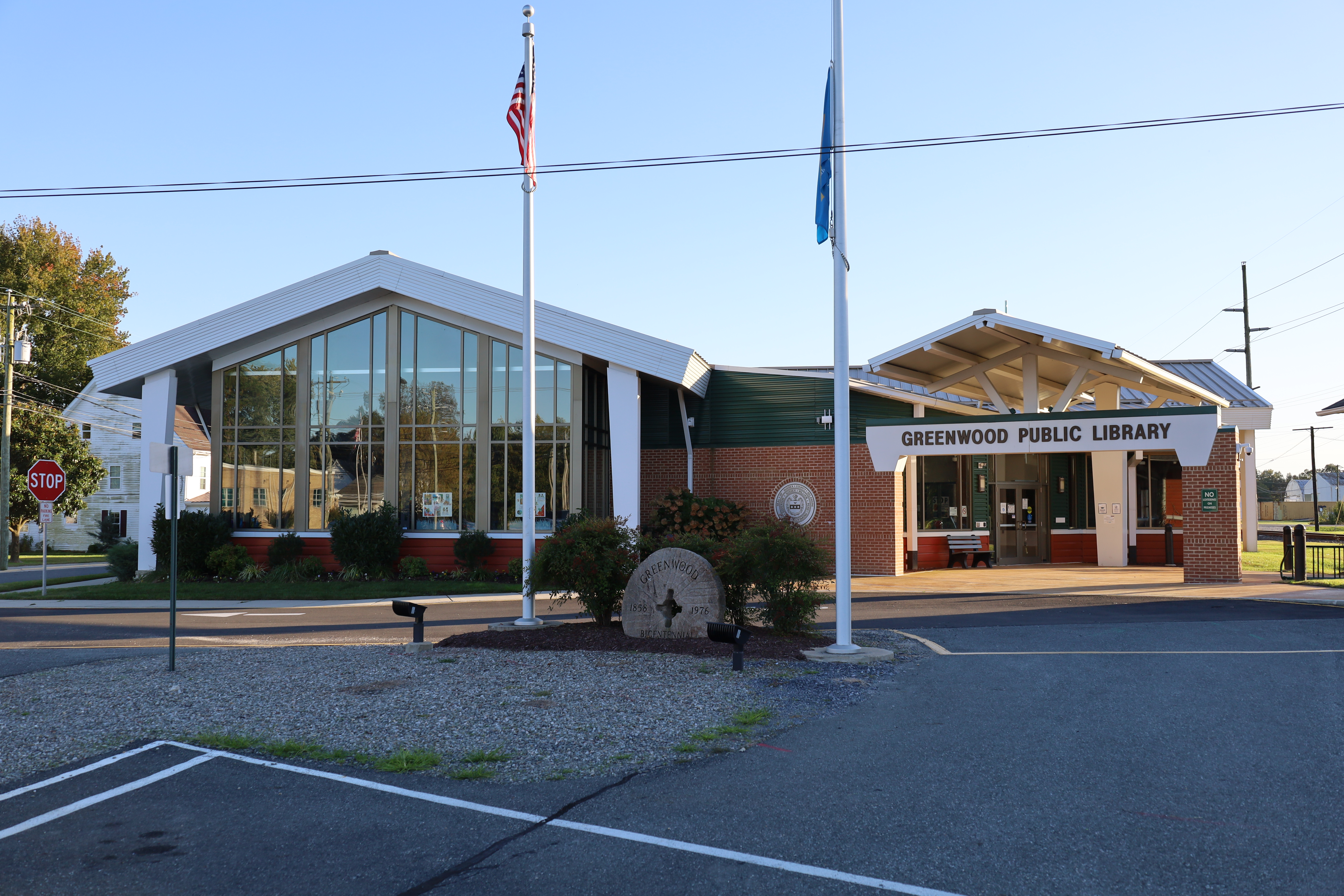
Public library

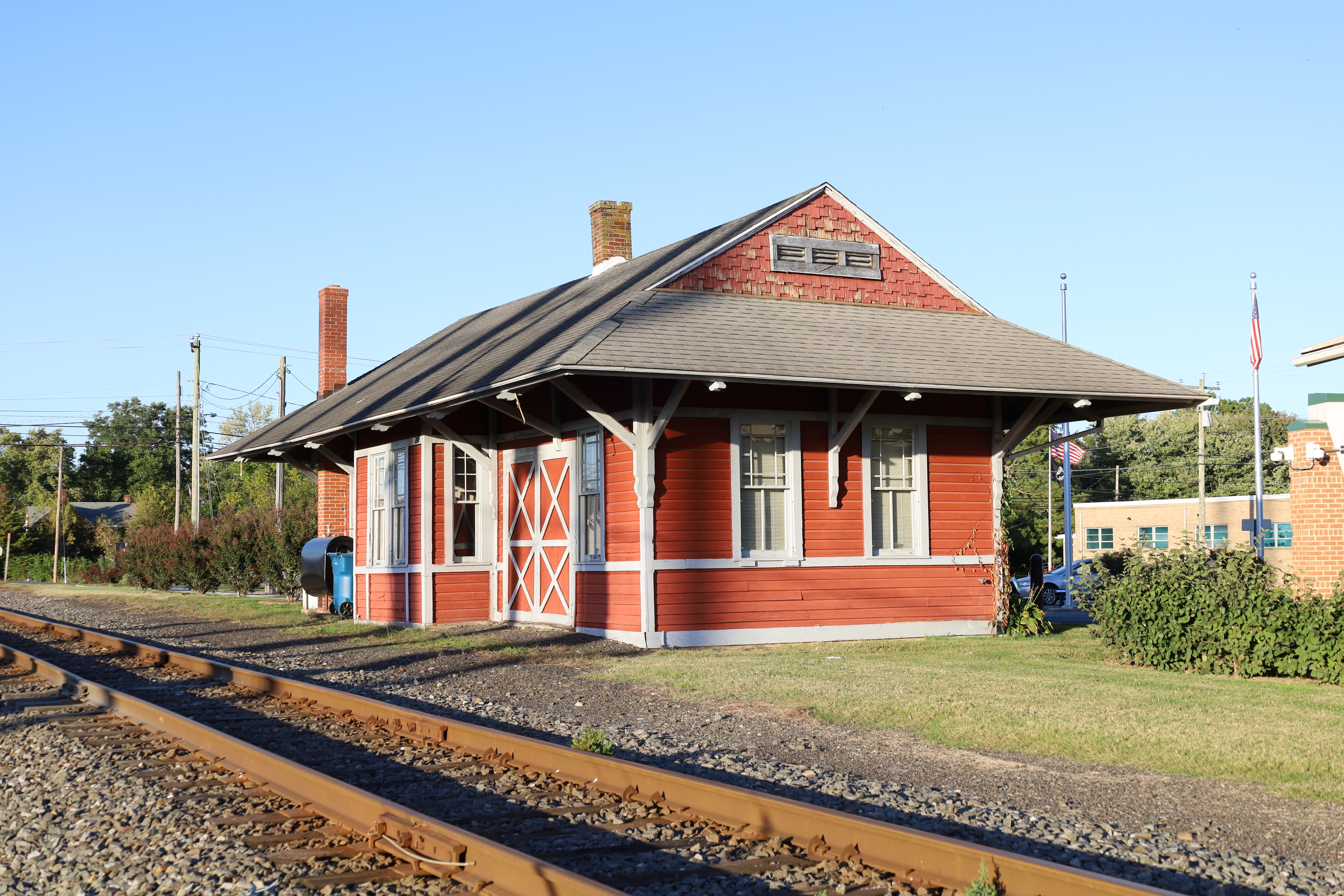
Former train station

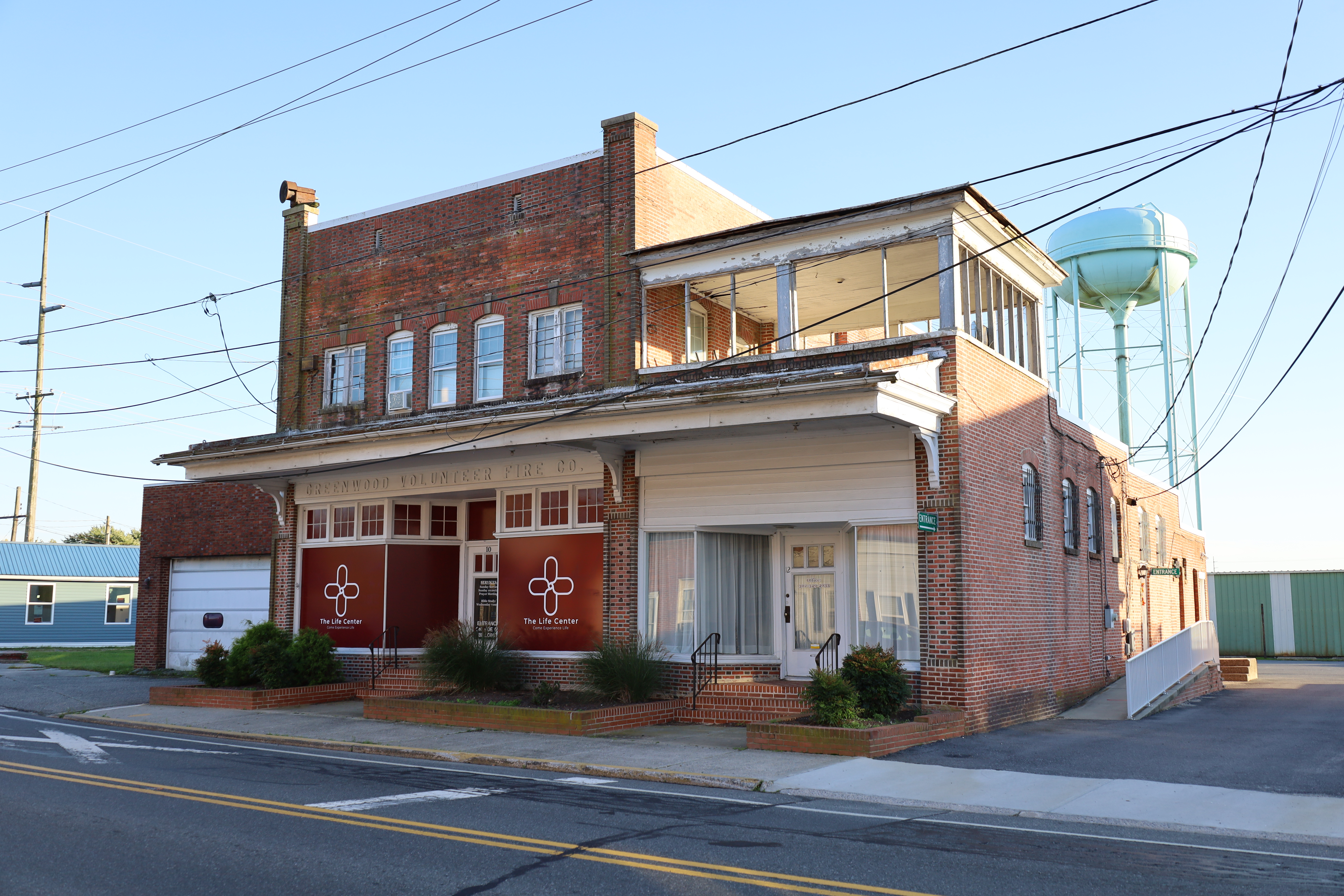
Former fire station

At the 2000 census there were 837 people, 335 households, and 211 families living in the town. The population density was 1,267.2 inhabitants per square mile (489.3/km^{2}). There were 394 housing units at an average density of 596.5 units per square mile (230.3 units/km^{2}). The racial makeup of the town was 74.91% White, 22.58% African American, 1.08% Asian, 0.12% Pacific Islander, 0.24% from other races, and 1.08% from two or more races. Hispanic or Latino of any race were 2.87%.

Of the 335 households 38.2% had children under the age of 18 living with them, 41.2% were married couples living together, 14.3% had a female householder with no husband present, and 37.0% were non-families. 31.9% of households were one person and 14.6% were one person aged 65 or older. The average household size was 2.50 and the average family size was 3.15.

The age distribution was 31.8% under the age of 18, 10.6% from 18 to 24, 29.3% from 25 to 44, 15.4% from 45 to 64, and 12.9% 65 or older. The median age was 30 years. For every 100 females, there were 94.7 males. For every 100 females age 18 and over, there were 89.1 males.

The median household income was $35,588 and the median family income was $40,000. Males had a median income of $30,066 versus $21,094 for females. The per capita income for the town was $13,918. About 8.3% of families and 11.5% of the population were below the poverty line, including 16.7% of those under age 18 and 7.6% of those age 65 or over.

== Education ==
Greenwood is in the Woodbridge School District. Its high school is Woodbridge High School.

== Notable people ==
- Simeon S. Pennewill, politician, Governor of Delaware (1909–1913)
- Earle D. Willey, politician, US Congressman (1943–1945)
- Hugh M. Morris, attorney, US District Court Judge (1878–1966)
- Mary Rawlinson Creason, honored aviator (1924–2021)
