= Delaware Route 24 =

State highway in Sussex County, Delaware, United States

Delaware Route 24

Route information
- Maintained by DelDOT
- Length: 42.8 mi (68.9 km)
- Existed: 1936–present
- Tourist routes: Nanticoke Heritage Byway

Major junctions
- West end: MD 348 east of Sharptown, MD
- US 13 in Laurel; US 113 / DE 20 in Millsboro; DE 30 in Millsboro; DE 5 in Oak Orchard; DE 5 / DE 23 in Long Neck; DE 1D / DE 24 Alt. in Midway
- East end: DE 1 in Midway

Location
- Country: United States
- State: Delaware
- Counties: Sussex

Highway system
- Delaware State Route System; List; Byways
← DE 23	→ DE 26

Delaware Route 24 (DE 24) is a state highway located in Sussex County, Delaware. The route runs from Maryland Route 348 (MD 348) at the Maryland border east of Sharptown, Maryland, east to an intersection with DE 1 in Midway, between Lewes and Rehoboth Beach. Along the way, DE 24 passes through Laurel, Millsboro, and Long Neck. DE 24 intersects U.S. Route 13 (US 13) in Laurel, runs concurrently with US 113/DE 20 and intersects DE 30 in Millsboro, and DE 5 and DE 23 in Long Neck. DE 24 features an alternate route, DE 24 Alternate (DE 24 Alt.), that runs to the north of the route from US 113 in Stockley to DE 24 near Midway. DE 24 was built as a state highway throughout the 1920s, with completion of the entire route by 1931. DE 24 was assigned onto its current alignment by 1936. DE 24 Alt. was designated by 2006. In 2025, DE 24 was realigned on the newly constructed North Millsboro Bypass.

== Route description ==
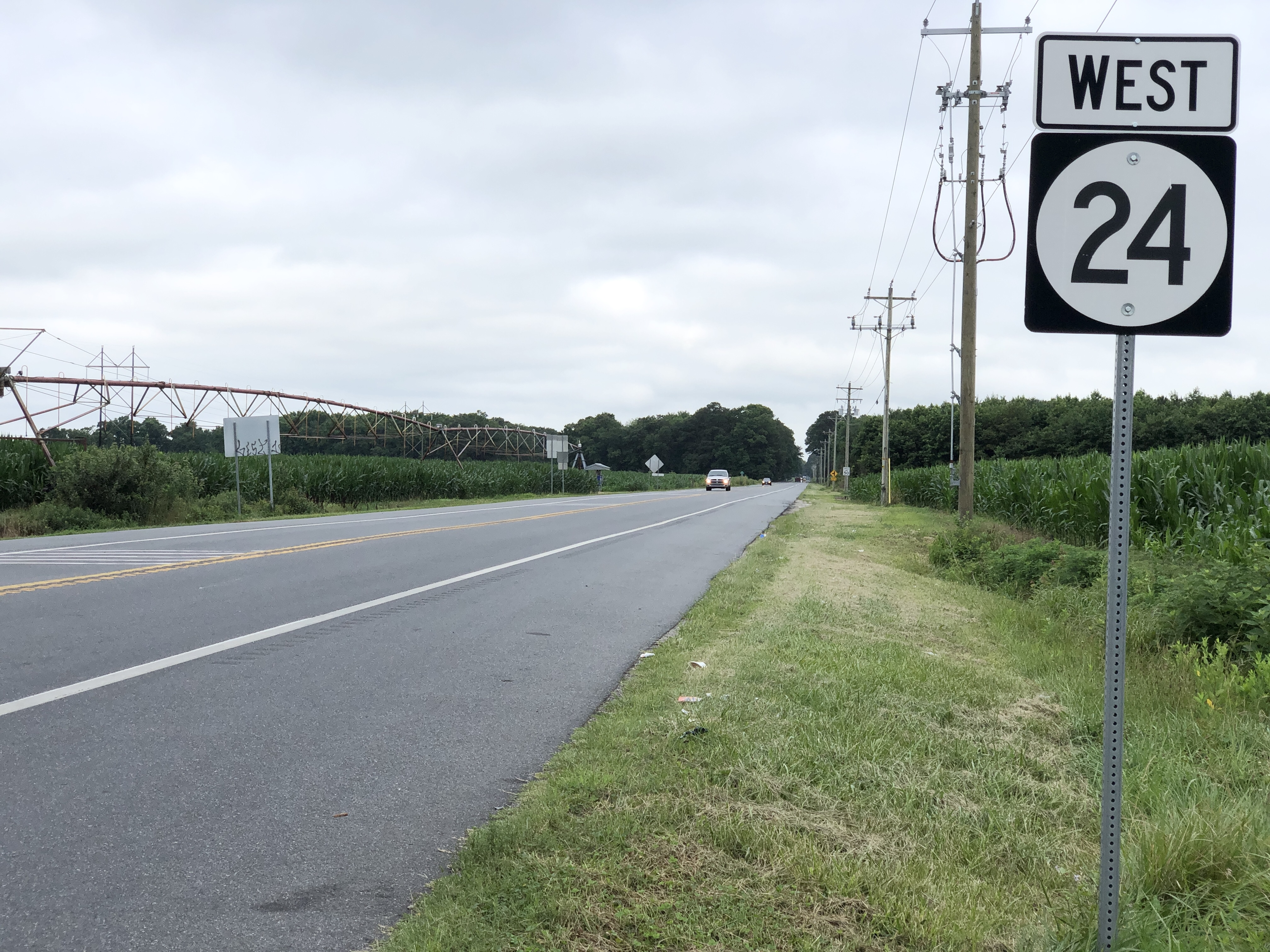
DE 24 westbound past DE 30 in Mission

DE 24 begins at the Maryland border, where the road continues west into that state as MD 348. From the state line the route heads east on two-lane undivided Sharptown Road. The road heads through agricultural areas with some woods and homes, crossing Cod Creek before curving to the northeast and crossing Tussocky Branch. DE 24 runs to the south of Laurel Airport and passes homes, crossing Little Creek to the north of Horseys Pond before it enters the town of Laurel. At this point, the route turns north onto West Street and runs through residential areas. DE 24 curves east and becomes West Market Street, crossing the Delmarva Central Railroad's Delmarva Subdivision line at-grade as it continues into the downtown area of Laurel. At the Central Avenue junction, the route becomes East Market Street and runs southeast, bending east onto East 4th Street and heading through areas of homes to the south of Records Pond. At the eastern edge of Laurel, DE 24 comes to an intersection with US 13.

Past Laurel, DE 24 heads east on Laurel Road through farmland with some woodland and homes, crossing James Branch. The route then passes to the north of Trap Pond State Park, with Trap Pond Road heading south to provide access to the state park. The road continues east through a mix of farms and woods with occasional residences, reaching an intersection with Millsboro Highway in Mission. Here, DE 24 turns north onto Millsboro Highway, with the road running northeast. Farther along, residential development increases as the road crosses into the town of Millsboro. At this point the road name becomes Laurel Road as it passes homes and reaches an intersection with US 113/DE 20. DE 24 turns north onto DuPont Boulevard and runs concurrently with US 113 and DE 20, while continuing north-northeast on Washington Street continues as DE 24 Business. DE 24 continues along DuPont Boulevard before exiting onto the North Millsboro Bypass, continuing east and crossing Millsboro Pond. A connector road allows access to DE 30. DE 24 Business then rejoins DE 24 at a light with Hollyville Road and John J. Williams Highway, and the route continues east as John J. Williams Highway.

DE 24 continues east from Millsboro, running through farmland with some woods and homes, passing through a Mountaire Farms chicken plant and briefly gaining a center left-turn lane. The route continues through rural areas as a two-lane road and crosses Swan Creek and Warwick Gut, bending to the northeast and passing northwest of the Nanticoke Indian Association's Nanticoke Indian Museum before coming to an intersection with DE 5 northwest of Oak Orchard. At this point DE 5 turns northeast to form a concurrency with DE 24. The road heads north through residential and commercial development with some fields as it enters the Long Neck area, where it intersects DE 23. Here, DE 5 splits from DE 24 by turning northwest onto DE 23, and DE 24 continues north through a mix of farms, woods, and residential neighborhoods, crossing Guinea Creek and passing the Baywood Greens golf course. The road runs through Angola and passes east of Burton Pond before it curves to the northeast, crossing Love Creek on the Eugene D. Bookhammer Bridge. The route continues northeast, widening to four lanes at the Mulberry Knoll Road intersection, and intersects DE 1D/DE 24 Alt. Here, DE 1D turns northeast to join DE 24 and the two routes pass homes and businesses as a five-lane road with a center left-turn lane. DE 24/DE 1D becomes a four-lane undivided road and then a divided highway as it comes to its end at an intersection with DE 1 in Midway, located between the cities of Lewes and Rehoboth Beach.

The section of DE 24 east of US 113 serves as part of a primary hurricane evacuation route from the Oak Orchard and Long Neck areas to points inland while the section of DE 24 between US 13 and Millsboro Highway serves as part of a secondary hurricane evacuation route from the coastal areas. The portions of the route between Townsend Street and Delaware Avenue in Laurel and Christ Church Road and Trap Pond Road east of Laurel are designated as part of the Nanticoke Heritage Byway, a Delaware Byway. DE 24 has an annual average daily traffic count ranging from a high of 34,023 vehicles at the DE 30 intersection to a low of 1,681 vehicles at the intersection with Dickerson Road west of Laurel.

== History ==
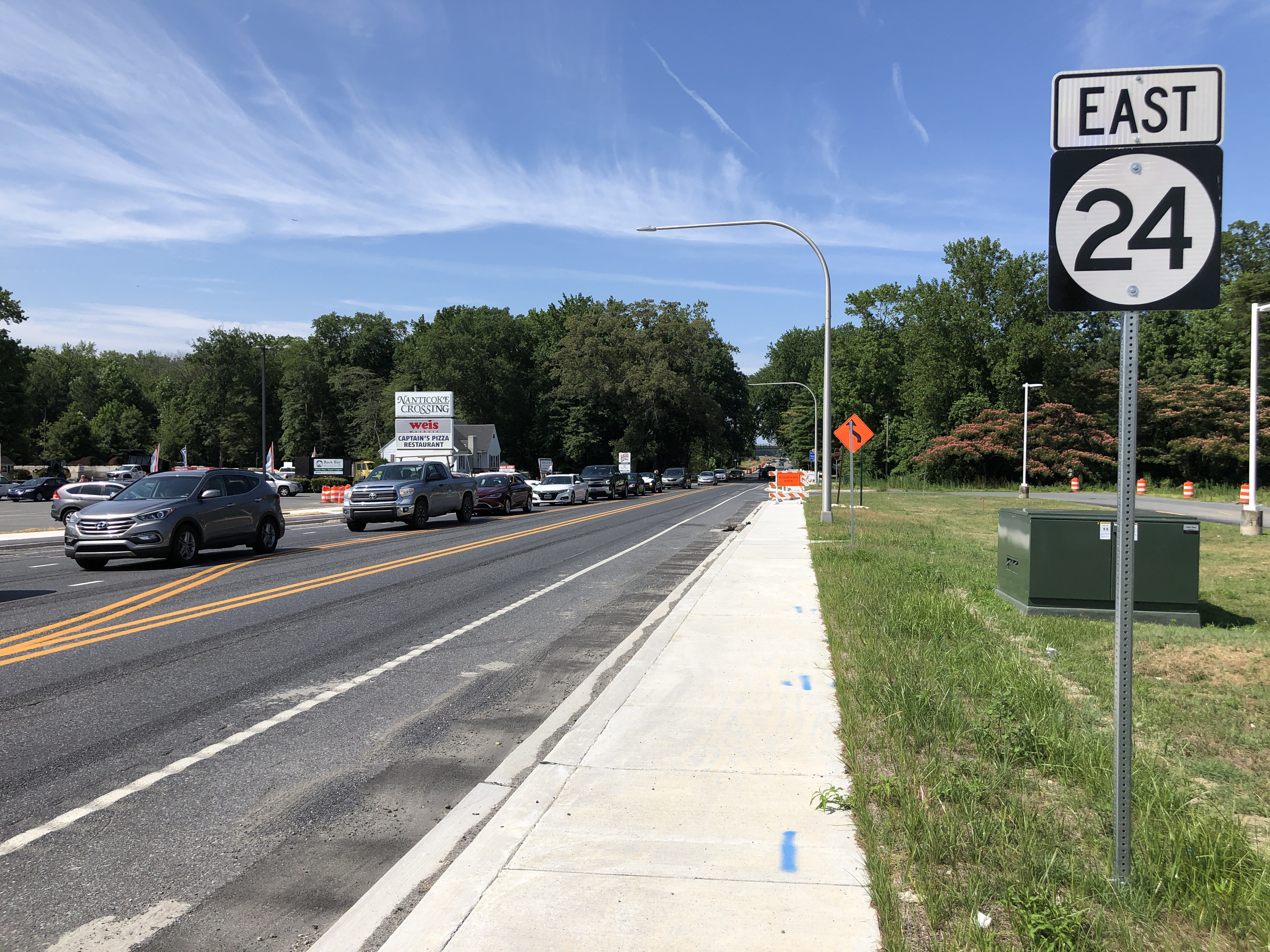
DE 24 eastbound past DE 5/DE 23 in Long Neck

By 1920, what is now DE 24 existed as a state highway between Mission and Phillips Hill, with the remainder of the route existing as an unimproved county road. At this time the road was under contract as a state highway between Laurel and Pepper and from Phillips Hill to east of Millsboro. The sections under contract were completed by 1924 and the remainder of present-day DE 24 was proposed as a state highway a year later. Completion of these final segments occurred by 1931. DE 24 was assigned to its current alignment between the Maryland border west of Laurel and DE 14 (now DE 1) in Midway by 1936. In 1940, a new bridge was built over Love Creek as part of improving the route east of Millsboro for traffic heading to the beaches in the summer.

On April 16, 2018, the Delaware Department of Transportation (DelDOT) unveiled plans to widen DE 24 to four lanes between the Love Creek bridge and DE 1 along with adding left turn lanes and improving intersections. This project is planned in order to improve safety and reduce traffic congestion along the road. Construction on the first phase between Mulberry Knoll Road and DE 1 began on March 3, 2020 and was completed in early 2022. Construction on the second phase between the Love Creek bridge and Mulberry Knoll Road began in March 2022; construction is scheduled to be finished in 2024.

A two-lane bypass of DE 24 was built to the north of Millsboro, running from the intersection of US 113 and DE 20, which was converted to an interchange, east across Millsboro Pond, DE 30, and Hollyville Road to an intersection with DE 24 east of Millsboro. The bypass is being built to reduce congestion on the section of DE 24 through Millsboro. A groundbreaking ceremony took place on March 31, 2023, with Governor John Carney, U.S. Senator Tom Carper, DelDOT secretary Nicole Majeski, and local officials in attendance. Construction of the Millsboro bypass was completed in September 2025.

== Major intersections ==
The entire route is in Sussex County.

Location	mi	km	Destinations	Notes
	0.00	0.00	MD 348 west (Laurel Road) – Sharptown	Maryland state line; western terminus
Laurel	8.85	14.24	US 13 (Sussex Highway) – Seaford, Delmar, Salisbury	
Millsboro	25.17	40.51	US 113 / DE 20 (Dupont Boulevard) – Dagsboro	South end of concurrency with US 113 and DE 20, west terminus of DE 24 Business
Millsboro	26.8	43.1	US 113 / DE 20 (Dupont Boulevard) / DE 24 Bus. – Georgetown, Seaford	North end of concurrency with US 113 and DE 20
Millsboro	28.4	45.7	DE 30 north (Gravel Hill Road)	Accessed via connector road
Millsboro	28.9	46.5	DE 24 Bus. north (John J. Williams Highway)	East terminus of DE 24 Business
Oak Orchard	33.5	53.9	DE 5 south (Oak Orchard Road) – Oak Orchard	West end of concurrency with DE 5
Long Neck	35.1	56.5	DE 5 north / DE 23 (Indian Mission Road/Long Neck Road) – Massey's Landing, Harbeson	East end of concurrency with DE 5
Midway	42.0	67.6	DE 1D north / DE 24 Alt. west (Plantation Road)	West end of DE 1D overlap; eastern terminus of DE 24 Alt.
Midway	42.8	68.9	DE 1 (Coastal Highway) – Lewes, Rehoboth Beach DE 1D ends	Eastern terminus; southern terminus of DE 1D
1.000 mi = 1.609 km; 1.000 km = 0.621 mi: Concurrency terminus

== Delaware Route 24 Business ==
Delaware Route 24 Business
- Location: Millsboro
- Length: 1.5 mi (2.4 km)
- Existed: 2025–present

Delaware Route 24 Business (DE 24 Bus.) is an alternate route of DE 24 that runs through downtown Millsboro. The route proceeds east from DE 24 and US 113 on Washington Street. The east and west routes split into a one-way pair that heads north, following Main Street eastbound and Washington Street westbound. The road crosses the Delmarva Central Railroad's Indian River Subdivision line at-grade. The one-way pair heads through the downtown area of Millsboro, rejoining along two-way Main Street and crossing Indian River to the east of Millsboro Pond. A short distance later, the route comes to an intersection with the southern terminus of DE 30.. The route then heads northeast on John J. Williams Highway, ending at an intersection with DE 24

=== Major intersections ===
The entire route is in Sussex County.

Location	mi	km	Destinations	Notes
0.8	1.3	US 113 (DuPont Highway) / DE 20 (Laurel Road) / DE 24	Western terminus	
0.8	1.3	DE 30 north (Gravel Hill Road)	Southern terminus of DE 30	
1.5	2.4	DE 24 (John J. Williams Highway)	Western terminus	
1.000 mi = 1.609 km; 1.000 km = 0.621 mi: Concurrency terminus

== Delaware Route 24 Alternate ==
Delaware Route 24 Alternate
- Location: Stockley–Midway
- Length: 17.8 mi (28.6 km)
- Existed: 2006–present

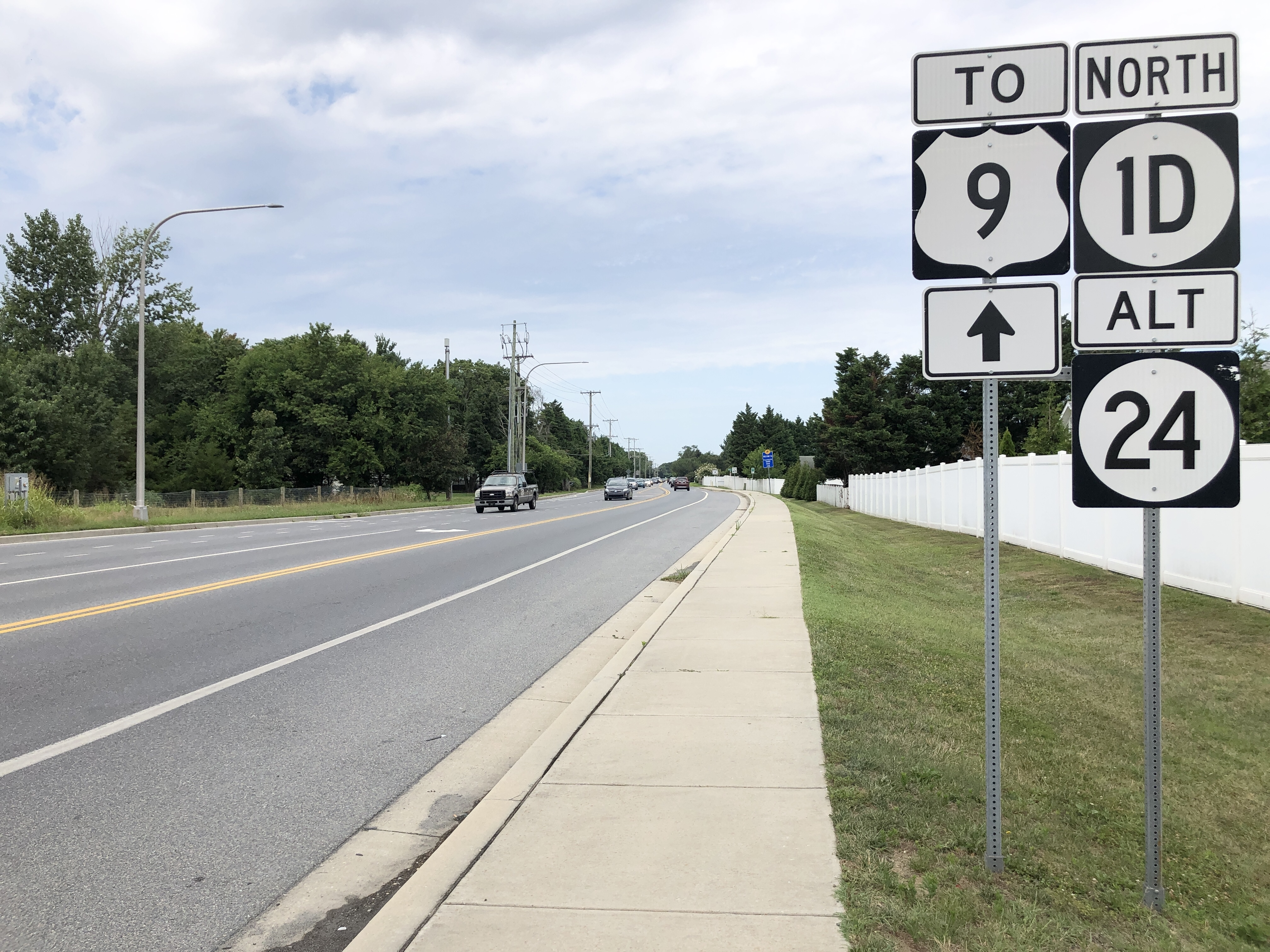
DE 24 Alt. westbound concurrent with DE 1D northbound near Midway

Delaware Route 24 Alternate (DE 24 Alt.) is an alternate route of DE 24 between US 113 in Stockley and DE 24 in Midway. The route heads east from US 113 on two-lane undivided Speedway Road, passing to the north of Georgetown Speedway. DE 24 Alt. reaches a roundabout with Zoar Road/Bethesda Road and heads southeast onto Zoar Road, passing through agricultural areas with some woods and homes and crossing the Delmarva Central Railroad's Indian River Subdivision line. The road continues east through more areas of farms, woods, and residences, turning north and east before crossing DE 30 in Zoar. The route heads east-northeast through more rural areas, turning north onto Hollyville Road. DE 24 Alt. turns northeast and comes to a junction with DE 5 in Hollyville. The road continues east as Hollymount Road and intersects DE 23 in Hollymount. Here, DE 24 Alt. turns north to join DE 23 on Beaver Dam Road and the two routes continue through agricultural and wooded areas with residential developments, curving to the northeast and crossing Bundicks Branch. In Five Points the road intersects DE 1D at a roundabout, with DE 23 turning to the north and DE 24 Alt. continuing northeast along with DE 1D on Plantation Road, which soon becomes a divided highway. The two routes curve southeast immediately to the south of the intersection between US 9/DE 404 and DE 1 and head through a mix of farmland and residential development as an undivided road. Finally, the road reaches an intersection with DE 24 where DE 24 Alt. ends and DE 1D turns northeast to join DE 24. DE 24 Alt. was designated by 2006.

=== Major intersections ===
The entire route is in Sussex County.

Location	mi	km	Destinations	Notes
Stockley	0.0	0.0	US 113 (Dupont Boulevard)	Western terminus
Zoar	4.5	7.2	DE 30 (Gravel Hill Road)	
Hollyville	8.7	14.0	DE 5 (Harbeson Road/Indian Mission Road)	
Hollymount	9.4	15.1	DE 23 south (Beaver Dam Road)	West end of DE 23 overlap
Nassau	15.2	24.5	DE 23 north (Beaver Dam Road) – Beaches DE 1D begins	Roundabout; east end of DE 23 overlap; west end of DE 1D overlap; northern terminus of DE 1D
Midway	17.8	28.6	DE 24 / DE 1D south (John J. Williams Highway)	Eastern terminus
1.000 mi = 1.609 km; 1.000 km = 0.621 mi: Concurrency terminus
