= Home Mission Society =

Home mission refers to a religious mission carried out within the country of the sponsoring organization.

Home Mission Society may refer to:

- American Home Mission Society, a historic Protestant Christian missionary society founded in 1826
- American Baptist Home Mission Society, a Christian missionary society established in 1832
- Catholic Home Missions, an organization to support poor dioceses in the United States
- Free Will Baptist Home Missions, the North American sending agency for the National Association of Free Will Baptists
- Glenmary Home Missioners, a Roman Catholic religious institute working in the rural United States
- Laymen's Home Missionary Movement, an American non-sectarian, interdenominational religious organisation
- Ramakrishna Mission Home of Service, an Indian branch of Ramakrishna Mission
- Women's Home Missionary Society, formed in 1893 in San Francisco, California

== See also ==
- List of Protestant missionary societies (1691–1900)
- Missionary (disambiguation)
- Mission (disambiguation)
