= Catholic charities =

Charitable organizations of the Catholic Church

The Catholic Church operates numerous charitable organizations.

Catholic spiritual teaching includes spreading the Gospel, while Catholic social teaching emphasises support for the sick, the poor and the afflicted through the corporal and spiritual works of mercy. The Catholic Church is the largest non-governmental provider of education and medical services in the world.

== History ==
The Catholic Church has had a long tradition of coordinating charity to the poor, something that was closely linked to the early Christian Eucharist, with the office of deacon being started for this purpose.

Over time this became a part of the bishop's responsibilities and then from the fourth century onwards was decentralised to parishes and monastic orders. After the Reformation, the Church lost a large amount of property in both Catholic and Protestant countries, and after a period of sharply increased poverty, poor relief had to become more tax based.

Within the United States, each diocese typically has a Catholic Charities organization that is run as a diocesan corporation, i.e., a civil corporation owned by the diocese or archdiocese.

== List of major Catholic charities (non-exhaustive) ==
- Aid to the Church in Need
- Ascension
- CAFOD
- Catholic Charities USA
- Catholic Home Missions
- Catholic Near East Welfare Association
- Catholic Relief Services
- Caritas Internationalis
- CIDSE
- Community of Sant'Egidio
- Cordaid
- Fidesco International
- Jesuit Refugee Service
- Malteser International
- Maryknoll
- Missionaries of the Poor
- Pontifical Mission Societies
- Renovabis
- Society of St Vincent de Paul
- Talitha Kum
- Trócaire

== See also ==
- Christian humanitarian aid
- Catholic Church and health care
- Catholic school
- Catholic higher education
- Ad gentes
- Catholic lay organisations
