= Mission =

Mission, Missions or The Mission may refer to:

== Geography ==
=== Australia ===
- Mission River (Queensland)

=== Canada ===
- Mission, British Columbia, a city
- Mission, Calgary, Alberta, a neighbourhood
- Okanagan Mission, a neighbourhood in Kelowna, British Columbia, commonly called "the Mission"
- Mission River, a short river located at the delta of the Kaministiquia River of northern Ontario, Canada
- Mission Ridge (British Columbia), a ridge in BC
- Mission Ridge Ski Area, a Ski Area near the ridge in BC
- Mission Lake, a lake in Saskatchewan

=== United States ===
- Mission, Delaware, an unincorporated community
- Mission, Kansas, a city
- Mission, Michigan, an unincorporated community
- Mission, Minnesota, an unincorporated community
- Mission, Oregon, an unincorporated community and census-designated place
- Mission, South Dakota, a city
- Mission, Texas, a city
- Mission District, San Francisco, a neighborhood in San Francisco, California, commonly called "the Mission"
- Mission Street, a street in San Francisco
- South Pasadena station, a light rail station, formerly called Mission station
- Mission River, a river in Texas

== Arts and entertainment ==
=== Film and television ===
- Mission (1961 film), a Soviet drama film by Yuri Yegorov
- The Mission (1983 film), an American drama film directed and produced by Parviz Sayyad
- The Mission (1986 film), a British drama film directed by Roland Joffé
- The Mission (1999 film), a.k.a. Cheung fo, a Hong Kong action film directed and produced by Johnnie To
- The Mission (2023 film), American documentary film about missionary John Allen Chau
- Mission (2023 film), an Indian Tamil-language action film by A. L. Vijay
- Mission (2026 film), a British film
- Missions (TV series), a 2017 French science-fiction drama series
- "The Mission", a 1985 episode of the television series Amazing Stories directed by Steven Spielberg

=== Music ===
- The Mission (band), a British gothic rock band formed in 1986
- The Mission (Captain Jack album), 1996
- The Mission (Royal Hunt album), 2001
- Mission (album), a 2016 album by Japanese singer/songwriter Mari Hamada
- The Mission (Styx album), 2017
- The Mission (soundtrack), the original score album of the 1986 film by Ennio Morricone
- "The Mission" (theme music), composed by John Williams
- "Mission" (song), a song from the 1987 album Hold Your Fire by Rush
- "The Mission", a song from the 1988 album Operation: Mindcrime by Queensryche
- "The Mission", a song from the 1995 album Revenge by Janis Ian
- "The Mission", a song from the 2002 album 30 Seconds to Mars by 30 Seconds to Mars
- "Mission", a song from the 2005 EP Van She by the Australian band Van She
- "The Mission", a song on Puscifer's 2009 album "C" Is for (Please Insert Sophomoric Genitalia Reference Here)
- "Mission", a song from the 2013 album Circle by Amorphis
- "Mission", a song from the 2019 album ERYS by American rapper Jaden

=== Other arts and entertainment ===
- The Mission (play), a 1980 German play (Der Auftrag) by Heiner Müller
- The Mission, a novel by Hans Habe based on the events surrounding the Evian Conference in 1938
- Missions (Shadowrun), a 1997 adventure for the role-playing game Shadowrun
- Mission, another term for quest, a task in a video game

== Religion ==
- Christian mission, an organized effort to spread Christianity
- Mission (LDS Church), an administrative area of The Church of Jesus Christ of Latter-day Saints
- The Mission (Vacaville, California), a nondenominational Christian church

== Other uses ==
- Diplomatic mission, a diplomatic outpost in a foreign territory
- Mission Foods, an American maker of tortillas and salsa
- Mission, a British hi-fi manufacturer owned by International Audio Group
- Mission (grape), a variety of grape
- Mission olive, a cultivar of olive developed in California
- Mission Party (Brazil), a political party
- Mission, a magazine published by University of Texas Health Science Center at San Antonio
- Mission statement, a declaration of organizational purpose
- Mission, a type of Military operation
- Mission, a type of Clandestine operation
- Mission, a type of Cover (intelligence gathering)

== See also ==
- Mission Hills (disambiguation)
- Mission Style (disambiguation)
- La Mission (disambiguation)
- Spanish Mission (disambiguation)
- Mission Revival architecture
