= La Misión =

La Misión may refer to:

- La Misión, Baja California, Mexico
- La Misión, Hidalgo, Mexico
- La Misión, Salta, Argentina

== See also ==
- Misión (disambiguation)
- La Mission (disambiguation)
