= Turkey Branch (Tussocky Branch tributary) =

Stream in Delaware, USA

Turkey Branch Tributary to Tussocky Branch
- Location of Turkey Branch mouth Turkey Branch (Tussocky Branch tributary) (the United States)

Location
- Country: United States
- State: Delaware
- County: Sussex

Physical characteristics
- Source: Collins and Culver Ditch divide
  - location: about 1 mile southeast of Portsville, Delaware
  - coordinates: 38°32′32″N 075°37′22″W
  - elevation: 30 ft (9.1 m)
- Mouth: Tussocky Branch
  - location: Portsville Pond
  - coordinates: 38°33′20″N 075°37′50″W
  - elevation: 7 ft (2.1 m)
- Length: 0.9 mi (1.4 km)
- Basin size: 0.41 square miles (1.1 km^{2})
- Discharge
  - location: Tussocky Branch
  - average: 0.48 cu ft/s (0.014 m^{3}/s) at mouth with Tussocky Branch

Basin features
- Progression: Tussocky Branch → Broad Creek → Nanticoke River → Chesapeake Bay → Atlantic Ocean
- River system: Nanticoke River
- Tributaries
  - left: unnamed tributaries
  - right: unnamed tributaries
- Bridges: Dogwood Lane

Turkey Branch is a 0.9 mi (1.4 km) long 1st order tributary to Tussocky Branch in Sussex County, Delaware.

== Course ==
Turkey Branch rises about 1 mile southeast of Portsville, Delaware and then flows northwest into Tussocky Branch at Portsville Pond.

== Watershed ==
Turkey Branch drains 0.41 square miles (1.1 km^{2}) of area, receives about 44.7 in/year of precipitation, has a topographic wetness index of 696.12 and is about 16% forested.

== See also ==
- List of Delaware rivers
