= Mission Style =

Mission Style may refer to:

- Mission School, an art movement of the late 20th century

== Architecture ==
- Mission Revival Style architecture
- Architecture of the California Missions
- Spanish Colonial Revival Style architecture
- The architecture of the Prairie School, including Frank Lloyd Wright's
- American Craftsman
- Craftsman Furniture

== Furniture ==
- Mission Style Furniture
- The furniture and architecture of Gustav Stickley
