= Portsville Lighthouse =

Historic house in Delaware, United States

- U.S. National Register of Historic Places
- Location within Delaware Location within the United States
- Location: N side of CR 493, Portsville, Delaware
- Coordinates: 38°33′44″N 75°37′45″W
- Area: 1.8 acres (0.73 ha)
- Built: 1932
- Architectural style: Architectural Folly
- NRHP reference No.: 87001514
- Added to NRHP: September 8, 1987

The Portsville Lighthouse was a historic house in Portsville, Sussex County, Delaware, situated along Broad Creek. The house was a folly, not a functional lighthouse, and was the oldest folly in Delaware. The house was built in 1932 by New York Supreme Court justice Edward R. Koch, who built the lighthouse on an existing home, store and shirt factory, the latter two moved from other parts of the village. Standing six stories tall, the lighthouse tower was one of the tallest buildings in inland Sussex County. The house was added to the National Register of Historic Places on September 8, 1987. The tower was torn down in the mid-1990s due to deterioration, and the house was destroyed by fire in February 2010 and dismantled the following July. The site is maintained by the state of Delaware as a fishing access area.
