= Misión =

Misión may refer to:

- Misión, Baja California Sur
- Misión, Sonora
- La Misión (Rancho La Misión), Coahuila
- La Misión, Coahuila
- La Misión, Hidalgo
- La Misión (Misión), Tamaulipas
- La Misión (Mision), Tamaulipas
- La Misión, Sinaloa

== See also ==
- La Misión (disambiguation)
