= 1996 Senior League World Series =

American youth baseball tournament

Tournament information
- Location: Kissimmee, Florida
- Dates: August 11–17, 1996

Final positions
- Champions: Maracaibo, Venezuela
- Runner-up: Thousand Oaks, California

The 1996 Senior League World Series took place from August 11–17 in Kissimmee, Florida, United States. Maracaibo, Venezuela defeated Thousand Oaks, California in the championship game. This would be the final year that 17-time champion Taiwan competed in Senior League Baseball.

== Teams ==
United States	International
(Florida) St. Cloud, Florida; District 3 Host	North Vancouver, British Columbia Canada
(Ohio) Maumee, Ohio Central	(Saudi Arabia) Dhahran, Saudi Arabia; Aramco; Europe
(Delaware) Midway, Delaware East	(Taiwan) Tainan, Taiwan Far East
(Alabama) Mobile, Alabama South	Maracaibo, Venezuela Latin America
(California) Thousand Oaks, California; District 13; West	

== Results ==
=== Winner's Bracket ===
Opening Game
—	Venezuela	13
—	Canada	2

—
1–0	Venezuela (F/10)	6
—	Florida	5
—	Alabama	7
—	Saudi Arabia	2
—	Ohio	2
—	Delaware	3
—	Taiwan	0
—	California	6

—
2–0	Venezuela	2
1–0	Alabama	1
1–0	Delaware	0
1–0	California	8

Bracket Final
3–0	Venezuela	3
2–0	California	0

=== Loser's Bracket ===
—
1
0–1	Taiwan	10
0–1	Ohio	5
7
3
0–1	Saudi Arabia	2
0–1	Canada	0
5

—
0–1	Florida	3
1–1	Taiwan	1
1–1	Delaware	2
1–1	Ohio	7

—
1–1	Alabama (F/10)	6
1–1	Florida	3
2–1	California	21
2–1	Ohio	6

Bracket Final
2–1	Alabama	3
3–1	California	11

=== Placement Bracket ===
—
1
0–2	Canada
2
7
3
6
0–2	Saudi Arabia
5

—
1–2	Delaware	11
1–2	Canada	2
1–2	Florida	0
1–2	Taiwan	6

—
2–2	Ohio	2
2–2	Delaware	7
2–2	Alabama	2
2–2	Taiwan	0

Third-place game
3–2	Delaware	4
3–2	Alabama	3

=== Elimination Round ===
Semifinals
3–0	Venezuela	3
2–0	California	0
2–1	Alabama	3
3–1	California	11

World championship
4–0	Venezuela	4
4–1	California	2
Third-place game
3–2	Delaware	4
3–2	Alabama	3

1996 Senior League World Series Champions
Maracaibo, Venezuela
