= Maryland Route 348 =

State highway in Maryland, United States

Maryland Route 348
- Maryland Route 348 highlighted in red

Route information
- Maintained by MDSHA
- Length: 1.39 mi (2.24 km)
- Existed: 1930–present

Major junctions
- West end: Main Street in Sharptown
- MD 313 in Sharptown
- East end: DE 24 near Sharptown

Location
- Country: United States
- State: Maryland
- Counties: Wicomico

Highway system
- Maryland highway system; Interstate; US; State; Scenic Byways
← MD 347	→ MD 349

Maryland Route 348 (MD 348) is a state highway in the U.S. state of Maryland. Known for most of its length as Laurel Road, the state highway runs 1.39 miles (2.24 km) from Main Street just west of MD 313 in Sharptown east to the Delaware state line, where the highway continues as Delaware Route 24 (DE 24). MD 348 was constructed in the early 1930s. The state highway originally had its western terminus at State Street in Sharptown. MD 348's terminus was rolled back to its present location following the completion of MD 313's bypass of Sharptown in the late 1980s.

== Route description ==
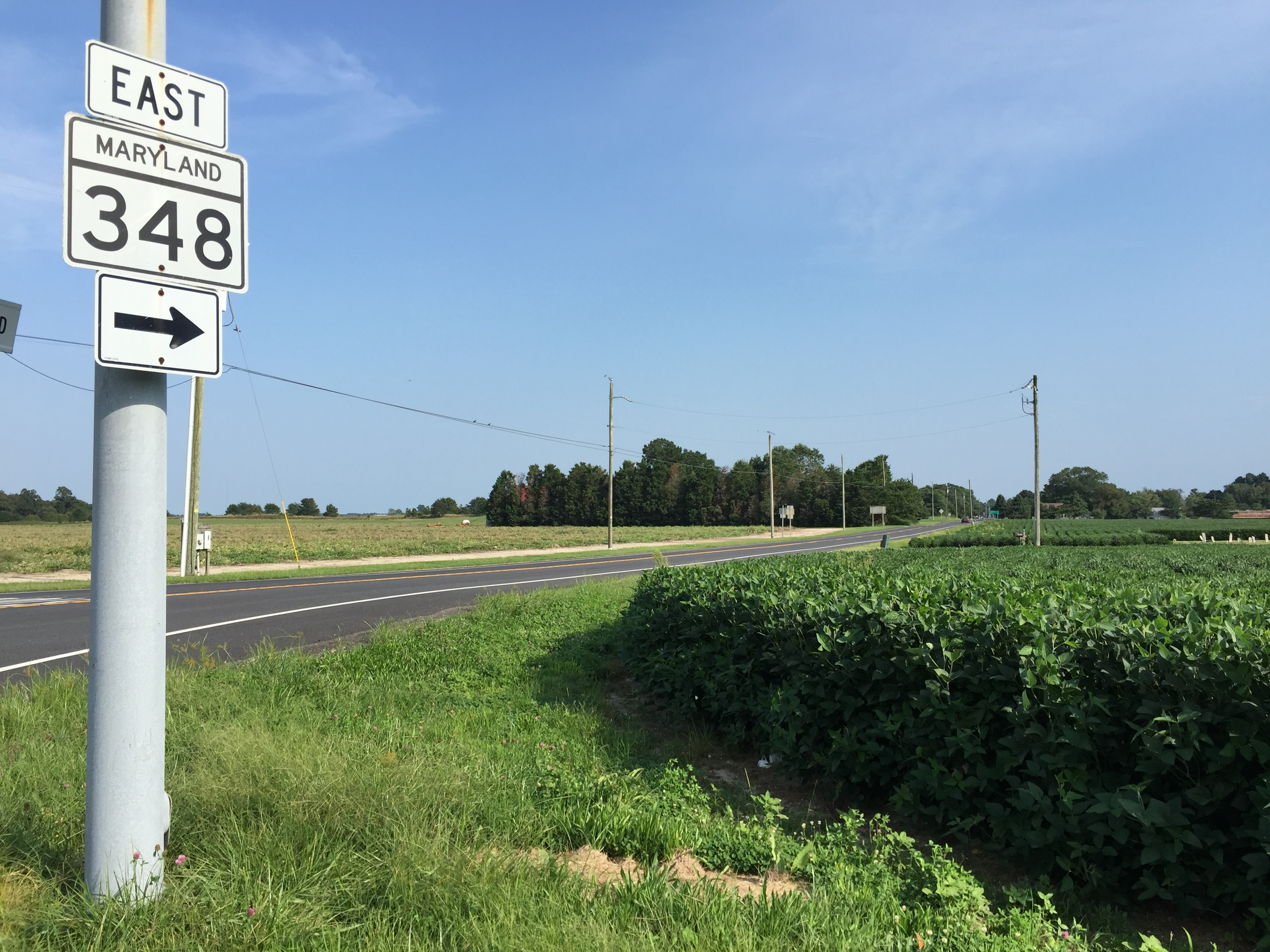
View east along MD 348 at MD 313 in Sharptown

MD 348 begins at the intersection of Main Street and Eagles Avenue on the edge of Sharptown. Main Street continues northwest as a street in the town of Sharptown. The state highway heads southeast on two-lane undivided Main Street, where it immediately encounters MD 313 (Sharptown Road). After crossing MD 313, MD 348 heads southeast as Laurel Road, running through farmland. After passing Santo Domingo Road, the route turns east and reaches its eastern terminus at the Delaware state line. The highway continues east as DE 24 (Sharptown Road) toward the town of Laurel.

== History ==
MD 348 was constructed as a modern highway beginning in 1930. The first segment of highway to be completed was from the Delaware state line to Santo Domingo Road. The remainder of the highway to State Street in Sharptown, which was once MD 313, was completed by 1933. The MD 313 bypass of Sharptown and the new bridge over the Nanticoke River were completed in 1987. The portion of MD 348 between State Street and Eagles Avenue was transferred to local maintenance by 1999.

== Junction list ==
The entire route is in Wicomico County.

Location	mi	km	Destinations	Notes
Sharptown	0.00	0.00	Main Street west	Western terminus
Sharptown	0.04	0.064	MD 313 (Sharptown Road) – Mardela Springs, Hurlock, Federalsburg	
	1.39	2.24	DE 24 east (Sharptown Road) – Laurel	Delaware state line; eastern terminus
1.000 mi = 1.609 km; 1.000 km = 0.621 mi
