= Wheeling Branch =

Stream in Delaware, USA

Wheeling Branch Tributary to Tussocky Branch
- Location of Wheeling Branch mouth Wheeling Branch (the United States)

Location
- Country: United States
- State: Delaware
- County: Sussex

Physical characteristics
- Source: Tussocky Branch divide
  - location: about 1 mile southeast of Ralphs, Delaware
  - coordinates: 38°29′04″N 075°37′14″W
  - elevation: 47 ft (14 m)
- Mouth: Tussocky Branch
  - location: about 0.5 miles east of Ralphs, Delaware
  - coordinates: 38°29′59″N 075°37′09″W
  - elevation: 45 ft (14 m)
- Length: 2.45 mi (3.94 km)
- Basin size: 1.32 square miles (3.4 km^{2})
- Discharge
  - location: Tussocky Branch
  - average: 1.55 cu ft/s (0.044 m^{3}/s) at mouth with Tussocky Branch

Basin features
- Progression: Tussocky Branch → Broad Creek → Nanticoke River → Chesapeake Bay → Atlantic Ocean
- River system: Nanticoke River
- Tributaries
  - left: unnamed tributaries
  - right: unnamed tributaries
- Bridges: Pine Branch Road

Wheeling Branch is a 2.45 mi (3.94 km) long 1st order tributary to Tussocky Branch in Sussex County, Delaware. This is the only stream of this name in the United States.

== Course ==
Wheeling Branch rises about 1 mile southeast of Ralphs, Delaware and then flows north-northwest into Tussocky Branch about 0.5 miles east of Ralphs, Delaware.

== Watershed ==
Wheeling Branch drains 1.32 square miles (3.4 km^{2}) of area, receives about 44.8 in/year of precipitation, has a topographic wetness index of 1,092.57 and is about 11% forested.

== See also ==
- List of Delaware rivers
