= Mill Branch (Tussocky Branch tributary) =

Stream in Delaware, USA

Mill Branch Tributary to Tussocky Branch
- Location of Mill Branch mouth Mill Branch (Tussocky Branch tributary) (the United States)

Location
- Country: United States
- State: Delaware
- County: Sussex

Physical characteristics
- Source: Tussocky Branch divide
  - location: Ralphs, Delaware
  - coordinates: 38°30′03″N 075°38′40″W
  - elevation: 48 ft (15 m)
- Mouth: Tussocky Branch
  - location: about 0.5 miles north of Ralphs, Delaware
  - coordinates: 38°31′14″N 075°38′00″W
  - elevation: 33 ft (10 m)
- Length: 1.70 mi (2.74 km)
- Basin size: 1.73 square miles (4.5 km^{2})
- Discharge
  - location: Tussocky Branch
  - average: 2.01 cu ft/s (0.057 m^{3}/s) at mouth with Tussocky Branch

Basin features
- Progression: Tussocky Branch → Broad Creek → Nanticoke River → Chesapeake Bay → Atlantic Ocean
- River system: Nanticoke River
- Tributaries
  - left: unnamed tributaries
  - right: unnamed tributaries
- Bridges: DE 24

Mill Branch is a 1.70 mi (2.74 km) long 1st order tributary to Tussocky Branch in Sussex County, Delaware.

== Course ==
Mill Branch rises in Ralphs, Delaware and then flows northerly into Tussocky Branch about 0.5 miles north of Ralphs, Delaware.

== Watershed ==
Mill Branch drains 1.73 square miles (4.5 km^{2}) of area, receives about 44.6 in/year of precipitation, has a topographic wetness index of 816.27 and is about 20% forested.

== See also ==
- List of Delaware rivers
