= American Board of Catholic Missions =

Defunct Catholic missionary society in the United States

The American Board of Catholic Missions was a Catholic missionary society organised by the United States Conference of Catholic Bishops.

Organized at Cincinnati, Ohio, 1920, by a committee appointed by the bishops of the Catholic Church to consolidate various missionary activities of the United States under the Catholic hierarchy in the United States and coordinate them with Catholic missions of other countries under general jurisdiction of an international board selected by the Vatican.

The Catholic Home Missions was an initiative of the board.

== See also ==
- Catholicism in the United States
