= Meadow Branch (Little Creek tributary) =

Stream in Delaware, USA

Meadow Branch Tributary to Little Creek
- Location of Meadow Branch mouth Meadow Branch (Little Creek tributary) (the United States)

Location
- Country: United States
- State: Delaware
- County: Sussex

Physical characteristics
- Source: Wood Creek and Jackson Branch divide
  - location: Delmar, Delaware
  - coordinates: 38°28′01″N 075°32′59″W
  - elevation: 50 ft (15 m)
- Mouth: Little Creek
  - location: about 2 miles south of Laurel, Delaware
  - coordinates: 38°31′16″N 075°34′42″W
  - elevation: 23 ft (7.0 m)
- Length: 5.83 mi (9.38 km)
- Basin size: 8.37 square miles (21.7 km^{2})
- Discharge
  - location: Little Creek
  - average: 9.84 cu ft/s (0.279 m^{3}/s) at mouth with Little Creek

Basin features
- Progression: Little Creek → Broad Creek → Nanticoke River → Chesapeake Bay → Atlantic Ocean
- River system: Nanticoke River
- Tributaries
  - left: unnamed tributaries
  - right: unnamed tributaries
- Bridges: US 13, Raceway Road, Bi State Boulevard, Old Crow Road, Bacons Road

Meadow Branch is a 5.83 mi (9.38 km) long 3rd order tributary to Little Creek in Sussex County, Delaware. Meadow Branch forms Little Creek along with Holly Branch.

== Variant names ==
According to the Geographic Names Information System, it has also been known historically as:

- Little Creek

== Course ==
Meadow Branch rises in Delmar, Delaware and then flows northwest and north into Little Creek about 2 miles south of Laurel.

== Watershed ==
Meadow Branch drains 8.37 square miles (21.7 km^{2}) of area, receives about 44.9 in/year of precipitation, has a topographic wetness index of 767.30 and is about 10% forested.

== See also ==
- List of Delaware rivers
