= Zoar, Delaware =

- Unincorporated community
- Location within the state of Delaware Zoar, Delaware (the United States)
- Coordinates: 38°38′49″N 75°17′50″W
- Country: United States
- State: Delaware
- County: Sussex
- Time zone: UTC-5 (Eastern (EST))
  - Summer (DST): UTC-4 (EDT)
- GNIS feature ID: 216261

Zoar is an unincorporated community located in Sussex County, Delaware, United States.

== Geography ==
Zoar is located in the central part of Sussex County, where Delaware Route 30 crosses Zoar Road. The community lies between Stockley and Hollyville. It is near Mount Joy.

== History ==
The Zoar Methodist Church was founded in the late 18th century. Originally a log building, around 1802, the original Zoar Church was replaced by a cypress-shingle structure. The church was incorporated in 1810. A fire destroyed the second church in 1910, and the present structure was built. A historical marker was placed by the Delaware Public Archives in 1994. This church still operates, and is now known as the Zoar United Methodist Church.

According to the State Archives, Zoar camp meetings began being held soon after the 1802 land purchase. These religious revival meetings were held in the grove adjoining the church. By 1893, the Zoar Camp was being called one of the oldest and most successful camps in Sussex County. The last meeting was held in 1918.

By the middle of the 20th century, Zoar had become a settlement, located 5.5 miles southeast of Georgetown. County Road 48 is now known as Zoar Road in honor of the community. This road forms part of the boundary of Delaware's 19th Senate district, bisecting the community.

In 2019, Delaware Electric Cooperative announced plans to build a second substation in Zoar. By 2020, plans had shifted, and the original Zoar substation would be replaced; according to representatives, the upgrades were necessary due to the rapid population growth in the area, and were projected to cost between $5 million and $6 million.
