= Ford and Johnson Chair Company =

Chair manufacturing company

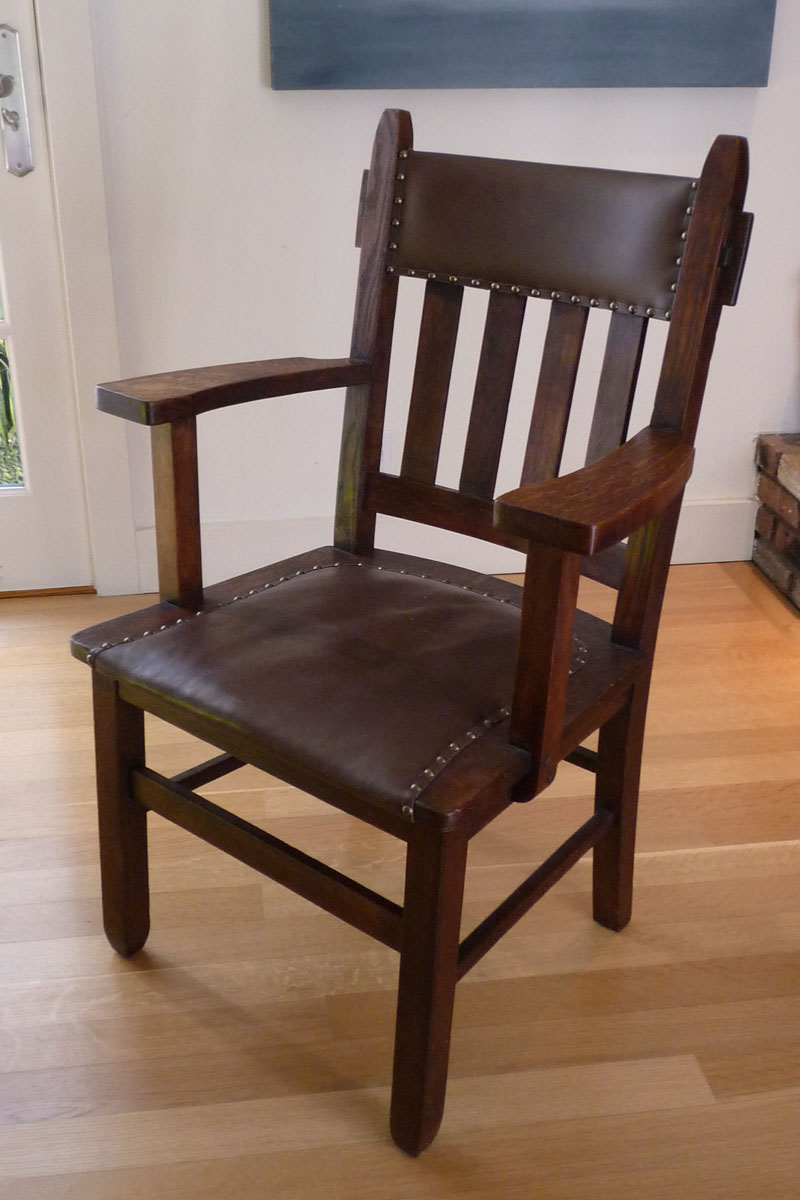
Rabbit Ear Arm Chair Designed and manufactured by J. S Ford, Johnson & Company – circa 1905

The Ford & Johnson Company was a chair manufacturing company founded by John Sherlock Ford and Henry W. Johnson in Columbus, Ohio in 1867. In 1868 the company relocated their factory to Michigan City, Indiana. In 1872 the company moved their headquarters to Chicago where they opened a showroom at 302 Wabash Avenue. They became known as J. S. Ford, Johnson & Company.

Ford & Johnson established themselves as a high quality manufacturer of Mission Style furniture that was sold across the United States. Ford Johnson was best known for their chairs and settees. They created their own unique designs as well as creating generic versions of admired designs of Gustav Stickley and others. The company offered 3,000 types of "chairs, rockers, and cradles" in the 1880s.

When Ford & Johnson entered bankruptcy in April 1912, it had nominal assets worth $1 million. In 1913, the Midland Chair & Seating Company purchased Ford & Johnson. S. Karpen & Brothers acquired Midland Chair in 1916. According to the historian Sharon Darling, the company was "one of the largest chair manufacturers in the country".
