= Delaware Route 30 =

State highway in Sussex County, Delaware, United States

Delaware Route 30
- DE 30 highlighted in red

Route information
- Maintained by DelDOT
- Length: 22.63 mi (36.42 km)
- Existed: 1938–present
- Tourist routes: Delaware Bayshore Byway

Major junctions
- South end: DE 24 in Millsboro
- US 9 / DE 404 in Gravel Hill; DE 16 near Milton; DE 1 in Milford
- North end: DE 1 Bus. in Milford

Location
- Country: United States
- State: Delaware
- Counties: Sussex

Highway system
- Delaware State Route System; List; Byways
← DE 28	→ DE 32

Delaware Route 30 (DE 30) is a state highway in Sussex County, Delaware. The route runs from an intersection with DE 24 in Millsboro north to DE 1 Business (DE 1 Bus.) in Milford near the area of Lincoln and Cedar Creek. Along the way, DE 30 intersects U.S. Route 9 (US 9)/DE 404 in Gravel Hill, DE 16 west of Milton, and DE 1 at an interchange in Milford.

What is now DE 30 south of Gravel Hill was built as a state highway in various stages during the 1920s and 1930s. A short-lived DE 30 in the 1930s ran from DE 20 in Seaford north and east to DE 404 northwest of Bridgeville. The current DE 30 was first designated by 1938 to connect DE 24 in Millsboro to DE 5 in Milton. The route was rerouted to end at DE 14 (now DE 1) south of Milford by 1971. DE 30 was extended southwest from Millsboro to Bi-State Boulevard between Laurel and Delmar in 1994, heading south concurrent with DE 24, DE 26, and DE 54 between Millsboro and Gumboro before turning to the west. The route's northern terminus was moved to DE 1 Bus. by way of a new road by 2003. An interchange with DE 1 was completed in 2014. DE 30 formerly had an alternate route, DE 30 Alternate (DE 30 Alt.), that was created by 1999 to connect the route with DE 1 by way of Johnson Road and was removed by 2017. In 2022, the southern terminus was cut back to its current location.

== Route description ==
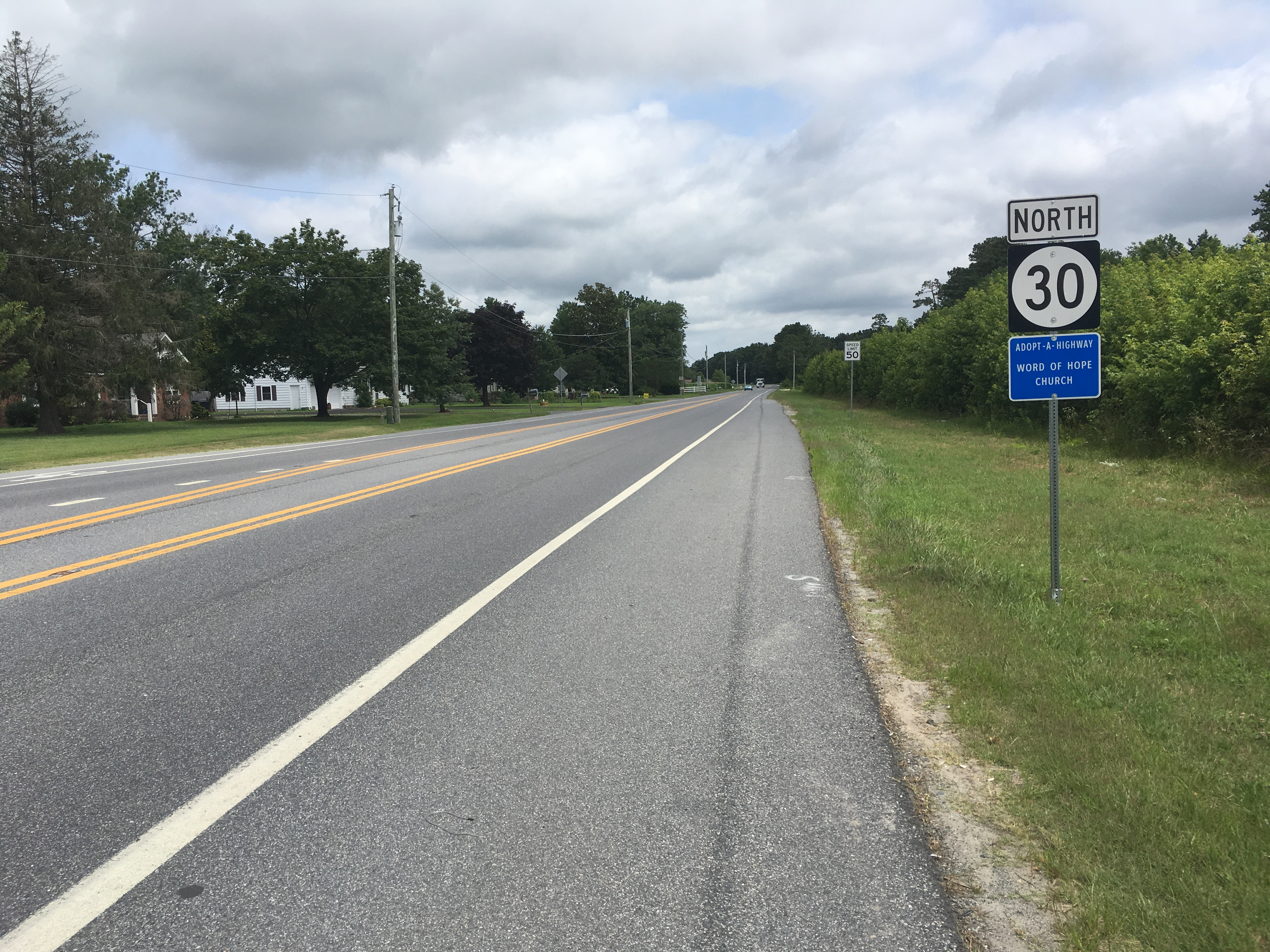
DE 30 northbound past US 9/DE 404 in Gravel Hill

DE 30 begins at an intersection with DE 24 on the northern edge of the town of Millsboro. From this intersection, the route heads north on two-lane undivided Gravel Hill Road, passing to the east of Millsboro Pond. The road runs through a mix of farmland and woodland with some homes, coming to a junction with Morris Mill Road/Mt. Joy Road. In the community of Zoar, the route intersects DE 24 Alt. Farther north, DE 30 has a junction with Springfield Road/Johnson Road before it reaches the community of Gravel Hill. In Gravel Hill, the road crosses the Delmarva Central Railroad's Lewes Industrial Track line at-grade and comes to an intersection with US 9/DE 404. From this point, the route curves northwest, reaching a junction with Shingle Point Road, before bending north again. DE 30 intersects DE 5 Alt., which serves as a western bypass of the town of Milton for DE 5. Here, DE 5 Alt. turns north to form a concurrency with DE 30, with the road crossing an abandoned railroad grade just east of the terminus of the Delmarva Central Railroad's Milton Industrial Track line. At an intersection with DE 16, DE 5 Alt. heads east along with that route and DE 30 continues north on Isaacs Road.

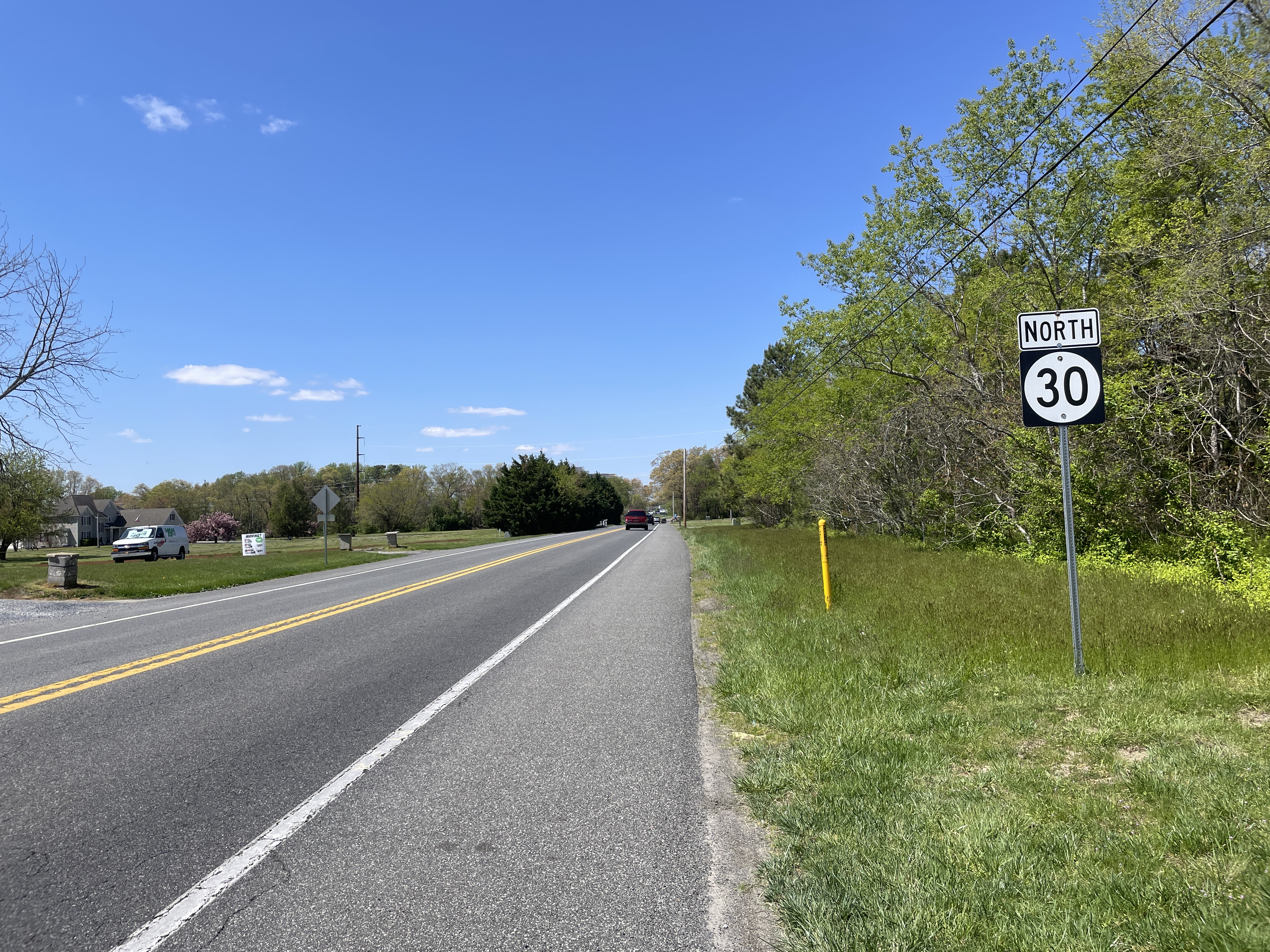
DE 30 northbound past Johnson Road south of Milford

The route heads away from Milton and crosses Sowbridge Branch as it passes to the east of Reynolds Pond. DE 30 intersects Cedar Creek Road and turns northwest onto that road, curving north. The route turns back to the northwest at the Jefferson Road/Sylvan Acres Road intersection at Jefferson Crossroads. The road heads through the Cedar Creek area and crosses Cedar Creek to the east of Swiggets Pond before it intersects Johnson Road. DE 30 continues north-northwest and runs along the eastern edge of the city of Milford, coming to ramps providing access to and from the southbound lanes of DE 1. At this point, the route gains a center left-turn lane and passes east of Bayhealth Hospital, Sussex Campus before it reaches an intersection with Wilkins Road, which provides access to and from the northbound lanes of DE 1 at an interchange. Past this intersection, DE 30 fully enters Milford and turns northwest, passing between residential subdivisions to the southwest and DE 1 to the northeast as a two-lane road and coming to its northern terminus at an intersection with DE 1 Bus. at the point that route merges into DE 1 at an interchange. DE 30 has access to northbound DE 1 Bus. and access from southbound DE 1 Bus.

The section of DE 30 between DE 24 and DE 1 serves as part of a primary hurricane evacuation route from areas along the inland bays in eastern Sussex County to points inland. The section of the route between DE 16 near Milton and DE 1 Bus. in Milford is designated as part of the Delaware Bayshore Byway, a Delaware Byway and National Scenic Byway. DE 30 has an annual average daily traffic count ranging from a high of 6,703 vehicles at the Fleatown Road intersection to a low of 3,455 vehicles at the Pettyjohn Road intersection.

== History ==
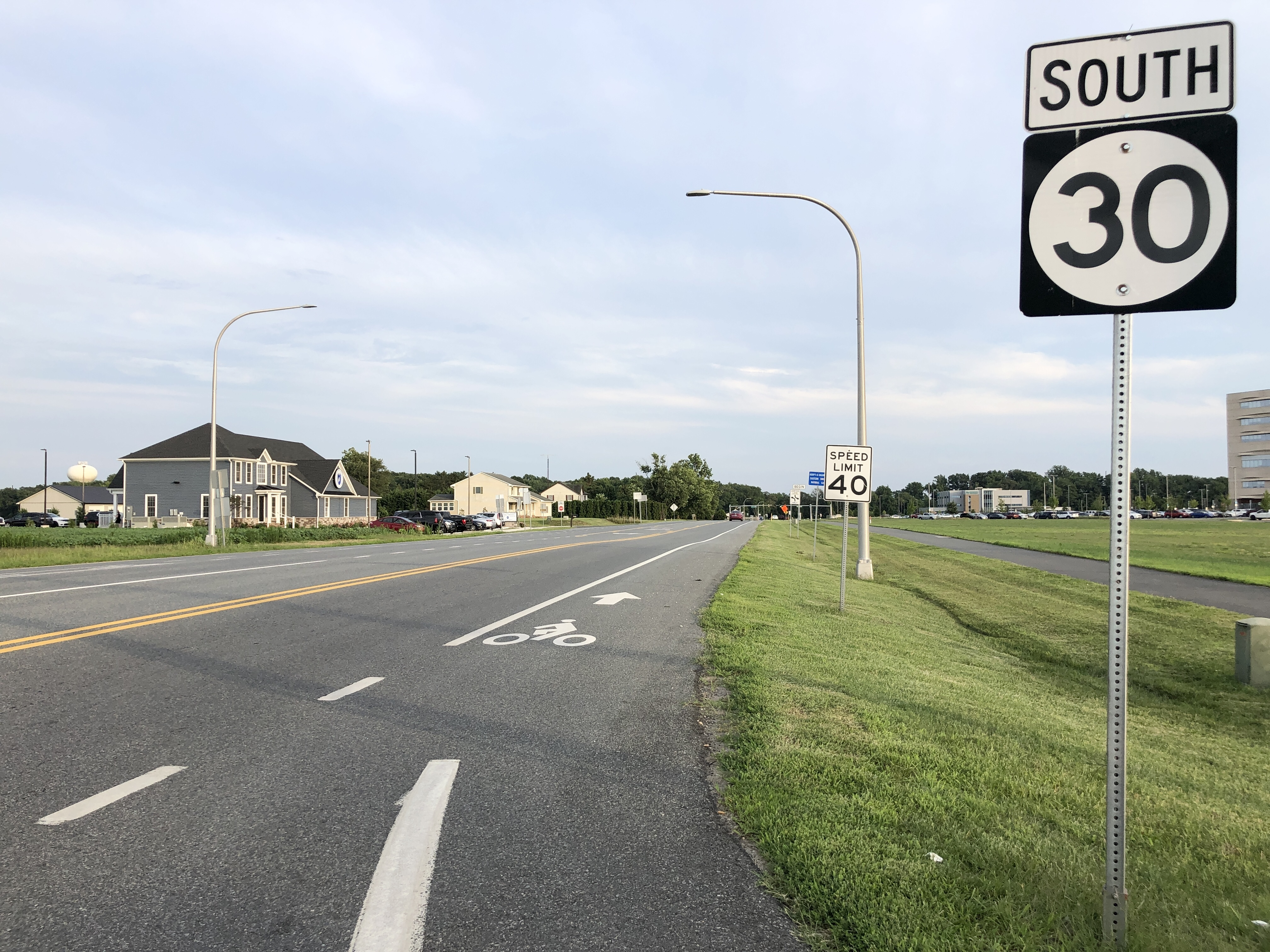
DE 30 southbound past Wilkins Road in Milford

By 1920, what would become DE 30 existed as a state highway between Mission and Phillips Hill and was proposed as one between Phillips Hill and Millsboro, with the remainder of the route existing as a county road. The state highway between Phillips Hill and Millsboro was completed by 1924. The state highway portion was extended from Mission to Gumboro a year later, with a section in the Gumboro area under proposal as a state highway. By 1931, the road was completed as a state highway between US 13 and Jones Branch and from James Branch to Gumboro. In addition, the state highway was completed from Millsboro to north of Gravel Hill as an unpaved road, with a portion north of Gravel Hill becoming a paved county road. The state highway between US 13 and Gumboro was fully complete the following year. By 1936, the road between Millsboro and Gravel Hill was paved.

DE 30 was first designated in 1936 to run from DE 20 in Seaford north and east to DE 404 northwest of Bridgeville, heading north and crossing DE 18 in Atlanta before turning east to reach DE 404. This was eliminated by 1938, and is now Atlanta Road and Dublin Hill Road. By 1938, DE 30 was designated to run from DE 24 in Millsboro north to DE 5 in Milton, following its current alignment to north of Gravel Hill and then running along Shingle Point Road north into Milton. A portion of current DE 30 south of the DE 16 intersection was paved a year later. By 1952, the current route of DE 30 north of Gravel Hill was paved. DE 30 was rerouted to follow its present alignment north to DE 14 (now DE 1) south of Milford by 1971.

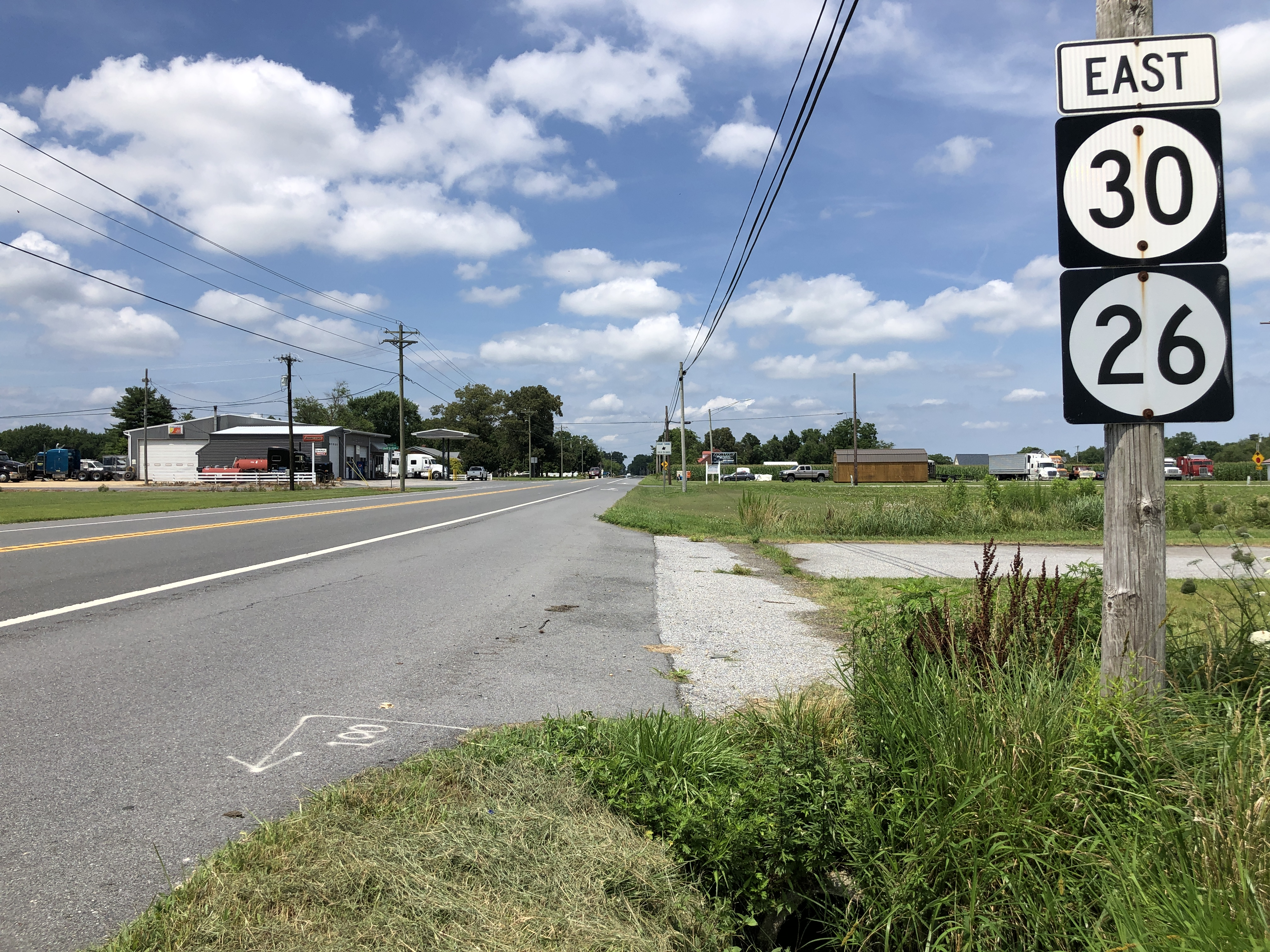
DE 30 eastbound along its former concurrency with DE 26 in Gumboro in 2022

By 1994, DE 30 was extended west from Millsboro to Bi-State Boulevard between Laurel and Delmar. The route ran concurrent with DE 24 through Millsboro along Main Street and Washington Street before following Millsboro Highway to Mission, where DE 24 split to the west. DE 30 continued south to Shaft Ox Corner, where it joined DE 26 in a concurrency. In Gumboro, DE 54 joined DE 26/DE 30 on Millsboro Highway before DE 30 split west along Whitesville Road. The route continued west and crossed US 13 before becoming Dorothy Road and ending at Bi-State Boulevard. The northern terminus of DE 30 was moved to its current location at DE 1 Bus. by 2003 when a road connecting DE 30 to DE 1 Bus. was completed. In November 2012, construction began on an interchange at DE 1 southeast of Milford. The interchange between DE 1 and DE 30 was completed in July 2014. On February 29, 2016, construction began on a superstreet intersection at US 13; this project was completed on May 19 of that year.

In 2021, the Delaware Department of Transportation (DelDOT) proposed eliminating the portion of DE 30 west of Millsboro. The elimination of this portion of the route was proposed to remove the concurrencies DE 30 had with other numbered routes along Millsboro Highway, reducing sign clutter and motorist confusion. In addition, the section of DE 30 west of Millsboro Highway had no shoulders, low traffic volumes, and ended at a minor intersection with Bi-State Boulevard; the removal of this section of DE 30 may redirect long-distance and truck traffic to use DE 24, DE 26, and DE 54 instead, which have higher traffic volumes and full-width shoulders. The decommissioning was completed in September 2022.

There are plans to construct a roundabout at the DE 16 intersection near Milton in order to reduce crashes at the intersection. Construction of the roundabout was planned for 2025.

== Major intersections ==
The entire route is in Sussex County.

Location	mi	km	Destinations	Notes
Millsboro	0.00	0.00	DE 24 (John J. Williams Highway)	Southern terminus
Zoar	3.60	5.79	DE 24 Alt. (Zoar Road)	
Gravel Hill	8.46	13.62	US 9 / DE 404 (Lewes Georgetown Highway) – Georgetown, Harbeson, Lewes, Rehoboth Beach	
Milton	12.80	20.60	DE 5 Alt. south (Sand Hill Road)	South end of DE 5 Alt. overlap
Milton	13.92	22.40	DE 16 / DE 5 Alt. north (Milton Ellendale Highway) – Ellendale, Milton	North end of DE 5 Alt. overlap
Milford	22.48	36.18	DE 1 (Coastal Highway) – Lewes, Dover	Interchange; access to and from northbound DE 1 via Wilkins Road
Milford	22.63	36.42	DE 1 Bus. north (South Rehoboth Boulevard)	Northern terminus; access to northbound DE 1 Bus. and from southbound DE 1 Bus.
1.000 mi = 1.609 km; 1.000 km = 0.621 mi: Concurrency terminus; Incomplete access

== Delaware Route 30 Alternate ==
Delaware Route 30 Alternate
- Location: Cedar Creek
- Length: 0.74 mi (1,190 m)
- Existed: 1999–2017

Delaware Route 30 Alternate (DE 30 Alt.) was a 0.74 mi (1.19 km) alternate route of DE 30 south of the city of Milford in the Cedar Creek area. It ran from DE 30 northeast to DE 1 along two-lane undivided Johnson Road, passing through a mix of farmland, woodland, and residential development. The route was created by 1999. DE 30 Alt. originally had full access to and from DE 1, but the median crossover was modified in 2011 to only allow access from DE 30 Alt. to southbound DE 1 while retaining access to DE 30 Alt. from both directions of DE 1. The DE 30 Alt. designation was removed from the road by 2017.
