= Missionary (disambiguation) =

A missionary is someone who travels to a region to work as part of a religious group.

Missionary may also refer to:

== People ==
- Mormon missionary, a missionary for The Church of Jesus Christ of Latter-day Saints
- The American "missionary generation", born between 1860 and 1882

== Film and television ==
- The Missionary, a 1982 comedy film starring Michael Palin
- Missionary (film), a 2013 horror-thriller film by Anthony DiBlasi
- The Missionary, a 2013 television film directed by Baltasar Kormákur
- The Missionaries, a 2014 French romantic comedy film

== Other ==
- The missionary position, a sex position
- The Missionary Position: Mother Teresa in Theory and Practice, a biography of Mother Teresa by Christopher Hitchens
- Misionarul (The Missionary), a Romanian-language newspaper
- "Missionary", a 1982 song by Spandau Ballet from their album Diamond
- Missionary (album), by Snoop Dogg and Dr. Dre, 2024

== See also ==
- Mission (disambiguation)
- Missionary Man (disambiguation)
- Hawaiian Missionaries (stamps)
