= Talitha Kum =

International network of Catholic nuns against human trafficking

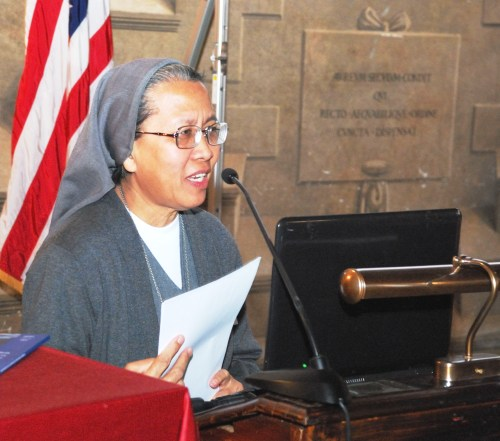
Sister Estrella Castalone, head of Talitha Kum in 2011.

Talitha Kum (or the International Network of Consecrated Life Against Trafficking in Persons) is an organization of Catholic nuns established by the International Union of Superiors General (UISG) in 2009. The group works to end human-trafficking and is based in Rome. The name comes from the expression found in the Gospel of Mark and is Aramaic, meaning, "Maiden, I say to you, arise." The organization is considered a Catholic charity, and operates as a network with many different groups. The former coordinator of Talitha Kum is Sister Estrella Castalone, and Sister Gabriella Bottani is the current head of the organization. John Studzinski chairs the group.

== History ==
The International Union of Superiors General (UISG) and the International Organization for Migration (IOM) started developing a program between 2004 and 2008, which created regional networks against trafficking in nine countries around the world. The idea to create a group which became Talitha Kum started in 2007 when Catholic women leaders discovered that rates of human trafficking were increasing. Talitha Kum was formally created in 2009 and brought the network of individual groups together. In 2013, Talitha Kum had counter-trafficking missions in 75 countries and involved over 600 nuns. By 2015, there were about 1,100 women working in 80 countries.

Sister Gabriella Bottani became the new coordinator of Talitha Kum in January 2015.

== Activity ==
Talitha Kum uses the Palermo Protocol of 2000 "for the protection, prevention and prosecution" of people being trafficked. Shelters, safe houses, counseling and legal assistance are available to victims through Talitha Kum. Members of Talitha Kum train local people to be aware of signs of human trafficking.

The sisters involved in Talitha Kum have been reported to disguise themselves as prostitutes in order to infiltrate brothels and rescue women. During the Brazilian World Cup in 2014, the group organized a campaign called "Play for Life, Report Trafficking," which was meant to raise awareness of human trafficking and how to report possible incidents.

Other services include training women in vocational skills and providing "assistance for micro-industries." One of its member groups is the Alliance to End Human Trafficking.
