= Missionary Man =

Missionary Man may refer to:

- "Missionary Man" (song), a 1986 song by Eurythmics
- Missionary Man (comics), a comic series written by Gordon Rennie
- Missionary Man (film), a 2007 film by Dolph Lundgren

== See also ==
- Missionary (disambiguation)
