= San Domingo School =

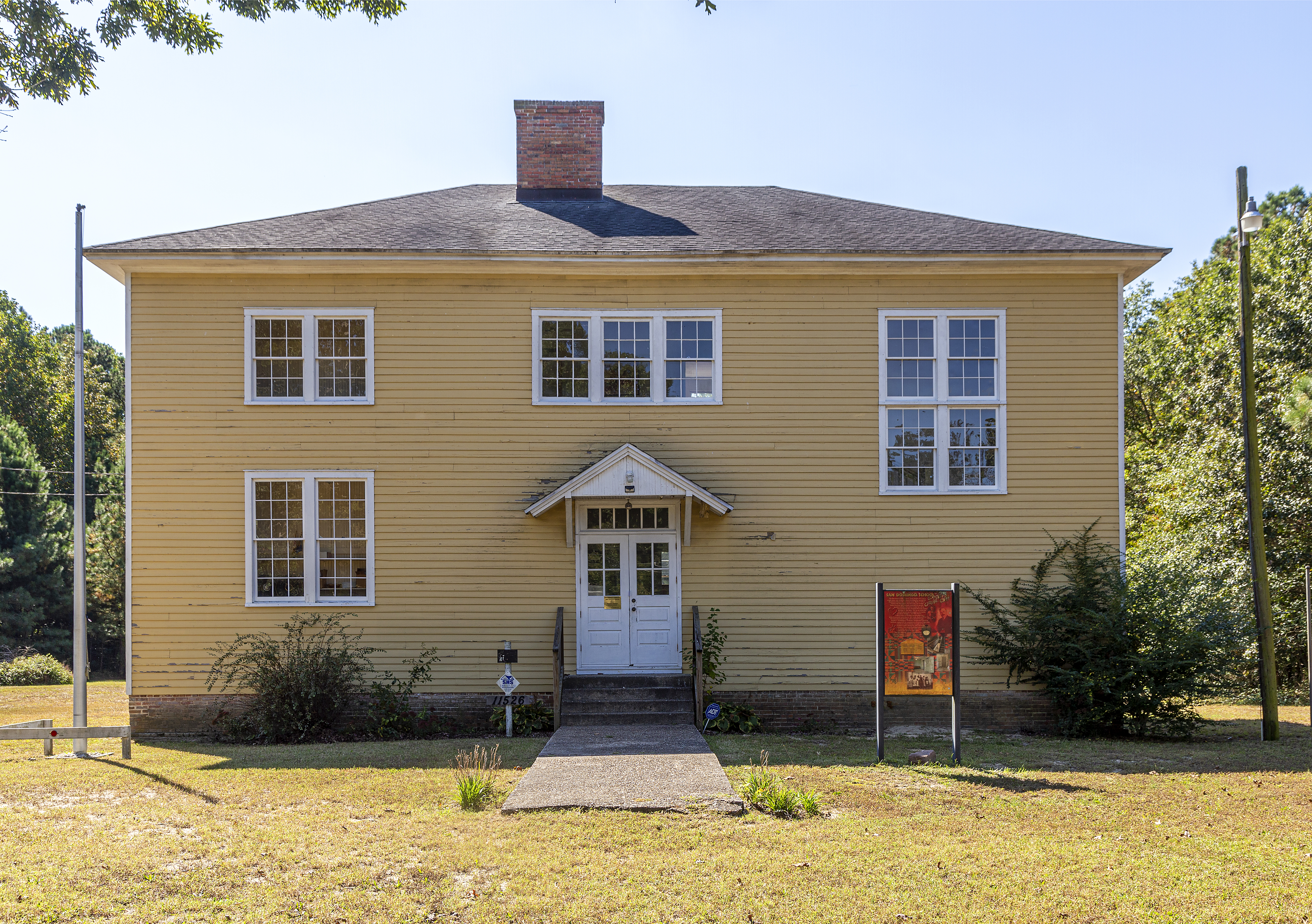
- The school building in 2020

- Location within Maryland
- Location: 11526 Old School Rd., Sharptown, Maryland
- Coordinates: 38°30′39″N 75°43′22″W
- Area: 1.7 acres (0.69 ha)
- Built: 1919
- Built by: Gravenor, W.D., & Brother
- Architectural style: Late 19th- 20th Century Revivals

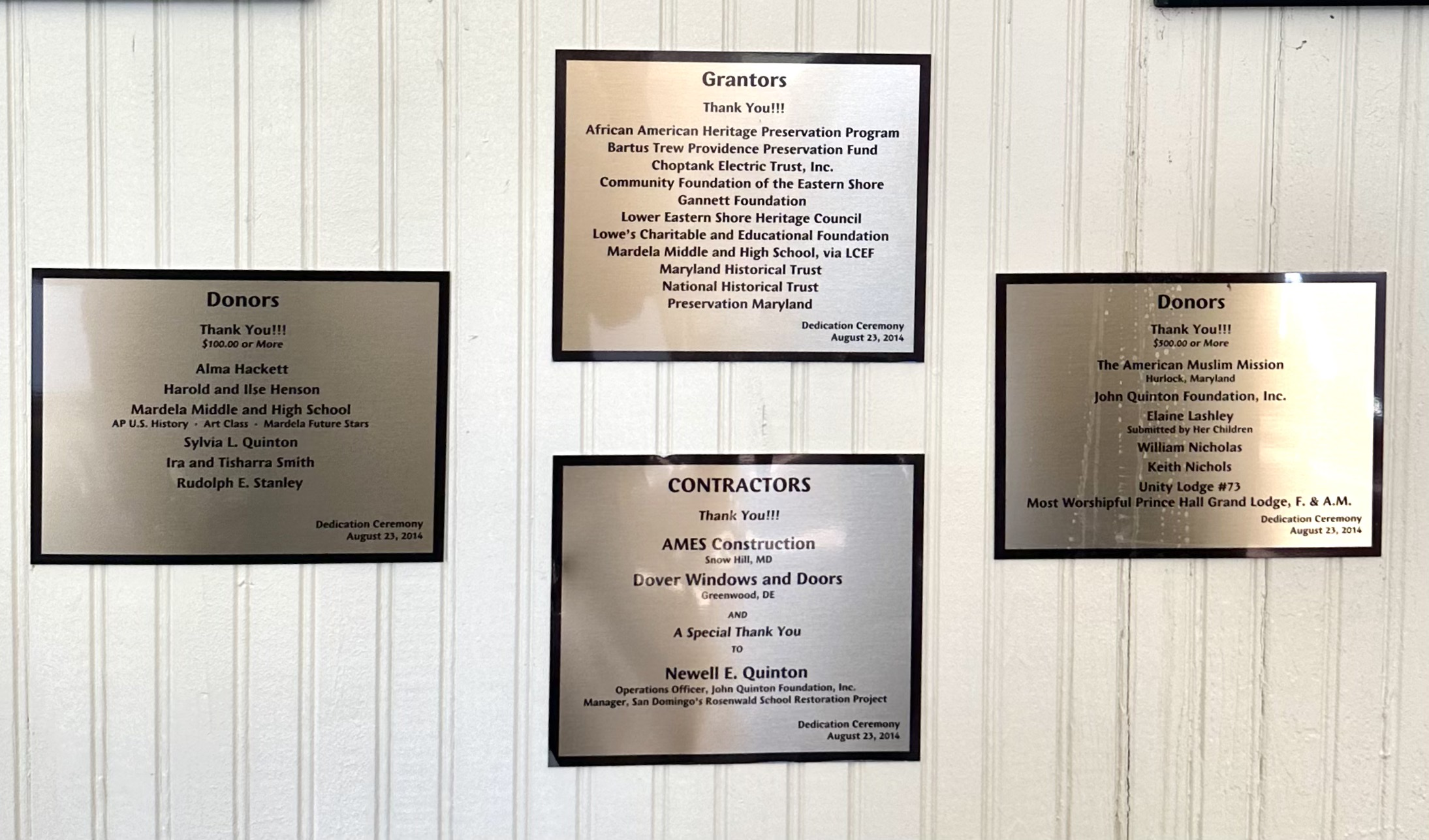
Image shows plaques with the Grantors, Donors, and Contractors of San Domingo school on them, giving them thanks for their help with the building and restoration.

San Domingo School, also known as Sharptown Colored School and Prince Hall Masons Unity Lodge No. 73, is a historic Rosenwald School building located at Sharptown, Wicomico County, Maryland. It was built in 1919, and is a two-story, rectangular frame building with a hipped roof. It is one of four surviving Rosenwald schools in Wicomico County. The school had only four teachers and remained in use as a school until 1957.

It was listed on the National Register of Historic Places in 2007. It received approval from the National Park Service in 2024 as a candidate to be a National Park Service unit.

== Background ==
=== The San Domingo Community ===
The community of San Domingo first appeared in the 1820 census record from Somerset County. At this time, the community had no name; it was only represented by 106 undivided households headed by freed black people. San Domingo is believed to be named after Santo Domingo, a location in the Dominican Republic where the first successful slave revolt took place. The intention of choosing the name San Domingo is unknown, one possibility is that it was meant to act as a warning to those who would wish to harm its members. The community itself was built on land owned by its members, something that was rare in a time when most freed black people lived and worked on land owned by others. San Domingo had its own businesses, church, and school that the members ran making it a self-sufficient community.

=== Funding ===
The Black community all over Maryland's Eastern Shore wasn’t given the resources to have an equitable access to education until 1872 when it was legally implemented, even though Freedman’s Bureau was making efforts before this to provide them with some education. The San Domingo school was one of many schools created during the time of Julius Rosenwald’s Fund he created after becoming a partial owner of the Sears, Roebuck Co. With Booker T. Washington. The funding came from the local Black community, Rosenwald, and The Salisbury High school contributing to creating the school in San Domingo.

== Present day ==
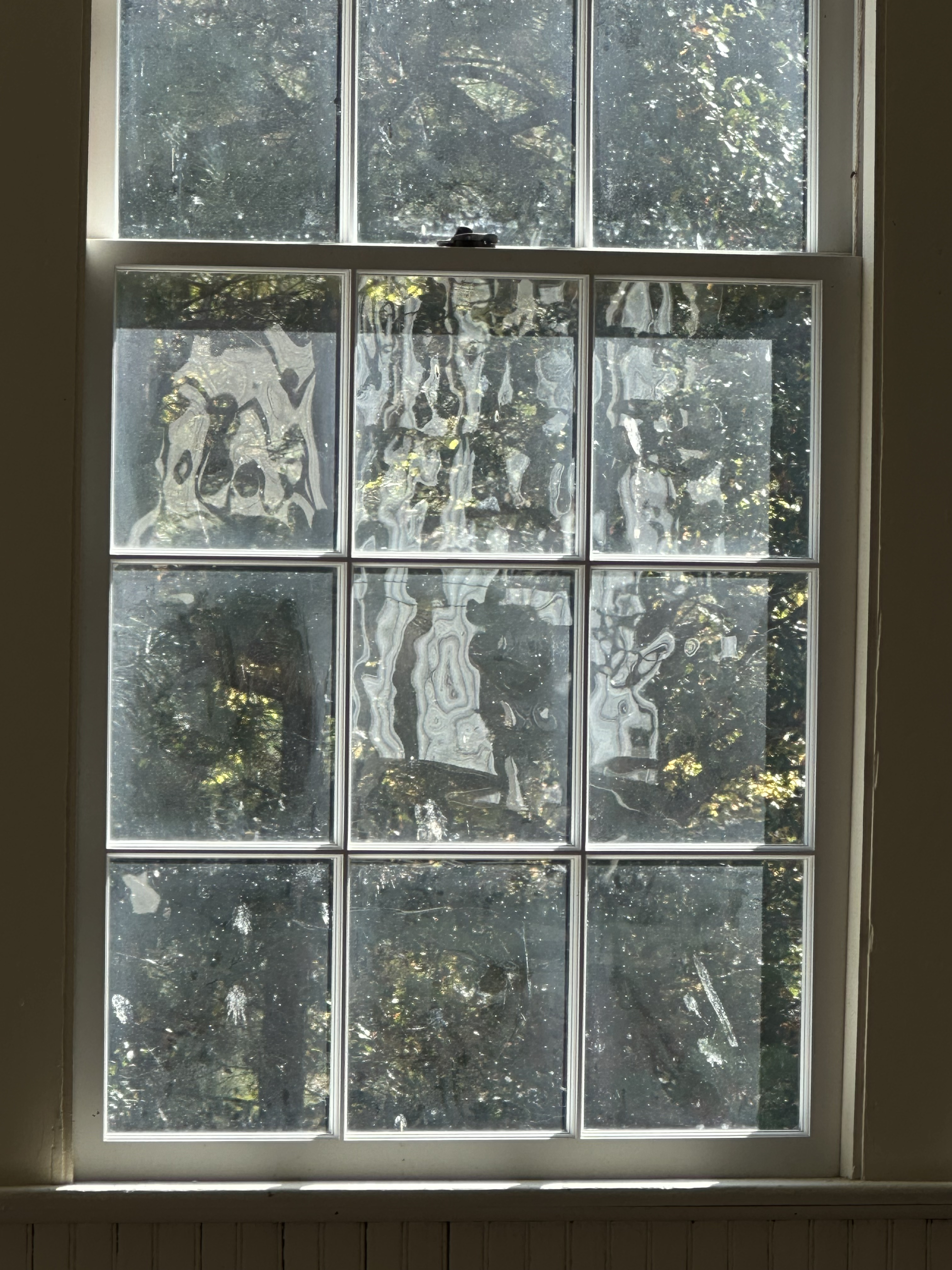
Restoration of the original windows in the San Domingo school

=== Funding ===
It wasn't until 2002 when the National Trust for Historic Preservation announced that all remaining Rosenwald schools are on its list of most endangered historic places. Before this announcement, alumni who once attended what used to be the school, were reaching into their own pockets and partnering with local government to raise funding for the restoration of the building. In order for the grants to be accessed, the restoration had to keep as much of the original flooring, windows, architectural structure, etc. as possible. Very minor changes were done to the building in order for it to be more useful today as a Cultural Center. Roughly $200,000 in grants were given to help restore this historic building so it can not only be remembered, but also used as a Cultural Center for its community. This funding came from a variety of organizations including the National Trust for Historic Preservation, the Maryland Historical Trust, Preservation Maryland, and the Community Foundation of the Eastern Shore. Local donations were also accepted. Some organizations include The American Muslim Mission, Most Worship Prince Hall Grand Lodge, Mardela Middle and High School. Some individuals who donated are John Quinton descendent Alma Hackett, Harold and Ilse Henson, and Keith Nicholas (see photo). A plaque is hung in the main room of the Cultural Center to show those who donated to help keep this historical building alive.
