= Tussocky Branch (Broad Creek tributary) =

Stream in Delaware, USA

Tussocky Branch Tributary to Broad Creek
- Location of Tussocky Branch mouth Tussocky Branch (Broad Creek tributary) (the United States)

Location
- Country: United States
- State: Delaware
- County: Sussex

Physical characteristics
- Source: Barren Creek divide
  - location: about 1 mile east of Susan Beach Corner, Delaware
  - coordinates: 38°28′11″N 075°37′22″W
  - elevation: 50 ft (15 m)
- Mouth: Broad Creek
  - location: Portsville, Delaware
  - coordinates: 38°33′47″N 075°37′47″W
  - elevation: 0 ft (0 m)
- Length: 7.54 mi (12.13 km)
- Basin size: 10.49 square miles (27.2 km^{2})
- Discharge
  - location: Broad Creek
  - average: 12.17 cu ft/s (0.345 m^{3}/s) at mouth with Broad Creek

Basin features
- Progression: Broad Creek → Nanticoke River → Chesapeake Bay → Atlantic Ocean
- River system: Nanticoke River
- Tributaries
  - left: Wheeling Branch; Turkey Branch
  - right: Mill Branch
- Waterbodies: Tussock Pond; Portsville Millpond
- Bridges: Susan Beach Road, Branch School Road, DE 24, Airport Road, Shell Bridge Road

Tussocky Branch is a 7.54 mi (12.13 km) long 2nd order tributary to Broad Creek in Sussex County, Delaware.

== Variant names ==
According to the Geographic Names Information System, it has also been known historically as:

- Mill Creek

== Course ==
Tussocky Branch rises about 1 mile east of Susan Beach Corner, Delaware and then flows north into Broad Creek at Portsville.

== Watershed ==
Tussocky Branch drains 10.49 square miles (27.2 km^{2}) of area, receives about 44.7 in/year of precipitation, has a topographic wetness index of 812.43 and is about 12% forested.

== See also ==
- List of Delaware rivers
