= La Mission =

La Mission, French for "The Mission", may refer to:

- La Mission, short name referring to Bordeaux wine producer Château La Mission Haut-Brion or its wine
- La Mission (film), a 2009 American drama film

== See also ==
- The Mission (disambiguation)
