= Misión, Baja California Sur =

- Location in Mexico
- Coordinates: 25°0′5″N 111°43′20″W
- Country: Mexico
- State: Baja California Sur

Misión is a town in Baja California Sur, Mexico.
