= Town commissioners (disambiguation) =

Town commissioners were governing bodies in smaller towns in Ireland from 1828 to 2001.

Town commissioners may also refer to:

- Town commissioners (Isle of Man), governing bodies of certain towns in the Isle of Man
- Governing bodies of certain towns in the United States; see
  - City commission government for the type of government; and
  - Town#United States for the difference between "town" and "city" (which varies by state)
