= Little Creek (Broad Creek tributary) =

Stream in Delaware, USA

Little Creek Tributary to Broad Creek
- Location of Little Creek mouth Little Creek (Broad Creek tributary) (the United States)

Location
- Country: United States
- State: Delaware
- County: Sussex
- City: Laurel

Physical characteristics
- Source: confluence of Meadow Branch and Holly Branch
  - location: about 2 miles south of Laurel, Delaware
  - coordinates: 38°31′16″N 075°34′42″W
  - elevation: 23 ft (7.0 m)
- Mouth: Broad Creek
  - location: Laurel, Delaware
  - coordinates: 38°33′39″N 075°35′16″W
  - elevation: 0 ft (0 m)
- Length: 3.63 mi (5.84 km)
- Basin size: 17.36 square miles (45.0 km^{2})
- Discharge
  - location: Broad Creek
  - average: 20.47 cu ft/s (0.580 m^{3}/s) at mouth with Broad Creek

Basin features
- Progression: Broad Creek → Nanticoke River → Chesapeake Bay → Atlantic Ocean
- River system: Nanticoke River
- Tributaries
  - left: Holly Branch
  - right: Meadow Branch
- Waterbodies: Horseys Pond
- Bridges: Dickerson Road, Sharptown Road, Portsville Road

Little Creek is a 3.63 mi (5.84 km) long 3rd order tributary to Broad Creek in Sussex County, Delaware.

== Variant names ==
According to the Geographic Names Information System, this geographic feature has been recorded under alternative historical names.

- Meadow Branch

== Course ==
Little Creek is formed at the confluence of Meadow Branch and Holly Branch about 1 mile south of Laurel, Delaware and then flows north into Broad Creek at Laurel.

== Watershed ==
Little Creek drains 17.36 square miles (45.0 km^{2}) of area, receives about 45.0 in/year of precipitation, has a topographic wetness index of 746.39 and is about 10% forested.

== See also ==
- List of Delaware rivers
