= La Misión, Salta =

Coordinates: 26°14′S 58°38′W

La Misión (Salta)
- Municipality and village
- Interactive map of La Misión (Salta)
- Country: Argentina
- Province: Salta Province
- Time zone: UTC−3 (ART)

La Misión (Salta) is a village and rural municipality in Salta Province in northwestern Argentina.
