= Craftsman furniture =

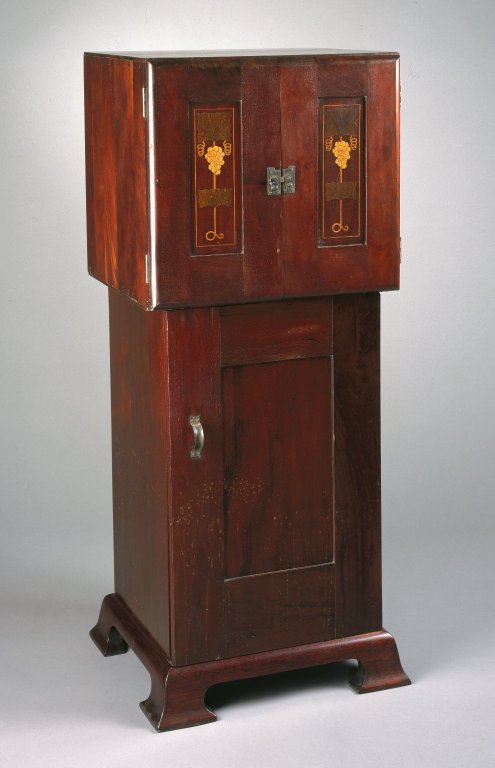
Gustav Stickley, possibly Harvey Ellis. Music Cabinet, 1902-1904

Craftsman furniture refers to the Arts and Crafts Movement style furniture of Gustav Stickley's Craftsman Workshops.

== History ==
Stickley began making American Craftsman furniture in 1900, though he did not change the name of his firm to the Craftsman Workshops until 1903. It was sometimes popularly referred to as Mission Style Furniture, a term which Stickley despised. The company ceased making furniture in 1916.
