= Portsville, Delaware =

Unincorporated community in Delaware, United States

- Unincorporated community
- Location within Delaware Location within the United States
- Coordinates: 38°33′43″N 75°37′48″W
- Country: United States
- State: Delaware
- County: Sussex
- Elevation: 13 ft (4.0 m)
- Time zone: UTC-5 (Eastern (EST))
  - Summer (DST): UTC-4 (EDT)
- Area code: 302
- GNIS feature ID: 216186

Portsville is an unincorporated community in Sussex County, Delaware, United States. Portsville is located on the southern bank of Broad Creek, 0.8 miles (1.3 km) southwest of Bethel. The Portsville Lighthouse, which is listed on the National Register of Historic Places, is located in Portsville.

There is an 8.6 acre pond nearby called Tussock Pond.
