= Bundicks Branch (Love Creek tributary) =

Stream in Delaware USA

Bundicks Branch Tributary to Love Creek
- Location within Delaware Location within the United States

Location
- Country: United States
- State: Delaware
- County: Sussex

Physical characteristics
- Source: Simpler Branch divide
  - location: about 0.5 miles west of Anderson Corner
  - coordinates: 38°42′00″N 075°16′48″W
  - elevation: 42 ft (13 m)
- Mouth: Love Creek
  - location: Goslee Millpond
  - coordinates: 38°43′06″N 075°11′25″W
  - elevation: 3 ft (0.91 m)
- Length: 7.01 mi (11.28 km)
- Basin size: 7.00 square miles (18.1 km^{2})
- Discharge
  - average: 8.31 cu ft/s (0.235 m^{3}/s) at mouth with Love Creek

Basin features
- Progression: generally east
- River system: Rehoboth Bay
- Tributaries
  - left: unnamed tributaries
  - right: unnamed tributaries
- Bridges: Rust Road; Harbeson Road; Cool Spring Road; Hopkins Road; DE 23

Bundicks Branch is a 7.01 mi (11.28 km) long 1st order tributary to Love Creek, in Sussex County, Delaware.

== Variant names ==
According to the Geographic Names Information System, it has also been known historically as:

- Bundick's Creek

== Course ==
Bundicks Branch rises on the Simpler Branch divide about 0.5 miles west of Anderson Corner in Sussex County, Delaware. Bundicks Branch then flows generally east to meet Love Creek within Goslee Millpond.

== Watershed ==
Bundicks Branch drains 7.00 square miles (18.1 km^{2}) of area, receives about 45.2 in/year of precipitation, has a topographic wetness index of 640.38 and is about 27.7% forested.

== See also ==
- List of rivers of Delaware
