= The Mission (Vacaville, California) =

Coordinates: 38.3674°N 121.9349°W

The Mission is a nondenominational apostolic Christian church in Vacaville, California.

== History ==
The Mission church was formerly the Vaca Valley Christian Life Center and associated with the Assemblies of God, a major Pentecostal denomination. The Vaca Valley Christian Life Center ("V.V.C.L.C." for short) was originally located on Chandler Street in Vacaville but relocated to its current location on Leisure Town Road in the early 1990s under the direction of its then-pastor Jerry Hanoum.

The Vaca Valley Christian Life Center hosted youth summer camps by the name of "Cram Camp" and "Heatwave," including a weeklong waterski trip called "Summer Splash."

In 1999, the Vaca Valley Christian Life Center gave $15,000 to help a fellow church, Valley Church, purchase a piece of property fronting its rural Vacaville home.

The Vaca Valley Christian Life Center participated in a 2000 study by Reverend Jason Rhode and Reverend David Boyd, in cooperation with the National Children's Ministry Agency of the Assemblies of God, titled "The Technological Revolution in Children's Ministry Research Study."

The senior leaders at The Mission, as of 2021, are David Crone and Deborah Crone. In April of 2021, Mission Music Academy at The Mission returned to in-person music classes following the COVID-19 pandemic.

== Name change ==
In the mid-2000s, the Vaca Valley Christian Life Center dissociated from the Assemblies of God and changed its name to The Mission, citing differences related to the role of the Holy Spirit and "Kingdom" living in an open letter regarding the withdrawal from the Assemblies of God.

== Death of Pastor Jerry Hanoum ==
In 2011 former pastor Jerry Hanoum committed suicide after being placed under investigation regarding financial dealings related to a different church after his tenure at Vaca Valley Christian Life Center, Mountain View Christian Center in Oakley, California.
