= Mission, Delaware =

Unincorporated community in Delaware, United States

- Unincorporated community
- Location within Delaware Location within the United States
- Coordinates: 38°32′47″N 75°21′16″W
- Country: United States
- State: Delaware
- County: Sussex
- Elevation: 43 ft (13 m)
- Time zone: UTC-5 (Eastern (EST))
  - Summer (DST): UTC-4 (EDT)
- Area code: 302
- GNIS feature ID: 216158

Mission is an unincorporated community in Sussex County, Delaware, United States. Mission is located along state routes 24 and 30, southwest of Millsboro.
