= Midway, Delaware =

Unincorporated community in Delaware, United States

- Unincorporated community
- Location within the state of Delaware Midway (the United States)
- Coordinates: 38°43′41″N 75°07′46″W
- Country: United States
- State: Delaware
- County: Sussex
- Time zone: UTC-5 (Eastern (EST))
  - Summer (DST): UTC-4 (EDT)

Midway is an unincorporated area in Sussex County, Delaware, United States. It is located "midway" between Rehoboth Beach and Lewes along Delaware Route 1 at the intersection with Delaware Route 24. The community is part of the Salisbury, Maryland-Delaware Metropolitan Statistical Area.
