= Mission style furniture =

American decorative arts style

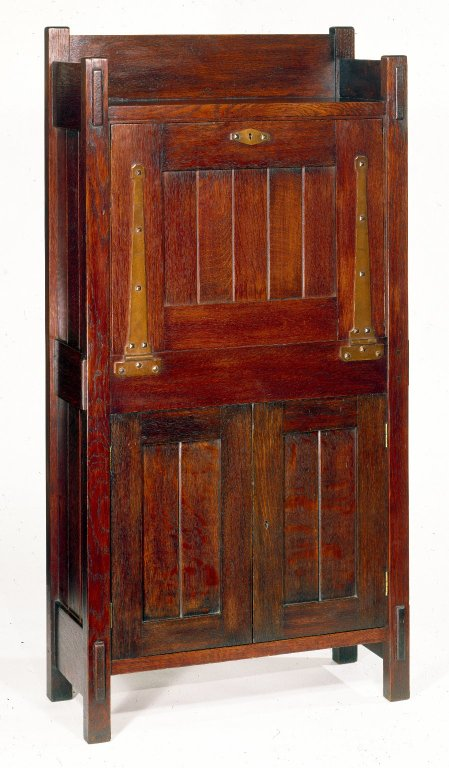
Gustav Stickley. Dropfront Desk, ca. 1903. Brooklyn Museum

Mission furniture is a style of furniture that originated in the late 19th century. It traces its origins to a chair made by A.J. Forbes around 1894 for San Francisco's Swedenborgian Church. The term mission furniture was first popularized by Joseph P. McHugh of New York, a furniture manufacturer and retailer who copied these chairs and offered a line of stylistically related furnishings by 1898. The word mission references the Spanish missions throughout colonial California, though the design of most Mission Style furniture owed little to the original furnishings of these missions. The style became increasingly popular following the 1901 Pan-American Exposition in Buffalo. The style was popularly associated with the American Arts and Crafts movement.

== Design philosophy ==
Mission style is a design that emphasizes simple horizontal and vertical lines and flat panels that accentuate the grain of the wood (often oak, especially quartersawn white oak). People were looking for relief after the excesses of Victorian times and the influx of mass-produced furniture from the Industrial Revolution. The furniture maker Gustav Stickley produced Arts and Crafts movement furniture often referred to as being in the Mission Style, though Stickley dismissed the term as misleading. This was plain oak furniture that was upright, solid, and suggestive of entirely handcrafted work, though in the case of Stickley and his competitors, was constructed within a factory by both machine and handworking techniques.

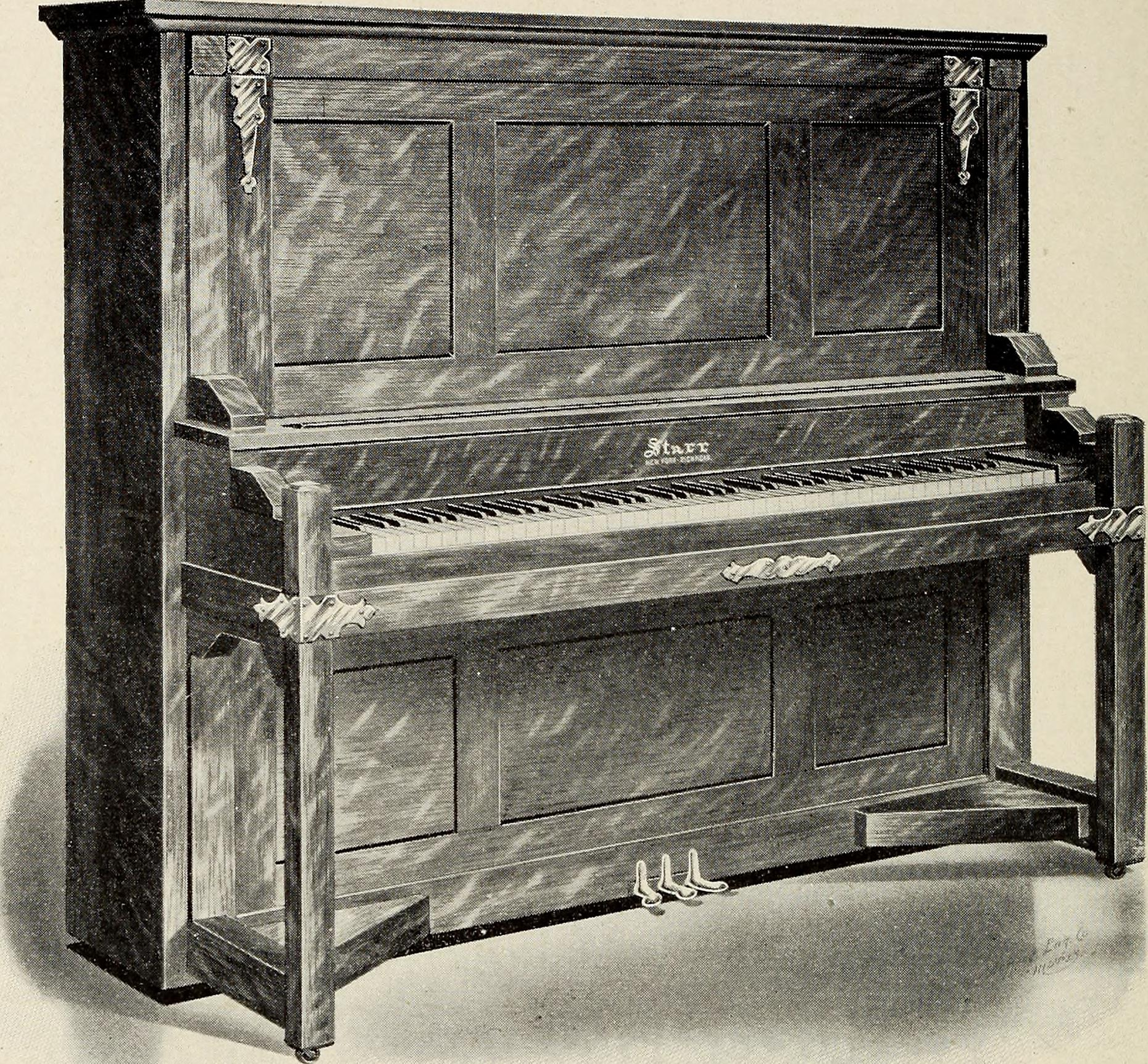
A Starr mission style piano (illustrated in 1906)

== Influential people and companies ==
Many designers and companies played an important role in the development of the design over the years. Gustav Stickley, L. & J.G. Stickley, Stickley Brothers, Charles Limbert, Grand Rapids Bookcase and Chair Company (Lifetime), The Shop of the Crafters and Ford Johnson.

== See also ==
- Craftsman furniture
