= Spanish Mission =

Spanish Mission may refer to:

- Spanish Colonial Revival architecture
- Mission Revival Style architecture
- Spanish missions, institutions established by Catholic religious orders under the auspices of the Spanish crown to convert indigenous peoples of the Americas and Asia
