= Horseys Pond =

- Location within Delaware Location within the United States
- Location: Sussex County, Delaware
- Coordinates: 38.53843°N 75.57774°W
- Type: Reservoir

Horseys Pond is a freshwater reservoir in Laurel, Delaware. It is located to the south of Laurel, with Little Creek linking the pond to the Broad Creek Hundred.
