= Alliance to End Human Trafficking =

Nonprofit organization in Michigan

- Formation: 2013
- Headquarters: Chicago, Michigan

The Alliance to End Human Trafficking is a faith-based nonprofit that addresses the global crisis of human trafficking via advocacy, education, and support. It also provides access to services for survivors. It was founded in 2013 by a group of Catholic sisters already taking part in anti-trafficking initiatives, and the original name was U. S. Catholic Sisters Against Human Trafficking. It unites coalitions with religious congregations and individuals who all work in this area. Its executive director is Katie Boller Gosewisch. On July 14, 2026, they gathered on Capitol Hill to lobby Congress for speedy passage of bipartisan legislation against human trafficking.
