= Sharptown, Maryland =

- Town
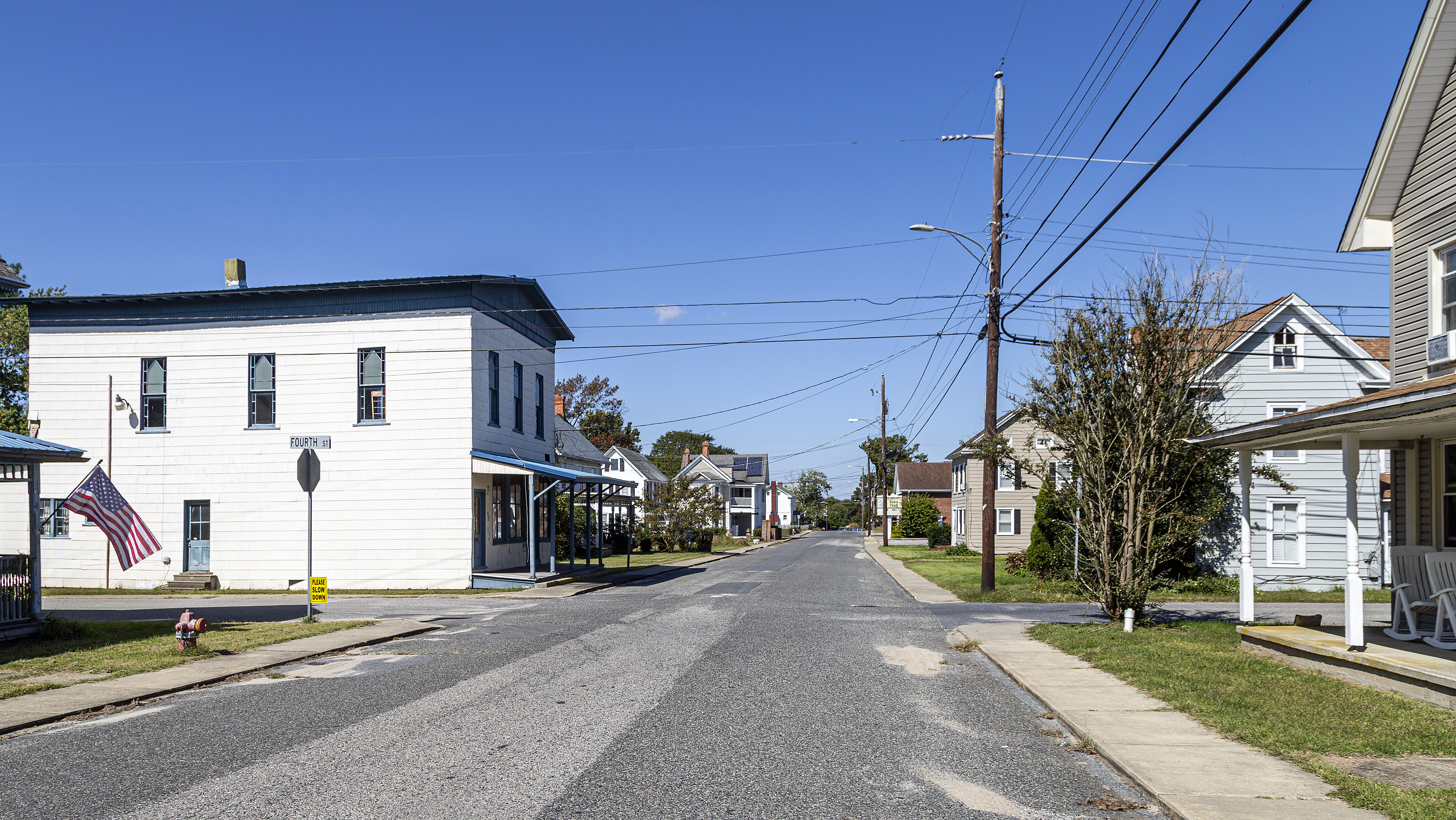
- The center of Sharptown in 2020

- Location of Sharptown, Maryland
- Coordinates: 38°32′26″N 75°43′8″W
- Country: United States
- State: Maryland
- County: Wicomico
- Incorporated: 1874

Government
  - Type: Town commissioners
  - Commissioner: Member List: P. Douglas Gosnell, President; Jerry L. Bennett, Chair; Cecil B. Bradley; Matthew V. Schneider; George E. Henry

Area
  - Total: 0.42 sq mi (1.09 km^{2})
  - Land: 0.42 sq mi (1.09 km^{2})
  - Water: 0 sq mi (0.00 km^{2})
- Elevation: 9.8 ft (3 m)

Population (2020)
  - Total: 691
  - Density: 1,635.1/sq mi (631.33/km^{2})
- Time zone: UTC-5 (Eastern (EST))
  - Summer (DST): UTC-4 (EDT)
- ZIP code: 21861
- Area codes: 410, 443
- FIPS code: 24-71650
- GNIS feature ID: 0591265
- Website: www.townofsharptown.org

Sharptown is a town in Wicomico County, Maryland, United States. As of the 2020 census, Sharptown had a population of 691. It is included in the Salisbury, Maryland-Delaware Metropolitan Statistical Area.

== History ==
San Domingo School was listed on the National Register of Historic Places in 2007.

== Geography ==
Sharptown is located at 38°32′26″N 75°43′8″W (38.540630, -75.719021).

According to the United States Census Bureau, the town has a total area of 0.46 square miles (1.19 km^{2}), of which 0.41 square miles (1.06 km^{2}) is land and 0.05 square miles (0.13 km^{2}) is water.

== Demographics ==
Historical population
Census	Pop.	Note	%±
1880	411		—
1890	427		3.9%
1900	529		23.9%
1910	722		36.5%
1920	713		−1.2%
1930	727		2.0%
1940	653		−10.2%
1950	680		4.1%
1960	620		−8.8%
1970	660		6.5%
1980	654		−0.9%
1990	609		−6.9%
2000	649		6.6%
2010	651		0.3%
2020	691		6.1%
U.S. Decennial Census

=== 2010 census ===
As of the census of 2010, there were 651 people, 251 households, and 176 families living in the town. The population density was 1,587.8 inhabitants per square mile (613.1/km^{2}). There were 290 housing units at an average density of 707.3 per square mile (273.1/km^{2}). The racial makeup of the town was 92.6% White, 5.1% African American, 0.5% Asian, and 1.8% from two or more races. Hispanic or Latino of any race were 2.2% of the population.

There were 251 households, of which 35.9% had children under the age of 18 living with them, 52.2% were married couples living together, 11.6% had a female householder with no husband present, 6.4% had a male householder with no wife present, and 29.9% were non-families. 23.5% of all households were made up of individuals, and 9.6% had someone living alone who was 65 years of age or older. The average household size was 2.59 and the average family size was 3.06.

The median age in the town was 39.2 years. 26.1% of residents were under the age of 18; 6.7% were between the ages of 18 and 24; 25.7% were from 25 to 44; 26.8% were from 45 to 64; and 14.7% were 65 years of age or older. The gender makeup of the town was 46.4% male and 53.6% female.

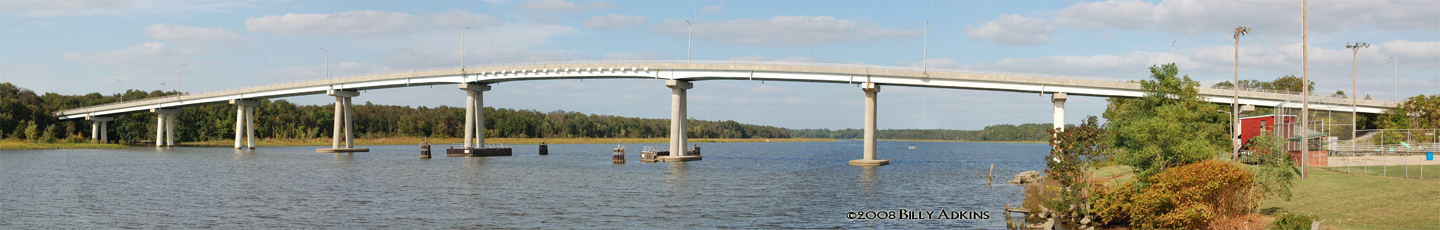

=== 2000 census ===
As of the census of 2000, there were 649 people, 258 households, and 180 families living in the town. The population density was 1,581.2 inhabitants per square mile (610.5/km^{2}). There were 283 housing units at an average density of 689.5 per square mile (266.2/km^{2}). The racial makeup of the town was 94.92% White, 3.70% African American, 0.15% Asian, and 1.23% from two or more races. Hispanic or Latino of any race were 0.31% of the population.

There were 258 households, out of which 32.9% had children under the age of 18 living with them, 54.7% were married couples living together, 10.5% had a female householder with no husband present, and 30.2% were non-families. 26.0% of all households were made up of individuals, and 14.0% had someone living alone who was 65 years of age or older. The average household size was 2.52 and the average family size was 3.00.

In the town, the population was spread out, with 25.3% under the age of 18, 5.2% from 18 to 24, 31.1% from 25 to 44, 21.9% from 45 to 64, and 16.5% who were 65 years of age or older. The median age was 38 years. For every 100 females, there were 88.1 males. For every 100 females age 18 and over, there were 90.2 males.

The median income for a household in the town was $40,200, and the median income for a family was $44,500. Males had a median income of $31,125 versus $18,977 for females. The per capita income for the town was $15,190. About 4.5% of families and 8.1% of the population were below the poverty line, including 14.1% of those under age 18 and 13.3% of those age 65 or over.
