= Ramakrishna Mission Home of Service =

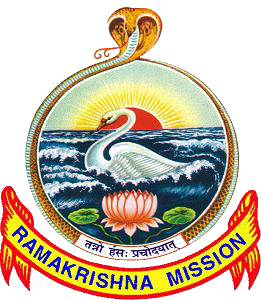
- Emblem
- Formation: 1900
- Type: NGO
- Purpose: Health
- Headquarters: Varanasi, India
- Coordinates: 25.306731°N 82.997789°E
- Region served: Uttar Pradesh
- Parent organisation: Ramakrishna Mission
- Website: rkmhos.org

Ramakrishna Mission Home of Service is an Indian non-governmental organisation (NGO) located in Varanasi (formerly known as Banaras), established in 1900, and a branch of Ramakrishna Mission since 1902. It manages an education program on essential health issues in schools, slums and villages of Uttar Pradesh (India) thanks to auto-produced multimedia educational movies. It also gives health care and supplies free medicines to penniless people at its charitable hospital and two hospices.

== History ==
Ramakrishna Mission Home of Service was created in 1900 by a group of young men at Varanasi, inspired by the teachings of Swami Vivekananda, in a very modest way with 4 annas (0,25 rupees) as capital which they got by begging. The Home of Service was started by three friends - Jamini Ranjan Majumdar, Charuchandra Das (later Swami Shubhananda) and Kedarnath Moulik (later Swami Achalananda). On 13 June 1900, Jamini Ranjan nursed an old lady pilgrim who was left to die on the wayside and begged food to feed her. Later he got her admitted to Bhelurpur hospital and arranged for her treatment by collecting necessary funds for her treatment. The group searched for suffering and helpless people on the streets and roads of Varanasi, and their principle was to serve them as God, in line with the philosophy propounded by Swami Vivekananda. Thus they formed an organisation called Orphanage or Poor Men's Relief Association. The money for medicines, beds, blankets and other necessities were obtained by individual contributions or by begging. On 13 September 1900, a house was rented for Rs 5/- per month in Ramapura. As the work expanded, the hospital was shifted to a bigger place and attracted attention of the prominent citizens. Swami Vivekananda, when he visited Varanasi in February 1902, was immensely impressed to see the dedicated service of those poor but determined youth and wrote an appeal for funds. He also instructed the group to name the hospital as Ramakrishna Sevashrama or Home of Service. The Sevashrama was affiliated to Ramakrishna Mission on 23 November 1902 and was renamed as Ramakrishna Mission Home of Service. Sister Nivedita went from door to door to collect funds for the sevashrama after Swami Vivekananda died in 1902. Swami Shivananda, who established the Adviata Ashrama in Benares, adjacent to the Home of Service was also a great source of inspiration. In 1903 the President of the Ramakrishna Order, Swami Brahmananda visited the ashrama and wanted to construct a permanent building.

Eventually, the present land in the Luxa area of Varanasi was purchased in 1908. Upendra Narayan Deb and Tarini Charan Pal paid for the land. Swami Brahmananda laid the foundation stone and inaugurated the new building on 7 May 1910. The building was designed by Swami Vijnanananda. The new building had six general wards and three isolation wards to accommodate 46 patients. The local Government approved a grant of Rs 120/- annually. The home had the unique privilege to be blessed by the visit of Holy Mother Sri Sarada Devi on 8 November 1912. She donated a ten rupee note to the sevashrama as a token of her approval for the service rendered to the poor as God. Most of the direct disciples of Sri Ramakrishna visited the Sevashrama including Swami Premananda, Swami Shivananda, Swami Brahmananda, Swami Saradananda, Swami Turiyananda and Swami Akhandananda. As the years went by, the Ramakrishna Mission Home of Service grew in all proportions. New service wings were added. Today this multi-dimensional institution of service (a 230 bedded General Hospital) sprawls into an area of 13 acres (53,000 m^{2}) and specially caters to the needs of the rural poor and underprivileged patients.

== Health Promotion Program ==
The Health Promotion Program started in 2000, and very soon gained the support of famous organisations, such as the World Health Organization, the European Commission, the Sir Dorabji Tata Trust, the British Medical Association and the National Institute of Urban Affairs. It aims at the poor populations from the area of Varanasi, and provides them health education (especially through the Multimedia Health Education Program) but also attends to their essential health needs. In the end, the program's purpose is to ensure a healthy environment for these populations, for their bodies as well as for their minds.

== Gallery ==
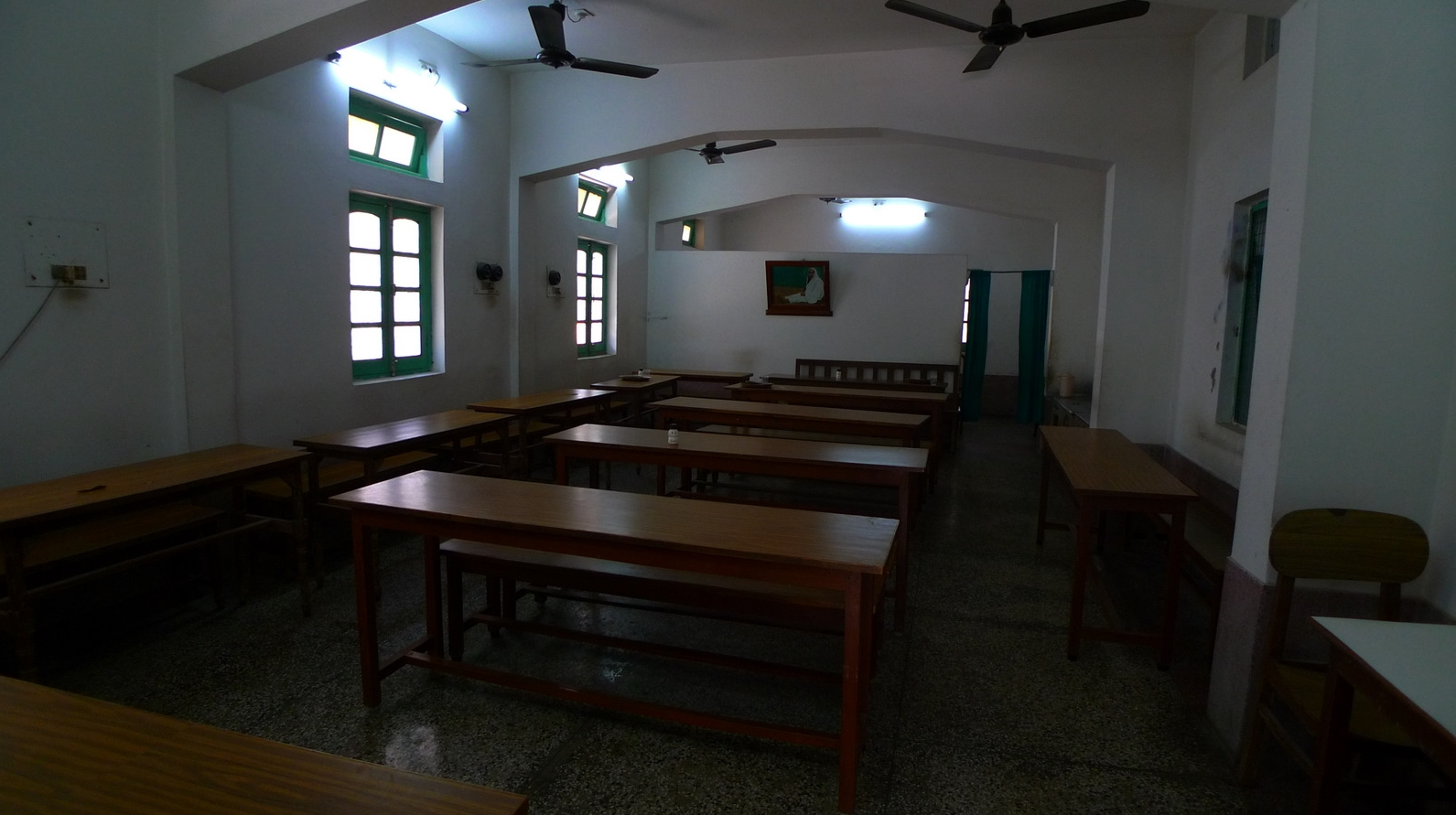
The dining hall

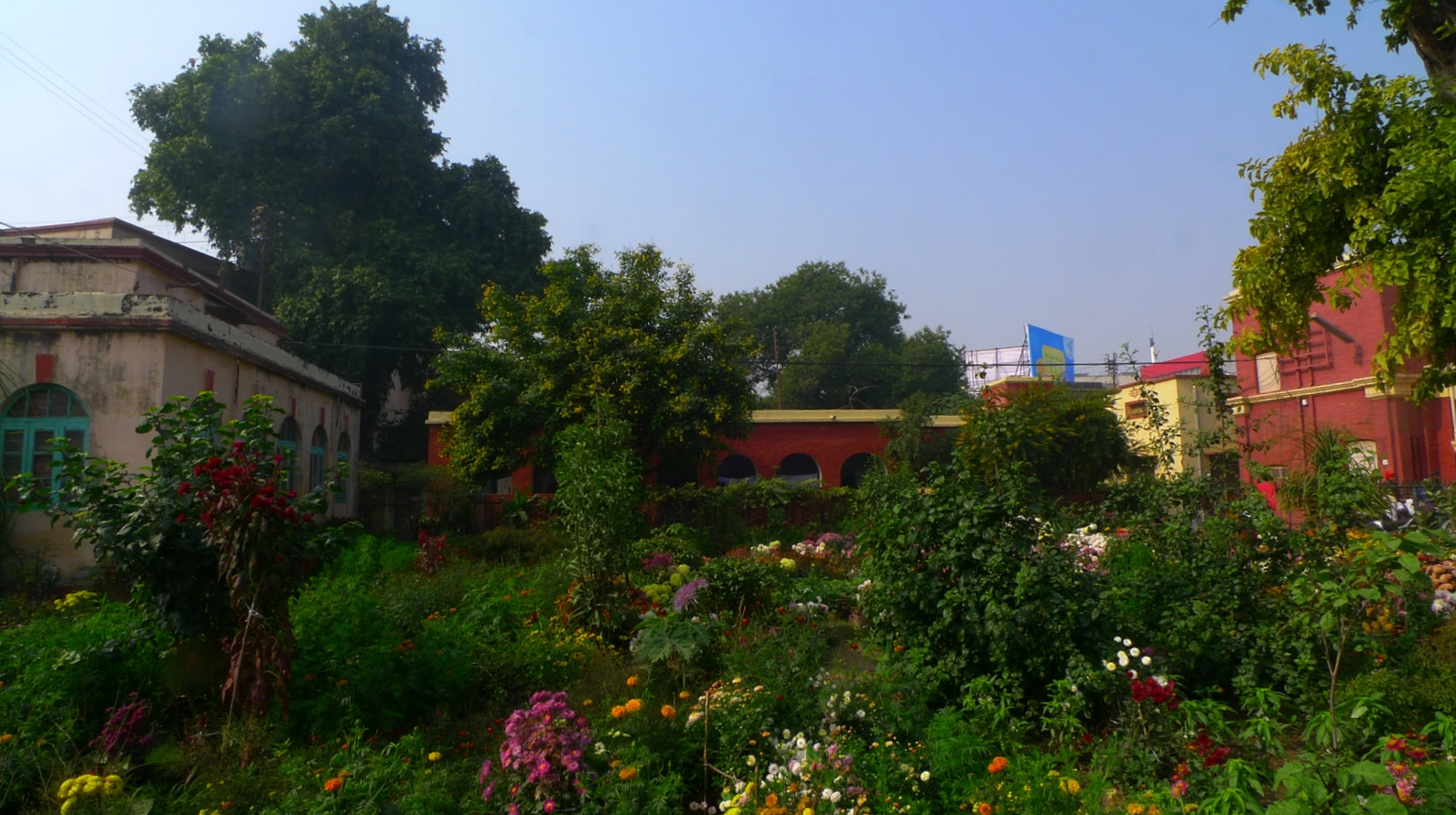
Mission gardens

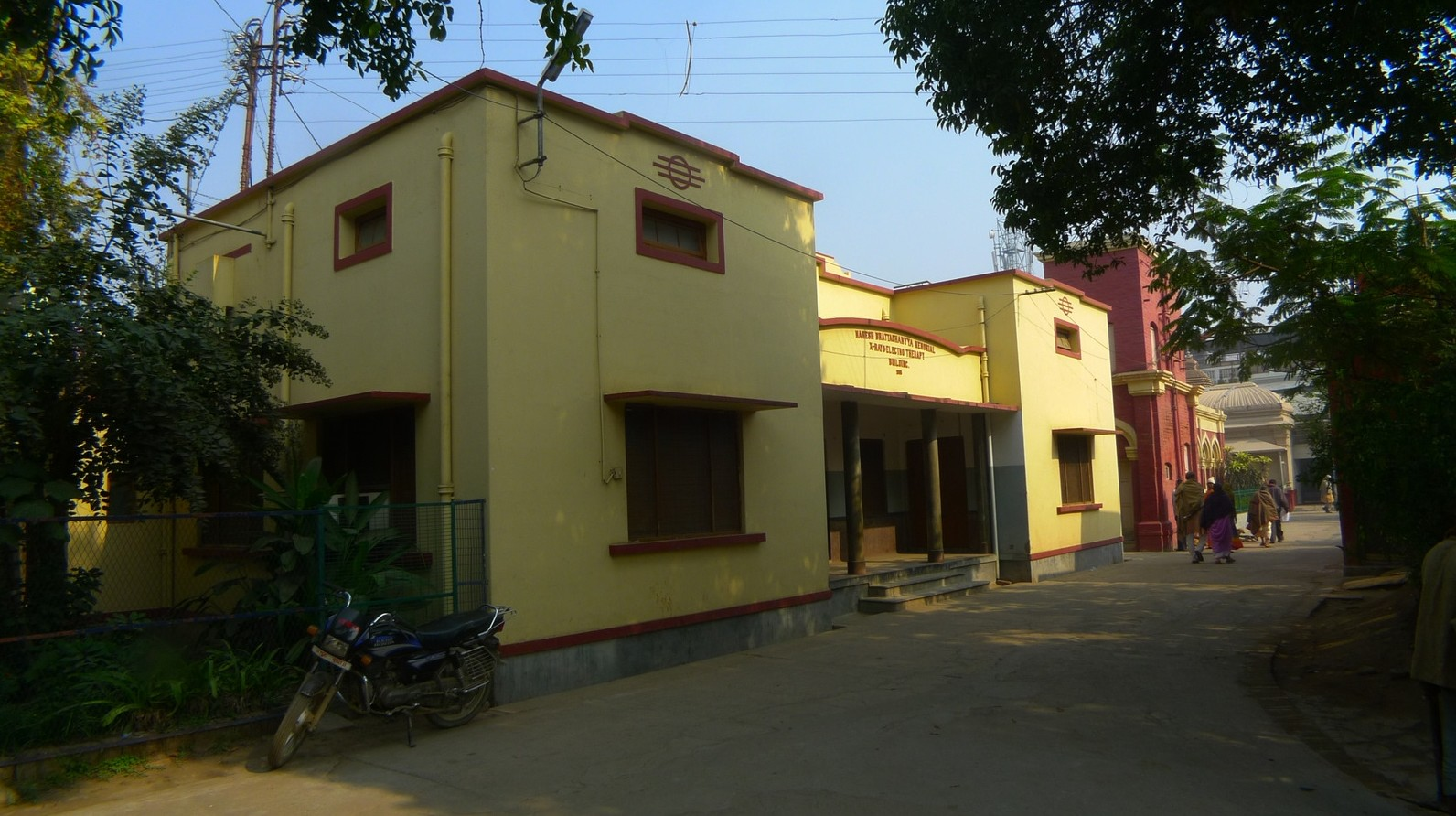
Office department

Social service and health promotion at the Home of Service - Ramakrishna Mission, Varanasi, India
