= James Branch (Broad Creek tributary) =

Stream in Delaware, USA

James Branch Tributary to Broad Creek
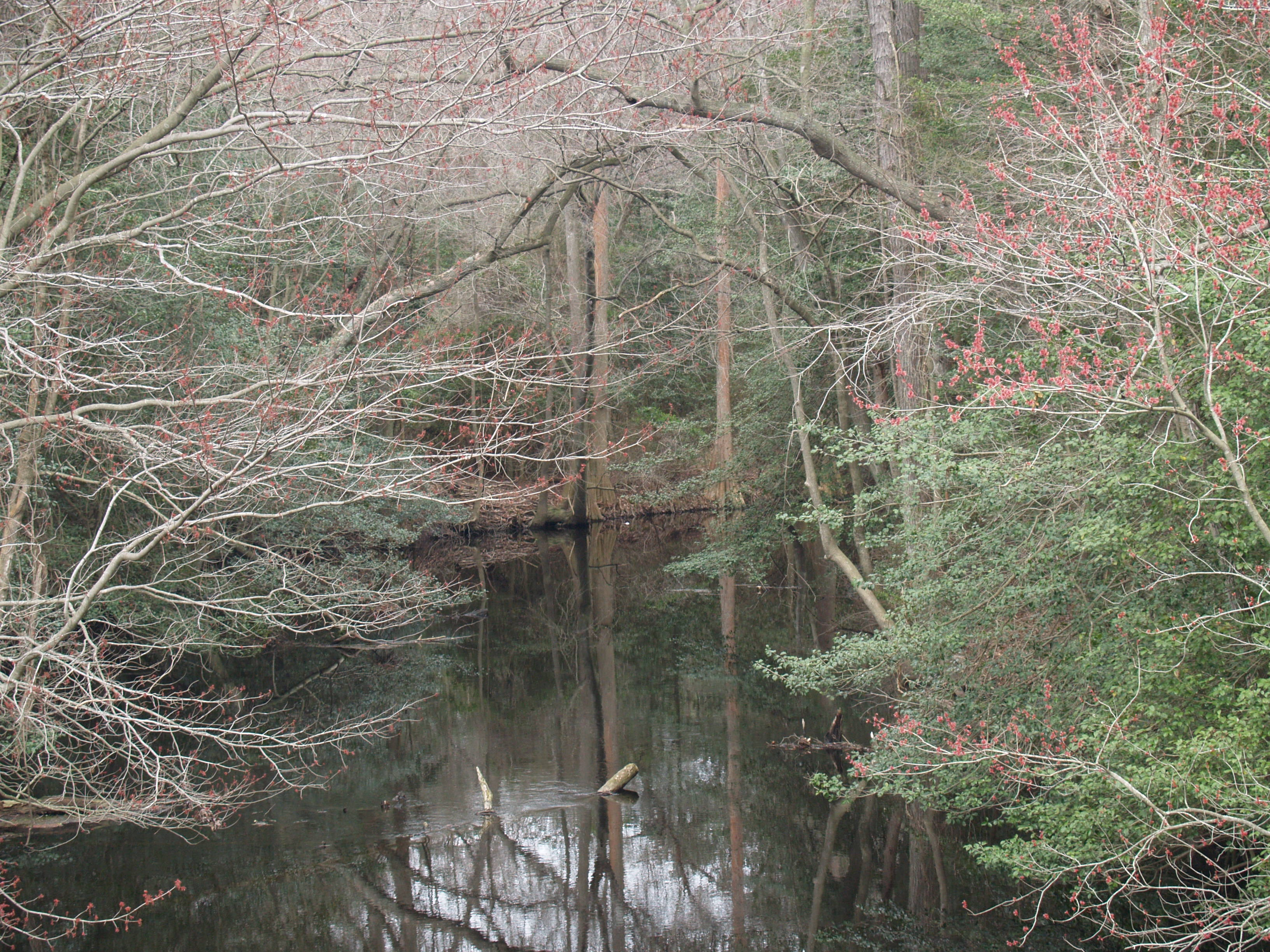
- James Branch looking downstream from DE Route 24 crossing

- Location of James Branch mouth James Branch (Broad Creek tributary) (the United States)

Location
- Country: United States
- State: Delaware; Maryland
- Counties: Sussex; Wicomico

Physical characteristics
- Source: divide between James Branch and Wicomico River
  - location: about 3 miles east of Delmar, Delaware
  - coordinates: 38°27′36″N 075°30′14″W
  - elevation: 55 ft (17 m)
- Mouth: Records Pond (Broad Creek)
  - location: Laurel, Delaware
  - coordinates: 38°33′21″N 075°32′46″W
  - elevation: 3 ft (0.91 m)
- Length: 10.97 mi (17.65 km)
- Basin size: 70.1 square miles (182 km^{2})
- Discharge
  - location: Records Pond (Broad Creek)
  - average: 84.31 cu ft/s (2.387 m^{3}/s) at mouth with Records Pond

Basin features
- Progression: west
- River system: Nanticoke River
- Tributaries
  - left: Old Forge Branch
  - right: Figgs Ditch; Morris Branch; Wards Branch; Hitch Pond Branch; Gordon Branch
- Waterbodies: Ellis Pond; Trussum Pond

James Branch is a 10.97 mi (17.65 km) long tributary to Records Pond (Broad Creek) that rises in northern Wicomico County, Maryland and flows north into Sussex County, Delaware. James Branch is listed as a state-protected paddling trail by Delaware.

== See also ==
- List of Delaware rivers
- List of rivers of Maryland
