= Catholic Home Missions =

Organization to support poor dioceses in the United States

The Catholic Home Missions is an organization founded in 1924 by the American Board of Catholic Missions (ABCM) with the aim of helping and supporting poor dioceses in the United States. Their effort focuses principally on providing religious education. Since 1998 U.S. bishops have conducted an annual appeal in parishes across the country, with the proceeds going to dioceses in the United States and its territories.

== History ==
In 1919 missionary directors from throughout the United States met at the University of Notre Dame to organize a national missionary society, the American Board of Catholic Missions, to serve the missions at home and abroad. Their focus was soon changed when the Society for the Propagation of the Faith was founded in Rome, with offices in countries around the world, for the support of missions worldwide. In 1924 the national mission society was refounded as a society in support of those missions in the United States and its territories that did not receive funds from the Propagation of the Faith. In 1972 ABCM became the Bishops' Committee on the Home Missions, a standing committee of the United States Conference of Catholic Bishops (USCCB).

== Work ==
In 2016 parish collections across the United States provided $9 million for programs in 84 dioceses, ranging from evangelization, to Hispanic ministry, to education for seminarians and lay ministers. An annual report is produced by the USCCB Subcommittee on Catholic Home Missions. The Subcommittee also produces a quarterly newsletter Neighbors which acquaints Catholics with the various missionary works being subsidized.

== See also ==
- Catholic Church in the United States
