= Broad Creek (Nanticoke River tributary) =

Stream in Delaware, USA

Broad Creek Tributary to Nanticoke River
- Location of Broad Creek mouth Broad Creek (Nanticoke River tributary) (the United States)

Location
- Country: United States
- State: Delaware
- County: Sussex
- City: Laurel; Bethel

Physical characteristics
- Source: confluence of Elliott Pond Branch and James Branch
  - location: Lake Pines, Delaware
  - coordinates: 38°33′31″N 075°34′03″W
  - elevation: 8 ft (2.4 m)
- Mouth: Nanticoke River
  - location: about 0.5 miles west of Cherry Walk, Delaware
  - coordinates: 38°34′05″N 075°40′29″W
  - elevation: 0 ft (0 m)
- Length: 8.00 mi (12.87 km)
- Basin size: 123.77 square miles (320.6 km^{2})
- Discharge
  - location: Nanticoke River
  - average: 146.81 cu ft/s (4.157 m^{3}/s) at mouth with Nanticoke River

Basin features
- Progression: Nanticoke River → Chesapeake Bay → Atlantic Ocean
- River system: Nanticoke River
- Tributaries
  - left: Copper Branch; Little Creek; Holly Ditch; Collins and Culver Ditch; Tussocky Branch
  - right: Rogers Branch
- Waterbodies: Records Pond
- Bridges: US 13, Willow Street, Delaware Avenue, North Central Avenue, North Poplar Street, Shell Bridge Road

Broad Creek is a 8.00 mi (12.87 km) long 4th order tributary to the Nanticoke River in Sussex County, Delaware.

== Variant names ==
According to the Geographic Names Information System, it has also been known historically as:

- Broad Creek River
- Laurel River

== Course ==
Broad Creek is formed at the confluence of Elliott Pond Branch and James Branch at Lake Pines, Delaware and then flows west into the Nanticoke River about 0.5 miles west of Cherry Walk.

== Watershed ==
Broad Creek drains 123.77 square miles (320.6 km^{2}) of area, receives about 45.0 in/year of precipitation, has a topographic wetness index of 718.86 and is about 14% forested.

== See also ==
- List of Delaware rivers
