= The Delaware Wave =

Newspaper published in Bethany Beach, Delaware

- Type: Weekly newspaper
- Format: Broadsheet
- Owner: Gannett
- Publisher: USA Today Network
- Founded: 1999
- Headquarters: Bethany Beach, Delaware, United States
- Website: delmarvanow.com

The Delaware Wave was a Gannett-owned English-language newspaper based in Bethany Beach, Delaware. Seventeen staff members publish the weekly 11-inch by 17-inch newspaper, every Tuesday, and distribute it to the public on Wednesdays. It serves from Bethany Beach and Fenwick Island to Georgetown and Selbyville with local news. Online, it is known as Delmarva Now. Founded in 1999, it is one of three Gannett newspapers in Delaware that together have a circulation of approximately 22,000 per week.

== Sections ==
- News
- Perspective (changed to Voices in March 2008)
- Health Matters (changed to Health in March 2008)
- Education
- Business
- Shorelife
- Our Neighbors
- Faith & Family (Eliminated in December 2008)
- Real Estate (Eliminated in December 2008)
- Sports
- Obituaries (changed to Area Deaths in March 2008)

== Towns in coverage area ==
- Bethany Beach, Delaware
- Clarksville, Delaware
- Dagsboro, Delaware
- Fenwick Island, Delaware
- Frankford, Delaware
- Georgetown, Delaware
- Millville, Delaware
- Millsboro, Delaware
- Ocean View, Delaware
- Omar, Delaware
- Roxana, Delaware
- Selbyville, Delaware
- South Bethany, Delaware

== Schools in coverage area ==
- Indian River School District
- Sussex Technical School District

== Affiliations ==
As part of the Delmarva Media Group, The Delaware Wave is one of many weekly newspapers that works in conjunction with The Daily Times in Salisbury, Maryland.

Other Delmarva Media Group publications include:

- The Delaware Coast Press
- The Chincoteague Beacon
- The Delaware-Maryland Beachcomber
- The Eastern Shore News
- The Ocean Pines Independent
- The Worcester County Times
- The Somerset Herald
- The Virginia Beachcomber
- Go! Magazine
- Shorewoman

The Delaware Wave was acquired by Gannett Media Company in 2000 and is now affiliated with the USA Today Network.

The other Gannett newspapers in Delaware are The Delaware Coast Press and Wilmington's The News Journal.
