= Delaware Route 20 =

State highway in Delaware, United States

Delaware Route 20

Route information
- Maintained by DelDOT
- Length: 40.29 mi (64.84 km)
- Existed: 1936–present
- Tourist routes: Nanticoke Heritage Byway

Major junctions
- West end: MD 392 in Reliance
- US 13 in Seaford; US 9 in Hardscrabble; US 113 in Millsboro; DE 24 in Millsboro; DE 26 in Dagsboro; DE 17 in Roxana
- East end: DE 54 near Fenwick Island

Location
- Country: United States
- State: Delaware
- Counties: Sussex

Highway system
- Delaware State Route System; List; Byways
← DE 18	→ DE 22

Delaware Route 20 (DE 20) is an east–west state highway in Sussex County, Delaware. Its western terminus is the Maryland state line in Reliance, where the road continues as Maryland Route 392 (MD 392). Its eastern terminus is DE 54 west of Fenwick Island. The route runs through rural areas of Sussex County and passes through the towns of Seaford, Millsboro, and Dagsboro. DE 20 intersects U.S. Route 13 (US 13) in Seaford, US 9 in Hardscrabble, US 113 and DE 24 in Millsboro, DE 26 in Dagsboro, and DE 17 in Roxana. DE 20 was originally created by 1936 to run from the Maryland border east to US 113 in Millsboro. By 1970, it was realigned to bypass Seaford. The route was extended east to DE 1 in Fenwick Island by 1994; however, the eastern terminus was cut back to DE 54 in 2005 to avoid the concurrency with that route.

== Route description ==
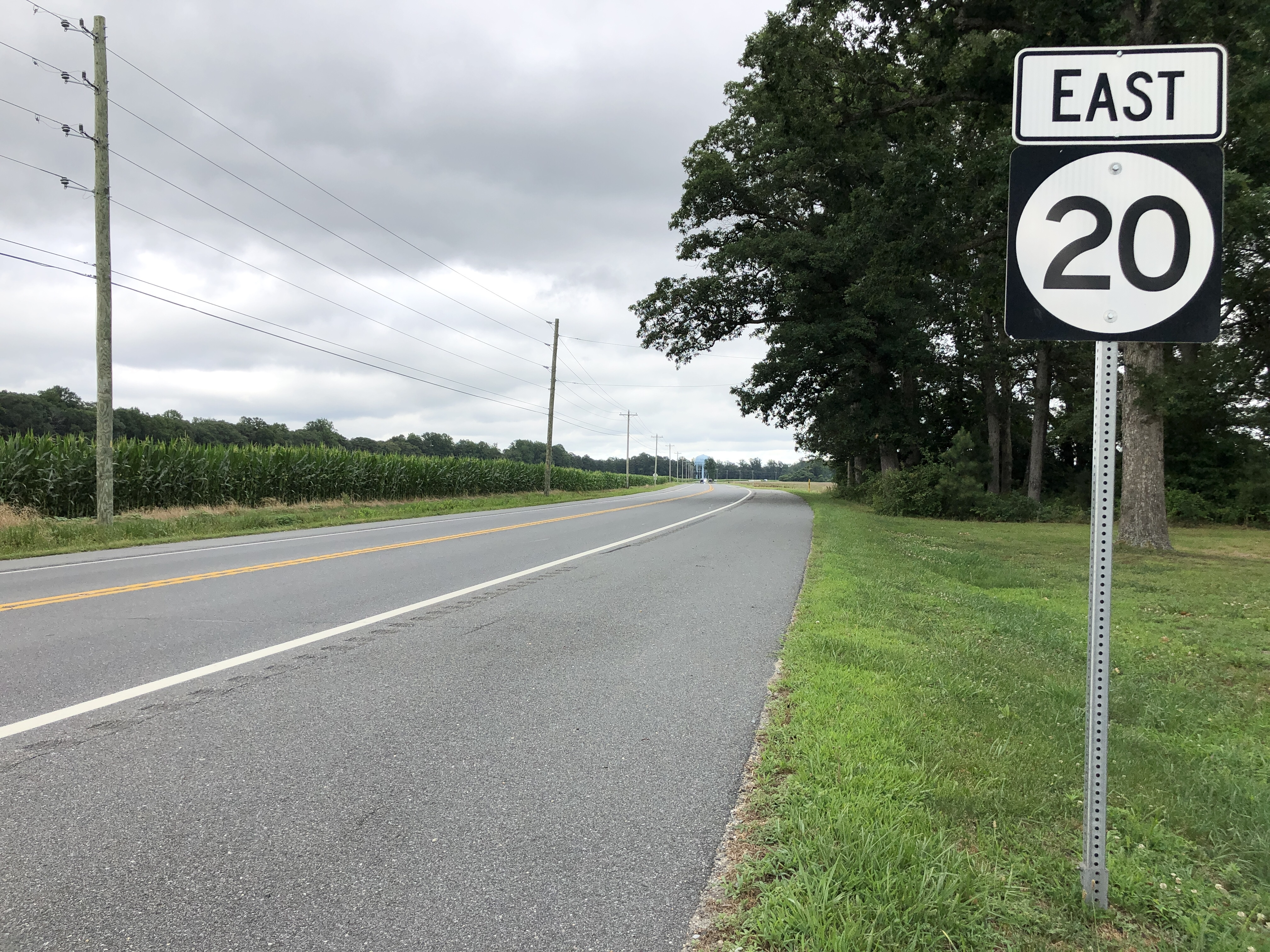
DE 20 eastbound west of Millsboro

DE 20 begins at the Maryland border in Reliance, where the road continues west into that state as MD 392. From the state line, the route heads east on two-lane undivided Stein Highway through farmland with some woods and homes. The road crosses the Delmarva Central Railroad's Cambridge Industrial Track line at-grade and Chapel Branch before it continues into the city of Seaford, where it heads into industrial areas. DE 20 widens into a five-lane road with a center left-turn lane and passes through residential and commercial areas of the city, intersecting Atlanta Road. The road becomes a four-lane divided highway and comes to a bridge over the Delmarva Central Railroad's Delmarva Subdivision line, turning back into a five-lane road. The route turns into a divided highway again as it intersects with Bridgeville Highway/Front Street. Past this intersection, DE 20 becomes Norman A. Eskridge Highway and bends northeast, reaching an intersection with US 13.

At this point, DE 20 turns south for a concurrency with US 13 on the four-lane divided Sussex Highway. The road crosses Williams Pond along Clear Brook before passing through commercial areas and coming to a bridge over the Nanticoke River. Near the town of Blades, DE 20 splits from US 13 by turning east on two-lane undivided Concord Road. The road passes through wooded residential neighborhoods, reaching the community of Concord. The route continues southeast through a mix of farmland and woodland with some homes, curving to the east. DE 20 reaches the community of Hardscrabble and intersects US 9, at which point it is briefly a divided highway. Past this intersection, the name changes to Hardscrabble Road and the road becomes undivided again, crossing Asketum Branch. The road heads southeast before it makes a turn to the east. The route comes to an intersection with US 113 northwest of the town of Millsboro.

DE 20 turns southeast to form a concurrency with US 113 on four-lane divided Dupont Boulevard, entering Millsboro. The road passes through commercial areas, intersecting DE 24. The two routes run past more businesses and a few homes, crossing Iron Branch before leaving Millsboro. DE 20 splits from US 113 by turning southeast on two-lane undivided Dagsboro Road. The road crosses Whartons Branch and continues through wooded areas with some homes before heading into farmland and crossing the Delmarva Central Railroad's Indian River Subdivision line at-grade. The route enters the town of Dagsboro and becomes Main Street, passing homes and a few businesses. DE 20 comes to an intersection with DE 26, at which point that route becomes concurrent with DE 20. The two routes cross Pepper Creek, curving east and leaving town on Vines Creek Road.

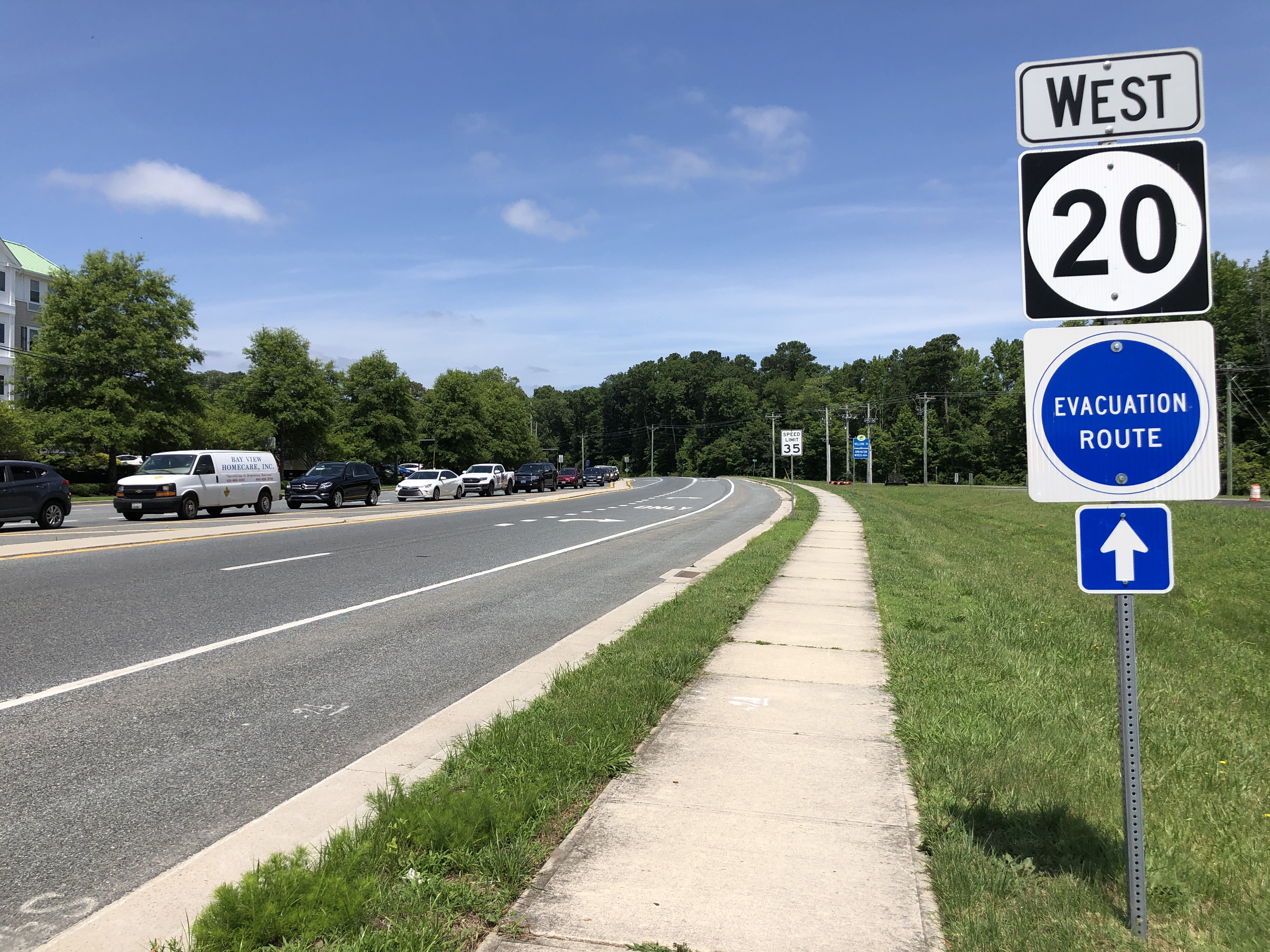
DE 20 westbound past eastern terminus at DE 54 west of Fenwick Island

Upon leaving Dagsboro, the road passes to the south of Prince George's Chapel and DE 20 splits from DE 26 by heading southeast on Armory Road. The road heads to the north of Indian River High School and runs through agricultural areas with some woods and homes. In Omar, the route crosses Omar Road and becomes Pyle Center Road. DE 20 continues to an intersection with DE 17 in Roxana. Following this intersection, the route becomes Zion Church Road and runs through more rural land, crossing DE 54 Alt. and Dirickson Creek. Farther southeast, residential development near the road increases and it widens to four lanes. DE 20 comes to its eastern terminus at an intersection with DE 54 west of the town of Fenwick Island.

The section of DE 20 east of DE 26 serves as part of a primary hurricane evacuation route from the Fenwick Island area to points inland while the section of DE 20 between US 13 and US 113 serves as part of a secondary hurricane evacuation route from the coastal areas. The portion of the route between US 13 in Blades and Fire Tower Road is designated as part of the Nanticoke Heritage Byway, a Delaware Byway. DE 20 has an annual average daily traffic count ranging from a high of 37,522 vehicles at the Middleford Road intersection along the US 13 concurrency in Seaford to a low of 5,240 vehicles at the Shiloh Church Road intersection between Hardscrabble and Millsboro. The portions of DE 20 concurrent with US 13 and US 113 are part of the National Highway System.

== History ==
What would become DE 20 was originally an unimproved county road in 1920, with the portion between Seaford and Concord under contract as a state highway. By 1924, the road was completed as a state highway from the Maryland border east to Concord. The portion of road between Concord and Hardscrabble was proposed as a state highway a year later. By 1931, the state highway was extended from Concord to Hardscrabble. A portion of what would become DE 20 west of Millsboro was built as a state road the following year.

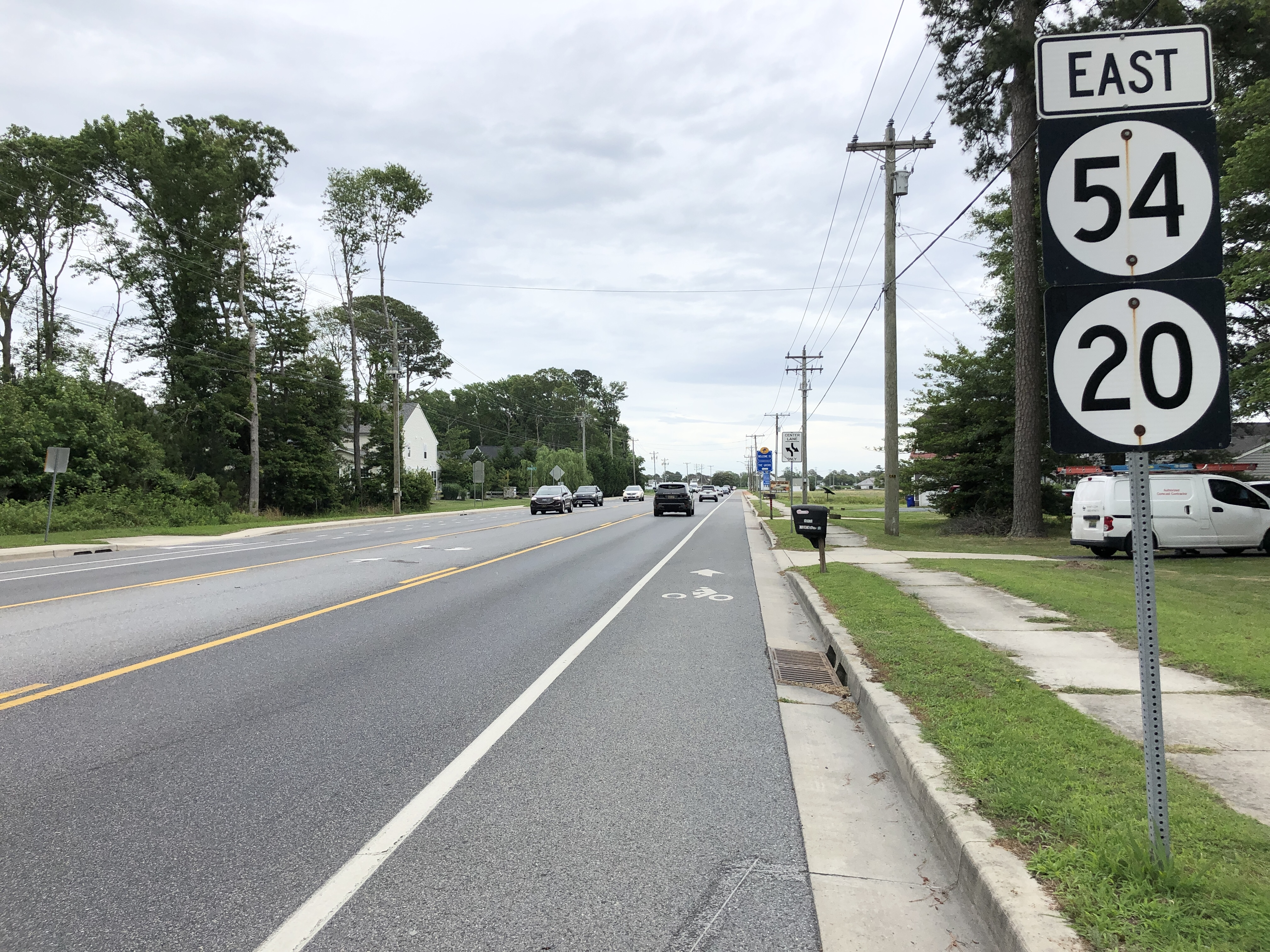
DE 20 signed along its former concurrency with DE 54 into Fenwick Island in 2022

DE 20 was designated to run from the Maryland border in Reliance east to US 113 in Millsboro by 1936, following its current alignment to Seaford before heading south along what was then US 13 (Front Street) to Blades, where it turned east onto High Street and picked up its current alignment to Millsboro. In 1939, plans were made to eliminate the grade crossing with the Pennsylvania Railroad (now the Delmarva Central Railroad's Delmarva Subdivision) in Seaford by replacing it with a bridge over the tracks. Construction on this bridge began a year later. On September 2, 1941, the DE 20 bridge over the railroad tracks in Seaford opened to traffic.

By 1970, the Norman Eskridge Highway was built between Front Street and US 13 in Seaford, and DE 20 was moved to its current alignment bypassing Seaford and Blades to the north and northeast along the Norman Eskridge Highway and US 13. In 1985, the highway was widened into a four-lane road through Seaford, with a parallel bridge built over Conrail's Delmarva Secondary (now the Delmarva Central Railroad's Delmarva Subdivision). The route was extended east to DE 1 in Fenwick Island by 1994, following its current alignment between Millsboro and DE 54 before overlapping with DE 54 (Lighthouse Road) for the easternmost portion of the route. In 2005, DE 20 was removed from the DE 54 concurrency after it was determined unnecessary for there to be two route numbers for that stretch of road. Despite this, some DE 20 shields are posted along DE 54 between the eastern terminus and Fenwick Island.

== Major intersections ==
The entire route is in Sussex County.

Location	mi	km	Destinations	Notes
Reliance	0.00	0.00	MD 392 west (Finchville Reliance Road) – Hurlock, Cambridge	Maryland state line; western terminus
Seaford	6.34	10.20	US 13 north (Sussex Highway) – Dover, Wilmington	West end of US 13 overlap
Blades	7.18	11.56	US 13 south (Sussex Highway) – Laurel	East end of US 13 overlap
Hardscrabble	13.69	22.03	US 9 (County Seat Highway) – Georgetown, Laurel	
Millsboro	23.46	37.76	US 113 north (Dupont Boulevard) – Georgetown	West end of US 113 overlap
Millsboro	25.32	40.75	DE 24 (Laurel Road/South Washington Street) – Millsboro, Rehoboth Beach, Oak Orchard, Laurel, Gumboro	
Millsboro	26.91	43.31	US 113 south (Dupont Boulevard) – Selbyville	East end of US 113 overlap
Dagsboro	29.37	47.27	DE 26 west (Clayton Street) to US 113 south – Laurel	West end of DE 26 overlap
Dagsboro	29.90	48.12	DE 26 east (Vines Creek Road) – Bethany Beach	East end of DE 26 overlap
Roxana			DE 17 (Roxana Road)	
	38.79	62.43	DE 54 Alt. (Johnson Road/Bayard Road)	
Fenwick Island	40.29	64.84	DE 54 (Lighthouse Road) – Fenwick Island, Selbyville	Eastern terminus
1.000 mi = 1.609 km; 1.000 km = 0.621 mi: Concurrency terminus
