= Route 54 (Maryland–Delaware) =

Highway in Delaware and Maryland in the United States

Route 54
- Route 54 highlighted in red; DE 54 Alt. in blue

Route information
- Maintained by MDSHA and DelDOT
- Length: 41.84 mi (67.33 km): MD 54: 19.79 mi (31.85 km); DE 54: 38.59 mi (62.10 km) (Note: Both state figures include a 16.54 mi (26.62 km) overlap between the first and last crossings of the state line.)
- Existed: 1969–present
- Tourist routes: Chesapeake Country Scenic Byway

Major junctions
- West end: MD 313 in Mardela Springs, MD
- MD 675 in Delmar, MD; US 13 in Delmar, DE; DE 26 / MD 353 near Gumboro, DE; US 113 in Selbyville, DE; DE 17 in Selbyville, DE; DE 20 near Fenwick Island, DE
- East end: DE 1 in Fenwick Island, DE

Location
- Country: United States
- State: Maryland
- Counties: MD: Wicomico; DE: Sussex

Highway system
- Maryland highway system; Interstate; US; State; Scenic Byways
- Delaware State Route System; List; Byways
← DE 52	DE 54	→ DE 58
← MD 53	MD 54	→ MD 55
← DE 30	DE 32	→ DE 34

Maryland Route 54 (MD 54) and Delaware Route 54 (DE 54) are adjoining state highways in the U.S. states of Maryland and Delaware. Route 54 runs 41.84 mi (67.33 km) from MD 313 in Mardela Springs, Maryland, east to DE 1 in Fenwick Island, Delaware. In addition to two segments in which the highway is completely in Delaware and two segments in which the highway is completely in Maryland, Route 54 follows the Delaware/Maryland state line between the twin towns of Delmar, Maryland, and Delmar, Delaware, and the highway's intersection with MD 353 and DE 26. One section of the state line portion of Route 54 is maintained by the Delaware Department of Transportation (DelDOT) while three sections of the highway that follow the state line are maintained by the Maryland State Highway Administration (MDSHA).

Route 54 was first numbered in two segments in Wicomico County, Maryland, in the late 1930s. MD 467 was assigned to the segment around Mardela Springs while MD 455 was assigned to the state line road near Delmar. The Delaware portions of the highway remained unnumbered until the late 1960s, when DelDOT briefly assigned DE 32 to the highway along the southern edge of Sussex County before designating it DE 54. The Maryland State Roads Commission (now MDSHA) immediately reciprocated by designating its portions MD 54. Route 54 east of Selbyville has become an important route for seasonal beach traffic headed to and from Fenwick Island and Ocean City, with suburban development lining the road between DE 20 and the eastern terminus. DelDOT has signed DE 54 Alternate (DE 54 Alt.) as an alternate route to the beaches. Improvements have been made to the route west of Fenwick Island, including building a causeway to reduce flooding and adding a center left-turn lane.

== Route description ==
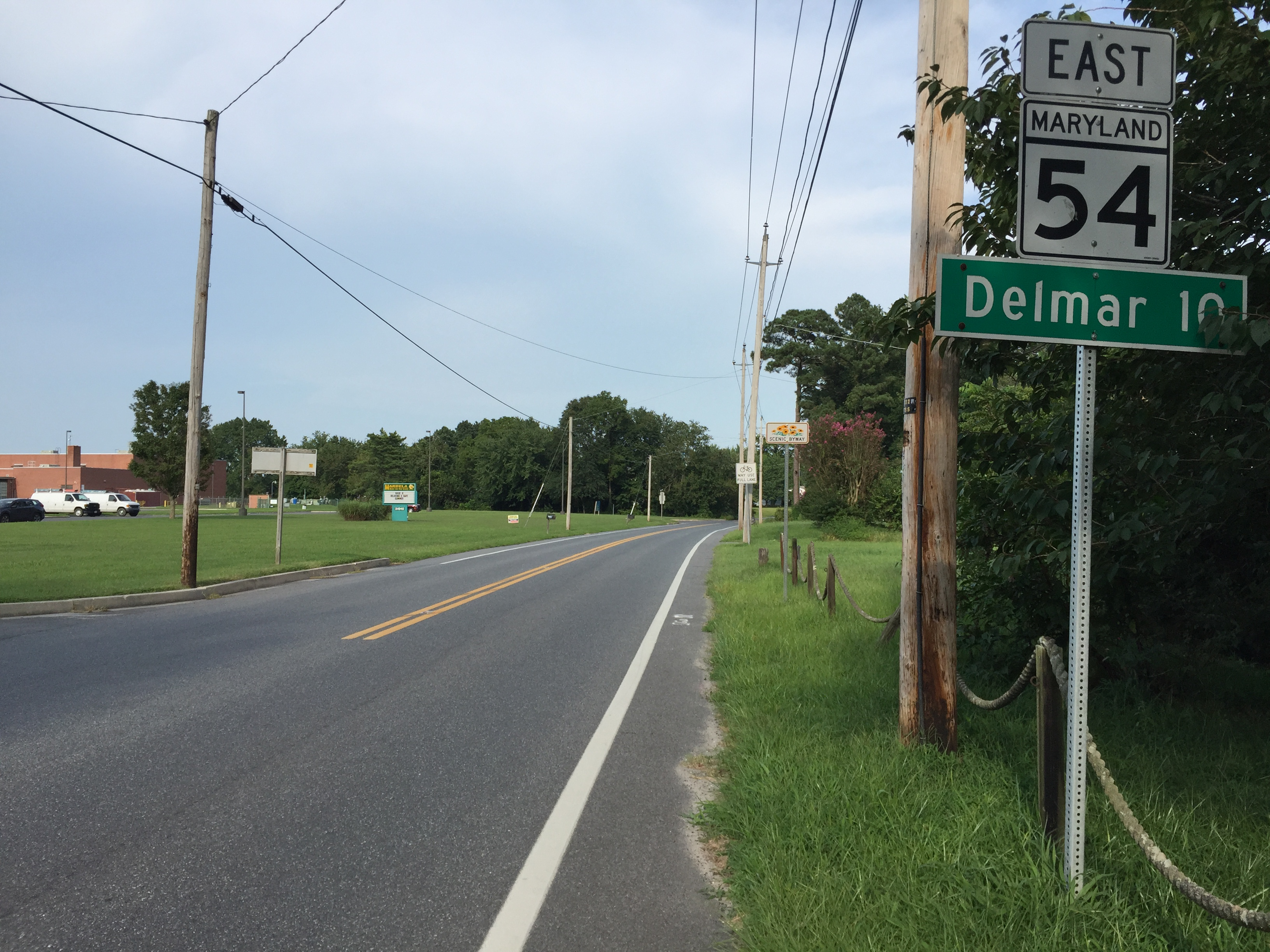
View east at the west end of Route 54 at MD 313 in Mardela Springs, Maryland

Route 54 begins at an intersection with MD 313 in the town of Mardela Springs in Wicomico County, Maryland. MD 313 heads north from the intersection as Sharptown Road and west as a short continuation of Delmar Road west to MD 313's terminus with U.S. Route 50 (US 50, Ocean Gateway). Route 54 heads east as two-lane undivided Delmar Road, passing south of Mardela Middle and High School. The road parallels Barren Creek on the north toward the Delaware state line, crossing Mockingbird Creek. After passing the stone marker indicating the intersection of the Transpeninsular Line with the southern end of the Mason–Dixon line, the highway enters the southwest corner of Sussex County, Delaware, where it intersects Columbia Road at Packing House Corner. Route 54 continues east until Old Racetrack Road, where the highway turns southeast toward the state line. At the intersection with Waller Road, the state highway begins to follow the state line, with Sussex County, Delaware on the north side of the road and Wicomico County, Maryland on the south, and MDSHA maintenance begins. Route 54 immediately enters the twin towns of Delmar, Delaware, and Delmar, Maryland, and the highway's name changes to West State Street. The highway crosses the Delmarva Central Railroad's Delmarva Subdivision track at-grade south of Highball Signal, where the name changes to East State Street, and meets MD 675 (Bi-State Boulevard), the old alignment of US 13, in the center of the towns. Route 54 continues east and becomes West Line Road before it intersects US 13, which is known as Sussex Highway in Delaware and Ocean Highway in Maryland. At US 13, the highway leaves Delmar and DelDOT assumes maintenance for the highway.

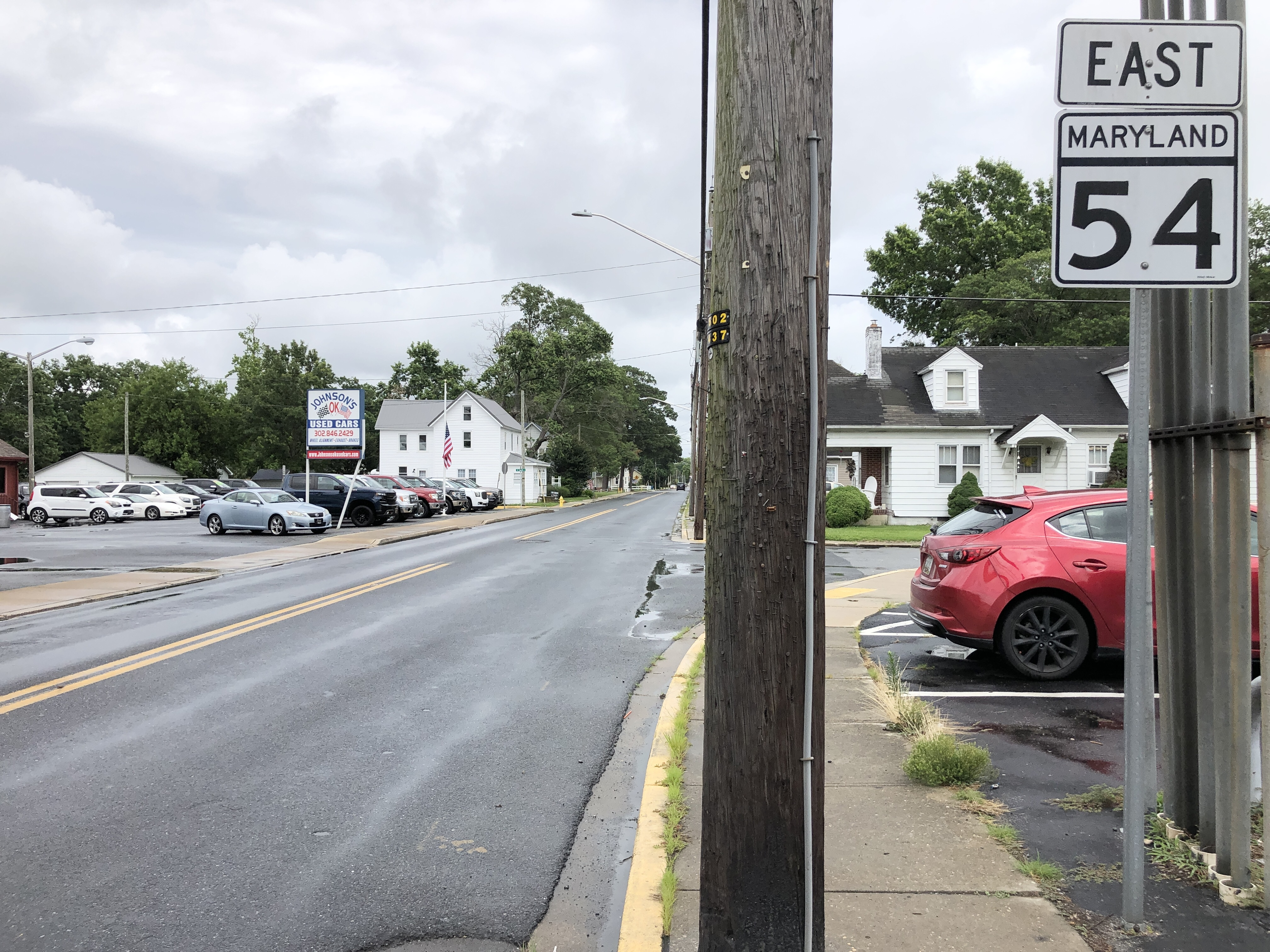
Route 54 eastbound past MD 675/Bi-State Boulevard in Delmar. Delaware is on the left side of the road and Maryland is on the right side of the road.

Route 54 continues east from US 13 as East Line Road through farmland and scattered residences along the state line. At Brittingham Road, maintenance jurisdiction returns to MDSHA. Around the intersection with Whitesville Road, Route 54 dips into Maryland for a short distance, then returns to following the state line until the intersection with MD 353 (Gumboro Road) and DE 26 (Millsboro Highway). At that intersection, Route 54 turns northeast and joins DE 26 in a concurrency. From this point, the highway remains in Delaware. A short distance north of the state line, the road intersects Whitesville Road. In Gumboro, DE 26 continues north while Route 54 turns east onto Cypress Road. Route 54 crosses Bald Cypress Branch and the Pocomoke River, then passes through the Great Cypress Swamp. After crossing the swamp, the highway intersects US 113 (Dupont Boulevard) on the west edge of the town of Selbyville.

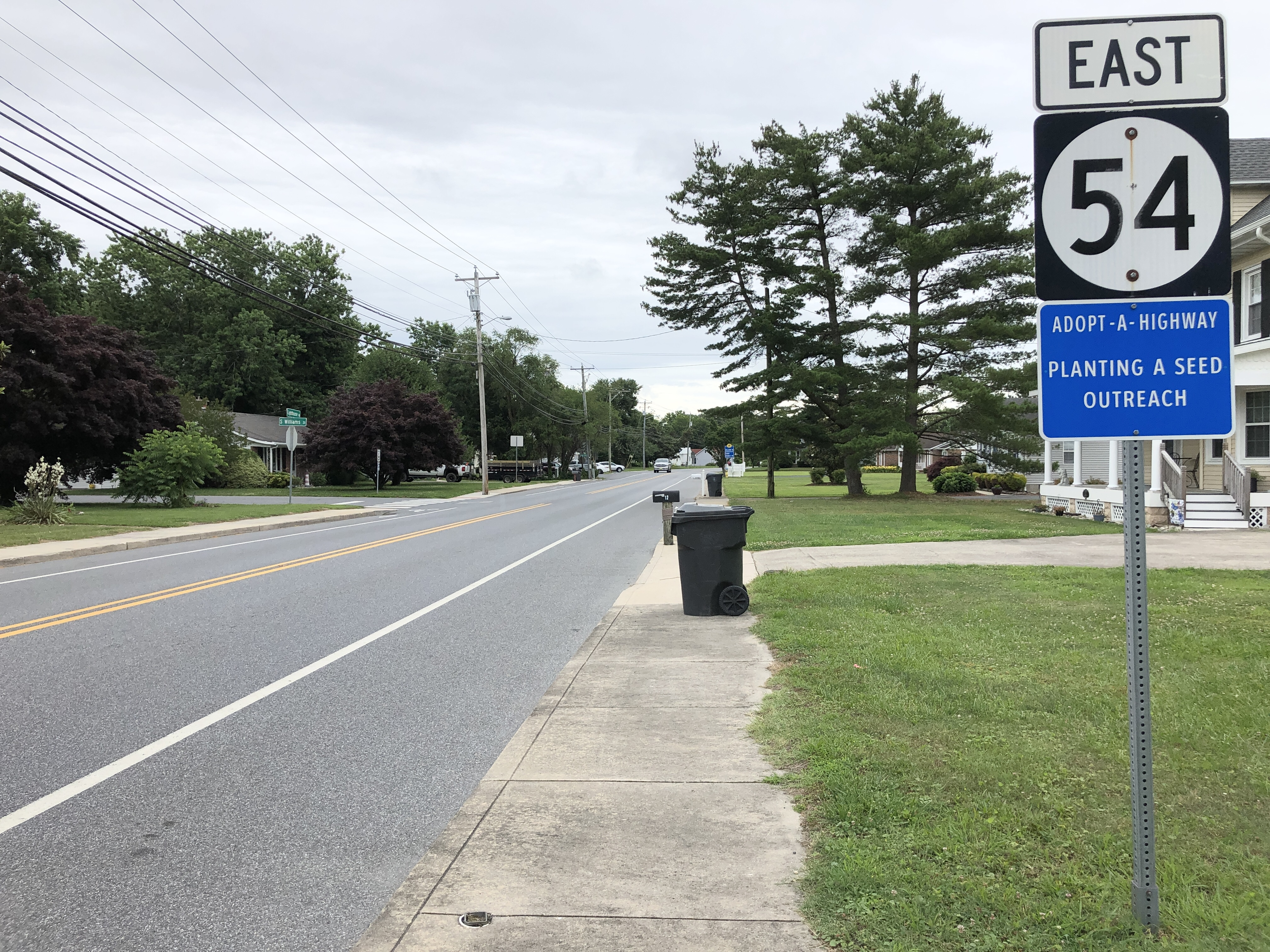
Route 54 eastbound in Selbyville, Delaware

Route 54 continues east into Selbyville as Cemetery Road and crosses the Snow Hill Line of the Maryland and Delaware Railroad at-grade. The highway turns south into Main Street to pass through the central business district. After intersecting the southern terminus of DE 17 (Bethany Road), Route 54 turns east onto Lighthouse Road. In the hamlet of Bunting, the highway intersects DE 54 Alt. (Bunting Road), an alternate route from Selbyville to the town of Bethany Beach. Route 54 passes through Williamsville and begins to pass beach-related suburban development as the highway crosses Drum Creek and Roy Creek before intersecting the east end of DE 20 (Zion Church Road). Past this intersection, the route gains a center left-turn lane and continues past more development. As the highway approaches the town of Fenwick Island, it becomes two lanes again and crosses two tidal ponds on an elevated causeway before it crosses The Ditch between Assawoman Bay to the south and Little Assawoman Bay to the north. After passing to the north of the Fenwick Island Light, Route 54 reaches its eastern terminus at DE 1 (Coastal Highway) in Fenwick Island, one block west of the Atlantic Ocean and one block north of the town of Ocean City on the other side of the state line.

The section of Route 54 east of US 113 in Selbyville serves as a main route to Fenwick Island and sees congestion in the summer months. Route 54 east of US 113 also serves as part of a primary hurricane evacuation route from the Fenwick Island area to points inland while the section of Route 54 between US 13 and US 113 serves as part of a secondary hurricane evacuation route from the coastal areas. Route 54 has an annual average daily traffic count ranging from a high of 15,984 vehicles at the Old Stage Road intersection in Delmar to a low of 812 vehicles at the Cemetery Road intersection west of Selbyville.

== History ==
Delaware Route 32
- Location: West of Delmar–Fenwick Island
- Existed: 1968–1969

Maryland Route 455
- Location: Delmar
- Existed: 1939–1969

Maryland Route 467
- Location: Mardela Springs
- Existed: 1939–1969

By 1920, what is now Route 54 in Delaware existed as an unpaved county road. The portion of the current route along Millsboro Highway was proposed as a state highway by 1925. This segment of state highway was completed by 1931, along with the portions from south of Columbia to a point along the state line to the east of Delmar and between Selbyville and Williamsville. A portion of the route along the state line east of Delmar was paved as a county road. On July 1, 1935, the county-maintained portions of the road in Delaware were taken over by the state. By 1936, the roadway was paved between Williamsville and Fenwick Island. A portion of road to the west of Selbyville was paved by 1939. By 1942, the remainder of the road in Delaware between the Maryland border and south of Columbia and Gumboro and Selbyville were paved.

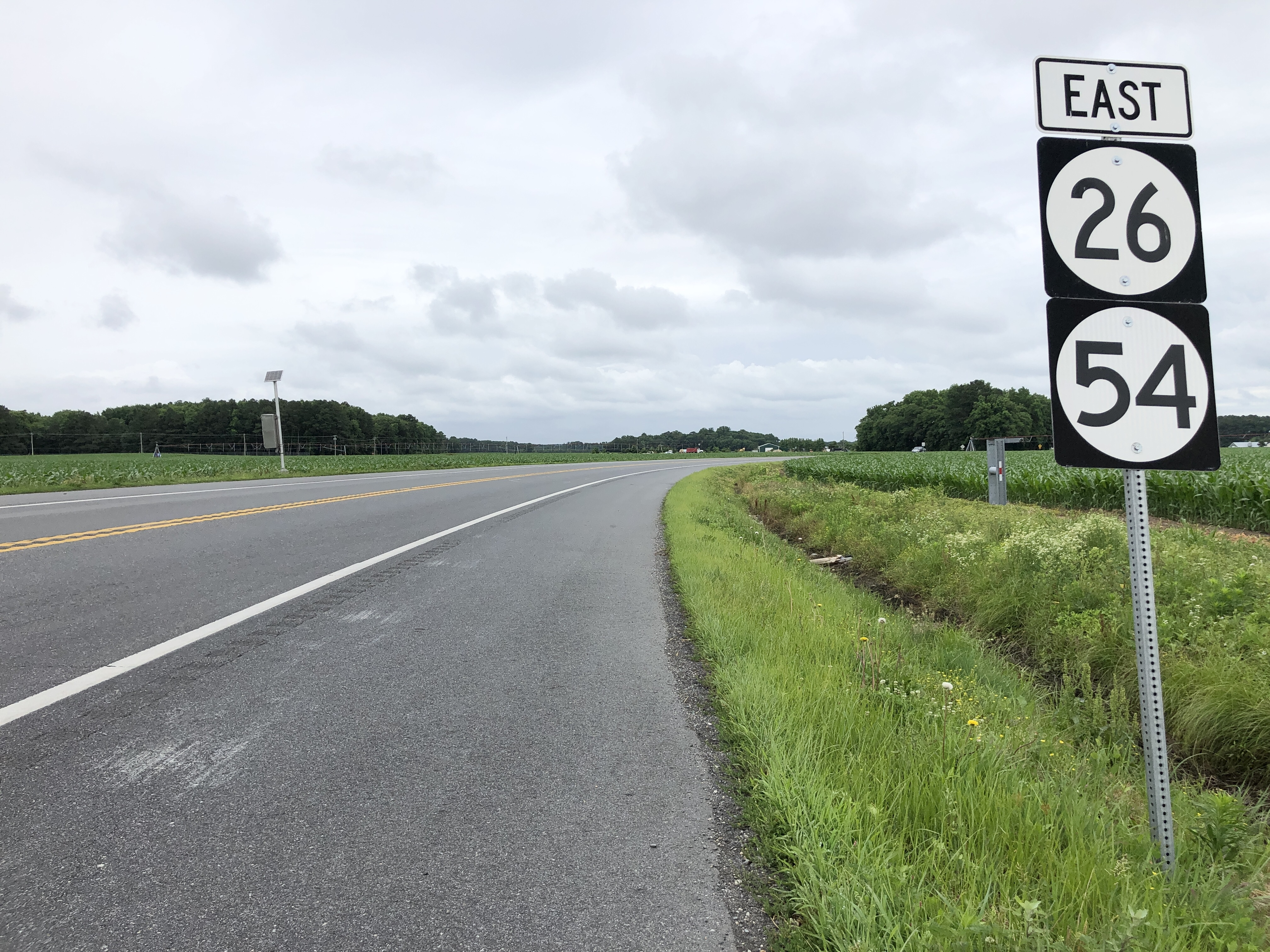
Route 54 eastbound concurrent with DE 26 eastbound past the Maryland border near Gumboro, Delaware

The first non-concurrent portions of Route 54 to be numbered were in Maryland in 1939, when MD 467 was marked on the portion around Mardela Springs and MD 455 was marked on the portion around Delmar, which extended from where Waller Road fully enters Maryland east to Brittingham Road. The portion of road between Brittingham Road and MD 353 was county-maintained. MD 455 was extended east from Brittingham Road to DE 26/MD 353 in 1958. In 1968, DE 32 was assigned to the entire highway within Delaware; the Maryland sections were still marked as MD 467 and MD 455. The whole highway was marked as Route 54 in 1969. In addition to the concurrency with DE 26, Route 54 has been concurrent with DE 20 and DE 30. DE 20 was extended east of Dagsboro to terminate in Fenwick Island along with Route 54 by 1994. DE 20's eastern terminus was rolled back to its present location in 2005. Despite this, some DE 20 shields are posted along Route 54 between that route's eastern terminus and Fenwick Island. DE 30 was designated concurrent with Route 54 along Millsboro Highway north of Whitesville Road in 1994. The DE 30 designation was removed from this section of road in 2022.

In September 2001, construction began to build an elevated causeway for Route 54 to the west of Fenwick Island in order to prevent flooding from high tides and storms. The project involved building the new causeway to the north of the original alignment, using pre-cast concrete segments. The project, which cost over $15 million, was slated to be finished in August 2003. In 2010, a $10 million project began to add a center left-turn lane along with bike lanes and sidewalks to the portion of Route 54 between DE 20 and Mallard Lakes, a section of road that was targeted for safety improvements due to rapid development; this project was completed in 2012.

== Major intersections ==
DE 54 officially has a length of 38.59 mi (62.10 km) and MD 54 officially has a length of 19.79 mi (31.85 km). Both of these figures include a 16.54 mi (26.62 km) overlap between the first and last crossings of the state line.

State	County	Location	mi	km	Destinations	Notes
Maryland	Wicomico	Mardela Springs	0.00	0.00	MD 313 (Delmar Road/Sharptown Road) to US 50 (Ocean Gateway) – Sharptown, Federalsburg	Western terminus of MD 54; MD 313 continues west on Delmar Road to US 50
Maryland–Delaware state line			3.25	5.23	Western terminus of DE 54	
Delaware	Sussex	Packing House Corner	4.47	7.19	Columbia Road north	
Maryland– Delaware	Wicomico– Sussex	Delmar, MD – Delmar, DE	9.51	15.30	Waller Road west – Hebron	Route 54 begins to follow state line; begin MDSHA maintenance
Maryland– Delaware	Wicomico– Sussex	Delmar, MD – Delmar, DE	9.97	16.05	MD 675 south (Bi-State Boulevard) / Bi-State Boulevard north	Old alignment of US 13; northern terminus of MD 675
Maryland– Delaware	Wicomico– Sussex	Delmar, MD – Delmar, DE	10.84	17.45	US 13 (Sussex Highway/Ocean Highway) – Laurel, Salisbury	End MDSHA maintenance; begin DelDOT maintenance
Maryland– Delaware	Wicomico– Sussex		15.01	24.16	Brittingham Road north	End DelDOT maintenance; begin MDSHA maintenance
Maryland–Delaware state line			17.97	28.92	Route 54 fully enters Maryland	
Maryland	Wicomico		18.43	29.66	Whitesville Road north	
Maryland–Delaware state line			18.87	30.37	Route 54 begins to follow state line	
Maryland– Delaware	Wicomico– Sussex		19.79	31.85	DE 26 begins (Millsboro Highway) MD 353 south (Gumboro Road) / Bethel Road east	Route 54 turns north onto Millsboro Highway to fully enter Delaware; eastern terminus of MD 54; western terminus of DE 26; northern terminus of MD 353; west end of concurrency with DE 26
Delaware	Sussex	Gumboro	22.16	35.66	DE 26 east (Millsboro Highway)	Route 54 turns east onto Cypress Road; east end of concurrency with DE 26
Delaware	Sussex	Selbyville	30.55	49.17	US 113 (Dupont Boulevard) – Frankford, Dagsboro, Berlin	
Delaware	Sussex	Selbyville	31.06	49.99	Main Street north – Frankford	Route 54 turns south onto Main Street
Delaware	Sussex	Selbyville	31.42	50.57	Church Street	Church Street west is old alignment of DE 17
Delaware	Sussex	Selbyville	31.60	50.86	DE 17 north (Bethany Road) – Roxana	Southern terminus of DE 17
Delaware	Sussex	Selbyville	31.70	51.02	Hotel Road south	Route 54 turns east onto Lighthouse Road
Delaware	Sussex	Bunting			DE 54 Alt. east (Johnson Road)	Western terminus of DE 54 Alt.
Delaware	Sussex		37.88	60.96	DE 20 west (Zion Church Road)	Eastern terminus of DE 20
Delaware	Sussex	Fenwick Island	41.84	67.33	DE 1 (Coastal Highway)	Eastern terminus of DE 54
1.000 mi = 1.609 km; 1.000 km = 0.621 mi: Concurrency terminus

== Delaware Route 54 Alternate ==
Delaware Route 54 Alternate
- Location: Bunting–Bethany Beach
- Length: 8.99 mi (14.47 km)
- Existed: 2006–present

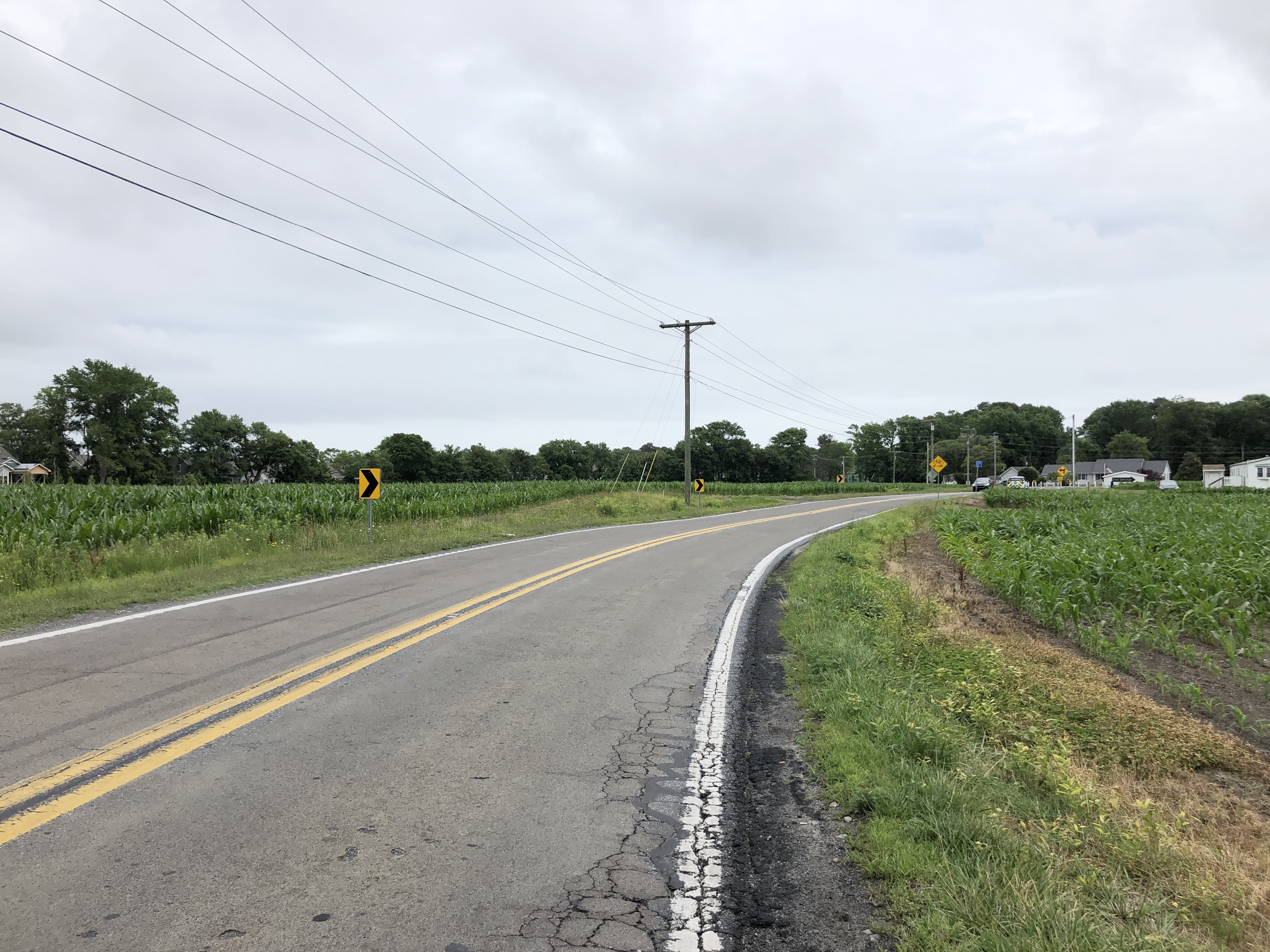
DE 54 Alt. eastbound in Bayard

Delaware Route 54 Alternate (DE 54 Alt.) is an unsigned alternate route of DE 54 between Bunting and DE 26 in the town of Bethany Beach. The alternate route heads northeast from DE 54 on two-lane undivided Johnson Road, passing through a mix of farmland and woodland and crossing Dirickson Creek. Upon crossing DE 20, DE 54 Alt. continues north along Bayard Road through more rural areas, crossing Bearhole Ditch and passing through the community of Bayard. The route turns east onto Double Bridges Road and continues northeast through forested areas along with a few residential subdivisions, passing north of the Assawoman Wildlife Area. DE 54 Alt. turns east onto Kent Avenue and crosses the Assawoman Canal, where it curves north and passes residential development before ending at DE 26 at Bethany Beach. DE 54 Alt. was designated by 2006.

Major intersections
The entire route is in Sussex County.

Location	mi	km	Destinations	Notes
Bunting	0.00	0.00	DE 54 (Lighthouse Road)	Western terminus
	1.35	2.17	DE 20 (Zion Church Road)	
Bethany Beach	8.99	14.47	DE 26 (Garfield Parkway)	Eastern terminus
1.000 mi = 1.609 km; 1.000 km = 0.621 mi
