= Delaware Route 26 =

State highway in Sussex County, Delaware, United States

Delaware Route 26

Route information
- Maintained by DelDOT
- Length: 22.96 mi (36.95 km)
- Existed: 1936–present

Major junctions
- West end: Route 54 / MD 353 near Gumboro
- DE 54 in Gumboro; US 113 in Dagsboro; DE 20 in Dagsboro; DE 17 near Millville; DE 1 in Bethany Beach
- East end: Dead end on Atlantic Ocean in Bethany Beach

Location
- Country: United States
- State: Delaware
- Counties: Sussex

Highway system
- Delaware State Route System; List; Byways
← DE 24	→ DE 28

Delaware Route 26 (DE 26) is a state highway in Sussex County, Delaware. The route's western terminus is at an intersection with Maryland Route 353 (MD 353) and DE/MD 54 at the Maryland border south of Gumboro and its eastern terminus is at a dead end on the Atlantic Ocean in Bethany Beach, even though signage ends at the DE 1 intersection. The route passes through rural areas of southeastern Sussex County along with the communities of Dagsboro, Millville, Ocean View and Bethany Beach. DE 26 intersects DE 54 in the Gumboro area, U.S. Route 113 (US 113) and DE 20 in Dagsboro, and DE 17 west of Millville. The road was built as a state highway in various stages during the 1920s and 1930s. By 1936, DE 26 was assigned onto its current alignment.

== Route description ==
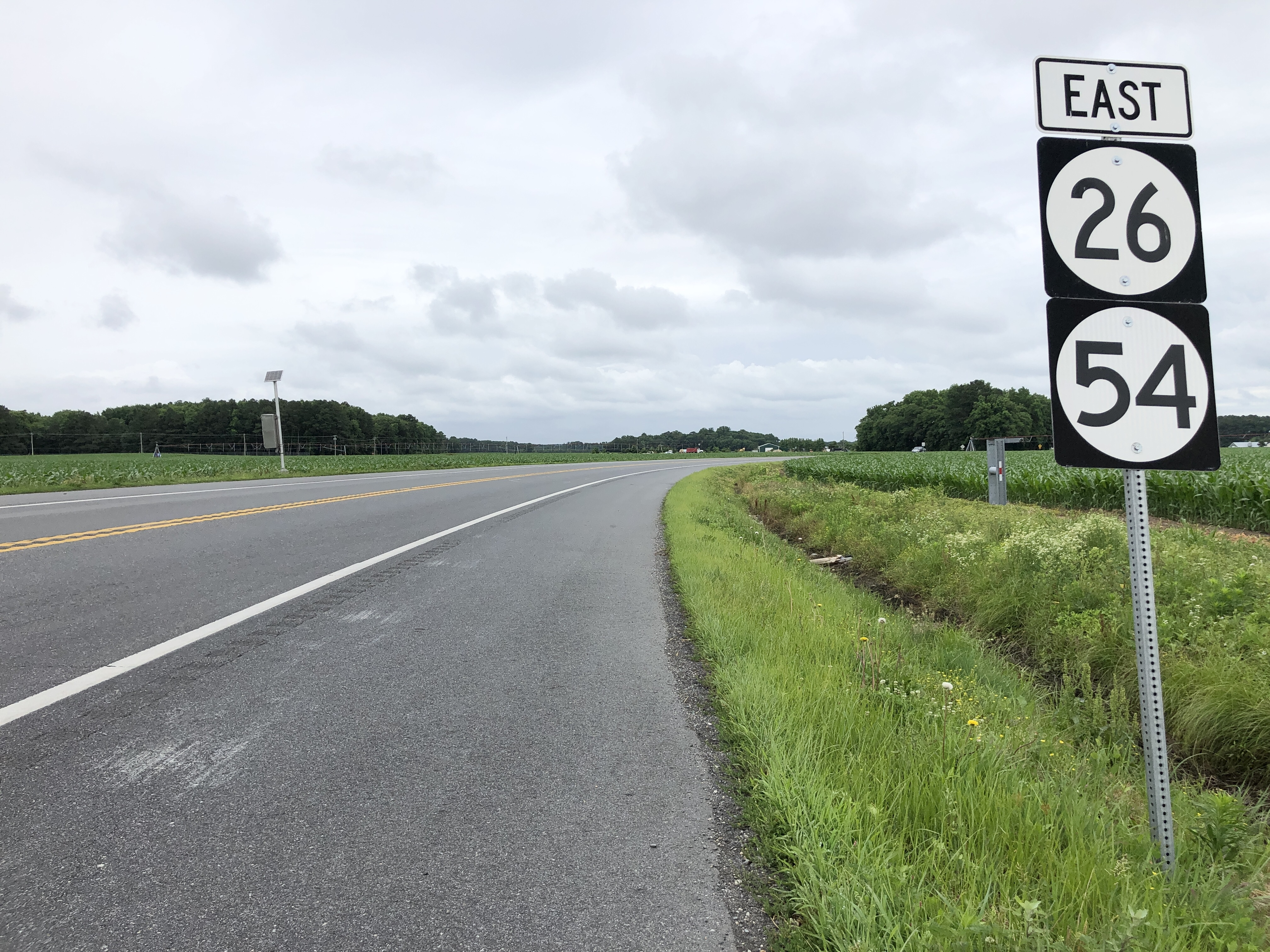
DE 26/DE 54 eastbound past the Maryland border near Gumboro

DE 26 begins at the Maryland border at an intersection where DE/MD 54 runs west along the state line and MD 353 continues south into Maryland. From the state line, DE 26 heads northeast on two-lane undivided Millsboro Highway concurrent with DE 54. The two routes pass through agricultural areas with some woods and homes, intersecting Whitesville Road. The road curves north and heads into the residential community of Gumboro, where DE 54 turns to the east. DE 26 leaves Gumboro and continues back into areas of farms and forests with occasional residences.

In Shaft Ox Corner, DE 26 splits from Millsboro Highway by turning east onto Nine Foot Road. The route continues east through rural land, crossing Whartons Branch twice and Pepper Creek before reaching an intersection with US 113. Past this intersection, the road becomes Clayton Street and enters the town of Dagsboro, passing homes and businesses and crossing the Delmarva Central Railroad's Indian River Subdivision line at-grade. In the center of Dagsboro, DE 26 comes to an intersection with DE 20, at which point it turns south to form a concurrency with DE 20 on Main Street. The two routes cross Pepper Creek, curving east and leaving town on Vines Creek Road.

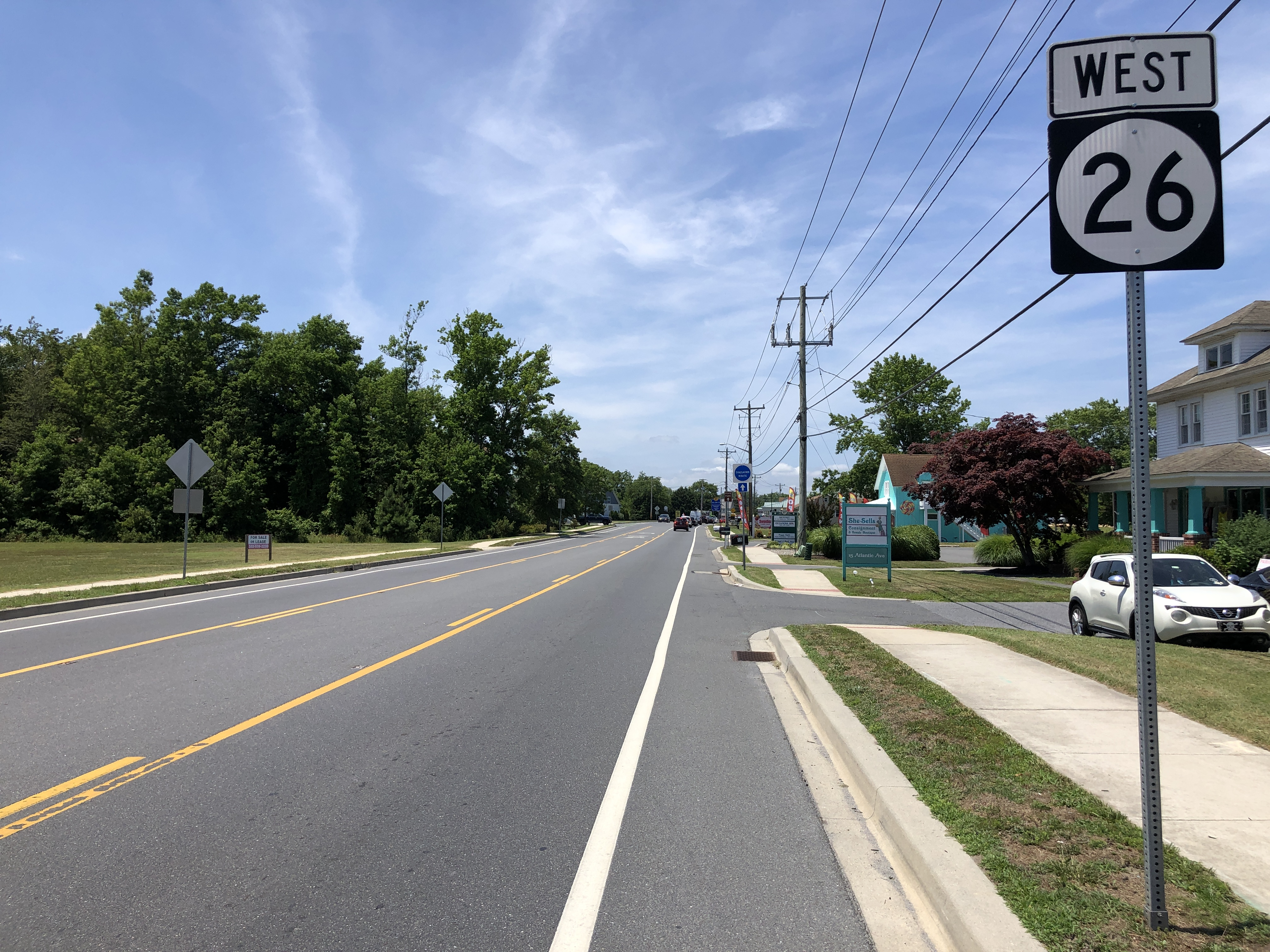
DE 26 westbound in Ocean View

Upon leaving Dagsboro, the road passes to the south of Prince George's Chapel and DE 20 splits from DE 26 by heading southeast on Armory Road. DE 26 continues east on Vines Creek Road, passing through a mix of farmland and woodland with some residential and commercial development and crossing Vines Creek. The route turns southeast and comes to the community of Clarksville, where it intersects Omar Road and curves east to become Atlantic Avenue, a three-lane road with a center left-turn lane. Farther along, the road comes to an intersection with the northern terminus of DE 17. After the DE 17 junction, DE 26 enters the town of Millville and runs through residential and commercial areas. The road continues east through the town of Ocean View before it crosses the Assawoman Canal into the town of Bethany Beach and becomes Garfield Parkway, passing move development and heading south of the Bethany Beach Nature Center. The road intersects the eastern terminus of DE 54 Alt. before coming to a junction with DE 1, at which point DE 26 signage ends. DE 26 officially continues east on four-lane divided Garfield Parkway through the commercial center of Bethany Beach, ending at a dead end at the Bethany Beach Boardwalk on the Atlantic Ocean.

The section of DE 26 east of US 113 in Dagsboro serves as a main route to Bethany Beach and sees congestion in the summer months. DE 26 east of US 113 also serves as part of a primary hurricane evacuation route from the Bethany Beach area to points inland while the sections of the route concurrent with DE 54 and between Millsboro Highway and US 113 serve as part of a secondary hurricane evacuation route from the coastal areas. DE 26 has an annual average daily traffic count ranging from a high of 23,217 vehicles at the western border of Millville in Ocean View to a low of 3,013 vehicles at the US 113 intersection in Dagsboro.

== History ==
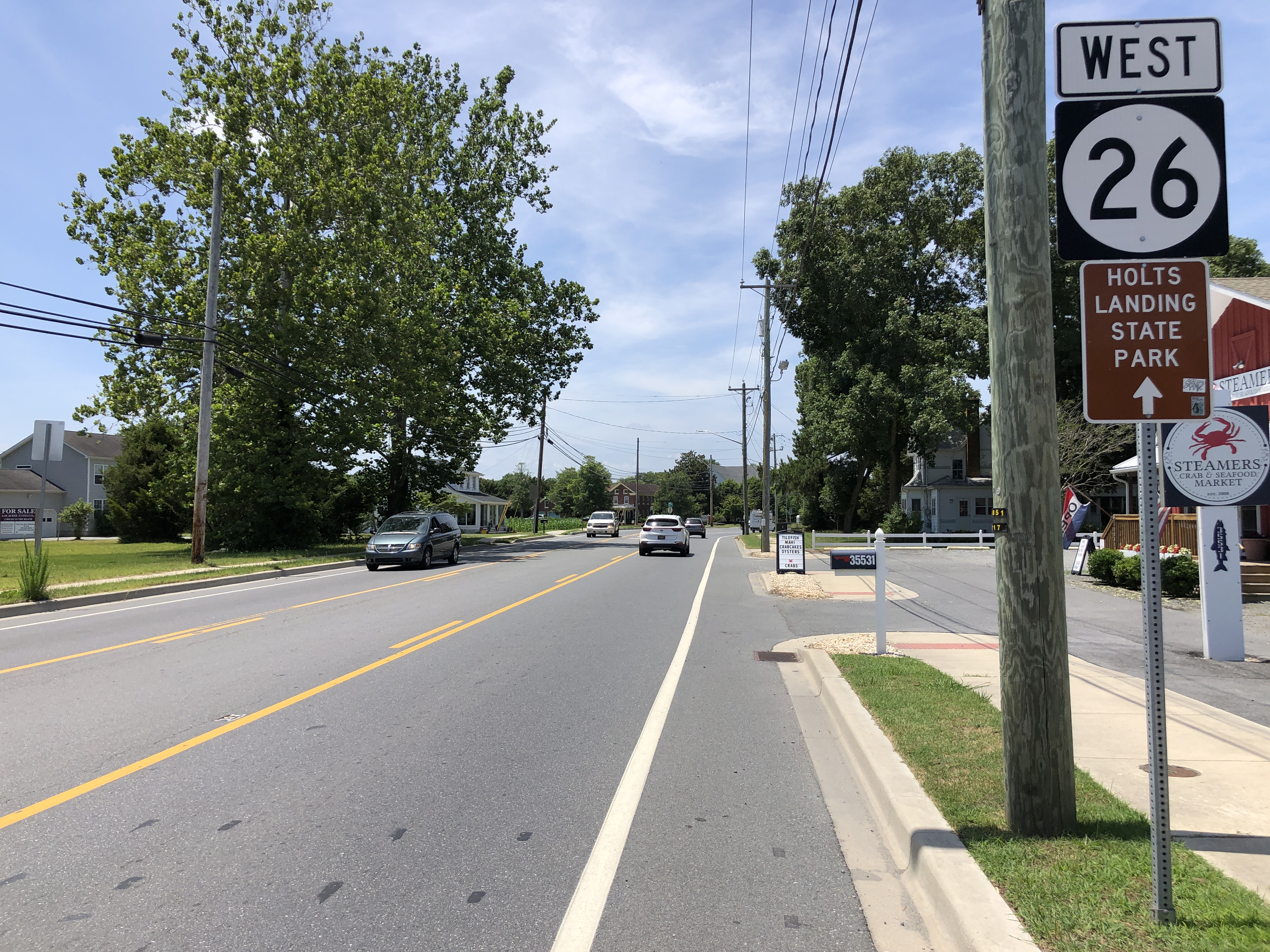
DE 26 westbound in Millville

By 1920, what is now DE 26 existed as an unimproved county road. The route was upgraded to a state highway between present-day US 113 and Dagsboro and from Millville to just west of the Assawoman Canal by 1924. A year later, the road was completed as a state highway between Gumboro and Mission and between Dagsboro and Vines Creek, with the route between the Maryland border and Gumboro and the incomplete sections between Dagsboro and Bethany Beach proposed as a state highway. The proposed segments were completed by 1931. In 1932, the state highway between Shaft Ox Corner and Dagsboro was completed. DE 26 was assigned to its current alignment between the Maryland border south of Gumboro and Bethany Beach, where it intersected the southern terminus of DE 14 (now part of DE 1), by 1936. In 2014, work began to widen DE 26 between Clarksville and the Assawoman Canal from a two-lane road to a three-lane road with a center left-turn lane, bike lanes, and new sidewalks in order to reduce traffic congestion. The widening project cost $57 million. On September 19, 2016, a ribbon-cutting ceremony took place to mark the completion of the project, with Governor Jack Markell, U.S. Senator Tom Carper, DelDOT Secretary Jennifer Cohan, State Senator Gerald Hocker, State Representative Ronald E. Gray, and Federal Highway Administration Division Administrator Mary Ridgeway in attendance.

== Major intersections ==
The entire route is in Sussex County.

Location	mi	km	Destinations	Notes
Gumboro	0.00	0.00	Route 54 west (East Line Road) – Delmar MD 353 south (Gumboro Road)	Maryland state line; western terminus; west end of DE 54 overlap
Gumboro	2.12	3.41	DE 54 east (Cypress Road)	East end of DE 54 overlap
Dagsboro	11.23	18.07	US 113 (Dupont Boulevard) – Millsboro, Selbyville	
Dagsboro	12.03	19.36	DE 20 west (Main Street) to US 113 north – Bay Bridge, Wilmington	West end of DE 20 overlap
Dagsboro	12.62	20.31	DE 20 east (Armory Road) – Fenwick Island	East end of DE 20 overlap
Millville	18.68	30.06	DE 17 south (Roxana Road) – Selbyville	Northern terminus of DE 17
Bethany Beach			DE 54 Alt. west (Kent Avenue) – Camp Barnes	Eastern terminus of DE 54 Alt.
Bethany Beach	22.71	36.55	DE 1 (Delaware Avenue) – Rehoboth Beach, Fenwick Island	Eastern terminus of DE 26 signage
Bethany Beach	22.96	36.95	Dead end at Atlantic Ocean	Eastern terminus
1.000 mi = 1.609 km; 1.000 km = 0.621 mi: Concurrency terminus
