= Delaware Route 17 =

State highway in Sussex County, Delaware, United States

Delaware Route 17
- DE 17 marked in red

Route information
- Maintained by DelDOT
- Length: 8.30 mi (13.36 km)
- Existed: 1938–present

Major junctions
- South end: DE 54 in Selbyville
- DE 20 in Roxana
- North end: DE 26 west of Millville

Location
- Country: United States
- State: Delaware
- Counties: Sussex

Highway system
- Delaware State Route System; List; Byways
← DE 16	→ DE 18

Delaware Route 17 (DE 17) is a two-lane undivided state highway located in Sussex County, Delaware. The route runs in a northeast-southwest direction between DE 54 in Selbyville and DE 26 west of Millville, crossing DE 20 in Roxana. It is called Bethany Road within Selbyville and Roxana Road for the remainder of its length. The route passes through rural areas of southeastern Sussex County. DE 17 serves to connect Selbyville with the Bethany Beach area. The route was built as a state highway in the 1920s and received the DE 17 designation by 1938.

== Route description ==
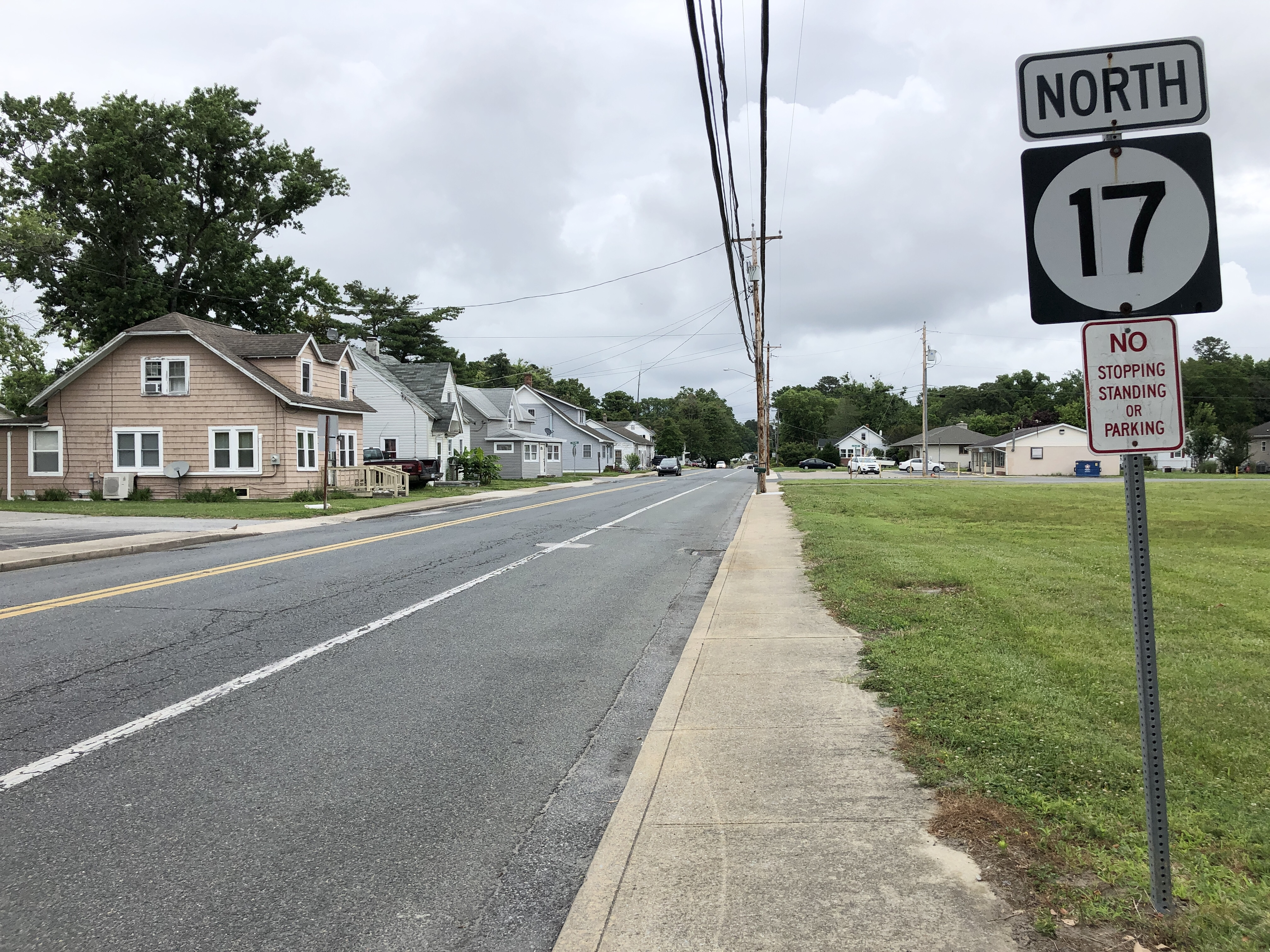
DE 17 northbound past DE 54 in Selbyville

DE 17 begins at an intersection with DE 54 in the town of Selbyville, where it heads northeast on Bethany Road. The route is a two-lane undivided road that runs through flat areas of the Atlantic coastal plain its entire length. From the southern terminus, the road passes several homes before leaving Selbyville. At this point, DE 17 enters a mix of farmland and woodland with some homes. Here, the name of road becomes Roxana Road. Upon reaching the community of Roxana, the roadway crosses DE 20. After DE 20, the road continues through rural areas. Following a turn to the north, the route comes to its terminus at an intersection with DE 26 to the west of the town of Millville.

In 2016, DE 17 had an annual average daily traffic count ranging from a high of 4,571 vehicles at the northern terminus at DE 26 to a low of 3,124 vehicles at the northern border of Selbyville. The portion of DE 17 between Daisey Road and Peppers Corner Road serves as part of a hurricane evacuation route from the coastal town of South Bethany, providing an alternate to DE 26 to the north.

== History ==
By 1920, what is now DE 17 was under construction as an unnumbered paved state highway between Selbyville and Roxana, with a small section of paved state highway complete near Roxana. It was also designated as a state aid road, a road that was to receive funding from the state to be built as a state highway by the county, from Roxana north to Millville. All of the route had been completed as an unnumbered paved state highway by 1924. DE 17 was designated by 1938 to run from DE 54 in Selbyville to DE 26 near Millville. The route has remained on the same alignment since.

== Major intersections ==
The entire route is in Sussex County.

Location	mi	km	Destinations	Notes
Selbyville	0.00	0.00	DE 54 (Main Street)	Southern terminus
Roxana	3.84	6.18	DE 20 (Pyle Center Road/Zion Church Road) – Omar, Dagsboro	
Millville	8.30	13.36	DE 26 (Atlantic Avenue) – Dagsboro, Bethany Beach	Northern terminus
1.000 mi = 1.609 km; 1.000 km = 0.621 mi
