= Bunting, Delaware =

Unincorporated community in Delaware, United States

- Unincorporated community
- Location within Delaware Location within the United States
- Coordinates: 38°27′48″N 75°9′15″W
- Country: United States
- State: Delaware
- County: Sussex
- Elevation: 16 ft (4.9 m)
- Time zone: UTC-5 (Eastern (EST))
  - Summer (DST): UTC-4 (EDT)
- Area code: 302
- GNIS feature ID: 216054

Bunting is an unincorporated community in Sussex County, Delaware, United States. Bunting is located at the intersection of state routes 54 and 54 Alternate, east of Selbyville.

== History ==
Bunting's population was 25 in 1890.
