= The Daily Times (Salisbury, Maryland) =

Newspaper in Salisbury, Maryland

- The paper's April 11, 2010, front page
- Type: Daily newspaper
- Format: Broadsheet
- Owner: USA Today Co.
- Founder: 1886; 140 years ago
- Managing editor: Keith Demko
- Headquarters: Salisbury, Maryland, United States
- Circulation: 16,500
- OCLC number: 9958506
- Website: delmarvanow.com

The Daily Times is a morning daily English-language (broadsheet) publication based in Salisbury, Maryland, United States, and primarily covers Wicomico, Worcester, and Somerset counties, and regional coverage across the Delmarva Peninsula. It has been a USA Today Co. publication since 2002. The online news product is Delmarva Now.

== History ==
The Daily Times was first owned by the Truitt family of Salisbury, Maryland. It was sold to Brush-Moore Newspapers of Canton, Ohio, in 1937; 30 years later, Brush-Moore was sold to Thomson Newspapers of Toronto, Canada. Gannett bought the paper from Thomson in 2000.

The paper began publication in 1886 as The Wicomico News, a weekly. On December 3, 1923, it became a daily and became The Evening Times and later The Salisbury Times, the Shoreman's Daily. It changed its Sunday name to The Sunday Times on October 22, 1967, to reflect its Sunday publication, while maintaining a five-day publication still known as The Daily Times. It became a morning publication on October 2, 1989. later, it dropped the name on Sunday and printed seven days a week under the name of The Daily Times.

In 2025, the paper switched from carrier to postal delivery.

=== Location ===
The paper was located on Main St. in downtown Salisbury, Maryland, for years, at a site that later became a men's apparel store. A new building was constructed on what was Upton St. (now Carroll Street), across from the Peninsula General Medical Center. The paper's home was on a site that had been the old Wicomico High School and before that in the 1860s, a Union encampment during the Civil War. The school was demolished to build a modern newspaper plant built in 1957. Photos of the open house on Upton Street are in the Nabbs Research Center at Salisbury University, along with photographs and several other items from the paper.

In 2008, the building was sold to the Peninsula Regional Medical Center for $1.8 million, and the paper moved to a site on Beam Street in the Northwood Industrial Park, north of Salisbury, where it purchased a building and installed a multimillion-dollar press.

On January 29, 2011, Delmarva Media Group announced that printing of The Daily Times, and other weekly publications, would be transferred to The News Journal's production facility in Wilmington, Delaware. Due to the move, 17 production jobs were eliminated.

From October 30, 2017, to February 2023, the newspaper had offices in downtown Salisbury at 115 S. Division St. at the former Salisbury Fire Department Station 16, which was formerly Headquarters Live music venue.

=== Management ===
Its first editor was Charles J. Truitt, who owned the paper with his cousin, Alfred Truitt. Editors followed included: Oscar L. Morris, Richard L. Moore, Mel Toadvine, Gary Grossman, Greg Bassett, Mike Kilian, Ted Shockley, David Ledford, Laura Benedict Sileo, and Keith Demko.

Alfred Truitt was its first publisher. Others who followed included Thomas D.Irvin, Dean Farmer, and Edward "Ed" White, Terry Hoppins, Keith Blevins, Larry Jock, Joni Silverstein, Rick Jensen, Greg Bassett, Tom Claybaugh, Bill Janus and Ronald(Ron) Pousson. A regional publisher now oversees The Daily Times.

== Weekly publications ==
In addition to the daily paper, special and seasonal publications and special inserts, The Daily Times is responsible for the publication of an assortment of associated regional weekly papers (see below). The Times and its associated broadsheets and weekly tabloids were branded the Strategic Marketing Group in 2001, and rebranded as the Delmarva Peninsula Media Group in 2006. The DMG serves a readership that covers Sussex County, Delaware; Somerset, Wicomico, and Worcester counties in Maryland; and Accomack and Northampton counties in Virginia.

=== Publications in the Delmarva Media Group ===
- The Chincoteague Beacon
- The Daily Times
- The Delaware Beachcomber
- The Delaware Coast Press
- The Delaware Wave
- The Eastern Shore News
- The Ocean Pines Independent
- The Maryland Beachcomber
- The Somerset Herald
- The Worcester County Times
- Coastal Delaware
- Wicomico Weekly

=== Defunct publications (merged with other extant publications) ===
- The Maryland Times-Press
- The Worcester County Messenger
- "Shore Woman"
