= Omar, Delaware =

Unincorporated community in Delaware, United States

- Unincorporated community
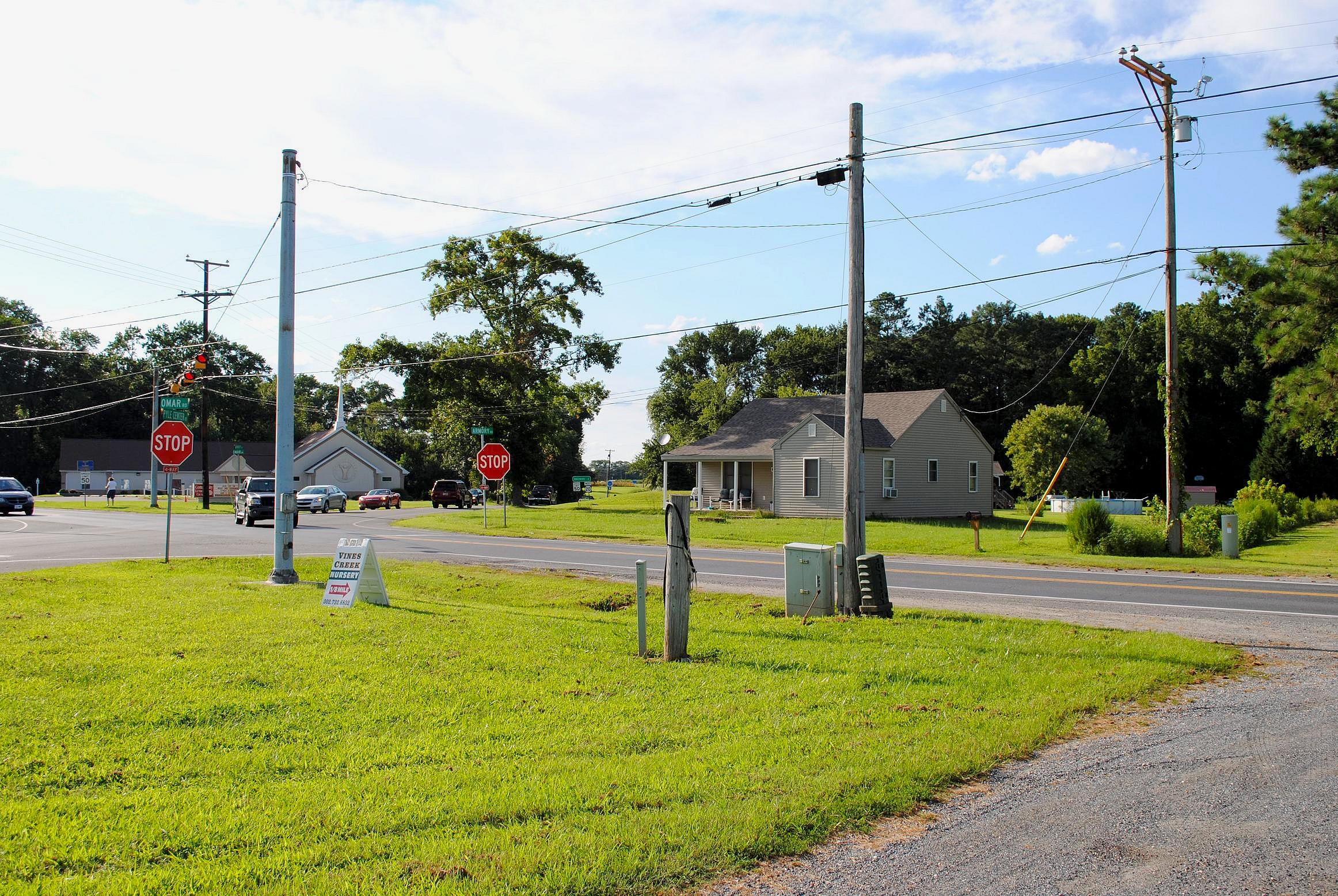
- Intersection of Delaware Route 20 and Omar Road in Omar

- Location within the state of Delaware Omar, Delaware (the United States)
- Coordinates: 38°31′38″N 75°11′59″W
- Country: United States
- State: Delaware
- County: Sussex
- Time zone: UTC-5 (Eastern (EST))
  - Summer (DST): UTC-4 (EDT)
- GNIS feature ID: 216170

Omar is an unincorporated community in Sussex County, Delaware, United States, located at the crossroads of Delaware Route 20 (Armory Road/Pyle Center Road) and Sussex County Road 54 (Omar Road) and between the towns of Dagsboro and Roxana.

Omar was a post village.

The Baltimore Mills Historic Archaeological Site was added to the National Register of Historic Places in 1997.
