= Blades, Delaware =

- Town
- Seal

- Location of Blades in Sussex County, Delaware.

- Location within the state of Delaware Blades (the United States)
- Coordinates: 38°38′08″N 75°36′36″W
- Country: United States
- State: Delaware
- County: Sussex
- Settled: 1850s
- Incorporated: 1915

Area
  - Total: 0.56 sq mi (1.44 km^{2})
  - Land: 0.56 sq mi (1.44 km^{2})
  - Water: 0 sq mi (0.00 km^{2})
- Elevation: 13 ft (4.0 m)

Population (2020)
  - Total: 1,179
  - Density: 2,122.3/sq mi (819.42/km^{2})
- Time zone: UTC−5 (Eastern (EST))
  - Summer (DST): UTC−4 (EDT)
- ZIP code: 19973
- Area code: 302
- FIPS code: 10-06730
- GNIS feature ID: 213680
- Website: blades.delaware.gov

Blades is a town in Sussex County, Delaware, United States. As of the 2020 census, the town had a population of 1,179. It is part of the Salisbury, Maryland-Delaware Metropolitan Statistical Area.

== History ==
Blades' population was 143 in 1900.

== Geography ==
Blades is located at 38°38′08″N 75°36′36″W (38.6356701, –75.6099270).

According to the United States Census Bureau, the town has a total area of 0.4 square miles (1.0 km^{2}), all land.

== Demographics ==
Historical population
Census	Pop.	Note	%±
1920	388		—
1930	466		20.1%
1940	601		29.0%
1950	789		31.3%
1960	729		−7.6%
1970	632		−13.3%
1980	664		5.1%
1990	834		25.6%
2000	956		14.6%
2010	1,241		29.8%
2020	1,179		−5.0%
U.S. Decennial Census

=== 2020 census ===
As of the 2020 census, Blades had a population of 1,179. The median age was 37.3 years. 26.8% of residents were under the age of 18 and 18.5% of residents were 65 years of age or older. For every 100 females there were 96.5 males, and for every 100 females age 18 and over there were 92.2 males age 18 and over.

100.0% of residents lived in urban areas, while 0.0% lived in rural areas.

There were 423 households in Blades, of which 37.4% had children under the age of 18 living in them. Of all households, 37.4% were married-couple households, 18.9% were households with a male householder and no spouse or partner present, and 34.5% were households with a female householder and no spouse or partner present. About 26.0% of all households were made up of individuals and 13.2% had someone living alone who was 65 years of age or older.

There were 477 housing units, of which 11.3% were vacant. The homeowner vacancy rate was 5.9% and the rental vacancy rate was 9.3%.

Racial composition as of the 2020 census
Race	Number	Percent
White	557	47.2%
Black or African American	318	27.0%
American Indian and Alaska Native	9	0.8%
Asian	6	0.5%
Native Hawaiian and Other Pacific Islander	0	0.0%
Some other race	138	11.7%
Two or more races	151	12.8%
Hispanic or Latino (of any race)	237	20.1%

=== 2000 census ===
At the 2000 census there were 956 people, 353 households, and 236 families living in the town. The population density was 2,201.4 inhabitants per square mile (850.0/km^{2}). There were 393 housing units at an average density of 905.0 per square mile (349.4/km^{2}). The racial makeup of the town was 69.77% White, 21.76% African American, 0.52% Native American, 1.05% Asian, 0.10% Pacific Islander, 3.97% from other races, and 2.82% from two or more races. Hispanic or Latino of any race were 6.59%.

There were 353 households, 36.3% had children under the age of 18 living with them, 41.6% were married couples living together, 19.5% had a female householder with no husband present, and 33.1% were non-families. 23.8% of households were made up of individuals, and 6.5% were one person aged 65 or older. The average household size was 2.70 people and the average family size was 3.23 people.

The age distribution was 29.2% under the age of 18, 9.2% from 18 to 24, 33.7% from 25 to 44, 20.9% from 45 to 64, and 7.0% 65 or older. The median age was 33 years. For every 100 females, there were 88.6 males. For every 100 females age 18 and over, there were 82.0 males.

The median household income was $28,864 and the median family income was $33,194. Males had a median income of $25,139 versus $21,339 for females. The per capita income for the town was $13,495. About 15.9% of families and 20.3% of the population were below the poverty line, including 30.1% of those under age 18 and 10.5% of those age 65 or over.

== Education ==
Blades is in the Seaford School District. Its high school is Seaford Senior High School.

== Transportation ==
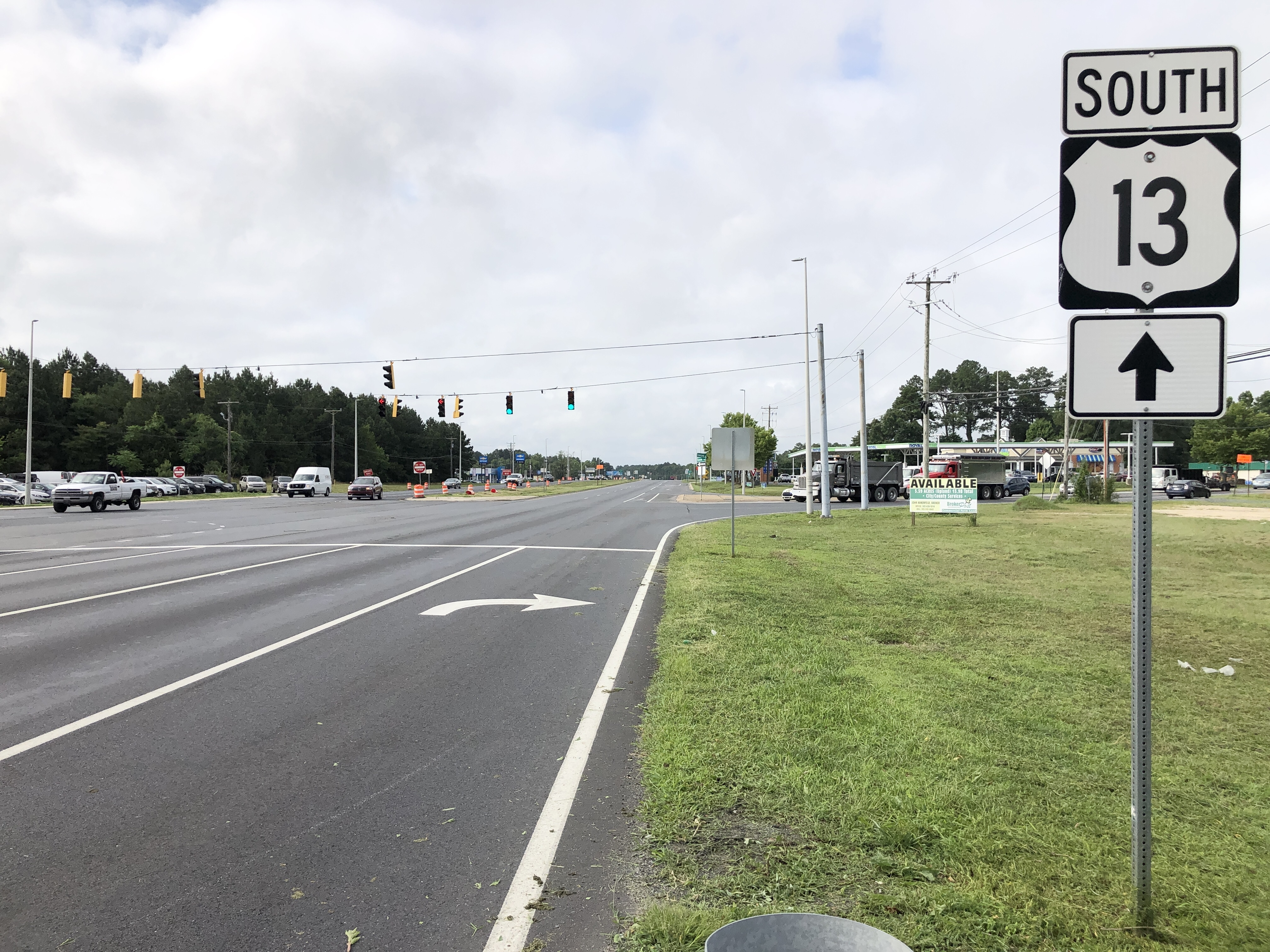
US 13 southbound at DE 20 on the edge of Blades

Roads are the primary method of travel into and out of Blades. U.S. Route 13 (Sussex Highway) is the main highway serving the town, brushing the eastern edges on its way northward towards Dover and southwards towards Salisbury. Delaware Route 20 also brushes the northeast edge of town as it follows a generally east–west alignment through the region. DART First State operates the Route 212 bus that connects Blades with Delmar and Georgetown. The Delmarva Central Railroad's Delmarva Subdivision line passes north–south along the western edge of Blades.
