= Pepper Creek (Delaware) =

- Location within Delaware Location within the United States

Location
- Country: United States
- State: Delaware
- County: Sussex
- City: Frankford

Physical characteristics
- Source: On the watershed divide between Pepper Creek and Pocomoke River
  - location: Frankford, Delaware
  - coordinates: 38°32′07″N 075°17′14″W
  - elevation: about 40 feet amsl
- Mouth: just south of Oak Orchard, Delaware
  - location: Clarksville, Delaware
  - coordinates: 38°35′16″N 075°10′03″W
  - elevation: sea level (0 ft.)

Basin features
- Progression: northeast
- River system: Indian River

Pepper Creek is a stream approximately 8 mi (13 km) long in southern Delaware in the United States.

It rises in Cypress Swamp in southern Sussex County, approximately 3 mi (5 km) north of the Maryland state line. It flows generally east-northeast, past Dagsboro and into Indian River Bay, an inlet of the Atlantic Ocean, approximately 2 mi (3 km) northwest of Millville.

The upper course of the creek is connected by channelized ditches through Cypress Swamp to the headwaters of the Pocomoke River.

== See also ==
- List of Delaware rivers
