= John Dagworthy =

Brigadier general during the American Revolutionary War (1721–1784)

- Born: 1721
- Died: 1784 (aged 62–63)
- Burial place: Dagsboro, Delaware
- Military career
- Allegiance: Kingdom of Great Britain; United States
- Branch: Provincial Troops; Delaware Militia
- Rank: Captain; Brigadier general (Militia)
- Unit: 1st New Jersey Regiment
- Commands: Maryland Garrison Battalion; Fort Cumberland; Sussex County Militia
- Conflicts: King George's War; French and Indian War; American Revolutionary War

John Dagworthy (1721–1784) was from Trenton, New Jersey, and had a military career that spanned three wars. During King George's War Dagworthy recruited a company of soldiers and was given command over them. During the French and Indian War he was a captain in command at Fort Cumberland. When George Washington of the Virginia militia, returned with the survivors of the Braddock Expedition Dagworthy became involved in a lengthy dispute with Washington, challenging him over matters of rank and seniority. During the American Revolutionary War he was a brigadier general commanding the Sussex County (Delaware) militia.

== Background ==
John Dagworthy, born in 1721, came from a prominent Royalist family in Trenton, New Jersey and was a devoted member of the Anglican Church of England. He went on to serve in three different wars during his military career.

== King George's War ==
His first military service occurred when he served in King George's War against France. He was commissioned a captain on August 23, 1746, and recruited a company of soldiers that later would join the regiment of Colonel Peter Schuyler. His company participated in the proposed invasion of Canada up the Hudson valley, which never actually got underway. At this time the Council of New Jersey wrote to the Duke of Newcastle with the intention of getting a commission for Dagworthy. To this end the young captain Dagworthy sailed to England in the interest of his own cause, where he finally got his wish and received a royal commission in His Majesty's service.

== French and Indian War ==
During the French and Indian War Captain John Dagworthy, was under the overall command of Colonel James Innes, the commander-in-chief of colonial forces at that time. Dagworthy was in command of the troops of the Maryland militia who built Fort Cumberland, a crude frontier fort constructed at the confluence of Wills Creek and the Potomac River in the autumn of 1754. The fort at this time marked the westernmost outpost of the British Empire in America. The fort was the starting point for General Braddock's failed expedition against the French at Fort Duquesne, located in present-day Pittsburgh, Pennsylvania. When Braddock was killed, George Washington, at the time a young officer of the Virginia militia, led the surviving troops back to Fort Cumberland.

In 1746, Dagworthy obtained a royal commission for an intended expedition against the French in Canada that never materialized—he only functioned as a recruiter for the proposed expedition. Dagworthy was under the notion that a royal commission, even though outdated, somehow rendered his rank superior to that of a colonial major. Dagworthy first encountered George Washington, who was then twenty-two, in 1755, on the Maryland frontier at Fort Cumberland. Although Washington possessed a superior rank, Dagworthy refused to recognize his command.

As a captain in the British Provincial Troops, Dagworthy disputed the authority of George Washington. At that time, Washington was a major in the Virginia militia, a rank that Dagworthy considered inferior to his own Royal commission as a captain. The fort was built at the confluence of Wills Creek and the Potomac River, by troops of the Maryland militia under Dagworthy's command, in the fall of 1754.

Washington deeply resented the idea that a British captain considered himself to be of superior rank, especially since Dagworthy had obtained his royal commission for a price. When Dagworthy challenged Washington's authority, Washington in a letter of 5 December 1755, to Virginia Lieutenant Governor Robert Dinwiddie, his long-time friend, protested Dagworthy's challenge and threatened to resign, and declared, "I can never submit to the command of Captain Dagworthy." Dinwiddie sent a letter of appeal to Massachusetts Governor William Shirley. Washington wanted Shirley to have his regiment absorbed into the British army. Dinwiddie then granted Washington permission to travel to Boston in February 1756 so he could discuss matters with Shirley in person. Shirley reasserted Washington's command over Dagworthy, but never granted Washington a royal commission.

Washington's attempts to obtain a royal commission continued to fail, and eventually distanced Washington from his superiors. The matter also increased the doubt in Washington's mind about American colonists' place in the British Empire.

== American Revolutionary War ==
When the American Revolutionary War broke out between the colonies and Great Britain, Dagworthy became a member of the Sussex County Committee of Safety and duly assigned a military post. In the Committee meeting records of September 16, 1775 he is referred to as a colonel in reference to his previous service, but in the January 1776 Committee records he is referred to as a brigadier general of Sussex County.

Dagworthy was not given a field command in the Continental Army, but was instead given command of the Sussex County militia. Sussex county was at the southern end of Delaware and often considered of little regard by military and Delaware officials, who were more concerned with British ships making their way through Delaware Bay and up the river to Philadelphia. The Delaware River and Bay also gave the Philadelphia access to the sea.

Dagworthy's sister, Mary Dagworthy, married Abraham Hunt, a Lieutenant Colonel in the New Jersey militia, famous for his role in befriending Hessian commander Johann Rall and keeping him preoccupied while George Washington mounted a successful surprise attack at the Battle of Trenton in New Jersey.

Dagworthy's remains are buried in the cemetery of Prince George's Chapel, located in Dagsboro. The town of Dagsboro, Delaware and the Dagsboro Hundred both take their names from General Dagworthy.

== Bibliography ==
- Chernow, Ron (5 October 2010). Washington, a Life. Penguin Books. ISBN 978-1-1014-44184.
- Freeman, Douglas Southall (1948). Young Washington. Vol. II. New York, NY : Charles Scribner's Sons.
- Schuyler, Hamilton (1929). A history of Trenton, 1679-1929. Princeton : Princeton University Press: The Trenton Historical Society.
- "General John Dagworthy". Sussex County Online.
- "Delmarvan Once Disputed Gen. Washington's Rank". Salisbury Times. June 29, 1962.
- "Sussex County Markers: Prince George's Chapel". Delaware Public Archives. Archived from the original on July 30, 2014.
- Michael Morgan (6 October 2010). "Stubborn Mr. John Dagworthy". Delmarvanow.com. Archived from the original on 2 April 2015.
- Smith Jr., Claiborne T. (1988). "Innes, James". In Powell, William S (ed.). Dictionary of North Carolina Biography. Vol. 3 (H-K). Chapel Hill: University of North Carolina Press. p. 252. ISBN 978-0-8078-18060.
- Stern, Eric (October 11, 2017). "General John Dagworthy: George Washington's Forgotten American Rival". Journal of the American Revolution.
- Smith, Craig Bruce. "Dagworthy Controversy". Mount Vernon Ladies’ Association.
