= Prince George's Chapel =

Historic chapel in Delaware, US

- U.S. National Register of Historic Places
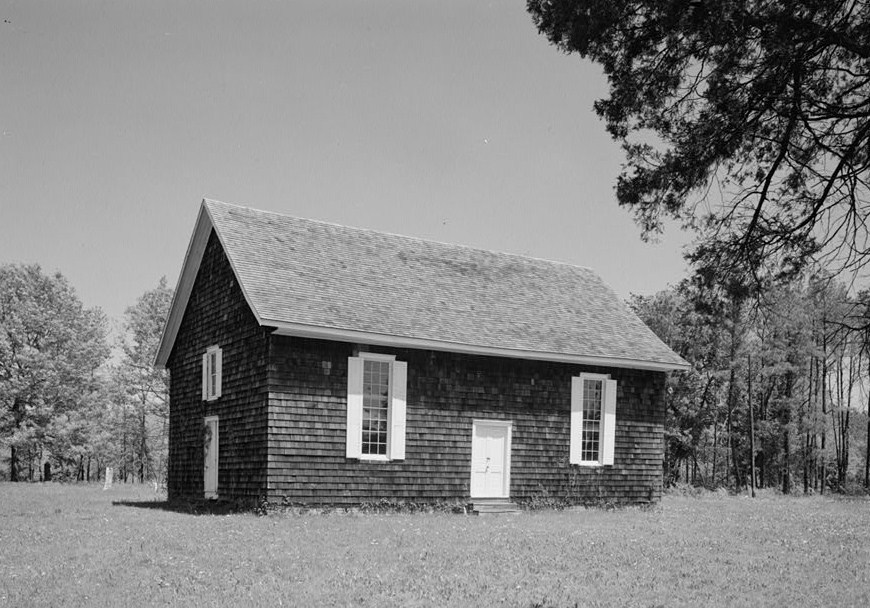
- Prince George's Chapel in 1960

- Location within Delaware Location within the United States
- Location: East of Dagsboro on Delaware Route 26, near Dagsboro, Delaware
- Coordinates: 38°32′54″N 75°14′22″W
- Area: 2.3 acres (0.93 ha)
- Built: 1757
- Architectural style: English Tradition
- NRHP reference No.: 71000235
- Added to NRHP: March 24, 1971

Prince George's Chapel is a historic Episcopal chapel of ease located in Dagsboro, Sussex County, Delaware. It was built in what was then a rural area in 1755 as a chapel-of-ease for St. Martin's Church, Worcester Parish, Maryland. Churches built to serve the outlying areas of a parish where it was difficult for people to travel to the main church were given a chapel-of-ease designation. On June 30, 1757, the completed chapel was received by the vestry, dedicated, and named "Prince George's Chapel" for England's Prince George, later George III of the United Kingdom. It is a small, shingled structure. A transept and chancel were added about 1763, but these have been removed. The interior features a vaulted ceiling of heart-pine, timbered pine pillars. The State of Delaware purchased the property in 1967 and renovated the building.

The site was added to the National Register of Historic Places in 1971.

== Notable burials in church's cemetery ==
- General John Dagworthy, namesake of Dagsboro, Revolutionary War veteran
