= Millville, Delaware =

- Town
- Flag Seal
- Motto: "A Beautiful Way Of Life"
- Location of Millville in Sussex County, Delaware.

- Location within the state of Delaware Millville (the United States)
- Coordinates: 38°32′58″N 75°07′24″W
- Country: United States
- State: Delaware
- County: Sussex

Area
  - Total: 2.55 sq mi (6.61 km^{2})
  - Land: 2.55 sq mi (6.61 km^{2})
  - Water: 0 sq mi (0.00 km^{2})
- Elevation: 13 ft (4.0 m)

Population (2020)
  - Total: 1,825
  - Density: 715.1/sq mi (276.11/km^{2})
- Time zone: UTC−5 (Eastern (EST))
  - Summer (DST): UTC−4 (EDT)
- ZIP codes: 19967, 19970
- Area code: 302
- FIPS code: 10-48200
- GNIS feature ID: 214323
- Website: millville.delaware.gov

Millville is a town in Sussex County, Delaware, United States. The population in 2020 was 1,825, It is part of the Salisbury, Maryland-Delaware Metropolitan Statistical Area and lies within Baltimore Hundred.

== Geography ==
Millville is located at 38°32′58″N 75°07′24″W (38.5495569, –75.1232391), approximately 1 mile (2 km) west of the Atlantic Ocean and about 1 mile (2 km) south of Indian River Bay. It is contiguous on the east with Ocean View, and bordered on the north, west and south by unincorporated portions of Sussex County.

According to the United States Census Bureau, the town has a total area of 0.5 square miles (1.3 km^{2}), in which all of it was land.

== Demographics ==
=== 2020 census ===
As of the 2020 census, Millville had a population of 1,825. The median age was 64.0 years. 8.0% of residents were under the age of 18 and 46.4% of residents were 65 years of age or older. For every 100 females there were 84.2 males, and for every 100 females age 18 and over there were 81.7 males age 18 and over.

99.0% of residents lived in urban areas, while 1.0% lived in rural areas.

There were 928 households in Millville, of which 12.4% had children under the age of 18 living in them. Of all households, 60.8% were married-couple households, 9.5% were households with a male householder and no spouse or partner present, and 26.2% were households with a female householder and no spouse or partner present. About 27.5% of all households were made up of individuals and 17.7% had someone living alone who was 65 years of age or older.

There were 1,532 housing units, of which 39.4% were vacant. The homeowner vacancy rate was 0.7% and the rental vacancy rate was 17.5%.

Racial composition as of the 2020 census
Race	Number	Percent
White	1,692	92.7%
Black or African American	25	1.4%
American Indian and Alaska Native	0	0.0%
Asian	12	0.7%
Native Hawaiian and Other Pacific Islander	0	0.0%
Some other race	9	0.5%
Two or more races	87	4.8%
Hispanic or Latino (of any race)	56	3.1%

== Transportation ==
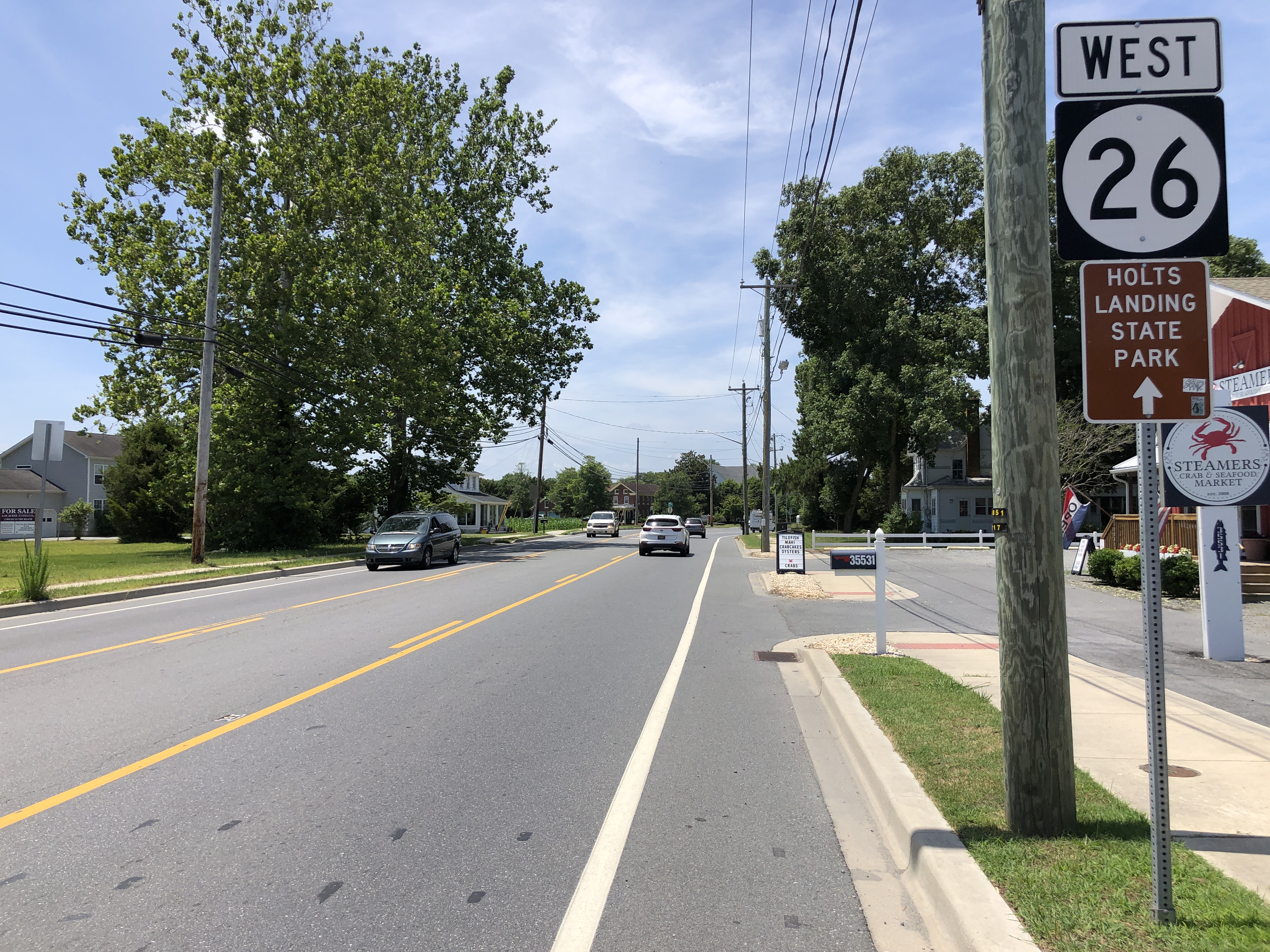
DE 26 westbound in Millville

Roads are the main means of transportation to and from Millville. Delaware Route 26 is the primary state highway serving the town, passing through on an east–west alignment. It heads eastward toward Bethany Beach and west to U.S. Route 113 in Dagsboro. Delaware Route 17 is the other primary highway serving Millville, heading southwestward from its junction with DE 26 just northwest of town, skimming the southwestern edge of town, then traversing rural areas until it reaches Selbyville.

== Government ==
=== Elected officials ===
Millville has a council-manager form of government. Under the current governmental structure and electoral system, which went into effect with the election of March 3, 2001, a five-person town council governs the town. After each election, the council elects one of its members to serve as mayor. Another council member serves as deputy mayor, another as treasurer, and another as secretary, while the fifth council member serves as a council member alone with no additional duties. Each council member serves a two-year term, and the terms are staggered so that three of the council members are elected in each odd-numbered year and two in each even-numbered year.

The Annual Municipal Election is held on the first Saturday in March. Anyone 18 years old or older registered to vote in Millville may run for the town council as long as the candidate has lived in Millville for at least 90 days before the date of that year's election.

If only one person runs for a particular council seat, that person takes office automatically without any election being held that year for that seat. If no one runs for a particular council seat, the incumbent automatically serves another term without any election being held that year for that seat.

=== Appointed officials and town operations ===
Junior Firefighter Helmet for the Millville Volunteer Fire Company

A town manager oversees the day-to-day operations of the town. The Delaware State Police provides police service to Millville under a contract with the Town and the Millville Volunteer Fire Company serves Millville, Ocean View, and unincorporated portions of Sussex County as far east as the Assawoman Canal and as almost as far west as Dagsboro; it purchased its first motor-driven firefighting vehicle in 1936 and today operates 16 vehicles.

Sussex County handled all land use regulation in Millville until 1993, when Millville itself began to pass zoning ordinances to control growth.

== History ==
The early settlement of the Millville area by Europeans is poorly recorded, although it is known that the swampy, marshy nature of much of the land of eastern Baltimore Hundred in southeastern Delaware when the first Europeans arrived led them to establish plantations on higher ground in the vicinity of what are now Millville, Ocean View, and Clarksville. Millville itself grew up around a steam-powered sawmill operated by Captain Peter Townshend in the late 19th century, becoming a center for lumber, agricultural products, and commercial fishing.

For a time, the names "Dukestown" and "Dukesville" were considered for the town because of the prominence and number of members of the Dukes family who lived in the area. Eventually, the town was named Millville because of the sorghum mills, lumber mills and grist mills in the area.

Millville was incorporated in 1906. It had a population of 206 at the time, and has grown in population only very slowly since, reaching only 259 by the 2000 census. However, the population more than doubled by the 2010 census, rising to 544 residents, the highest in the recorded history of Millville.

Millville was considered the principal town of Baltimore Hundred, although this today lacks meaning because Delaware's hundreds lost their political functions long ago and now serve only as geographic points of reference.

Historical population
Census	Pop.	Note	%±
1910	193		—
1920	112		−42.0%
1930	193		72.3%
1940	184		−4.7%
1950	270		46.7%
1960	231		−14.4%
1970	224		−3.0%
1980	178		−20.5%
1990	206		15.7%
2000	259		25.7%
2010	544		110.0%
2020	1,825		235.5%
U.S. Decennial Census
