= Roxana, Delaware =

Unincorporated community in Delaware, United States

- Unincorporated community
- Location within the state of Delaware Roxana (the United States)
- Coordinates: 38°29′47″N 75°10′11″W
- Country: United States
- State: Delaware
- County: Sussex
- Elevation: 33 ft (10 m)
- Time zone: UTC-5 (Eastern (EST))
  - Summer (DST): UTC-4 (EDT)
- ZIP code: 19945
- Area code: 302
- GNIS feature ID: 216200

Roxana is an unincorporated community and former municipality, from 1909 to 1921, in southeastern Sussex County, Delaware, United States. It is roughly centered on the intersection of Delaware Route 20 and Delaware Route 17. It is part of the Salisbury, Maryland-Delaware Metropolitan Statistical Area.

== History ==
Historical population
Census	Pop.	Note	%±
1910	155		—
1920	145		−6.5%
U.S. Decennial Census

Roxana was originally named the "Village of Centreville" and underwent a name change to Roxana that was passed by the Delaware General Assembly on April 2, 1869. An act to incorporate the "town of Roxana" was brought before the Delaware Senate on February 16, 1909, by Senator Drexler and passed on February 25, 1909. The bill to incorporate Roxana was then passed by the Delaware House of Representatives on March 12, 1909.

On February 16, 1921, Representative E.J. Turner presented a bill to the Delaware House of Representatives revoking the charter of the town of Roxana, which was passed. The same bill was passed by the Delaware Senate on February 28, 1921, bringing an end to Roxana's 12-year municipal status as a town.

== Public safety ==
Roxana is served by the Roxana Fire Company Station 90, which provides fire protection to the community along with nearby areas in southeastern Sussex County. The Roxana Fire Company was founded in 1960. Lacking municipal or county police forces, these services are provided by the Delaware State Police.

== Sports ==
Roxana is home to the Little League Baseball Senior League Softball World Series, held every year at the Lower Sussex Little League Complex north of the community.
