= Selbyville, Delaware =

- Town
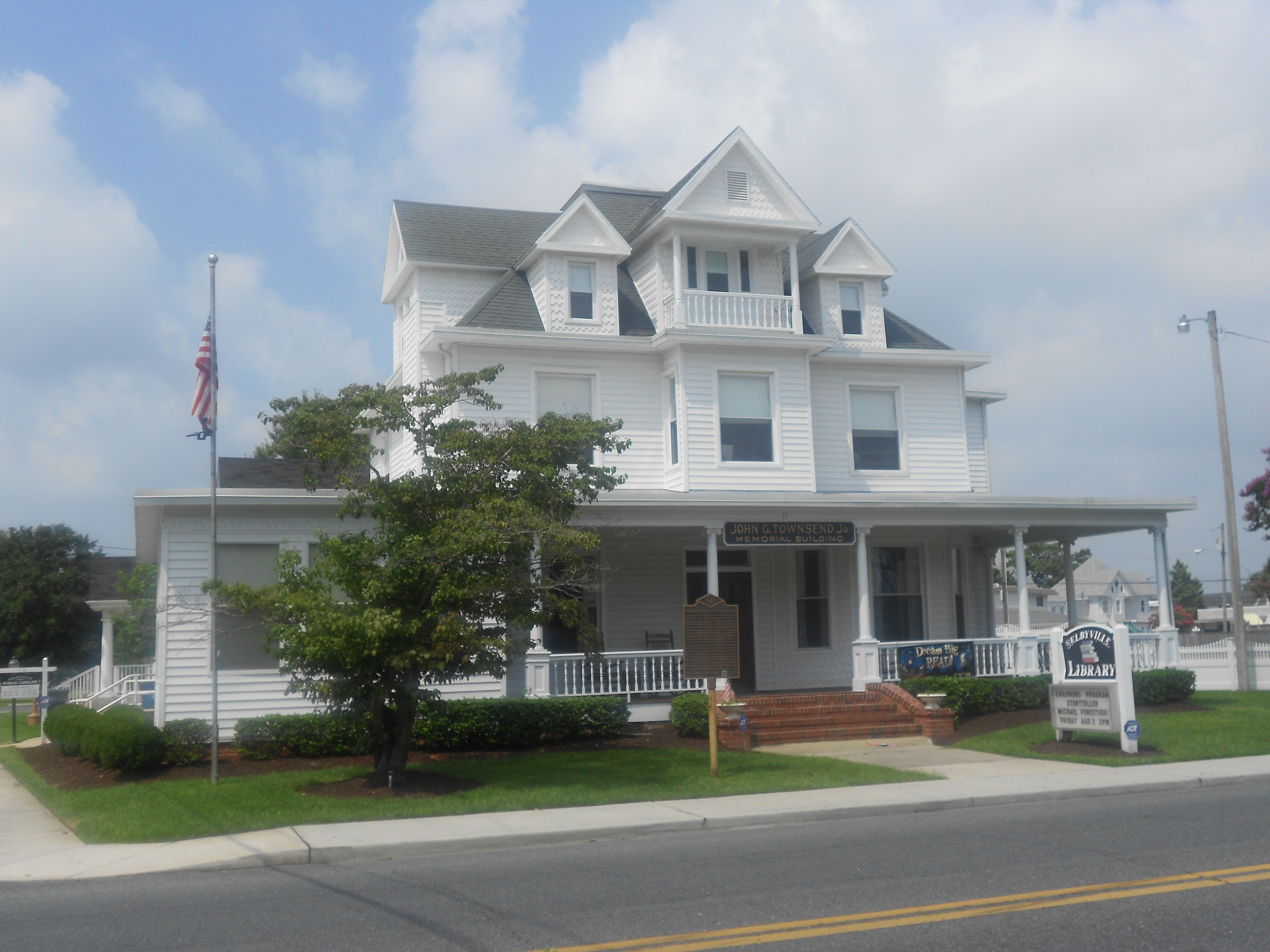
- Selbyville Library, July 2012

- Seal

- Location of Selbyville in Sussex County, Delaware.

- Location within the state of Delaware Selbyville (the United States)
- Coordinates: 38°27′37″N 75°13′15″W
- Country: United States
- State: Delaware
- County: Sussex
- Founded: 1778
- Incorporated: 1902

Area
  - Total: 3.59 sq mi (9.31 km^{2})
  - Land: 3.59 sq mi (9.29 km^{2})
  - Water: 0.0077 sq mi (0.02 km^{2})
- Elevation: 36 ft (11 m)

Population (2020)
  - Total: 2,878
  - Density: 802.1/sq mi (309.71/km^{2})
- Time zone: UTC-5 (Eastern (EST))
  - Summer (DST): UTC-4 (EDT)
- ZIP codes: 19944, 19975
- Area code: 302
- FIPS code: 10-64840
- GNIS feature ID: 214630
- Website: selbyville.delaware.gov

Selbyville is a town in Sussex County, Delaware, United States. As of the 2020 census, Selbyville had a population of 2,878. It is part of the Salisbury, Maryland-Delaware Metropolitan Statistical Area.

== History ==
Selbyville was founded in 1778 and incorporated in 1902.

It was originally known as Sandy Branch, due to its location on a branch of that name emanating in the Cypress Swamp at the head of the St. Martin's River. A grist mill and saw mill opened there in the late 18th century. In 1842, Sampson Selby began marking packages for delivery to his country store, Selby-Ville.

By 1918, Selbyville was the major supplier of strawberries for the east coast, an industry that remained strong until the 1930s.

Today, one of its main employers is Mountaire Farms, a poultry company with a processing plant on Hosier Street.

The town is also home of the Mumford Sheet Metal Works, which held the world record for the largest frying pan in 1950.

Selbyville is also home to Doyle's Restaurant, recognized by the State of Delaware as the state's oldest operating diner. (The original 1930s diner is attached to a modern expansion.)

== Transportation ==
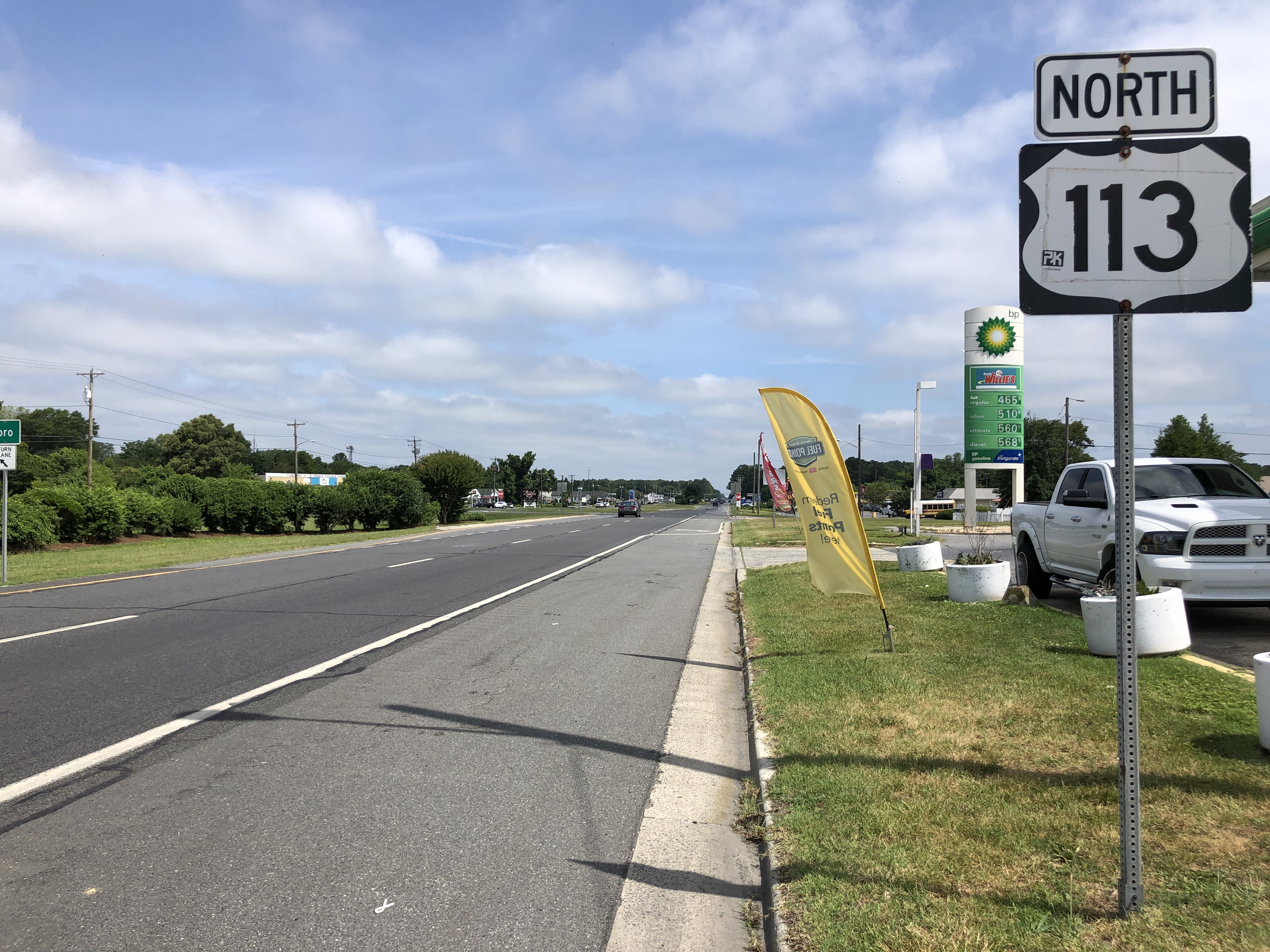
US 113 northbound in Selbyville

The main means of transport to and from Selbyville is by road. U.S. Route 113 is the primary highway serving the town, connecting north towards Georgetown and south into Maryland. Delaware Route 54 also serves the town, traversing east to west along the southern edge of the state. Finally, Delaware Route 17 extends northeastward from Selbyville to Millville. The Snow Hill Line of the Maryland and Delaware Railroad runs north–south through Selbyville.

== Geography ==
Selbyville is located at 38°27′37″N 75°13′15″W (38.4603917, –75.2207438).

According to the United States Census Bureau, the town has a total area of 1.4 square miles (3.6 km^{2}), all land.

== Demographics ==
Historical population
Census	Pop.	Note	%±
1880	149		—
1910	342		—
1920	462		35.1%
1930	661		43.1%
1940	882		33.4%
1950	1,086		23.1%
1960	1,080		−0.6%
1970	1,099		1.8%
1980	1,251		13.8%
1990	1,335		6.7%
2000	1,645		23.2%
2010	2,167		31.7%
2020	2,878		32.8%
U.S. Decennial Census

=== 2020 census ===
As of the 2020 census, Selbyville had a population of 2,878. The median age was 51.0 years. 18.0% of residents were under the age of 18 and 29.5% of residents were 65 years of age or older. For every 100 females there were 93.7 males, and for every 100 females age 18 and over there were 94.2 males age 18 and over.

0.0% of residents lived in urban areas, while 100.0% lived in rural areas.

There were 1,186 households in Selbyville, of which 26.5% had children under the age of 18 living in them. Of all households, 56.2% were married-couple households, 13.7% were households with a male householder and no spouse or partner present, and 24.3% were households with a female householder and no spouse or partner present. About 24.9% of all households were made up of individuals and 15.0% had someone living alone who was 65 years of age or older.

There were 1,315 housing units, of which 9.8% were vacant. The homeowner vacancy rate was 0.3% and the rental vacancy rate was 4.7%.

Racial composition as of the 2020 census
Race	Number	Percent
White	2,000	69.5%
Black or African American	187	6.5%
American Indian and Alaska Native	39	1.4%
Asian	33	1.1%
Native Hawaiian and Other Pacific Islander	0	0.0%
Some other race	371	12.9%
Two or more races	248	8.6%
Hispanic or Latino (of any race)	627	21.8%

=== 2000 census ===
At the 2000 census there were 1,645 people, 615 households, and 439 families living in the town. The population density was 1,176.9 inhabitants per square mile (454.4/km^{2}). There were 664 housing units at an average density of 475.1 units per square mile (183.4 units/km^{2}). The racial makeup of the town was 72.89% White, 15.38% African American, 0.73% Asian, 0.55% Pacific Islander, 9.48% from other races, and 0.97% from two or more races. Hispanic or Latino of any race were 21.09%.

Of the 615 households 28.3% had children under the age of 18 living with them, 51.9% were married couples living together, 14.0% had a female householder with no husband present, and 28.6% were non-families. 24.6% of households were one person and 13.8% were one person aged 65 or older. The average household size was 2.67 and the average family size was 3.05.

The age distribution was 24.3% under the age of 18, 7.7% from 18 to 24, 28.7% from 25 to 44, 21.7% from 45 to 64, and 17.6% 65 or older. The median age was 37 years. For every 100 females, there were 104.1 males. For every 100 females age 18 and over, there were 95.8 males.

The median household income was $36,250 and the median family income was $41,522. Males had a median income of $25,368 versus $20,660 for females. The per capita income for the town was $16,965. About 10.6% of families and 11.7% of the population were below the poverty line, including 13.4% of those under age 18 and 12.4% of those age 65 or over.

== Education ==
It is in the Indian River School District.

On March 8, 1881, the Delaware General Assembly created Selbyville School District 32. That district merged into the Indian River district on July 1, 1969.

=== Public library ===
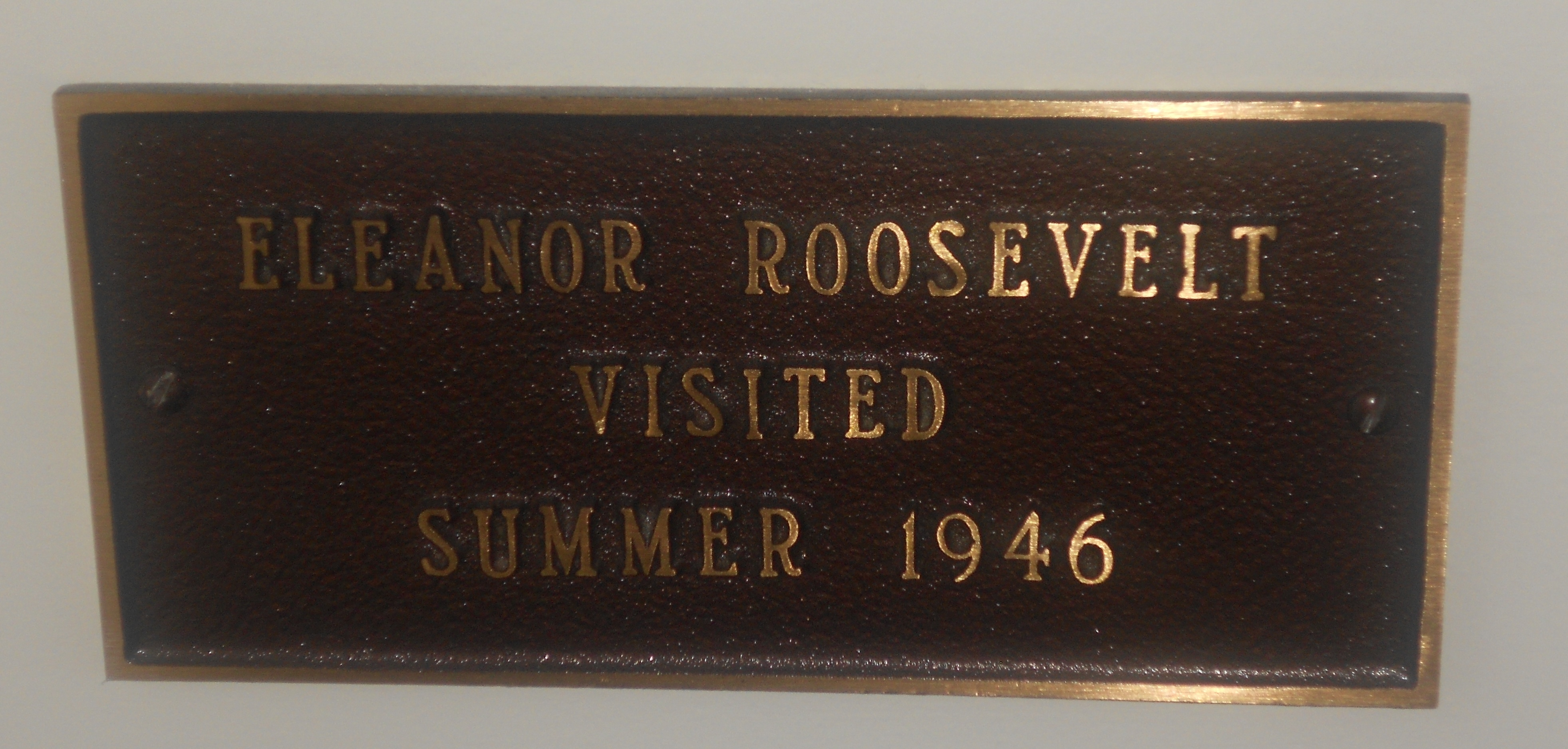
Sign inside Selbyville Public Library, commemorating former First Lady Eleanor Roosevelt's visit in 1946

The former home of Senator John G. Townsend, Jr., located at 11 South Main Street at the intersection with West McCabe Street, became the site of the Selbyville Public Library in 1966. A plaque in the library identifies Senator Townsend's dining room, where former First Lady Eleanor Roosevelt dined with the senator in 1946. Other distinguished visitors included future president Richard Nixon. The home was built in 1904. The senator's family donated it to the library after his death. The home is now site of the Selbyville Historical Society.

== See also ==
- List of towns in Delaware
