= Dagsboro, Delaware =

- Town
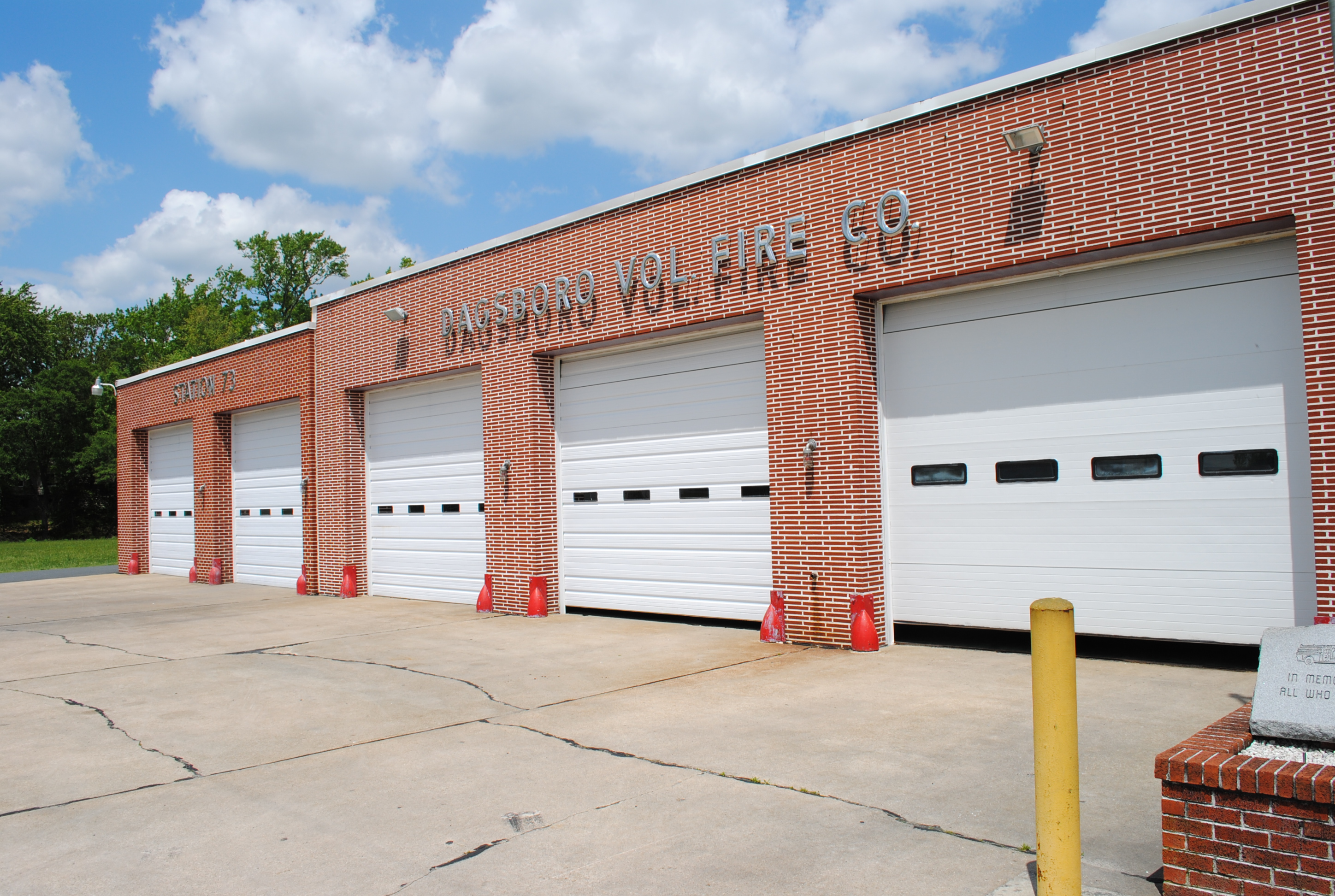

- Logo

- Location of Dagsboro in Sussex County, Delaware.

- Location within the state of Delaware Dagsboro (the United States)
- Coordinates: 38°32′57″N 75°14′45″W
- Country: United States
- State: Delaware
- County: Sussex

Area
  - Total: 1.44 sq mi (3.73 km^{2})
  - Land: 1.44 sq mi (3.73 km^{2})
  - Water: 0 sq mi (0.00 km^{2})
- Elevation: 26 ft (7.9 m)

Population (2020)
  - Total: 870
  - Density: 604.8/sq mi (233.52/km^{2})
- Time zone: UTC−5 (Eastern (EST))
  - Summer (DST): UTC−4 (EDT)
- ZIP code: 19939
- Area code: 302
- FIPS code: 10-18950
- GNIS feature ID: 213855
- Website: dagsboro.delaware.gov

Dagsboro is a town in Sussex County, Delaware, United States. As of the 2020 census, Dagsboro had a population of 870. It is part of the Salisbury, Maryland-Delaware Metropolitan Statistical Area.

== History ==
Dagsboro, incorporated in the early 1900s, is a town that is energized in summer by Delaware Route 26 beach traffic. The town, in the Indian River School District, was founded in 1747 and has been known as Blackfoot Town, Dagsbury and Dagsborough. It was named for John Dagworthy, a brigadier general of the Sussex County Militia during the American Revolutionary War.

== Geography ==
Dagsboro is located at 38°32′57″N 75°14′45″W (38.5492801, −75.2457443).

According to the United States Census Bureau, the town has a total area of 2.3 square miles (6.0 km^{2}), all land.

== Transportation ==
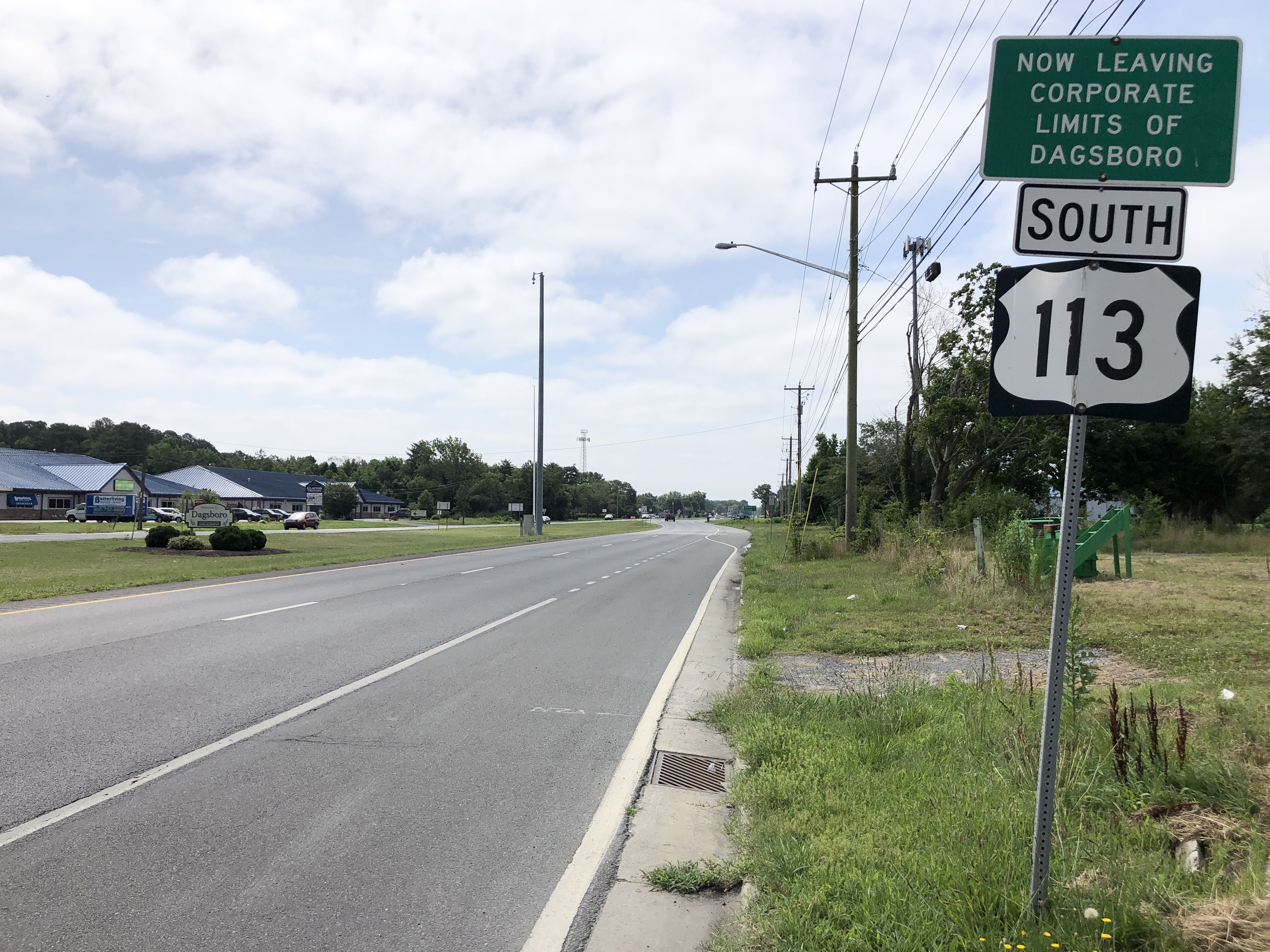
US 113 southbound in Dagsboro

Roads are the main method of travel to and from Dagsboro, and three state highways serve the town. U.S. Route 113 is the most significant of these, passing along the west edge of town on a north-south alignment. It connects northward to Georgetown and southward to Maryland. Delaware Route 20 and Delaware Route 26 also traverse the town, intersecting along Main Street in the center of town. DE 20 follows a west-northwest to east-southeast alignment, while DE 26 follows a more directly east-west alignment. Both roads connect to the coast as they head east, with DE 20 heading towards Fenwick Island and DE 26 traveling to Bethany Beach. The Delmarva Central Railroad's Dagsboro Industrial Track line passes north-south through Dagsboro.

== Demographics ==
Historical population
Census	Pop.	Note	%±
1880	58		—
1900	190		—
1910	176		−7.4%
1920	223		26.7%
1930	198		−11.2%
1940	222		12.1%
1950	474		113.5%
1960	477		0.6%
1970	375		−21.4%
1980	344		−8.3%
1990	398		15.7%
2000	519		30.4%
2010	805		55.1%
2020	870		8.1%
U.S. Decennial Census

At the 2010 census there were 805 people, 364 households, and 222 families living in the town. The population density was 409.5 inhabitants per square mile (158.1/km^{2}). There were 364 housing units at an average density of 195.7 per square mile (75.6/km^{2}). The racial makeup of the town was 85.6% White, 6.6% African American, 1% from American Indian, 4.2% from other races, and 2.6% from two or more races. Hispanic or Latino of any race were 8.7%.

Of the 364 households 31.8% had children under the age of 18 living with them, 52.1% were married couples living together, 13.2% had a female householder with no husband present, and 28.6% were non-families. 24.8% of households were one person and 28.6% were one person aged 65 or older. The average household size was 2.59 and the average family size was 2.98.

The age distribution was 22.4% under the age of 18, 9.6% from 18 to 24, 24.1% from 25 to 44, 28.9% from 45 to 64, and 15% 65 or older. The median age was 41.1 years. For every 100 females, there were 90.8 males. For every 100 females age 18 and over, there were 92.3 males.

The median household income was $49,167 and the median family income was $52,250. Males had a median income of $40,662 versus $32,000 for females. The per capita income for the town was $19,949. About 10.2% of families and 10.3% of the population were below the poverty line, including 13.6% of those under age 18 and 7.9% of those age 65 or over.

== Landmarks ==
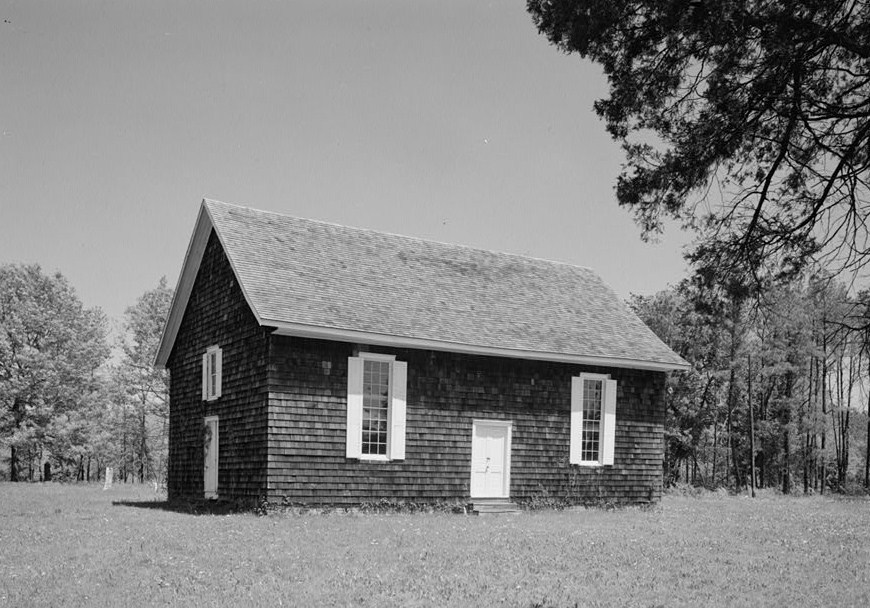
Prince George's Chapel

Built in 1755 and named for Prince George (later King George III), Prince George's Chapel is one of the oldest churches in the United States as well as one of the oldest buildings in Dagsboro. It became part of the Church of England's Worcester Parish on June 30, 1757, when the area was still part of Maryland. General Dagworthy, who died in 1829, is buried in the chapel's cemetery. Major renovations came in 1967 with the property's purchase by the State of Delaware. It was listed on the National Register of Historic Places in 1971.

Clayton Theatre opened in Dagsboro on February 2, 1949, with One Touch of Venus, a film featuring Ava Gardner, on its single screen. The theater was named for John M. Clayton, a former United States senator and Secretary of State. In the 1950s, a soda fountain operated as Clayton Cut Rate Luncheonette in a storefront adjoining the theater. Although the Clayton now uses digital projection equipment, it continues doing business as Delaware's last single-screen theater.

Dagsboro is the site of a new botanic garden, the Delaware Botanic Gardens, featuring a meadow designed by internationally known garden designer Piet Oudolf, which opened to the public in 2020.

== Education ==
Dagsboro is in the Indian River School District.

== Notable people ==
- John M. Clayton, Senator and U. S. Secretary of State
- Craig Conover, castmember, Southern Charm
- John Dagworthy, a military leader during the American Revolutionary War
- Alfred Wells, former US Congressman
- William H. Wells, former United States Senator and Secretary of State
