= List of numbered routes in Delaware =

Delaware State Route System
- Standard route shields

Highway names
- Interstates: Interstate X (I-X)
- US Highways: U.S. Route X (US X)
- State: Delaware Route X (DE X)

System links
- Delaware State Route System; List; Byways

The following is a list of numbered routes in Delaware, consisting of Interstate Highways, U.S. Routes, and state routes. The Delaware Department of Transportation is responsible for maintaining numbered roads in Delaware. State routes in Delaware use the circular highway shield. Delaware's numbering system mirrors that of U.S. Highways in that odd numbered highways travel north-south and even numbered routes go east-west. The numbers increase in value as one goes south and west respectively. There are some exceptions, however, mainly with routes from other states keeping their number as they enter Delaware, hence breaking the pattern.

== History ==
The first numbered routes in Delaware came in 1925 with the designation of the U.S. Highway System, in which US 13, US 40, and US 113 were legislated to run through the state. In 1930 and again in 1932, the Delaware State Highway Department recommended giving numbers to state roads to supplement the existing U.S. Highway System. By 1936, Delaware began assigning numbers to state routes. In 1956, the Interstate Highway System was created, with under 40 miles of Interstate highway legislated in New Castle County.

== Interstate Highways ==
Number	Length (mi)	Length (km)	Southern or western terminus	Northern or eastern terminus	Formed	Removed	Notes
I-95	23.43	37.71	I-95 at Maryland border near Newark	I-95 at Pennsylvania border near Claymont	1956	current	
I-295	5.71	9.19	I-95 / I-495 / US 202 at Newport	I-295 / US 40 at New Jersey border near Wilmington Manor	1959	current	
I-495	11.47	18.46	I-95 / I-295 / US 202 at Newport	I-95 / DE 92 at Claymont	1962	current	I-95 was routed along I-495 from 1979-1980 during a major reconstruction.
I-895	10.78	17.35	I-95 at Newport	I-95 at Claymont	1979	1980	Temporary designation for I-95 through Wilmington during a major reconstruction
Former; Proposed and unbuilt

== U.S. Highways ==
=== Mainline routes ===
Number	Length (mi)	Length (km)	Southern or western terminus	Northern or eastern terminus	Formed	Removed	Notes
US 9	31.04	49.95	US 13 at Laurel	Cape May–Lewes Ferry at Lewes	1974	current	Replaced DE 28 between Laurel and Georgetown and DE 18 between Georgetown and Five Points
US 13	103.33	166.29	US 13 at Maryland border at Delmar	US 13 at Pennsylvania border near Claymont	1926	current	
US 40	17.18	27.65	US 40 at Maryland border near Glasgow	I-295 / US 40 at New Jersey border near Wilmington Manor	1926	current	
US 113	37.26	59.96	US 113 at Maryland border at Selbyville	DE 1 near Milford	1926	current	Route truncated from Dover to Milford in 2004
US 122	6.15	9.90	US 13 at Wilmington	US 122 at Pennsylvania border near Brandywine	1926	1934	Replaced by US 202
US 202	12.65	20.36	US 13 / US 40 / DE 141 near New Castle Airport	US 202 at Pennsylvania border near Brandywine	1934	current	Replaced US 122
US 301	11.29	18.17	US 301 at Maryland border near Warwick, MD	DE 1 at Biddles Corner	1959	current	Four-lane freeway that is tolled.
US 301N	11.2	18.0	US 301 / DE 71 / DE 896 at Summit Bridge	US 13 / US 40 / US 301 at State Road	1959	1983	
US 301S	10.69	17.20	US 301 / DE 71 / DE 896 at Summit Bridge	US 13 / US 40 / US 301 at State Road	1959	1983	
Former; Proposed and unbuilt

=== Special routes ===
Number	Length (mi)	Length (km)	Southern or western terminus	Northern or eastern terminus	Formed	Removed	Notes
US 9 Bus.	3.36	5.41	US 9 / DE 1 / DE 404 at Nassau	US 9 at Lewes	1974	current	Replaced DE 18
US 9 Truck	6.1	9.8	US 9 / US 113 / DE 404 Truck at Georgetown	US 9 / DE 404 near Georgetown	1983	current	
US 13 Alt.	16.67	26.83	MD 455 at Delmar	US 13 near Seaford	1954	1957	Former alignment of US 13
US 13 Alt.	2.46	3.96	US 13 / DE 404 at Bridgeville	US 13 at Bridgeville	1957	1970	Former alignment of US 13. Replaced by US 13 Bus.
US 13 Alt.	5.69	9.16	US 13 / DE 15 near Canterbury	US 13 at Camden	1954	current	Former alignment of US 13
US 13 Alt.	3.86	6.21	US 13 at Rodney Village	US 13 at Dover	1959	current	Former alignment of US 13
US 13 Alt.	8.70	14.00	US 13 / US 202 at Wilmington	US 13 at Claymont	1939	1970	Replaced by US 13
US 13 Bus.	2.46	3.96	US 13 / DE 404 / DE 404 Bus. at Bridgeville	US 13 / DE 404 at Bridgeville	1970	current	Former alignment of US 13 and US 13 Alt.
US 13 Bus.	8.19	13.18	I-495 / US 13 at Wilmington	US 13 at Claymont	1970	current	Former alignment of US 13.
US 13 Byp.	8.19	13.18	US 13 near Claymont	US 13 Byp. at Pennsylvania border near Claymont	c. 1950	c. 1970	
US 113 Alt.	9.10	14.65	US 113 / DE 1 at Little Heaven	US 13 / US 113 at Dover	1936	2004	Former alignment of US 113 south of Dover
US 301 Truck	9.10	14.65	US 301 / DE 71 / DE 896 at Mount Pleasant	US 13 / US 40 / US 301 at State Road	—	2001	
Former

== State routes ==
Number	Length (mi)	Length (km)	Southern or western terminus	Northern or eastern terminus	Formed	Removed	Notes
DE 1	102.63	165.17	MD 528 at Fenwick Island	I-95 / DE 7 at Christiana	1974	current	Longest state route, extended past Milford in 1991, previously used alignment of US-13 between gaps in expressway north of Dover between 1991 and 2003
DE 1A	2.01	3.23	DE 1 at Dewey Beach	DE 1 at Rehoboth Beach	1974	current	Former DE 14A
DE 1B	0.75	1.21	DE 1 at Rehoboth Beach	DE 1A at Rehoboth Beach	1974	current	
DE 1D	3.92	6.31	DE 1 / DE 24 at Midway	DE 23 at Nassau	1996	current	
DE 1 Bus.	3.90	6.28	DE 1 near Milford	US 113 / DE 1 near Milford	1977	current	
DE 2	10.81	17.40	DE 72 / DE 273 near Newark	DE 52 at Wilmington	1936	current	Until 2013, continued west along DE-72, DE-4, and DE-279 to the Maryland line
DE 2 Bus.	2.91	4.68	DE 2 / DE 4 / DE 896 at Newark	DE 2 / DE 72 / DE 273 at Newark	1990	2013	
DE 3	6.15	9.90	I-495 at Edgemoor	DE 92 at Hanbys Corner	1968	current	
DE 4	14.08	22.66	DE 279 / DE 896 at Newark	DE 48 at Wilmington	1967	current	
DE 4	8.08	13.00	MD 299 near Warwick, MD	US 13 at Odessa	1938	1957	Replaced by DE 299
DE 5	19.49	31.37	River Road at Oak Orchard	DE 1 near Milton	1938	current	
DE 5 Alt.	3.8	6.1	DE 5 near Milton	DE 5 / DE 16 near Milton	1998	current	
DE 6	17.38	27.97	MD 291 near Blackiston	Delaware Avenue at Woodland Beach	1936	current	
DE 7	16.87	27.15	US 13 / DE 72 in Wrangle Hill	SR 3013 at Pennsylvania state line near Hockessin	1936	current	
DE 8	17.15	27.60	MD 454 at Marydel	DE 9 near Little Creek	1936	current	
DE 9	57.83	93.07	DE 1 near Dover Air Force Base	DE 2 at Wilmington	1936	current	
DE 9A	2.0	3.2	DE 9 at Wilmington	US 13 / DE 9 at Wilmington	1971	current	Official length is 0.78 miles (1.26 km) between DE 9 and Christiana Avenue
DE 9 Truck	5.7	9.2	DE 9 near Tybouts Corner	DE 9 / DE 141 / DE 273 at New Castle	—	—	
DE 10	16.12	25.94	MD 287 at Sandtown	DE 1 at Dover Air Force Base	1936	current	
DE 10 Alt.	9.23	14.85	DE 10 at Willow Grove	DE 10 at Highland Acres	1988	current	
DE 11	6.93	11.15	MD 302 near Templeville, MD	DE 300 near Kenton	1936	current	
DE 12	16.35	26.31	MD 314 in Whiteleysburg	DE 1 near Frederica	1936	current	
DE 14	19.47	31.33	MD 317 near Burrsville, MD	DE 1 near Milford	1936	current	Route truncated from Fenwick Island to Milford in 1977 and replaced with DE 1
DE 14A	2.01	3.23	DE 14 at Dewey Beach	DE 14 at Rehoboth Beach	1966	1977	Renumbered DE 1A
DE 14 Truck	3.9	6.3	DE 14 at Harrington	US 13 / DE 14 at Harrington	2008	current	
DE 15	57.05	91.81	DE 14 near Milford	DE 71 / DE 896 at Summit Bridge	1984	current	
DE 16	30.31	48.78	MD 16 near Hickman	Road end at Broadkill Beach	1936	current	
DE 17	8.30	13.36	DE 54 at Selbyville	DE 26 near Millville	1938	current	
DE 18	19.35	31.14	MD 318 near Federalsburg, MD	US 9 / DE 404 at Georgetown	1936	current	Route truncated from Lewes to Georgetown in 1974 and replaced with US 9 and US 9 Bus.
DE 20	40.29	64.84	MD 392 at Reliance	DE 54 near Fenwick Island	1936	current	
DE 22	21.39	34.42	Long Neck	DE 14 near Milton	1936	1938	Replaced by DE 5 between DE 24 and DE 14
DE 23	15.63	25.15	Road end at Long Neck	US 9 / DE 404 at Nassau	1994	current	
DE 24	40.42	65.05	MD 348 near Sharptown, MD	DE 1 at Midway	1936	current	
DE 24 Alt.	17.8	28.6	US 113 at Stockley	DE 24 at Midway	2006	current	
DE 26	22.96	36.95	DE / MD 54 / MD 353 near Gumboro	Road end at Bethany Beach	1936	current	
DE 28	12.79	20.58	US 13 at Laurel	DE 18 at Georgetown	1936	1974	Replaced by US 9
DE 30	22.63	36.42	DE 24 at Millsboro	DE 1 Bus. at Milford	1938	current	
DE 30	11.6	18.7	DE 20 in Seaford	DE 404 near Bridgeville	1936	1938	
DE 30 Alt.	0.74	1.19	DE 30 at Cedar Creek	DE 1 at Cedar Creek	1999	2017	
DE 32	38.59	62.10	MD 467 near Delmar	DE 14 at Fenwick Island	1968	1969	Replaced by DE 54
DE 34	3.30	5.31	Duncan Road near Prices Corner	DE 100 near Elsmere	1974	2019	
DE 36	23.28	37.47	DE 404 at Scotts Corner	Bay Avenue in Slaughter Beach	1938	current	
DE 37	3.11	5.01	DE 273 near Christiana	US 202 / DE 141 near New Castle Airport	1985	current	
DE 41	6.19	9.96	DE 2 / DE 62 at Prices Corner	PA 41 near Hockessin	1936	current	Originally continued to New Castle along DE-62 and DE-141. Cut back to end at DE-141 at DE-2 and in 2015 again to present end.
DE 42	12.74	20.50	DE 6 at Blackiston	DE 9 at Leipsic	1936	current	
DE 44	6.65	10.70	DE 300 at Everetts Corner	DE 8 at Pearsons Corner	1936	current	
DE 48	7.09	11.41	DE 41 at Hockessin	US 13 Bus. at Wilmington	1936	current	Once continued to ferry docks near Port of Wilmington and connected with NJ-48 via a ferry to Penns Grove
DE 52	7.87	12.67	US 13 Bus. at Wilmington	PA 52 near Centerville	1936	current	
DE 54	38.59	62.10	MD 54 near Delmar	DE 1 at Fenwick Island	1969	current	Portion of route runs concurrent with MD 54 on Maryland state line
DE 54 Alt.	8.6	13.8	DE 54 at Bunting	DE 26 at Bethany Beach	2006	current	
DE 58	3.86	6.21	DE 4 at Christiana	DE 273 near Hares Corner	1985	current	
DE 62	3.02	4.86	DE 2 / DE 41 at Prices Corner	Dead end at Newport	1981	current	
DE 71	21.99	35.39	US 13 near Townsend	US 13 / DE 1 at Tybouts Corner	1938	current	End point once followed path of US-301 to meet former MD-71
DE 72	17.42	28.03	DE 9 near Delaware City	DE 7 at Pike Creek	1942	current	
DE 82	5.49	8.84	DE 52 near Greenville	PA 82 near Yorklyn	1952	current	
DE 92	8.83	14.21	DE 100 near Montchanin	US 13 at Claymont	1968	current	
DE 100	8.99	14.47	DE 4 near Elsmere	SR 3100 near Montchanin	1938	current	Continued as PA-100 until 2003
DE 141	11.60	18.67	DE 9 / DE 273 at New Castle	US 202 / DE 261 near Fairfax	1952	current	
DE 202	1.01	1.63	US 13 Bus. at Wilmington	I-95 / US 202 at Wilmington	1981	current	Old alignment of US-202
DE 261	4.37	7.03	US 202 / DE 141 near Fairfax	PA 261 near Ways Corner	1938	current	
DE 273	12.66	20.37	MD 273 at Newark	DE 9 / DE 141 at New Castle	1936	current	
DE 279	1.05	1.69	MD 279 at Newark	DE 4 / DE 896 at Newark	2013	current	Former DE 2
DE 286	1.73	2.78	MD 286 near Chesapeake City, MD	DE 15 near Summit Bridge	1994	current	
DE 299	9.77	15.72	MD 282 near Warwick, MD	DE 9 at Mathews Corners	1957	current	Former DE 4, originally connected to MD-299 at Warwick
DE 300	11.83	19.04	MD 300 near Everetts Corner	US 13 / DE 6 at Smyrna	1936	current	
DE 404	35.22	56.68	MD 404 near Adams Crossroads	US 9 / DE 1 / US 9 Bus. at Nassau	1936	current	
DE 404 Alt.	4.65	7.48	DE 404 near Bridgeville	US 13 / DE 404 near Bridgeville	1990	1999	Replaced by DE 404
DE 404 Bus.	3.45	5.55	DE 404 near Bridgeville	US 13 / DE 404 near Bridgeville	1999	current	Former DE 404
DE 404 Truck	7.2	11.6	US 113 / DE 18 / DE 404 at Georgetown	US 9 / DE 404 at Georgetown	—	—	
DE 491	0.36	0.58	DE 92 near Claymont	PA 491 near Claymont	—	—	Shortest state route, only two signs posted along DE-92
DE 896	21.13	34.01	US 13 at Boyds Corner	MD 896 near Newark	1938	current	Once continued south on DE-71 to US-13 near Blackbird
DE 896 Alt.	11.0	17.7	US 13 / DE 896 at Boyds Corner	US 40 / US 301 / DE 896 at Glasgow	—	2012	Detour around Summit Bridge during construction, some signs still posted as of April 2016
DE 896 Bus.	1.78	2.86	DE 896 near Glasgow	DE 896 near Glasgow	1996	current	Northbound does not reconnect to DE-896, must use US-40 east
Former; Proposed and unbuilt
