= Delaware Route 5 =

State highway in Sussex County, Delaware, United States

Delaware Route 5

Route information
- Maintained by DelDOT
- Length: 19.49 mi (31.37 km)
- Existed: 1938–present
- Tourist routes: Delaware Bayshore Byway

Major junctions
- South end: River Road / Oak Orchard Avenue in Oak Orchard
- DE 24 in Oak Orchard; DE 23 in Long Neck; US 9 / DE 404 in Harbeson; DE 5 Alt. south of Milton; DE 16 / DE 5 Alt. in Milton
- North end: DE 1 north of Milton

Location
- Country: United States
- State: Delaware
- Counties: Sussex

Highway system
- Delaware State Route System; List; Byways
← DE 4	→ DE 6
← DE 20	DE 22	→ DE 23

Delaware Route 5 (DE 5) is a 19.49-mile-long (31.37 km) state highway in Sussex County, Delaware. The route runs from River Road and Oak Orchard Avenue on the Indian River Bay in Oak Orchard north to an intersection with DE 1 north of Milton. Along the way, DE 5 passes through rural areas along with the communities of Long Neck, Harbeson, and Milton. The route has concurrencies with DE 23 and DE 24 in the Long Neck area and crosses U.S. Route 9 (US 9)/DE 404 in Harbeson and DE 16 in Milton. DE 5 features one alternate route, DE 5 Alternate (DE 5 Alt.), which provides a bypass of Milton. DE 5 was built as a state highway in the 1920s and 1930s. The road between Long Neck and north of Milton, including present-day DE 5 north of DE 24, was designated as part of a short-lived DE 22 in the 1930s. DE 5 was designated to its current alignment by 1938. DE 5 Alt. was designated by 2001.

== Route description ==
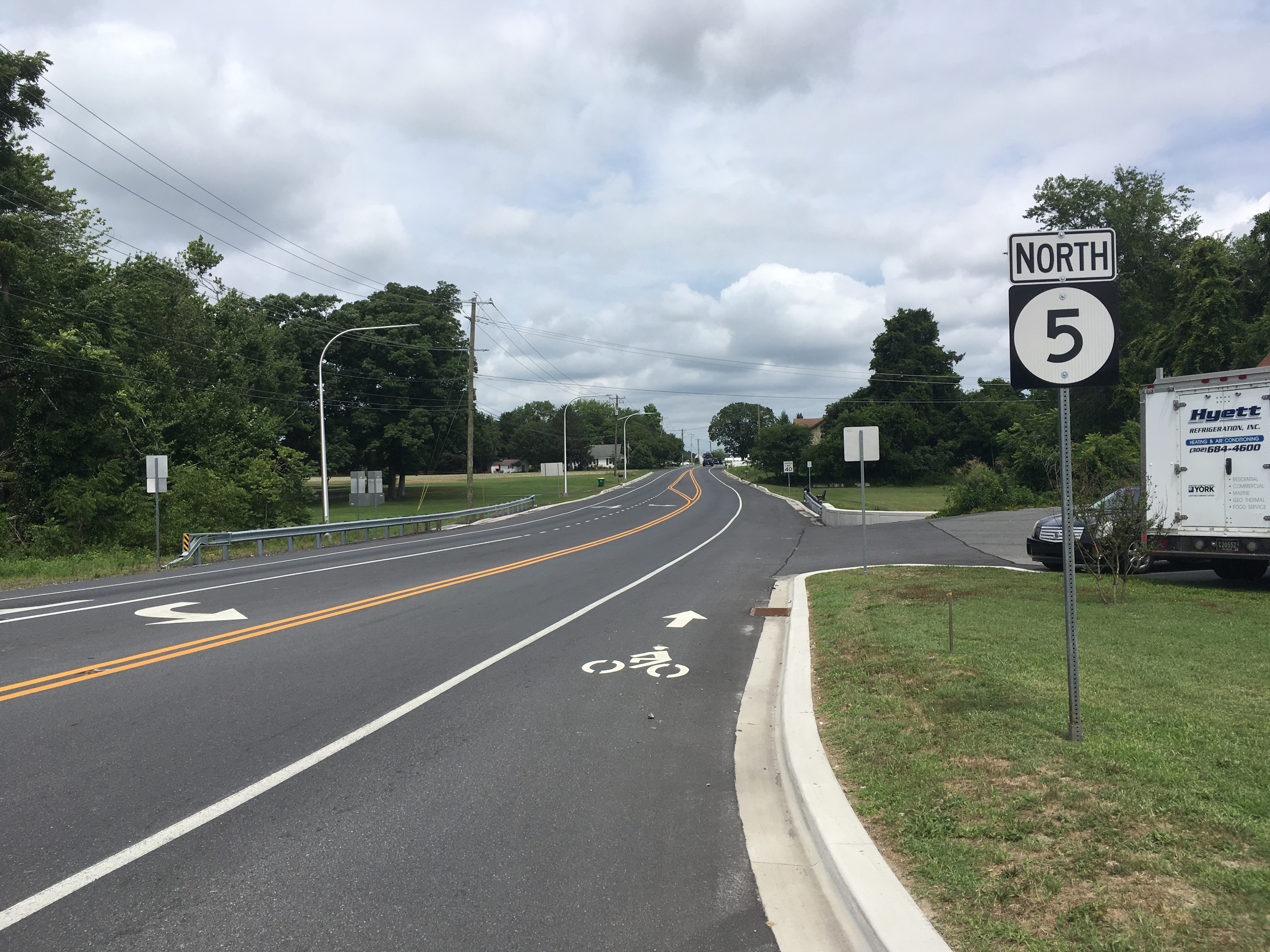
DE 5 northbound past US 9/DE 404 in Harbeson

DE 5 heads northwest on two-lane undivided Oak Orchard Road from the intersection with River Road and Oak Orchard Avenue on the northern shore of the Indian River Bay, passing through the residential areas of Oak Orchard. The road continues through a mix of farms and woods with some housing developments, passing northeast of the Nanticoke Indian Association's Nanticoke Indian Museum before coming to an intersection with DE 24. At this point, DE 5 turns northeast to form a concurrency with DE 24 on John J. Williams Highway. The road heads north through residential and commercial development with some fields as it enters the Long Neck area, where it intersects DE 23.

At the DE 23 intersection, DE 5 splits from DE 24 and turns northwest onto DE 23, which is called Indian Mission Road. The road crosses Guinea Creek and heads through a mix of farmland and woodland with some housing subdivisions, intersecting Harmons Hill Road/Phillips Branch Road. In Fairmount, DE 23 branches off to the northeast, and DE 5 continues to the northwest through more rural areas. At the intersection with DE 24 Alt. in Hollyville, the name changes to Harbeson Road. Farther northwest, the road comes to a junction with Anderson Corner Road/Forest Road. The route turns north and reaches Harbeson. In Harbeson, DE 5 heads past homes and crosses the Delmarva Central Railroad's Lewes Industrial Track line before it passes east of an Allen Harim Foods chicken plant and intersects US 9/DE 404 near businesses.

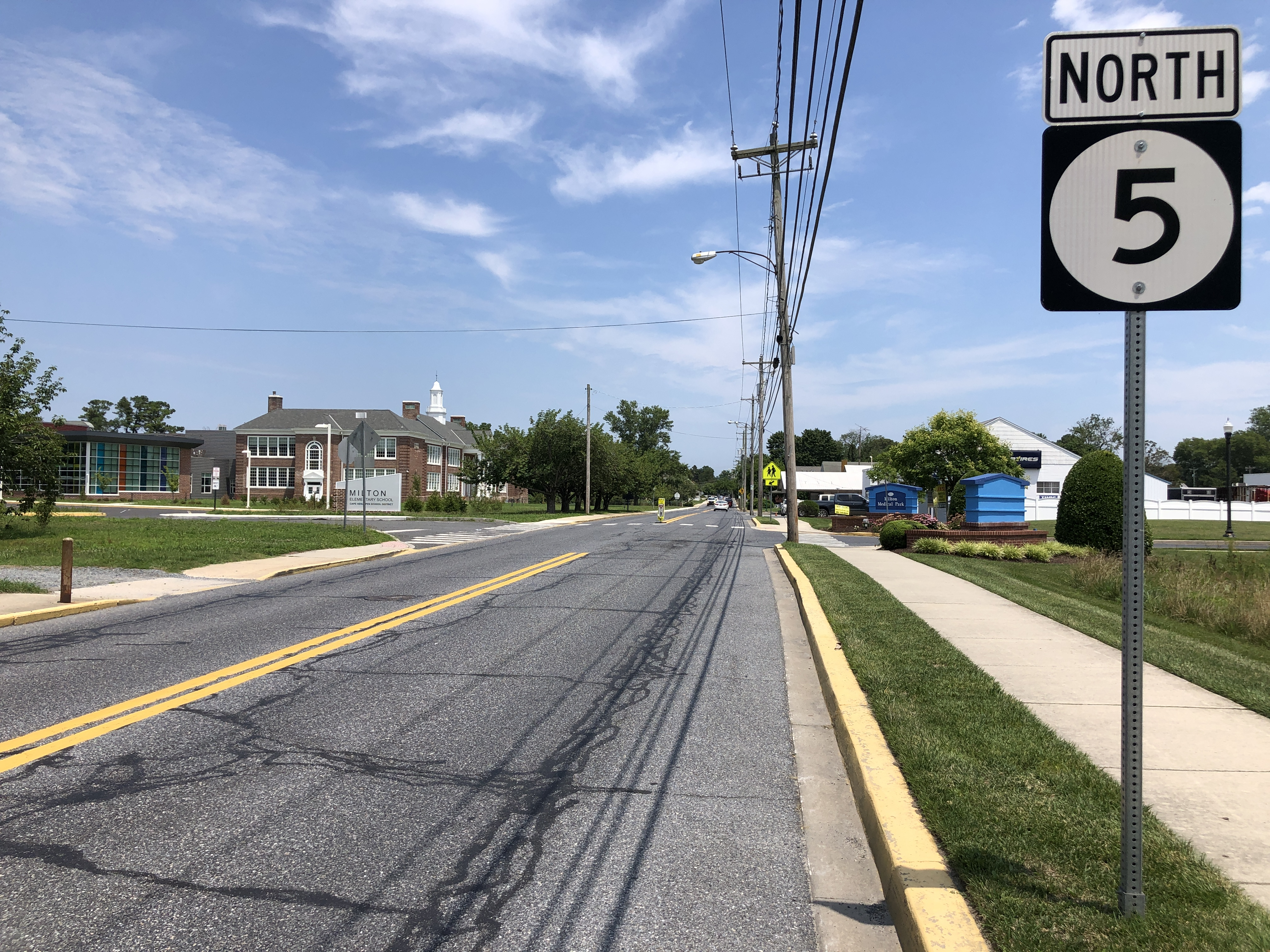
DE 5 northbound past DE 5 Alt. in Milton

Past this intersection, the road runs north through more rural land before curving northwest. Farther northwest, the route runs along the western border of the town of Milton as it passes west of residential development before reaching a junction with Shingle Point Road/Chestnut Street. The route turns north again and comes to an intersection with the southern terminus of the DE 5 Alt. bypass to the west of Milton, which heads west on Sand Hill Road. Also at this junction, the name changes from Harbeson Road to Federal Street. DE 5 continues northeast into Milton, crossing the Milton Rail-Trail and passing several homes. At the intersection with Front Street, the route turns northwest onto Union Street, running through the downtown and heading across the Broadkill River. The road continues through residential areas in the northern part of Milton. At the north end of town, DE 5 intersects DE 16 along with the northern terminus of DE 5 Alt., which heads west on DE 16. DE 5 continues north on Union Street Extended, passing through agricultural areas with some woods and homes. The route turns northeast and comes to its northern terminus at DE 1; this intersection has no access from northbound DE 1 to DE 5.

The section of DE 5 between the southern terminus and DE 16 serves as part of a primary hurricane evacuation route from the Oak Orchard and Long Neck areas to points inland while the section of DE 5 between DE 16 and DE 1 serves as part of a secondary hurricane evacuation route from the coastal areas. The section of the route between US 9/DE 404 in Harbeson and DE 16 in Milton is designated as part of the Delaware Bayshore Byway, a Delaware Byway and National Scenic Byway. DE 5 has an annual average daily traffic count ranging from a high of 19,031 vehicles at the intersection with DE 23 and DE 24 to a low of 2,260 vehicles at the south end of the DE 24 concurrency.

== History ==
Delaware Route 22
- Location: Long Neck–Milton
- Length: 21.39 mi (34.42 km)
- Existed: 1936–1938

By 1920, what is now DE 5 existed as an unimproved county road. The road was upgraded to a state highway between Harbeson and Milton by 1924. The following year, the road was proposed as a state highway north of Milton and from Oak Orchard to the present-day north end of the DE 24 concurrency. The entire length of the present DE 5 was completed as a state highway by 1931. DE 22 was designated in 1936 to run from Long Neck north to DE 14 (now DE 1) north of Milton. DE 5 was assigned to its current alignment by 1938, running between Oak Orchard and DE 14 north of Milton. DE 5 replaced DE 22 north of the DE 24 intersection while the former DE 22 south of there became unnumbered (now a part of DE 23). By 1994, DE 23 was designated to run concurrent with a portion of DE 5 in the Long Neck area.

== Major intersections ==
The entire route is in Sussex County.

Location	mi	km	Destinations	Notes
Oak Orchard	0.00	0.00	River Road / Oak Orchard Avenue	Southern terminus
Oak Orchard	1.99	3.20	DE 24 west (John J. Williams Highway) – Millsboro	South end of DE 24 overlap
Long Neck	3.57	5.75	DE 23 south (Long Neck Road) – Massey's Landing DE 24 east (John J. Williams Highway) – Rehoboth Beach	North end of DE 24 overlap; south end of DE 23 overlap
Long Neck	6.11	9.83	DE 23 north (Beaver Dam Road)	North end of DE 23 overlap
Hollyville	6.99	11.25	DE 24 Alt. (Hollyville Road/Hollymount Road) – Georgetown, Angola	
Harbeson	11.81	19.01	US 9 / DE 404 (Lewes Georgetown Highway) – Georgetown, Lewes	
Milton			DE 5 Alt. north (Sand Hill Road)	Southern terminus of DE 5 Alt.
Milton	17.02	27.39	DE 16 / DE 5 Alt. south (Milton Ellendale Highway/Broadkill Road) – Greenwood, Broadkill Beach	Northern terminus of DE 5 Alt.
	19.49	31.37	DE 1 (Coastal Highway) – Milford, Lewes	Northern terminus; no access from northbound DE 1 to DE 5
1.000 mi = 1.609 km; 1.000 km = 0.621 mi: Concurrency terminus; Incomplete access

== Delaware Route 5 Alternate ==
Delaware Route 5 Alternate
- Location: Milton
- Length: 3.8 mi (6.1 km)
- Existed: 1998–present
- Tourist routes: Delaware Bayshore Byway

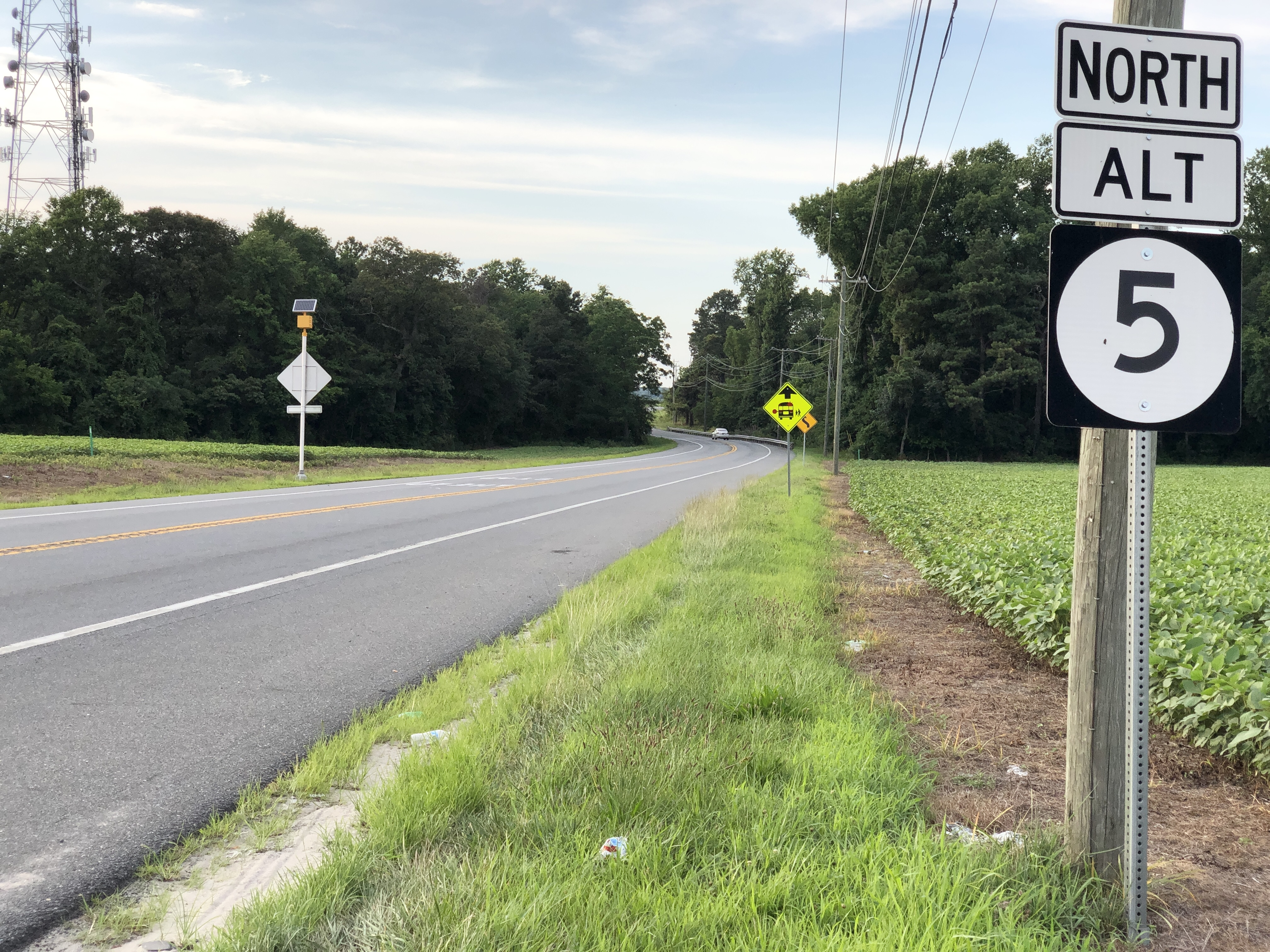
DE 5 Alt. northbound concurrent with DE 30 northbound near Milton

Delaware Route 5 Alternate (DE 5 Alt.) is a 3.8-mile-long (6.1 km) alternate route of DE 5 that bypasses the town of Milton. The route travels west from DE 5 south of Milton along two-lane undivided Sand Hill Road through areas of farms and woods with some homes. The route turns north to join DE 30 on Gravel Hill Road, crossing an abandoned railroad grade just east of the terminus of the Delmarva Central Railroad's Milton Industrial Track line. DE 5 Alt. splits from DE 30 by turning east onto DE 16, following that route through more rural areas on Milton Ellendale Highway. The route ends at an intersection with DE 5 north of Milton. In some locations, the route is signed as "DE 5 Truck Alt." The section of the route concurrent with DE 16 is designated as part of the Delaware Bayshore Byway, a Delaware Byway and National Scenic Byway.

The route was designated in 1998 as an alternate truck route bypassing the section of DE 5 in Milton. Despite this, the route was not suited as a truck bypass, and truck traffic continued to follow DE 5 through Milton. Construction of a truck bypass along the route of DE 5 Alt. was completed in 2005 in order to reduce truck traffic along DE 5 through Milton. This project made improvements to Sand Hill Road and DE 30 to upgrade the route to a truck bypass including intersection improvements at DE 5 and Sand Hill Road and DE 30 and Sand Hill Road, reconstructing Sand Hill Road, and replacing a bridge.

Major intersections

The entire route is in Milton, Sussex County.

mi	km	Destinations	Notes
0.0	0.0	DE 5 (Harbeson Road)	Southern terminus
1.3	2.1	DE 30 south (Gravel Hill Road)	South end of DE 30 overlap
2.4	3.9	DE 16 west (Milton Ellendale Highway) – Ellendale DE 30 north (Isaacs Road) – Milford	North end of DE 30 overlap; south end of DE 16 overlap
3.8	6.1	DE 5 (Union Street/Union Street Extended) – Milton DE 16 east (Broadkill Road)	Northern terminus
1.000 mi = 1.609 km; 1.000 km = 0.621 mi: Concurrency terminus
