= Delaware Route 404 =

State highway in Sussex County, Delaware, United States

Delaware Route 404

Route information
- Maintained by DelDOT
- Length: 35.22 mi (56.68 km)
- Existed: 1936–present
- Tourist routes: Delaware Bayshore Byway

Major junctions
- West end: MD 404 near Adams Crossroads
- DE 36 in Scotts Corner; US 13 in Bridgeville; DE 18 near Bridgeville; US 113 in Georgetown; US 9 in Georgetown; DE 30 in Gravel Hill; DE 5 in Harbeson; DE 1D / DE 23 in Nassau
- East end: US 9 / DE 1 / US 9 Bus. in Nassau

Location
- Country: United States
- State: Delaware
- Counties: Sussex

Highway system
- Delaware State Route System; List; Byways
← US 301	→ DE 491

Delaware Route 404 (DE 404) is a major state highway in Sussex County, Delaware that spans the east–west width of the state. DE 404's western terminus is at the Maryland border northwest of Bridgeville, where the road continues into that state as Maryland Route 404 (MD 404), and its eastern terminus is at the Five Points intersection with U.S. Route 9 (US 9), DE 1, and US 9 Business (US 9 Bus.) in Nassau. The route passes through rural areas as well as the towns of Bridgeville and Georgetown. DE 404 runs concurrent with DE 18 from east of Bridgeville to Georgetown and with US 9 from Georgetown to Five Points. DE 404 has a business route, DE 404 Bus., that passes through Bridgeville and a truck route, DE 404 Truck, that bypasses Georgetown. DE 404, along with MD 404, serves as a major route connecting the Chesapeake Bay Bridge and the Baltimore–Washington Metropolitan Area with the Delaware Beaches.

DE 404 was first designated by 1936 to run from the Maryland border to DE 18 southeast of Bridgeville. The route was extended east to Five Points by 1987. By 1999, DE 404 was realigned to bypass Bridgeville, with DE 404 Bus. designated on the former route through the town. The new alignment of DE 404 around Bridgeville replaced DE 404 Alternate (DE 404 Alt.), which was designated by 1990.

== Route description ==
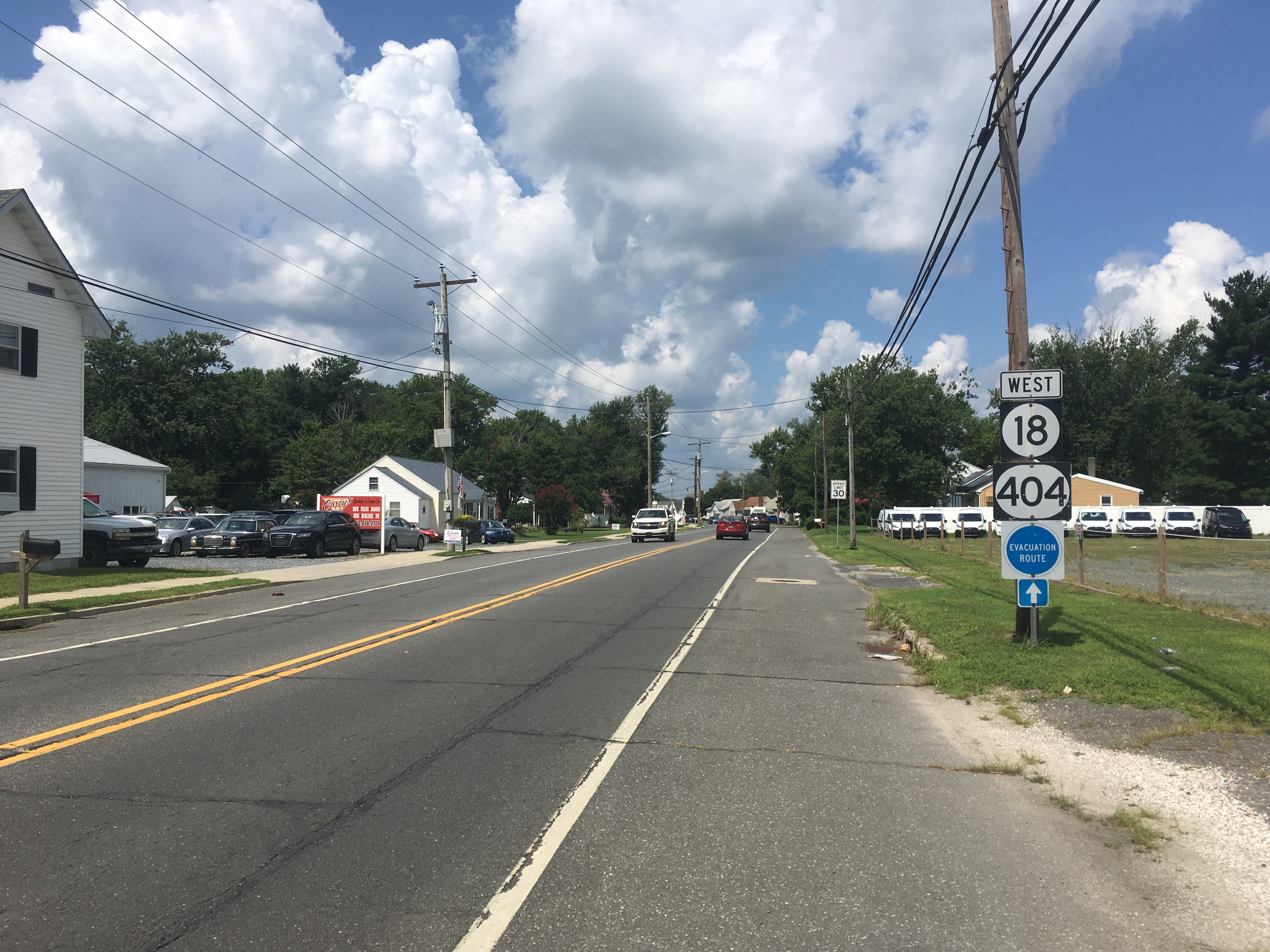
DE 18/DE 404 westbound in Georgetown

DE 404 begins at the Maryland border, where the road continues northwest into that state as MD 404. From the state line, the route heads southeast on two-lane undivided Seashore Highway, passing through a mix of farmland and woodland with some homes and businesses. DE 404 intersects Adamsville Road in the community of Adams Crossroads before it crosses the Marshyhope Creek. In the community of Scotts Corner, the road comes to a junction with the western terminus of DE 36. DE 404 continues through more rural areas and has an intersection with Dublin Hill Road. The route briefly becomes a divided highway before it turns northeast onto two-lane undivided Newton Road, with DE 404 Bus. continuing southeast along Seashore Highway toward the town of Bridgeville. From here, DE 404 heads through agricultural areas to the north of Bridgeville, curving east and crossing the Delmarva Central Railroad's Delmarva Subdivision line at-grade.

The route comes to an intersection with US 13 and turns south to form a concurrency with that route on Sussex Highway, a four-lane divided highway. A short distance later, US 13 Bus. splits off at an eastbound right-in/right-out intersection to head southwest into Bridgeville. The road crosses Redden Road and continues through farmland with some businesses to the east of Bridgeville. Upon reaching an intersection with US 13 Bus./DE 404 Bus., DE 404 splits from US 13 by heading southeast onto four-lane divided Seashore Highway. The road passes a few businesses before becoming two lanes and undivided as it continues through agricultural areas, coming to an intersection with DE 18.

At this point, DE 18 heads east concurrent with DE 404 along Seashore Highway through a mix of farmland and woodland with some residences and businesses. The road crosses the Nanticoke River and passes through tracts of the Redden State Forest, heading across Gravelly Branch to the south of Collins Pond and crossing Deep Creek further east. DE 18/DE 404 enters the town of Georgetown and becomes Bridgeville Road, running to the north of the Jack F. Owens Campus of Delaware Technical Community College. The road intersects US 113 and the western terminus of DE 404 Truck in a commercial area and continues east. The two routes head southeast onto North Bedford Street, passing homes and businesses. The road intersects US 9 at a traffic circle called The Circle in the center of Georgetown, where the Sussex County Courthouse is located. Here, DE 18 reaches its eastern terminus.

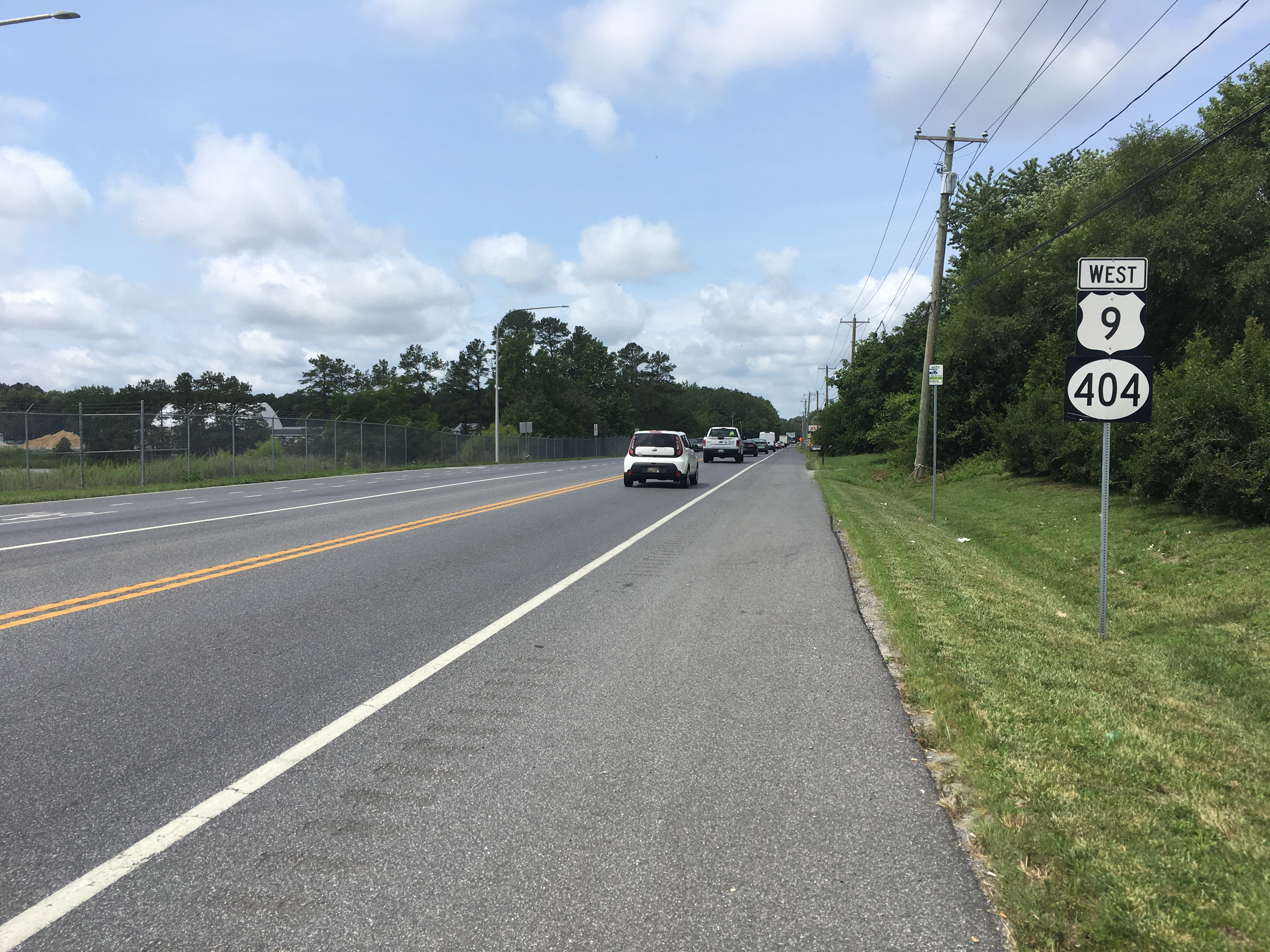
US 9/DE 404 westbound past DE 30 in Gravel Hill

At this point, DE 404 continues northeast concurrent with US 9 on East Market Street through the downtown area. The road crosses the Delmarva Central Railroad's Indian River Subdivision line at-grade and runs through residential areas with a few businesses, passing south of the Southern Delaware Tourism Visitors Center. The roadway briefly becomes a divided highway at the Sand Hill Road/Airport Road intersection. US 9/DE 404 heads east-northeast out of Georgetown and becomes Lewes Georgetown Highway, passing through farmland and woodland with some development. The two routes intersect the eastern terminus of US 9 Truck/DE 404 Truck a short distance east of Georgetown. In the community of Gravel Hill, the road crosses DE 30. Following this intersection, US 9/DE 404 passes through more rural land, reaching a junction with DE 5 near businesses in the community of Harbeson. Past here, the two routes cross an abandoned railroad line at the Cool Spring Road intersection in the community of Cool Spring. Farther east, residential development near the road begins to increase, with the road passing through the community of Belltown. Upon reaching the area of the Five Points intersection in the community of Nassau, US 9/DE 404 runs past homes and businesses, widening into a divided highway and coming to an intersection with DE 1D/DE 23. US 9/DE 404 runs along a four-lane divided highway before the road comes to a junction with DE 1. Here, DE 404 ends, US 9 Bus. continues northeast, and US 9 heads east for a concurrency with DE 1. At this intersection, access from eastbound DE 404 to northbound DE 1 is provided by a reverse jughandle.

DE 404 serves as part of a major route connecting the Chesapeake Bay Bridge and the Baltimore–Washington Metropolitan Area to the Delaware Beaches. DE 404 also serves as part of a primary hurricane evacuation route from the Delaware Beaches to points inland. The section of the route between DE 5 in Harbeson and DE 1 in Five Points is designated as part of the Delaware Bayshore Byway, a Delaware Byway and National Scenic Byway. The highest annual average daily traffic along DE 404 is 22,186 vehicles along the US 13 concurrency with the lowest being 4,860 vehicles at the western terminus of DE 404 Bus. All of DE 404 is part of the National Highway System, a network of roads important to the country's economy, defense, and mobility.

== History ==
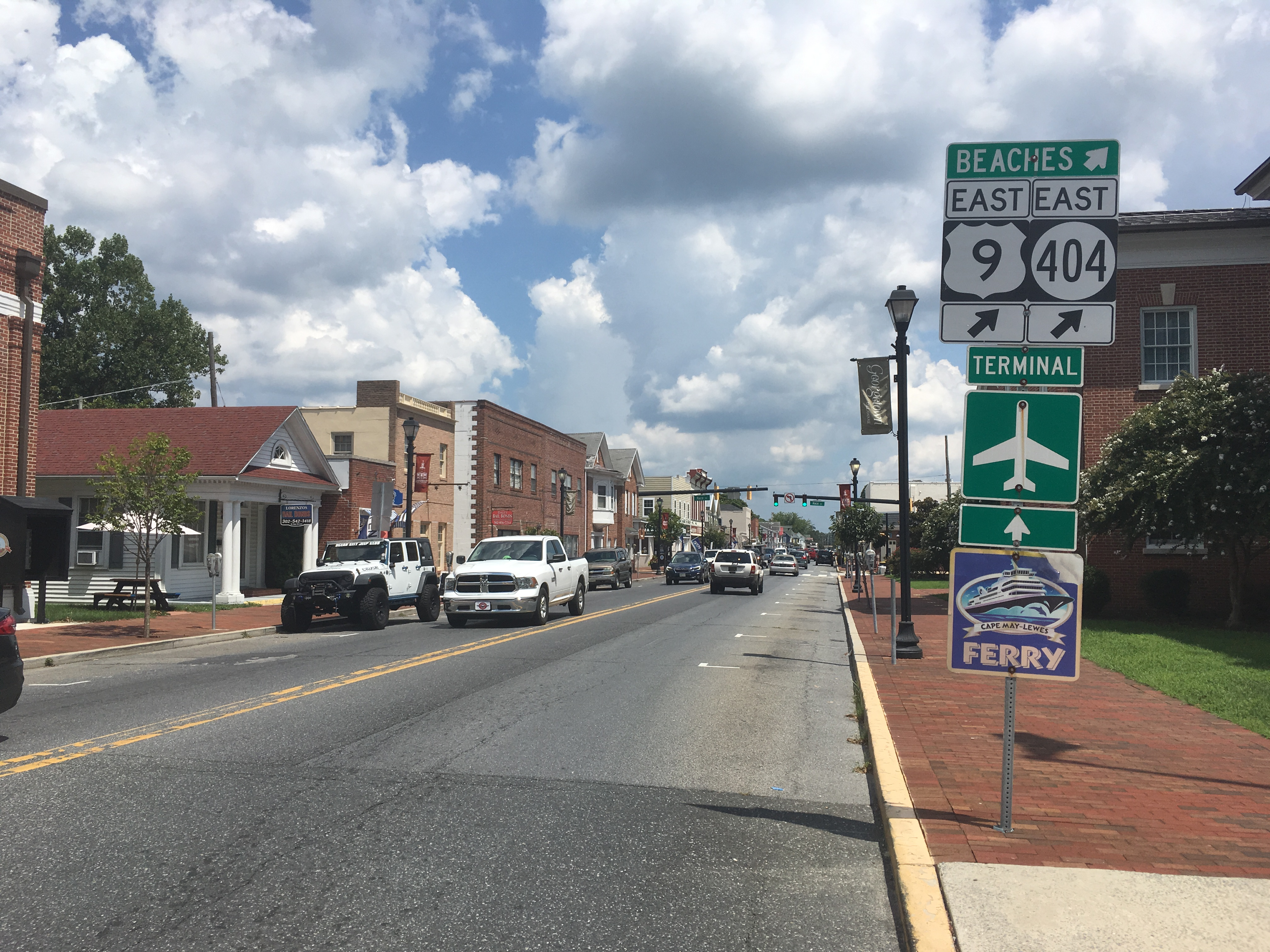
US 9/DE 404 eastbound past The Circle in Georgetown, where DE 18 ends and DE 404 joins US 9

By 1920, what would originally become DE 404 was an unimproved county road, with the section east of Bridgeville under contract as a state highway. The entire route of what would become DE 404 was completed as a state highway to a point northwest of Bridgeville by 1924. By 1931, the road was built as a state highway northwest to the Maryland border. DE 404 was designated to run from the Maryland border, where it connected to MD 404, southeast to DE 18 southeast of Bridgeville by 1936. The route followed its current alignment to Bridgeville, where it passed through the town on Market Street and South Main Street before picking up its current alignment east of US 13. At this time, what is now DE 404 past its then-eastern terminus was designated as part of DE 18. By 1987, DE 404 was extended east to DE 1 in Five Points, following DE 18 to Georgetown and US 9 (which had replaced a portion of DE 18) from Georgetown to Five Points. DE 404 Alt. was created to bypass Bridgeville to the north and east by 1990, following Newton Road and US 13. The alternate route became a part of mainline DE 404 by 1999, with the former alignment of DE 404 through Bridgeville designated DE 404 Bus.

DE 404 saw increased traffic levels in the summer months due to people traveling to the Delaware Beaches, which has led to traffic congestion and safety concerns. A traffic study on increasing congestion along east–west roads in Sussex County, including DE 404, was undertaken in 1986 in coordination with Maryland officials. In 1988, plans were made for a consultant to design road improvements for an east–west corridor between Bridgeville and the Lewes area. The Delaware Department of Transportation (DelDOT) undertook the Sussex East-West Corridor Study, which was published in 1992, to study road improvements to the DE 404 corridor. The study included different proposed alignments and plans for bypasses of Bridgeville and Georgetown. As part of this study, a survey of historic properties within the proposed path of the roadway was undertaken. In 2004, plans for a new roadway along the DE 404 corridor resurfaced when the House Transportation Committee of the Delaware House of Representatives called for DelDOT to conduct a feasibility study on constructing a new roadway. State Representative Gerald Hocker and State Senator George Bunting sponsored a resolution that would address increasing traffic in Sussex County. In 2019, DelDOT began the Coastal Corridors Study to study east–west traffic patterns on roads in northern Sussex County including DE 404. The study is intended to develop long-term road improvements along the corridor. In March 2021, five virtual workshops on the study were held to present collected data and gather input from the public.

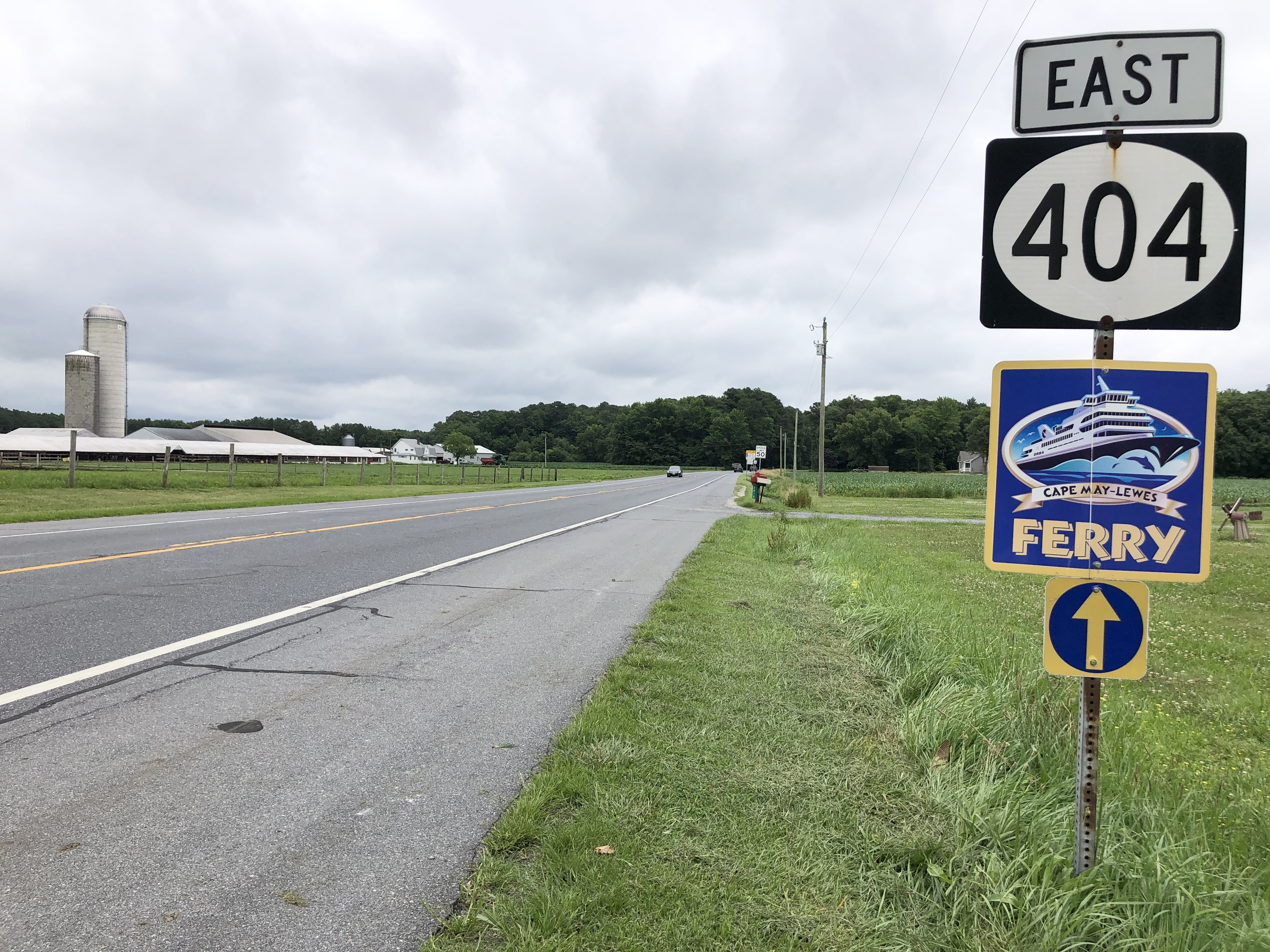
DE 404 eastbound past its western terminus at MD 404 at the Maryland border near Adams Crossroads

In 1991, the Five Points intersection was reconfigured to separate the DE 23 and Plantation Road intersection from US 9/DE 404, with a short connector road linking US 9/DE 404 to the two roads. In addition, a jughandle was constructed from eastbound US 9/DE 404 to northbound DE 1. In 2004, DelDOT began a study on converting the Five Points intersection into an interchange in addition to developing plans on widening US 9/DE 404 west of the Five Points intersection. Alternatives for these projects were presented at public workshops between 2004 and 2008, although the projects were cancelled due to lack of support and financial limitations.

In June 2007, a $15 million project began that realigned the intersection between US 13 and DE 404/US 13 Bus./DE 404 Bus. in Bridgeville from a skewed intersection to a perpendicular intersection and built service roads on both sides of US 13. The project was intended to improve safety at the intersection, which saw a high accident rate due to its design. Work on the project was completed on May 21, 2009, with DelDOT secretary Carolann Wicks and President of Commissioners for the Town of Bridgeville William Jefferson in attendance at a ceremony.

On January 25, 2021, construction began to realign Airport Road and Sand Hill Road at their intersection with US 9/DE 404 east of Georgetown as part of a larger project to create an eastern gateway into Georgetown. Construction was expected to be completed in April 2021.

In 2022, construction began to reconfigure the intersection between US 9/DE 404 and DE 1D/DE 23 that would realign DE 1D and DE 23 to meet at a roundabout and intersect a longer connector road linking to US 9/DE 404 and also build a direct ramp from southbound DE 1 to US 9/DE 404 at the DE 1D/DE 23 intersection. The connector to DE 1D/DE 23 and the ramp from southbound DE 1 opened on May 16, 2024. An interchange is planned with US 113 as part of improving that highway. The proposed interchange at US 113 is currently in the design phase, with construction expected to begin in 2024.

== Major intersections ==
The entire route is in Sussex County.

Location	mi	km	Destinations	Notes
	0.00	0.00	MD 404 west (Shore Highway) – Denton, Bay Bridge	Maryland state line; western terminus
Scotts Corner	3.23	5.20	DE 36 east (Scotts Store Road) to DE 16 – Greenwood	Western terminus of DE 36
Bridgeville	6.08	9.78	DE 404 Bus. east (Seashore Highway)	Western terminus of DE 404 Bus.
Bridgeville	8.22	13.23	US 13 north (Sussex Highway) – Dover	West end of US 13 overlap
Bridgeville			US 13 Bus. south (North Main Street) – Bridgeville Historic District	Right-in/right-out intersection eastbound; northern terminus of US 13 Bus.
Bridgeville	10.72	17.25	US 13 south (Sussex Highway) – Seaford, Maryland Beaches US 13 Bus. north / DE 404 Bus. west (South Main Street) – Bridgeville	East end of US 13 overlap; southern terminus of US 13 Bus.; eastern terminus of DE 404 Bus.
	12.37	19.91	DE 18 west (Cannon Road) – Federalsburg	West end of DE 18 overlap
Georgetown	21.64	34.83	US 113 (Dupont Boulevard / DE 404 Truck east) – Milford, Millsboro, Beaches	Western terminus of DE 404 Truck
Georgetown	22.69	36.52	US 9 west (West Market Street) to US 113 – Laurel DE 18 ends	Traffic circle; eastern terminus of DE 18; west end of US 9 overlap
Georgetown			US 9 Truck west / DE 404 Truck west (Park Avenue) to US 113	Eastern terminus of US 9 Truck/DE 404 Truck
Gravel Hill			DE 30 (Gravel Hill Road) – Milton, Millsboro	
Harbeson	28.71	46.20	DE 5 (Harbeson Road) – Milton, Harbeson, Oak Orchard	
Nassau	35.08	56.46	DE 1D south (Plantation Road) / DE 23 south (Beaver Dam Road)	Northern terminus of DE 23
Nassau	35.22	56.68	US 9 east / DE 1 (Coastal Highway) – Rehoboth Beach US 9 Bus. east (Savannah Road) – Lewes	Eastern terminus; western terminus of US 9 Bus.
1.000 mi = 1.609 km; 1.000 km = 0.621 mi: Concurrency terminus; Incomplete access

== Special routes ==
=== DE 404 Business ===
Delaware Route 404 Business
- Location: Bridgeville
- Length: 3.45 mi (5.55 km)
- Existed: 1999–present

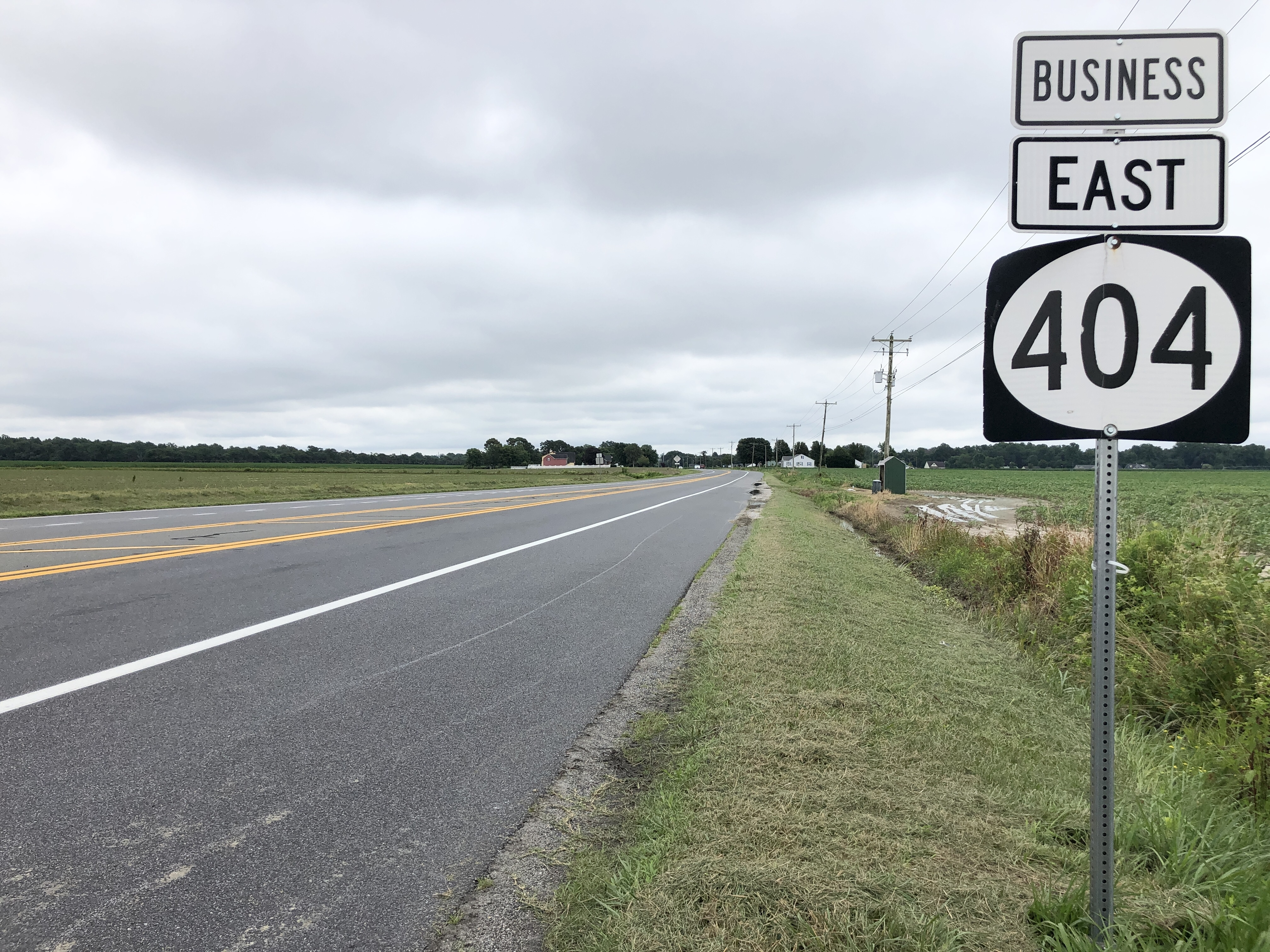
DE 404 Bus. eastbound past DE 404 northwest of Bridgeville

Delaware Route 404 Business (DE 404 Bus.) is a 3.45-mile (5.55 km) long business route of DE 404 that runs through the town of Bridgeville. The route begins at DE 404 northwest of Bridgeville, heading southeast on two-lane undivided Seashore Highway through agricultural areas with some homes. DE 404 Bus. enters Bridgeville and heads through commercial areas, briefly becoming a divided highway before it intersects Federalsburg Road. At this junction, the business route turns northeast onto two-lane undivided Market Street and crosses the Delmarva Central Railroad's Delmarva Subdivision line at-grade. The route passes several homes before intersecting US 13 Bus. and turning south to join that route on South Main Street. The two routes run through more residential areas before leaving Bridgeville and heading through farmland with some development. The road widens into a four-lane divided highway and heads into a commercial area, intersecting US 13 and DE 404. At this point US 13 Bus. and DE 404 Bus. both end, with the road continuing southeast as DE 404. The highest annual average daily traffic along DE 404 Bus. is 7,797 vehicles at the eastern terminus at US 13 and DE 404 with the lowest being 5,344 vehicles at the western border of Bridgeville. DE 404 Bus. was created in 1999 when DE 404 was rerouted to bypass Bridgeville on the alignment of DE 404 Alt. Between June 2007 and May 2009, the intersection with US 13 and DE 404 at the eastern terminus was realigned from a skewed intersection to a perpendicular intersection.

Major intersections
The entire route is in Bridgeville, Sussex County.

mi	km	Destinations	Notes
0.00	0.00	DE 404 (Seashore Highway/Newton Road)	Western terminus
1.84	2.96	US 13 Bus. north (North Main Street)	West end of US 13 Bus. overlap
3.45	5.55	US 13 / DE 404 west (Sussex Highway) – Seaford, Fenwick Island DE 404 east (Seashore Highway) – Georgetown, Beaches US 13 Bus. ends	Eastern terminus; southern terminus of US 13 Bus.
1.000 mi = 1.609 km; 1.000 km = 0.621 mi: Concurrency terminus

=== DE 404 Truck ===
Delaware Route 404 Truck
- Location: Georgetown
- Length: 7.2 mi (11.6 km)

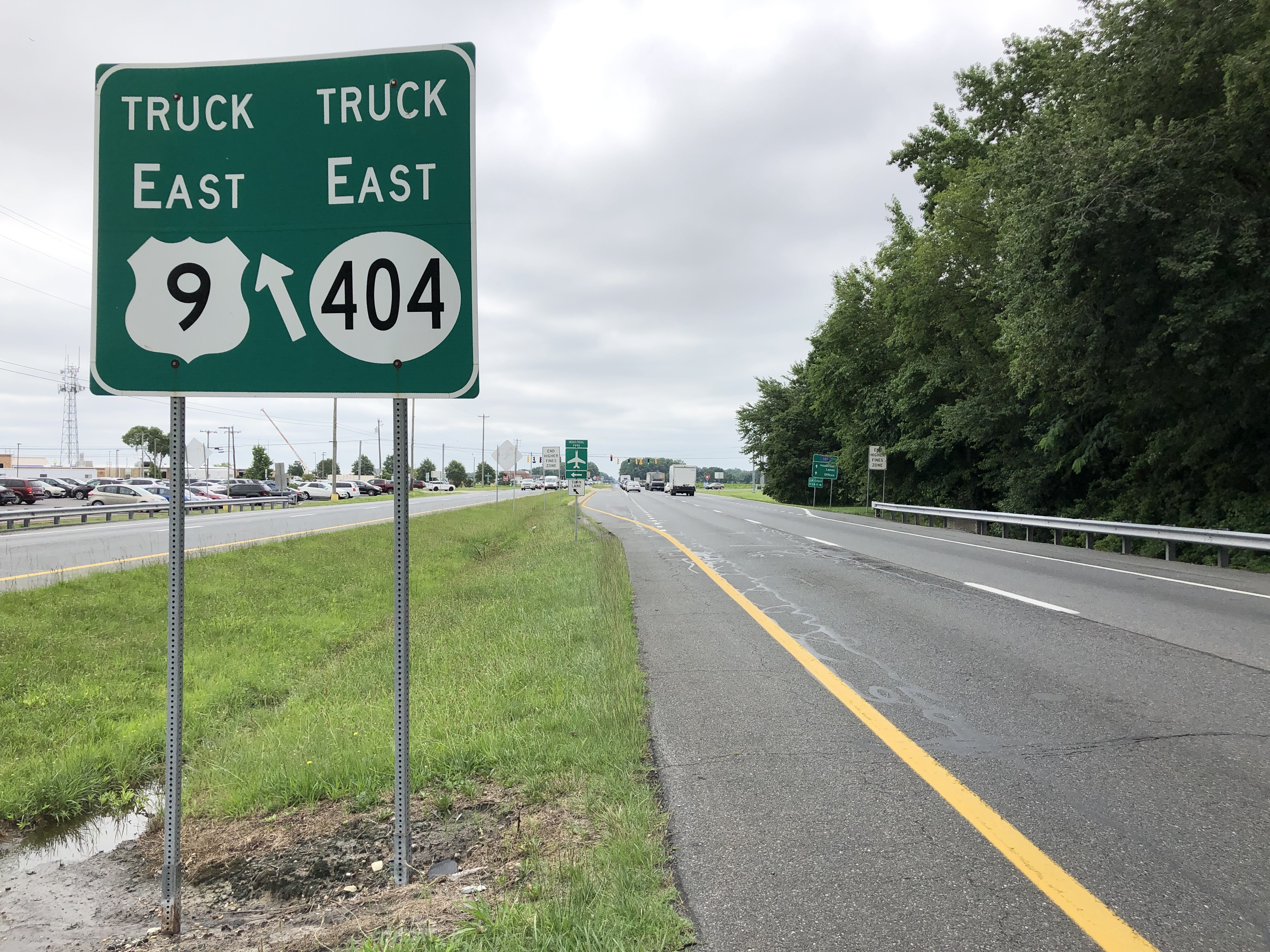
US 9 Truck/DE 404 Truck eastbound approaching split from southbound US 113 south of Georgetown prior to 2024 realignment

Delaware Route 404 Truck (DE 404 Truck) is a truck bypass of the section of DE 404 through the town of Georgetown. The route begins at the intersection between US 113 and DE 18/DE 404, heading south along with US 113 on four-lane divided Dupont Boulevard. The road passes through commercial areas with some farmland, reaching an intersection with US 9. At this point, US 113/DE 404 Truck becomes concurrent with US 9 Truck. The road heads southeast through woodland with some farm fields and businesses. US 9 Truck/DE 404 Truck split from US 113 by heading east-northeast on two-lane undivided Arrow Safety Road. The road passes through a mix of farmland and woodland with some development, coming to a roundabout with South Bedford Street, where the name changes to Park Avenue. The routes continue east before curving to the northeast, crossing the Delmarva Central Railroad's Indian River Subdivision line at-grade. The road turns east and passes to the south of Delaware Coastal Airport, where it makes a curve to the north. US 9 Truck/DE 404 Truck head through a mix of farmland and woodland with some homes to the east of the airport, crossing the Delmarva Central Railroad's Lewes Industrial Track line at-grade before ending at US 9/DE 404 east of Georgetown.

Major intersections
The entire route is in Georgetown, Sussex County.

mi	km	Destinations	Notes
0.00	0.00	US 113 north (Dupont Boulevard); DE 18 / DE 404 (Seashore Highway/Bridgeville Road) – Bridgeville, Bay Bridge, Georgetown	Western terminus; west end of US 113 overlap
1.16	1.87	US 9 (County Seat Highway/West Market Street) – Laurel, Seaford, Georgetown, Lewes US 9 Truck begins	West end of US 9 Truck overlap; western terminus of US 9 Truck
2.71	4.36	US 113 south (Dupont Boulevard)	East end of US 113 overlap
7.2	11.6	US 9 / DE 404 (Lewes Georgetown Highway) US 9 Truck ends	Eastern terminus; eastern terminus of US 9 Truck
1.000 mi = 1.609 km; 1.000 km = 0.621 mi: Concurrency terminus

=== Former DE 404 Alternate ===
Delaware Route 404 Alternate
- Location: Bridgeville
- Length: 4.65 mi (7.48 km)
- Existed: 1990–1999

Delaware Route 404 Alternate (DE 404 Alt.) was a 4.65-mile (7.48 km) alternate route of DE 404 that bypassed the town of Bridgeville. It ran to the north of Bridgeville on Newton Road and to the east of Bridgeville on US 13. The route was created by 1990. The alignment of DE 404 Alt. was replaced by DE 404 in 1999. The route of DE 404 in Bridgeville then became known as DE 404 Bus.

Major intersections
The entire route was in Bridgeville, Sussex County.

mi	km	Destinations	Notes
0.00	0.00	DE 404 (Seashore Highway)	Western terminus
2.14	3.44	US 13 north (Sussex Highway) – Dover	West end of US 13 overlap
		US 13 Bus. south (North Main Street) – Bridgeville Historic District	Right-in/right-out intersection eastbound; northern terminus of US 13 Bus.
4.65	7.48	US 13 south (Sussex Highway) – Seaford US 13 Bus. north / DE 404 (South Main Street/Seashore Highway) – Georgetown, Lewes, Rehoboth Beach, Shore Points	Eastern terminus; southern terminus of US 13 Bus.
1.000 mi = 1.609 km; 1.000 km = 0.621 mi: Concurrency terminus; Incomplete access
