= Delaware Route 23 =

State highway in Sussex County, Delaware, United States

Delaware Route 23

Route information
- Maintained by DelDOT
- Length: 15.63 mi (25.15 km)
- Existed: 1994–present

Major junctions
- South end: Dead end in Long Neck
- DE 5 / DE 24 in Long Neck; DE 5 in Fairmount; DE 1D in Nassau
- North end: US 9 / DE 404 in Nassau

Location
- Country: United States
- State: Delaware
- Counties: Sussex

Highway system
- Delaware State Route System; List; Byways
← DE 22	→ DE 24

Delaware Route 23 (DE 23) is a 15.63-mile-long (25.15 km) state highway in Sussex County, Delaware. Its southern terminus is at Massey's Landing in Long Neck, near the confluence of Rehoboth Bay and Indian River Bay and its northern terminus is at the Five Points intersection in Nassau, where it ends at U.S. Route 9 (US 9)/DE 404. From the southern terminus, the route runs west through residential areas of Long Neck before heading north through rural areas with some development. DE 23 is concurrent with DE 5 between the DE 24 intersection in Long Neck and Fairmount. It is also concurrent with DE 24 Alternate (DE 24 Alt.) between Hollymount and the DE 1D intersection in Five Points. The road was designated as part of DE 22 south of Fairmount for a short time in the 1930s, with DE 5 designated along the stretch between DE 24 and Fairmount by 1938; the remainder of the road was unnumbered. The road was fully paved by 1970. The DE 23 designation was assigned by 1994.

== Route description ==
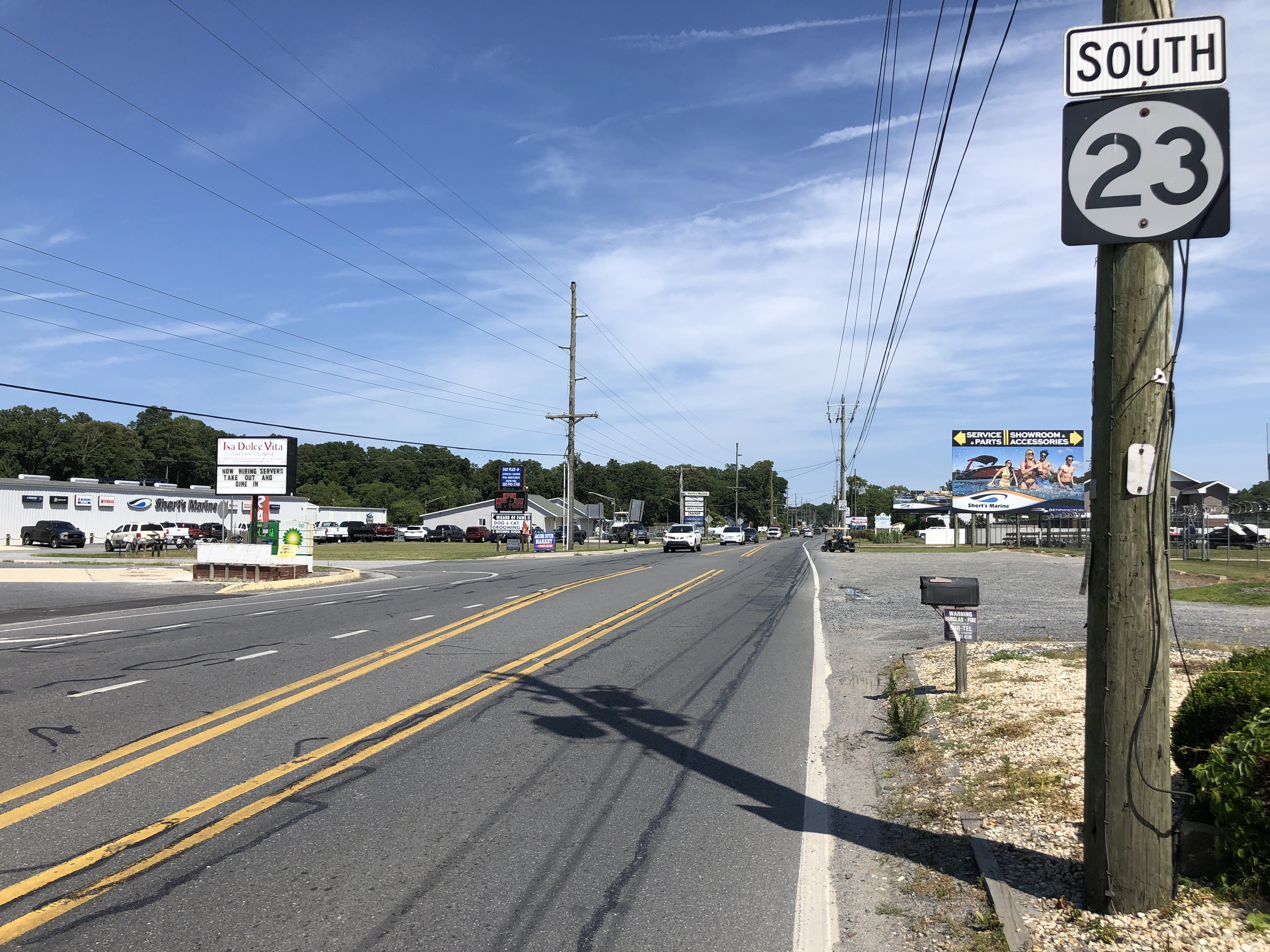
DE 23 southbound in Long Neck

DE 23 begins at a boat ramp parking lot at Massey's Landing in Long Neck, near the confluence of the Rehoboth Bay and the Indian River Bay. From here, the route heads west on two-lane undivided Long Neck Road through a mix of residential areas and marshland between Rehoboth Bay to the north and Indian River Bay to the south. The road winds west through homes, commercial development, and a few farms, passing south of the Baywood Greens golf course. Farther west, DE 23 comes to an intersection with DE 5/DE 24. At this intersection, the name changes to Indian Mission Road, and DE 23 begins a concurrency with DE 5. The two routes head northwest and cross Guinea Creek, passing through a mix of farmland and woodland with some housing subdivisions, intersecting Harmons Hill Road/Phillips Branch Road.

In Fairmount, DE 5 splits to the northwest and DE 23 continues north on Beaver Dam Road. In Hollymount, DE 23 intersects DE 24 Alt. and forms a concurrency with that route. The road comes to a roundabout with Quiet Harbor Way at the entrance to the Anchors Run housing development before curving northeast and crossing Bundicks Branch. Upon reaching the Five Points intersection in the community of Nassau, DE 23 intersects DE 1D at a roundabout and turns to the north, with DE 1D/DE 24 Alt. continuing straight and curving to the southeast. A short distance later, DE 23 reaches its northern terminus at US 9/DE 404 just west of where those routes intersect DE 1. A ramp from southbound DE 1 intersects US 9/DE 404 opposite the northern terminus of DE 23.

The section of DE 23 between the southern terminus and the north end of the DE 5 concurrency serves as part of a primary hurricane evacuation route from the Long Neck area to points inland. The route has an annual average daily traffic count ranging from a high of 20,022 vehicles at the northern terminus at US 9/DE 404 to a low of 2,044 vehicles at the south end of the DE 24 Alt. concurrency.

== History ==
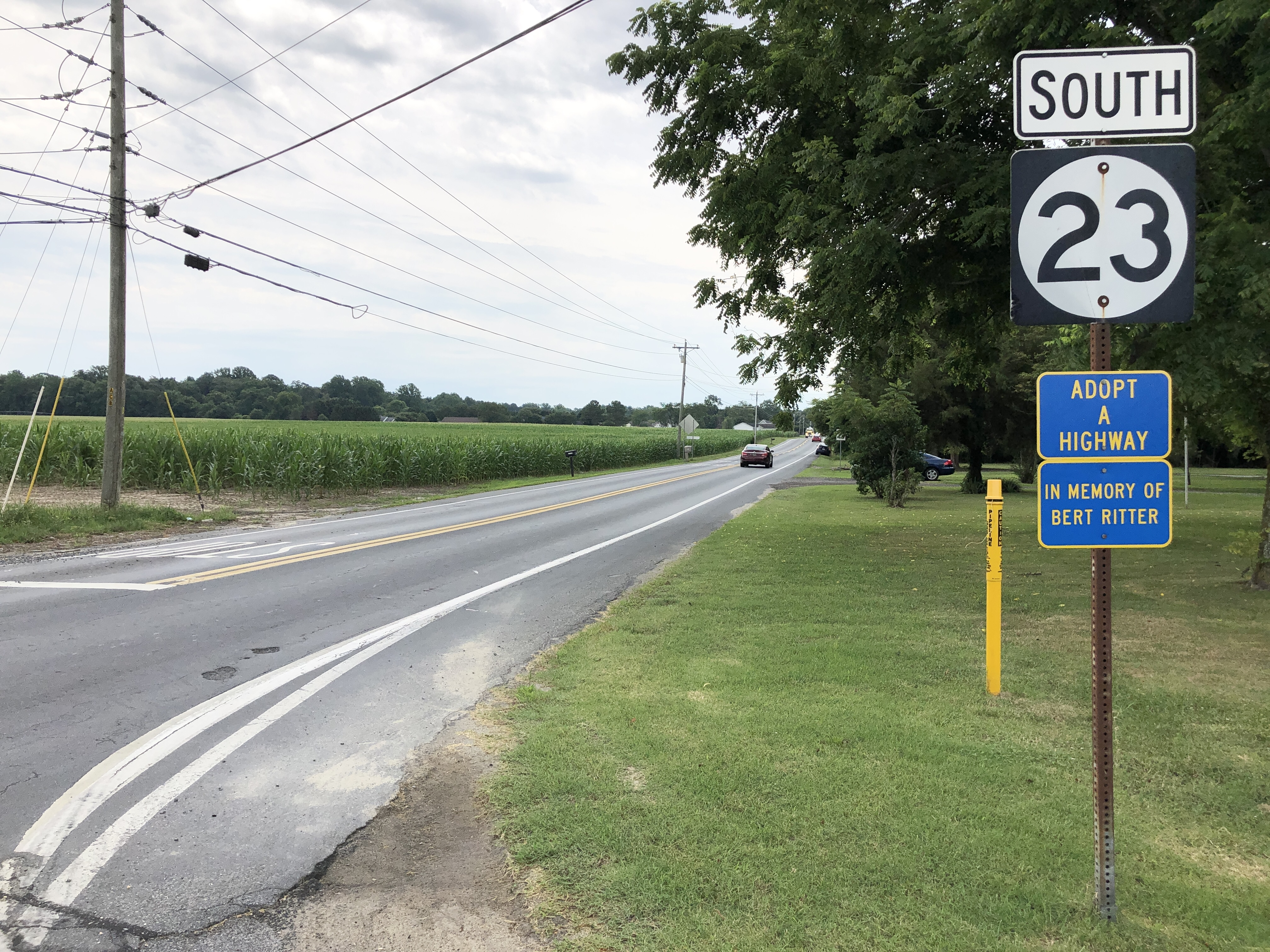
DE 23 southbound in Hollymount

By 1920, what is now DE 23 existed as an unimproved county road. The portion of the present route that is concurrent with DE 5 was upgraded to a state highway by 1931. DE 22 was designated in 1936 along the portion of present DE 23 south of the DE 5 intersection in Fairmount. By 1938, DE 22 was decommissioned, with DE 5 designated on the portion north of DE 24 while Long Neck Road south of there became unnumbered. By 1970, the road was paved. DE 23 was assigned onto its current alignment by 1994. DE 24 Alt. was designated to run along DE 23 between Hollymount Road and Plantation Road by 2006. On October 15, 2021, a roundabout opened at the entrance to the Anchors Run housing development.

In 1991, the Five Points intersection was reconfigured to separate the DE 23 and Plantation Road intersection from US 9/DE 404, with a short connector road linking US 9/DE 404 to the two roads. In addition, a jughandle was constructed from eastbound US 9/DE 404 to northbound DE 1. In 2022, construction began to reconfigure the intersection between US 9/DE 404 and DE 1D/DE 23 that would realign DE 1D and DE 23 to meet at a roundabout and intersect a longer connector road linking to US 9/DE 404 and also build a direct ramp from southbound DE 1 to US 9/DE 404 at the DE 1D/DE 23 intersection. Construction on this project is planned to be finished in 2024. The roundabout at the DE 1D and DE 23 junction opened on April 19, 2024, with the connection between the roundabout and US 9/DE 404 opening on May 16.

== Major intersections ==
The entire route is in Sussex County.

Location	mi	km	Destinations	Notes
Long Neck	0.00	0.00	Massey's Landing Boat Ramp	Southern terminus
Long Neck	5.47	8.80	DE 5 south / DE 24 (John J. Williams Highway) – Oak Orchard, Rehoboth Beach	South end of DE 5 overlap
Fairmount	8.01	12.89	DE 5 north (Indian Mission Road)	North end of DE 5 overlap
Hollymount	8.85	14.24	DE 24 Alt. west (Hollymount Road)	South end of DE 24 Alt. overlap
Nassau	15.60	25.11	DE 1D south / DE 24 Alt. east (Plantation Road)	Roundabout; north end of DE 24 Alt. overlap; northern terminus of DE 1D
Nassau	15.63	25.15	US 9 / DE 404 (Lewes Georgetown Highway) – Georgetown, Lewes, Beaches	Northern terminus
1.000 mi = 1.609 km; 1.000 km = 0.621 mi: Concurrency terminus
