= U.S. Route 9 in Delaware =

Highway in Delaware

U.S. Route 9

Route information
- Maintained by DelDOT and DRBA
- Length: 31.04 mi (49.95 km)
- Existed: 1974–present
- Tourist routes: Delaware Bayshore Byway; Historic Lewes Byway, Gateway to the Bayshore

Major junctions
- West end: US 13 in Laurel
- DE 20 in Hardscrabble; US 113 in Georgetown; DE 18 / DE 404 in Georgetown; DE 30 in Gravel Hill; DE 5 in Harbeson; DE 1D / DE 23 in Nassau; DE 1 in Nassau
- East end: US 9 via the Cape May–Lewes Ferry in Lewes

Location
- Country: United States
- State: Delaware
- Counties: Sussex

Highway system
- United States Numbered Highway System; List; Special; Divided; Delaware State Route System; List; Byways
← DE 8	→ DE 9
← DE 26	DE 28	→ DE 30

U.S. Route 9 (US 9) is a United States Numbered Highway in the Northeastern U.S., running from Laurel, Delaware, north to Champlain, New York. In Delaware, the route runs a southwest–northeast path through Sussex County. Even though US 9 is signed north–south for the remainder of its route, the segment in Delaware is signed east–west. The highway runs from its western terminus at US 13 in Laurel northeast to the Cape May–Lewes Ferry terminal in Lewes, where the ferry carries the route across the Delaware Bay to North Cape May, New Jersey. US 9 passes through rural areas and serves the communities of Laurel, Georgetown, and Lewes. US 9 intersects Delaware Route 20 (DE 20) in Hardscrabble, US 113 and DE 18/DE 404 in Georgetown, DE 30 in Gravel Hill, DE 5 in Harbeson, and DE 1 at the Five Points intersection in Nassau. US 9 runs concurrent with DE 404 between Georgetown and Five Points and with DE 1 between Five Points and Carpenters Corner.

What is now US 9 in Delaware was originally built as a state highway during the 1920s and designated by 1936 as Delaware Route 28 (DE 28) between Laurel and Georgetown and a part of DE 18 between Georgetown and Lewes. US 9 was extended to Delaware from New Jersey by way of the Cape May–Lewes Ferry in 1974, replacing all of DE 28 and the portion of DE 18 between Georgetown and Five Points, with the route aligned to bypass Lewes. DE 404 was designated concurrent with the portion of US 9 between Georgetown and Five Points by 1987.

== Route description ==
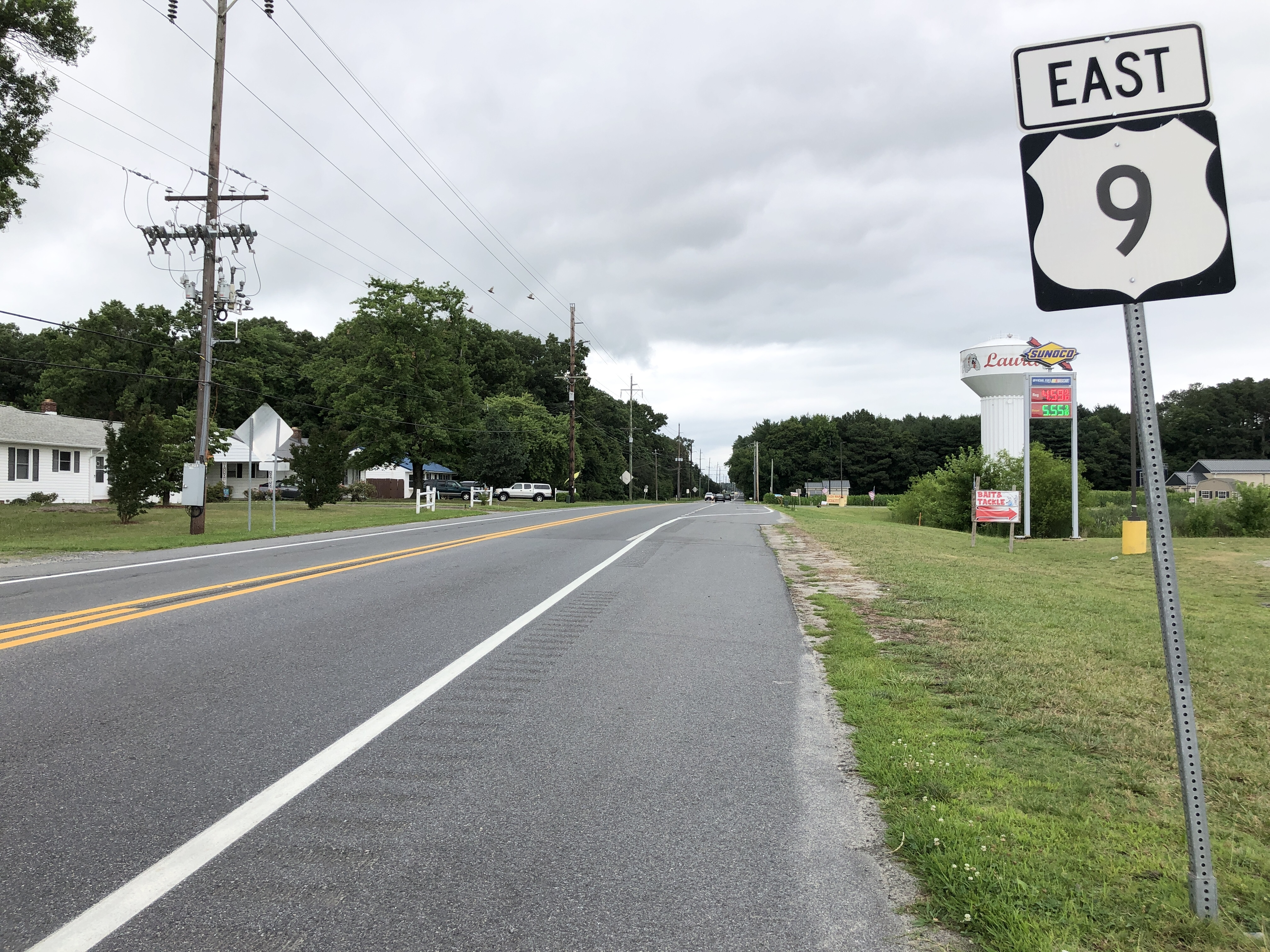
US 9 eastbound past the western terminus at US 13 in Laurel

US 9 begins at an intersection with US 13 in the commercial northern part of the town of Laurel, where the road continues west past the terminus of US 9 as Georgetown Road. From the western terminus, the route heads to the northeast on two-lane undivided County Seat Highway. The road leaves Laurel and runs through a mix of farmland and woodland with some homes. The route intersects DE 20 in the community of Hardscrabble, at which point it briefly becomes a divided highway. Past this intersection, US 9 becomes undivided again and continues through rural land, crossing Tyndall Branch and passing to the southeast of the University of Delaware's Carvel Research and Education Center and Sussex Technical High School. Past this, the route heads through the community of Whaleys Corners. Farther northeast, the road reaches the town of Georgetown and intersects US 113/DE 404 Truck in a commercial area. At this point, US 9 Truck heads south along US 113/DE 404 Truck to bypass Georgetown to the south. Following US 113, the route continues northeast on West Market Street through residential areas. US 9 enters downtown Georgetown and intersects DE 18/DE 404 at a traffic circle called The Circle, where the Sussex County Courthouse is located.

At this point, US 9 continues northeast concurrent with DE 404 on East Market Street through the downtown area. The road crosses the Delmarva Central Railroad's Indian River Subdivision line at-grade and runs through residential areas with a few businesses, passing south of the Southern Delaware Tourism Visitors Center. The roadway briefly becomes a divided highway at the Sand Hill Road/Airport Road intersection. US 9/DE 404 heads east-northeast out of Georgetown and becomes Lewes Georgetown Highway, passing through farmland and woodland with some development. The two routes intersect the eastern terminus of US 9 Truck/DE 404 Truck a short distance east of Georgetown. In the community of Gravel Hill, the road crosses DE 30. Following this intersection, US 9/DE 404 passes through more rural land, reaching a junction with DE 5 near businesses in the community of Harbeson. Past here, the two routes cross an abandoned railroad line at the Cool Spring Road intersection in the community of Cool Spring. Farther east, residential development near the road begins to increase, with the road passing through the community of Belltown. Upon reaching the area of the Five Points intersection in the community of Nassau, US 9/DE 404 runs past homes and businesses, widening into a divided highway and coming to an intersection with DE 1D/DE 23. US 9/DE 404 runs along a four-lane divided highway before the road comes to a junction with DE 1. Here, DE 404 ends, US 9 Business (US 9 Bus.) continues northeast, and US 9 heads east for a concurrency with DE 1. At this intersection, access from eastbound US 9 to northbound DE 1 is provided by a reverse jughandle.

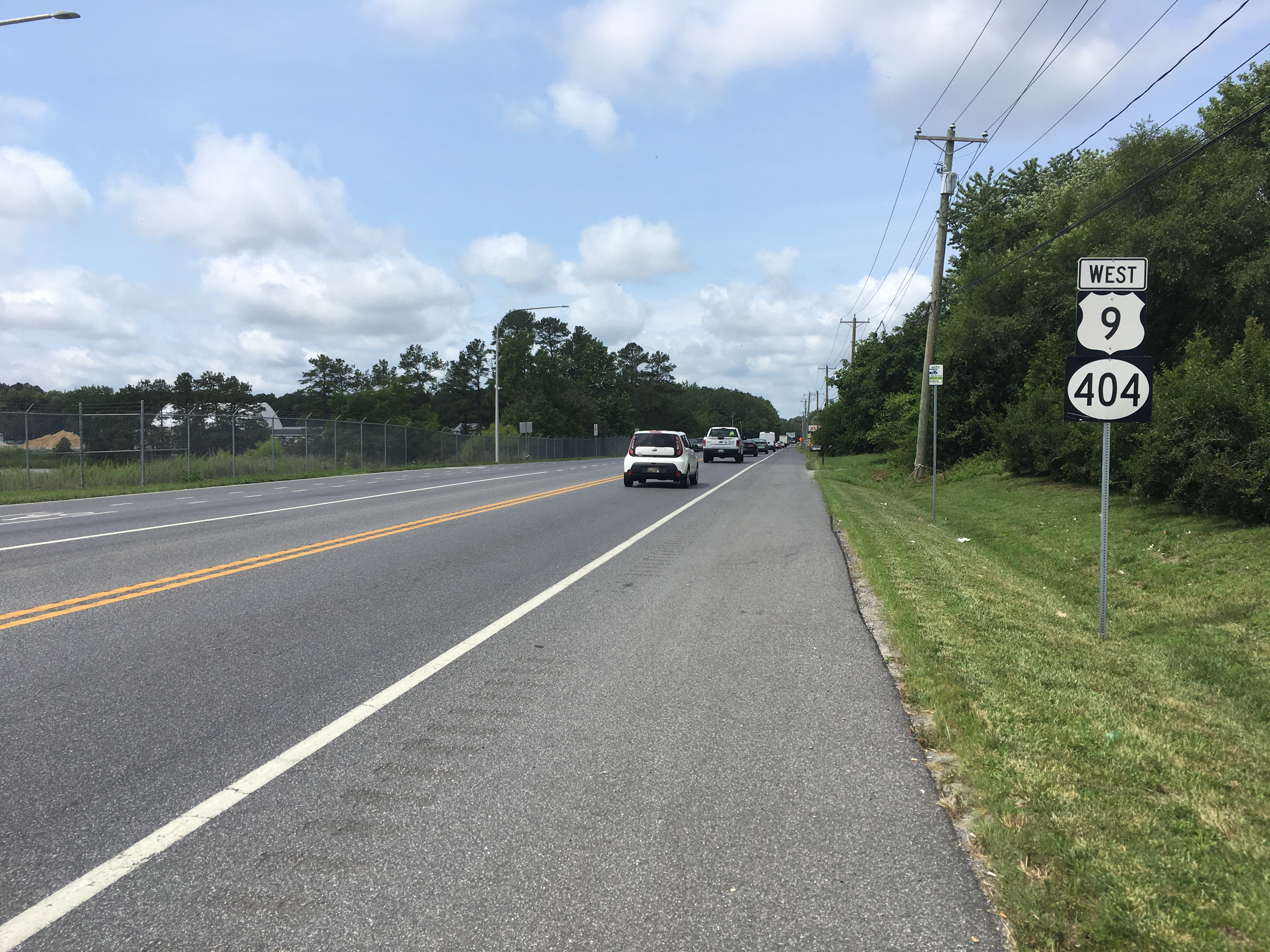
US 9/DE 404 westbound past DE 30 in Gravel Hill

Past the Five Points intersection, US 9 follows DE 1 on Coastal Highway, an eight-lane divided highway with six travel lanes and a combined right turn, bus, and bicycle lane in each direction. The road passes north of the Lewes Transit Center, a park-and-ride facility serving DART First State buses, and runs through commercial areas before it curves southeast into wooded areas. In the community of Carpenters Corner, US 9 splits from DE 1 by turning northeast onto Dartmouth Drive, a four-lane undivided road with three westbound lanes and one eastbound lane. A short distance later, the route turns north-northeast onto two-lane undivided Kings Highway, passing through farmland with some residential subdivisions and heading to the east of Cape Henlopen High School. US 9 splits from Kings Highway at a directional intersection and continues northeast on Theodore C. Freeman Highway, a road maintained by the Delaware River and Bay Authority (DRBA) that bypasses the city of Lewes to the southeast. The route runs between developed areas to the northwest and rural areas and the parallel Junction and Breakwater Trail to the southeast before crossing over the trail, Gills Neck Road, and the Lewes and Rehoboth Canal on a high-level bridge. The road bends north and heads across an abandoned railroad line. After this, US 9 intersects the eastern terminus of US 9 Bus. and turns east onto Cape Henlopen Drive, passing between residential development along the Delaware Bay to the north and the abandoned railroad tracks to the south. US 9 turns north onto a divided highway and comes to the Lewes Terminal of the Cape May–Lewes Ferry, which carries the route across the Delaware Bay to North Cape May, New Jersey. Cape Henlopen Drive continues east toward Cape Henlopen State Park.

The section of US 9 between US 113 and DE 1 serves as part of a primary hurricane evacuation route from the Delaware Beaches to points inland while the section of US 9 between US 13 and US 113 serves as part of a secondary hurricane evacuation route from the coastal areas. Sections of US 9 in Delaware are part of the Delaware Byways system. The portion of the route between DE 5 in Harbeson and DE 1 in Five Points is designated as part of the Delaware Bayshore Byway, which is also a National Scenic Byway. The portions of the route between DE 1 and Kings Highway and the eastern terminus of US 9 Bus. and the Cape May–Lewes Ferry terminal in Lewes are designated as part of the Historic Lewes Byway, Gateway to the Bayshore. US 9 in Delaware has an annual average daily traffic count ranging from a high of 58,655 vehicles along the DE 1 concurrency to a low of 977 vehicles at the Cape May–Lewes Ferry terminal. The portion of US 9 in Delaware east of DE 18/DE 404 in Georgetown is part of the National Highway System.

== History ==
Delaware Route 28
- Location: Laurel–Georgetown
- Length: 12.71 mi (20.45 km)
- Existed: 1936–1974

What is currently US 9 in Delaware existed as a state highway between Whaleys Corners and Georgetown by 1920, with the remainder as an unimproved county road. At the time, the road was a state aid highway between Laurel and Whaleys Corners and under contract as a state aid highway between Georgetown and Harbeson. By 1924, the state highway along the present alignment of US 9 was completed, running from Laurel through Georgetown to Lewes. A year later, what is now US 9 along the DE 1 concurrency between Wescoats Road and Carpenters Corner was built as a state highway. The Kings Highway portion of the current route was paved by 1931. When Delaware assigned numbers to its state highways by 1936, DE 28 was designated to run from US 13 (Central Avenue) in Laurel east to DE 18 in Georgetown while the road between Georgetown and Lewes became a part of DE 18. By 1954, US 13 was moved to a new alignment to the east of Laurel, and the western terminus of DE 28 was truncated from Central Avenue to the new location of US 13. The same year, the present alignment of US 9 between Five Points and Wescoats Road was constructed as part of a new divided highway alignment of DE 14.

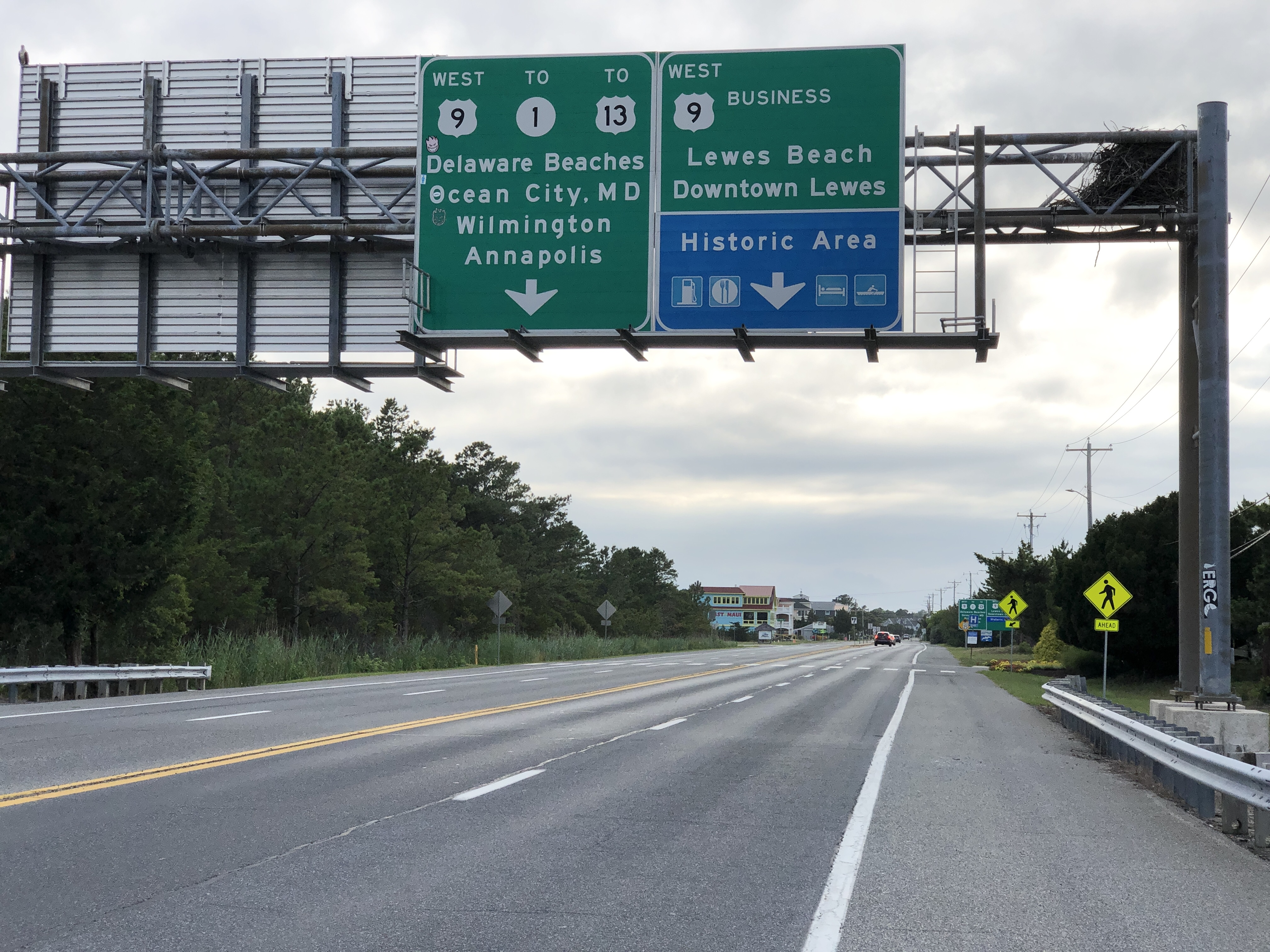
US 9 westbound approaching eastern terminus of US 9 Bus. in Lewes

The Cape May–Lewes Ferry was started on July 1, 1964; at this time, the ferry did not carry a route number. In 1964, construction was underway on an approach road to the ferry between Kings Highway and Cape Henlopen Drive; this road was built by the DRBA. On December 21, 1965, the Delaware Senate approved a resolution for the approach road to the ferry to be named the Theodore C. Freeman Highway after Theodore C. Freeman, an astronaut who attended Lewes Elementary School from 1936 to 1944 that was killed in a plane accident while training on October 31, 1964. The Theodore C. Freeman Highway was opened in 1966.

In 1974, US 9 was extended across the ferry from New Jersey to Delaware, replacing DE 28 between Laurel and Georgetown and DE 18 between Georgetown and Five Points. Between Five Points and the terminal of the Cape May–Lewes Ferry, US 9 followed DE 1/DE 14, Kings Highway, and Theodore C. Freeman Highway before coming to Cape Henlopen Drive. At the same time, US 9 Bus. was designated onto the former alignment of DE 18 between Five Points and Lewes as well as a portion of Cape Henlopen Drive connecting to US 9. US 9 Truck was created as a truck bypass of the portion of US 9 through Georgetown in 1983. DE 404 was extended to follow US 9 between Georgetown and Five Points by 1987.

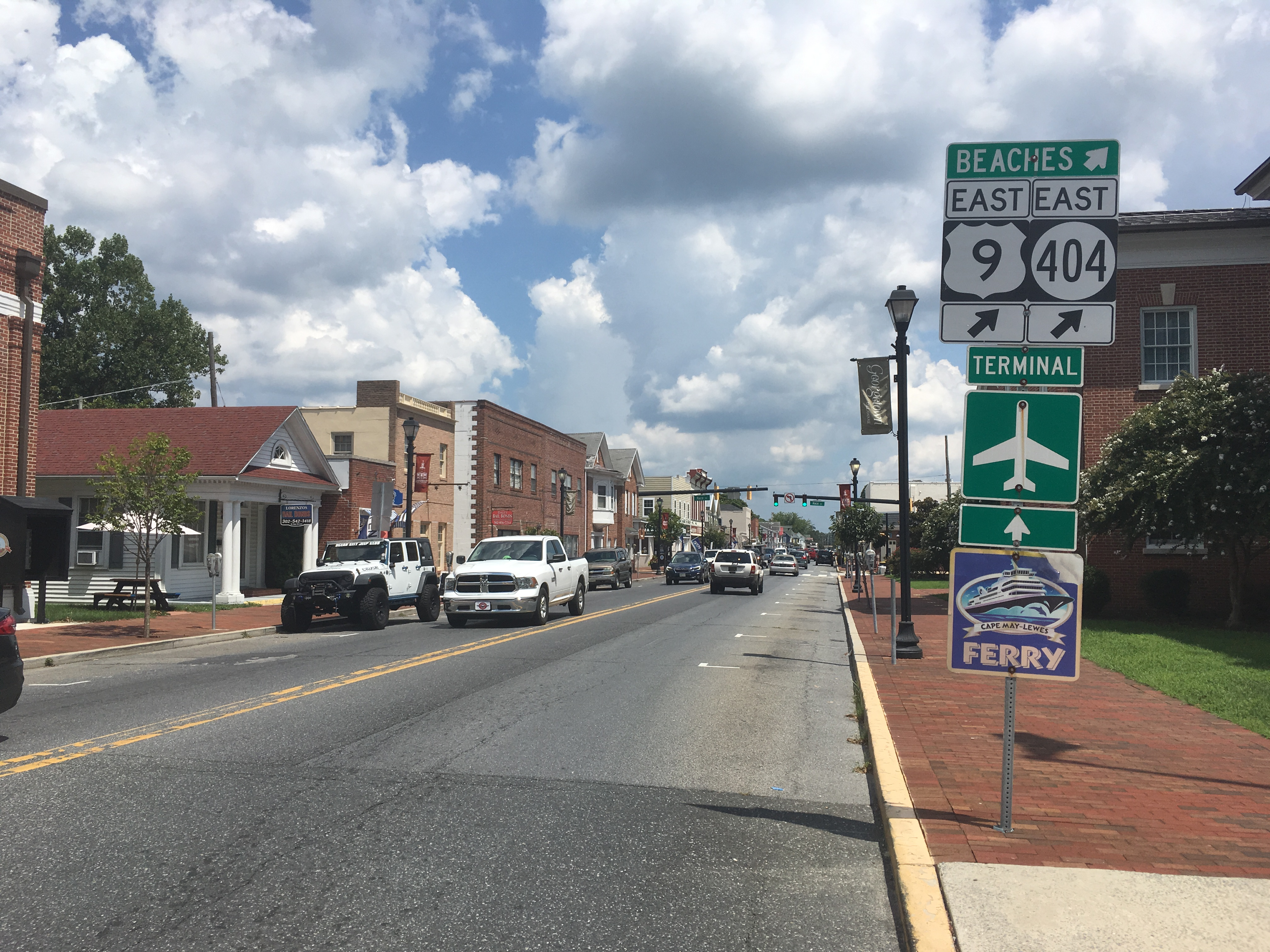
US 9/DE 404 eastbound past The Circle in Georgetown, where DE 18 ends and DE 404 joins US 9

In 1991, the Five Points intersection was reconfigured to separate the DE 23 and Plantation Road intersection from US 9/DE 404, with a short connector road linking US 9/DE 404 to the two roads. In addition, a jughandle was constructed from eastbound US 9/DE 404 to northbound DE 1. In 2004, the Delaware Department of Transportation began a study on converting the Five Points intersection into an interchange in addition to developing plans on widening US 9/DE 404 west of the Five Points intersection. Alternatives for these projects were presented at public workshops between 2004 and 2008, although the projects were canceled due to lack of support and financial limitations.

On January 25, 2021, construction began to realign Airport and Sand Hill roads at their intersection with US 9/DE 404 east of Georgetown as part of a larger project to create an eastern gateway into Georgetown. Construction was expected to be completed in April 2021.

In 2022, construction began to reconfigure the intersection between US 9/DE 404 and DE 1D/DE 23 that would realign DE 1D and DE 23 to meet at a roundabout and intersect a longer connector road linking to US 9/DE 404 and also build a direct ramp from southbound DE 1 to US 9/DE 404 at the DE 1D/DE 23 intersection. The connector to DE 1D/DE 23 and the ramp from southbound DE 1 opened on May 16, 2024. A proposed construction project will widen US 9 along Kings Highway between DE 1 and Theodore C. Freeman Highway near Lewes. The road will be widened to a four-lane divided highway with shared-use paths on both sides of the road. Along this stretch, roundabouts will be constructed at Dartmouth Drive, Clay Road, Gills Neck Road, the entrance to proposed developments, and Theodore C. Freeman Highway.

== Major intersections ==
The entire route is in Sussex County.

Location	mi	km	Destinations	Notes
Laurel	0.00	0.00	US 13 (Sussex Highway) – Delmar, Seaford	Western terminus
Hardscrabble	5.54	8.92	DE 20 (Concord Road/Hardscrabble Road) – Seaford, Millsboro	
Georgetown	11.96	19.25	US 113 / US 9 Truck east (Dupont Boulevard / DE 404 Truck) – Milford, Ocean City	Western terminus of US 9 Truck
Georgetown	12.71	20.45	DE 18 west / DE 404 west (North Bedford Street) – Delaware Tech, Bay Bridge	Traffic circle; west end of DE 404 overlap; eastern terminus of DE 18
Georgetown			US 9 Truck west / DE 404 Truck west (Park Avenue) to US 113	Eastern terminus of US 9 Truck/DE 404 Truck
Gravel Hill			DE 30 (Gravel Hill Road) – Milton, Millsboro	
Harbeson	18.76	30.19	DE 5 (Harbeson Road) – Milton, Harbeson, Oak Orchard	
Nassau	25.13	40.44	DE 1D south (Plantation Road) / DE 23 south (Beaver Dam Road)	Northern terminus of DE 23
Nassau	25.27	40.67	US 9 Bus. east (Savannah Road) – Lewes DE 1 north (Coastal Highway) – Milford, Dover DE 404 ends	East end of DE 404 overlap; west end of DE 1 overlap; eastern terminus of DE 404; western terminus of US 9 Bus.; no access from westbound US 9 Bus. to eastbound US 9/southbound DE 1
Carpenters Corner	26.43	42.53	DE 1 south (Coastal Highway) – Rehoboth Beach, Beaches	East end of DE 1 overlap
Lewes	29.33	47.20	US 9 Bus. west (Cape Henlopen Drive) – Lewes Beach, Downtown Lewes, Historic Area	Eastern terminus of US 9 Bus.
Delaware Bay	31.04	49.95	Cape May–Lewes Ferry	
Delaware Bay			US 9 north to G.S. Parkway – Cape May, West Cape May, Wildwoods	Continuation into New Jersey
1.000 mi = 1.609 km; 1.000 km = 0.621 mi: Concurrency terminus; Tolled

== See also ==
U.S. Route 9
Previous state: Terminus	Delaware	Next state: New Jersey
