= Angola, Delaware =

Unincorporated community in Delaware

Angola, Delaware Angola by the Bay
- Unincorporated community
- Location within Delaware Location within the United States
- Coordinates: 38°40′09″N 075°11′21″W
- Country: United States
- State: Delaware
- County: Sussex
- Elevation: 23 ft (7.0 m)
- Time zone: UTC-5 (Eastern (EST))
  - Summer (DST): UTC-4 (EDT)
- Area code: 302
- GNIS feature ID: 216441

Angola is an unincorporated community adjacent to the Angola Neck peninsula in Sussex County, Delaware, United States. Angola is located on an inlet of Rehoboth Bay and is near Delaware Route 24. It is a population center for the Indian River Hundred.

== Geography ==
Angola lies along Delaware Route 24, where that road crosses Herring Creek. Angola is 2.5 miles (4.0 km) east of Hollyville and 5 miles (8.0 km) northwest of Long Neck.

== History ==
Angola took its name from the slaves from Angola who were imported to the community ("the First Africans in Virginia"). The nearby peninsular area has been called "Angola Neck" since the 1600s, as Gullahs were used for plantation labor, both before and after slavery was abolished.

=== 19th century ===
In 1800, Methodists in Angola began meeting at the Angola Schoolhouse. In 1838, a site on Robinsonville Road was selected, and this became Connelly's Methodist Episcopal Church, now known as Conley's United Methodist Church.

In 1836, the Angola post office began operations. Circa the 1850s, a dam was built on Herring Creek, creating Burton's Millpond. There was once a grist mill on this dam.

In February 1876, a new church in Angola was blown off its foundations due to extreme winds.

Circa 1890, Angola's population was just 12 residents.

=== 20th century ===
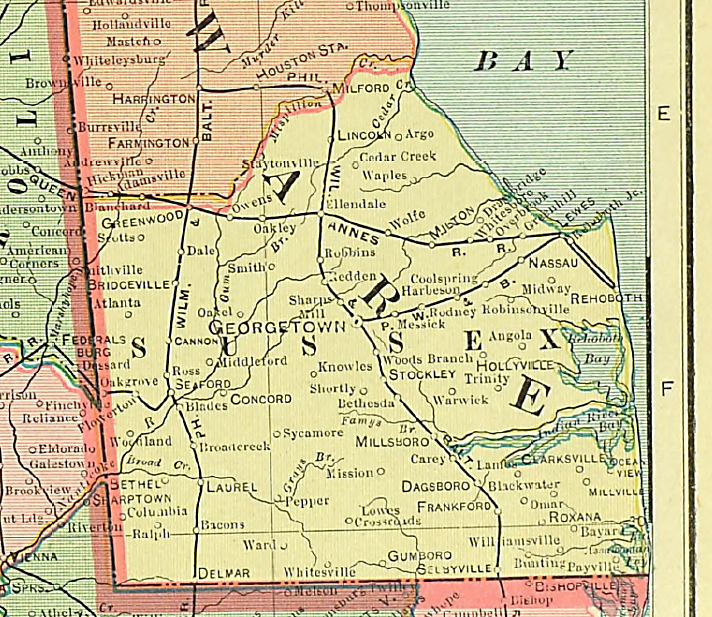
Angola in Sussex County, Delaware, in 1902

Angola's population had grown to 18 residents by 1900. Around this time, the community was the site of the Angola Grange, a social organization intended to promote the economic well-being of the community.

By 1925, Angola's population had grown to 95 residents. In the early 20th century, the Angola Telephone Company operated a telephone exchange in the area, following a Sussex County decision allowing telephone companies to place telephone poles and lines along roadways.

The community had a post office until 1937. The population was 50 in 1940.

By 1955, Angola was said to consist of "a store and several houses". The store was the Burton store, an old country mercantile.
