= Cool Spring, Delaware =

Unincorporated community in Delaware, United States

- Unincorporated community
- Location within Delaware Location within the United States
- Coordinates: 38°43′55″N 75°14′54″W
- Country: United States
- State: Delaware
- County: Sussex
- Elevation: 30 ft (9.1 m)
- Time zone: UTC-5 (Eastern (EST))
  - Summer (DST): UTC-4 (EDT)
- Area code: 302
- GNIS feature ID: 216071

Cool Spring is an unincorporated community in Sussex County, in the U.S. state of Delaware. It is located on U.S. Route 9 and is about five miles from both Nassau and Jimtown.

== History ==
Cool Spring's population was 200 in 1890, 193 in 1900, and 131 in 1925.
