= Fairmount, Delaware =

Unincorporated community in Delaware, United States

- Unincorporated community
- Location within the state of Delaware Fairmount, Delaware (the United States)
- Coordinates: 38°39′59″N 75°13′17″W
- Country: United States
- State: Delaware
- County: Sussex
- Time zone: UTC-5 (Eastern (EST))
  - Summer (DST): UTC-4 (EDT)

Fairmount is an unincorporated community in Sussex County, Delaware, United States. It is one of the Three Sisters communities consisting of Fairmount, Hollyville, and Hollymount. Fairmount is the area located around the intersections of Delaware Route 5 and Delaware Route 23.

The community is part of the Salisbury, Maryland-Delaware Metropolitan Statistical Area.

== History ==
Fairmount's population was 20 in 1925, and 100 in 1960.
