= Harbeson, Delaware =

Unincorporated community in Delaware, United States

- Unincorporated community
- Location within the state of Delaware Harbeson (the United States)
- Coordinates: 38°43′29″N 75°17′6″W
- Country: United States
- State: Delaware
- County: Sussex
- Elevation: 36 ft (11 m)
- Time zone: UTC-5 (Eastern (EST))
  - Summer (DST): UTC-4 (EDT)
- ZIP code: 19951
- Area code: 302
- GNIS feature ID: 214054

Harbeson is an unincorporated community in east central Sussex County, Delaware, United States. It lies at the intersection of U.S. Route 9/Delaware Route 404 and Delaware Route 5, east of the town of Georgetown, the county seat of Sussex County. Its elevation is 36 feet (11 m). It has a post office with the ZIP code 19951.

Harbeson is part of the Salisbury, Maryland-Delaware Metropolitan Statistical Area.

== History ==
Harbeson was named for Harbeson Hickman, a large landowner.
