= Gravel Hill, Delaware =

Unincorporated community in Delaware, United States

- Unincorporated community
- Location within Delaware Location within the United States
- Coordinates: 38°42′51″N 75°18′57″W
- Country: United States
- State: Delaware
- County: Sussex
- Elevation: 39 ft (12 m)
- Time zone: UTC-5 (Eastern (EST))
  - Summer (DST): UTC-4 (EDT)
- Area code: 302
- GNIS feature ID: 216102

Gravel Hill is an unincorporated community in Sussex County, Delaware, United States. Gravel Hill is located at the intersection of U.S. Route 9/Delaware Route 404 and Delaware Route 30, east of Georgetown.
