= Hollymount, Delaware =

Unincorporated community in Delaware, United States

- Unincorporated community
- Location within the state of Delaware Hollymount, Delaware (the United States)
- Coordinates: 38°40′31″N 75°13′18″W
- Country: United States
- State: Delaware
- County: Sussex
- Time zone: UTC-5 (Eastern (EST))
  - Summer (DST): UTC-4 (EDT)

Hollymount is an unincorporated community in Sussex County, Delaware, United States. It is one of the Three Sisters communities consisting of Fairmount, Hollyville, and Hollymount. Hollymount is the area located around the intersections of Delaware Route 23 and Delaware Route 24 Alternate (Sussex County Road 48).

The community is part of the Salisbury, Maryland-Delaware Metropolitan Statistical Area.
