= Jimtown, Delaware =

Unincorporated community in Delaware, United States

- Unincorporated community
- Location within Delaware Location within the United States
- Coordinates: 38°43′55″N 75°11′12″W
- Country: United States
- State: Delaware
- County: Sussex
- Elevation: 20 ft (6.1 m)
- Time zone: UTC-5 (Eastern (EST))
  - Summer (DST): UTC-4 (EDT)
- Area code: 302
- GNIS feature ID: 216126

Jimtown is an unincorporated community in Sussex County, Delaware, United States.

== Geography ==
Jimtown is located on Delaware Route 23 southwest of Lewes. It is along Jimtown Road, near Goslee Creek. Less than a mile south of Jimtown is Goslee Mill Pond.

== History ==
=== Early years ===
The area around Jimtown was settled by whites as early as the 1690s when the court at either Lewes or Sussex County (Note: Scharf gives two versions of events: one on page 1218, and one on page 1256. In both versions, the land is granted by the court, but identification of the court, and who is granted the land, is different.) granted a petitioner land on Bundick's Branch to build a mill, so long as he "build the mill within fifteen months and [...] attend and minde the same and grind the grain well and in due course as it is brought thither without respect of persons, at the eighth part tolle for wheat and the sixth part tolle for Indian corne." Two years later, Jonathan Bailey built a mill on this stream.

However, Scharf's History of Delaware states that no village was in this part of Delaware as late as 1888.

Jimtown was from early on an African-American community. In the early 20th century, the site was the location of a "colored" schoolhouse during an era when segregation was still legal in Delaware.

Jimtown made state headlines in 1915, during the prohibition era, when twelve Jimtown residents were arrested in state raids on alcoholic establishments. Most of those arrested were African-Americans.

=== 21st century ===
Some residents in Jimtown clashed with the Delaware Department of Transportation and real estate developers in 2004 regarding upgrades to Jimtown Road. Residents stated that the department's plans to upgrade only a portion of the road clashed with the plan to build 650 houses adjacent to the historic community. Residents in Jimtown clashed again with the owners of the neighboring subdivision of Coastal Club near Lewes in 2014 over the issue of streetlights, sidewalks, and sewer connections in the community; the plan at that time was to offer Jimtown residents sewer and streetlights connecting to the new subdivision. In 2018, a 49-lot subdivision adjacent to Jimtown, named Marine, was approved by Sussex County officials.
