= Scotts Corner, Delaware =

Unincorporated community in Delaware, United States

- Unincorporated community
- Location within Delaware Location within the United States
- Coordinates: 38°46′51″N 75°40′02″W
- Country: United States
- State: Delaware
- County: Sussex
- Elevation: 49 ft (15 m)
- Time zone: UTC-5 (Eastern (EST))
  - Summer (DST): UTC-4 (EDT)
- Area code: 302
- GNIS feature ID: 216208

Scotts Corner is an unincorporated community in Sussex County, Delaware, United States. Scotts Corner is located at the junction of state routes 36 and 404, 4.5 miles (7.2 km) west-southwest of Greenwood.
