= Baywood Greens =

Coordinates: 38°38′23″N 75°10′53″W

- Location within Delaware

Club information
- Location: Long Neck, Delaware
- Established: 1998
- Type: Public
- Total holes: 18
- Website: https://www.baywoodgreens.com/golf

Baywood Greens is a public golf club located in Long Neck, Delaware that is consistently rated as one of the very best in the state.

The front nine holes are nicknamed the "Woods Nine", while the back nine holes carry the "Water Nine" nickname. A third 9-hole grouping is planned on the north side of Delaware Route 24, which is supposed to be the "Sand Nine".

The course is noted for having over 200,000 flowers, plants, shrubs, and trees that decorate the playing area.

With the future construction of a large hotel, the owners hope to vie for PGA tournament status.

A medium-sized community of upscale modular homes surrounds the golf course.

BayWood Greens
Tee	Rating/Slope	1	2	3	4	5	6	7	8	9	Out	10	11	12	13	14	15	16	17	18	In	Total
Blue	74.0/144	375	365	435	462	603	223	538	161	392	3554	410	190	320	534	425	195	515	415	425	3429	6983
Black	72.1/140	354	348	419	438	558	217	506	136	342	3318	383	169	303	501	409	170	473	386	379	3173	6491
White	M:70.2/134 L:76.0/142	349	318	395	422	515	202	480	131	320	3132	360	139	288	477	385	145	452	364	346	2956	6088
White/Yellow	M:67.6/122 L:72.8/131	272	318	342	374	475	152	408	131	320	2792	333	139	288	430	325	145	452	311	318	2741	5533
Yellow	M:65.7/111 L:70.2/124	272	257	342	374	475	152	408	112	246	2638	333	118	227	430	325	94	377	311	318	2533	5171
Yellow/Green	L:66.4/115	222	257	276	242	375	146	342	112	246	2218	256	110	227	344	325	94	377	311	258	2302	4520
Green Family Tee	L:64.9/112	222	212	276	242	375	146	342	90	241	2146	256	110	221	344	227	90	308	254	258	2068	4214
SI		13	11	3	1	5	15	7	17	9		4	16	18	14	2	12	10	8	6
Par		4	4	4	4	5	3	5	3	4	36	4	3	4	5	4	3	5	4	4	36	72
