= Adams Crossroads, Delaware =

Unincorporated community in Delaware, United States

- Unincorporated community
- Location within Delaware Location within the United States
- Coordinates: 38°47′50″N 75°42′5″W
- Country: United States
- State: Delaware
- County: Sussex
- Elevation: 36 ft (11 m)
- Time zone: UTC-5 (Eastern (EST))
  - Summer (DST): UTC-4 (EDT)
- Area code: 302
- GNIS feature ID: 216014

Adams Crossroads is a settlement 2.7 miles (4.3 km) southeast of Hickman, Delaware, United States. Adams Crossroads is located at the intersection of Delaware Route 404 and Adamsville Road, northwest of Bridgeville in the Northwest Fork Hundred.

== See also ==
- Adamsville, Delaware
- Adams Home Farm
