= Hollyville, Delaware =

Unincorporated community in Delaware, United States

- Unincorporated community
- Location within the state of Delaware Hollyville, Delaware (the United States)
- Coordinates: 38°40′18″N 75°14′32″W
- Country: United States
- State: Delaware
- County: Sussex
- Time zone: UTC-5 (Eastern (EST))
  - Summer (DST): UTC-4 (EDT)

Hollyville is an unincorporated community in Sussex County, Delaware, United States. It is one of the Three Sisters communities consisting of Fairmount, Hollyville, and Hollymount. Hollyville is the area located around the intersections of Delaware Route 24 Alternate (Sussex County Road 48) and Sussex County Road 290.

The community is part of the Salisbury, Maryland-Delaware Metropolitan Statistical Area.
