= Long Neck, Delaware =

Census-designated place in Delaware, United States

- Census-designated place
- Location in Sussex County and the state of Delaware.

- Location within the state of Delaware Long Neck (the United States)
- Coordinates: 38°37′12″N 75°09′03″W
- Country: United States
- State: Delaware
- County: Sussex

Area
  - Total: 3.14 sq mi (8.12 km^{2})
  - Land: 2.76 sq mi (7.15 km^{2})
  - Water: 0.37 sq mi (0.97 km^{2})
- Elevation: 13 ft (4.0 m)

Population (2020)
  - Total: 3,017
  - Density: 1,093.5/sq mi (422.21/km^{2})
- Time zone: UTC-5 (Eastern (EST))
  - Summer (DST): UTC-4 (EDT)
- ZIP code: 19966
- Area code: 302
- FIPS code: 10-43245
- GNIS feature ID: 1867106

Long Neck is a census-designated place (CDP) in Sussex County, Delaware, United States. As of the 2020 census, Long Neck had a population of 3,017. Long Neck was the only census-designated place in Sussex County until Lincoln was added in the 2020 United States census. It is part of the Seaford, Delaware, Micropolitan Statistical Area.

== Geography ==
Long Neck is located at 38°37′12″N 75°09′03″W (38.6201125, -75.1507399).

According to the United States Census Bureau, the CDP has a total area of 2.6 square miles (6.7 km^{2}), of which 0.68% is water.

== Demographics ==
Historical population
| Census | Pop. | Note | %± |
|---|---|---|---|
| 1990 | 886 | | — |
| 2000 | 1,629 | | 83.9% |
| 2010 | 1,980 | | 21.5% |
| 2020 | 3,017 | | 52.4% |
U.S. Decennial Census

=== 2020 census ===
As of the 2020 census, Long Neck had a population of 3,017. The median age was 62.4 years. 11.1% of residents were under the age of 18 and 44.3% of residents were 65 years of age or older. For every 100 females there were 82.3 males, and for every 100 females age 18 and over there were 80.3 males age 18 and over.

100.0% of residents lived in urban areas, while 0.0% lived in rural areas.

There were 1,501 households in Long Neck, of which 12.3% had children under the age of 18 living in them. Of all households, 48.9% were married-couple households, 17.4% were households with a male householder and no spouse or partner present, and 28.4% were households with a female householder and no spouse or partner present. About 33.2% of all households were made up of individuals and 20.0% had someone living alone who was 65 years of age or older.

There were 2,404 housing units, of which 37.6% were vacant. The homeowner vacancy rate was 1.8% and the rental vacancy rate was 9.3%.

Racial composition as of the 2020 census
| Race | Number | Percent |
|---|---|---|
| White | 2,740 | 90.8% |
| Black or African American | 95 | 3.1% |
| American Indian and Alaska Native | 17 | 0.6% |
| Asian | 15 | 0.5% |
| Native Hawaiian and Other Pacific Islander | 0 | 0.0% |
| Some other race | 24 | 0.8% |
| Two or more races | 126 | 4.2% |
| Hispanic or Latino (of any race) | 71 | 2.4% |

=== 2000 census ===
As of the census of 2000, there were 1,629 people, 817 households, and 545 families residing in the CDP. The population density was 655.0 inhabitants per square mile (252.9/km^{2}). There were 1,807 housing units at an average density of 726.6 units per square mile (280.5 units/km^{2}). The racial makeup of the CDP was 98.28% White, 0.43% African American, 0.25% Native American, 0.06% Asian, 0.37% from other races, and 0.61% from two or more races. Hispanic or Latino of any race were 0.49% of the population.

There were 817 households, out of which 10.5% had children under the age of 18 living with them, 58.6% were married couples living together, 5.6% had a female householder with no husband present, and 33.2% were non-families. 29.1% of all households were made up of individuals, and 19.3% had someone living alone who was 65 years of age or older. The average household size was 1.99 and the average family size was 2.38.

In the CDP, the population was spread out, with 10.4% under the age of 18, 3.2% from 18 to 24, 13.6% from 25 to 44, 32.3% from 45 to 64, and 40.5% who were 65 years of age or older. The median age was 62 years. For every 100 females, there were 92.8 males. For every 100 females age 18 and over, there were 89.9 males.

The median income for a household in the CDP was $34,688, and the median income for a family was $47,917. Males had a median income of $27,117 versus $30,179 for females. The per capita income for the CDP was $25,172. About 6.3% of families and 8.4% of the population were below the poverty line, including none of those under age 18 and 6.2% of those age 65 or over.

== History ==
This is taken from deed record, page 247, Georgetown Court House, Delaware titled as;

"William Burton Patent for Long Neck"

"Whereas, there is a certaine parcel of land situated on the West side of Delaware Bay the which hath been certified by the Court at the Horekill and laide out for William Burton the saide Land being called the Long Neck lying on the South side of Rehoboth Bay and on the North side of the Greate River beginning at a point of woods and running West up the Greate River one thousand perches to a White Oak at the head of a small creek called Indian Cabin Creek and from thence North three hundred and fifty perches to a White Oak standing by a creek side called Middle Creek with a line of marked trees and from thence bounder upon the aforesaid Bay to the first bounded point Southeast one thousand perches containing One Thousand Acres of Land."

"Know Ye That by Virtue of His Majesty Lord's Patent and the Commission and authority unto me given by His Royal Highness, I have given and granted by these presents, Doe hereby give and grant unto the said William Burton his heirs and assigns the aforesaid recited piece of Land and Premises with their and every of their appurtenances; To Have and To Hold the saide piece of land and premises unto the saide William Burton his heirs and assigns unto the proper use and behoofe of him the said William Burton his heirs and assigns forever he making present improvements thereon and continuing in obedience and conforming himself according to the Laws of this Government and yielding and paying therefor yearly and every yeare unto His Royal Highness as a quite Rent Ten bushels of good winter wheat unto such officers as shall be there Impowered to receive the same."

For most of the second half of the 20th century, the area of Long Neck was sparsely populated, except for several mobile home communities that served mostly as summer vacation properties for permanent residents of the Washington, DC, Baltimore, Maryland, Wilmington, Delaware, and Philadelphia, Pennsylvania metropolitan areas. However, in the late 1990s, more permanent, year-round communities began being built, such as the neighborhood surrounding the golf course at Baywood Greens, and The Peninsula, which is being developed by Jack Nicklaus. Long Neck is now seeing unprecedented growth in permanent residents.

== Education ==
Long Neck Elementary School is a part of the Indian River School District. The school serves Grades K - 5th.
