= Nassau, Delaware =

Unincorporated community in Delaware, United States

- Unincorporated community
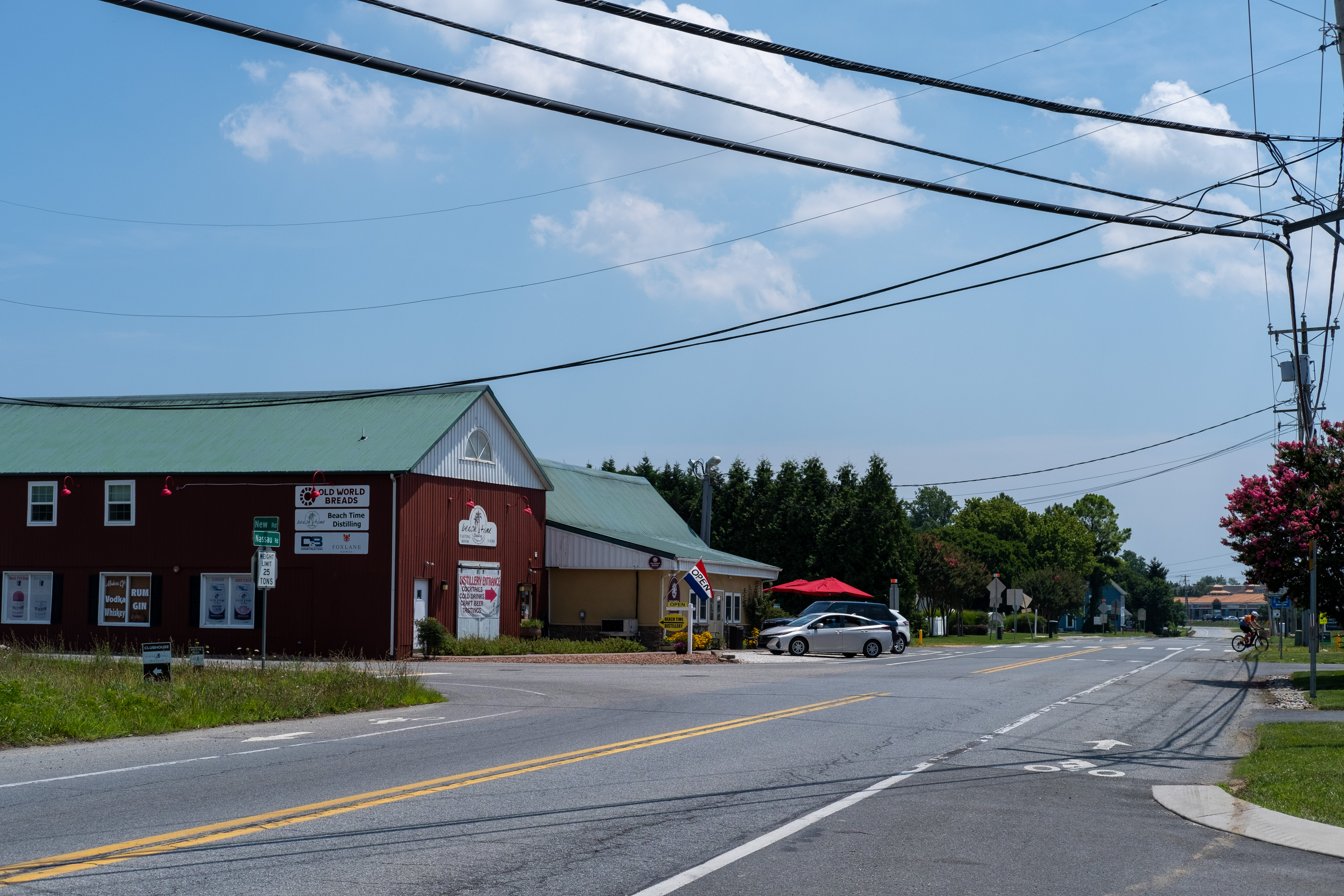
- Intersection of Nassau Road and New Road

- Location within the state of Delaware Nassau (the United States)
- Coordinates: 38°45′7″N 75°11′16″W
- Country: United States
- State: Delaware
- County: Sussex
- Elevation: 26 ft (7.9 m)
- Time zone: UTC-5 (Eastern (EST))
  - Summer (DST): UTC-4 (EDT)
- ZIP code: 19969
- Area code: 302
- GNIS feature ID: 214371

Nassau is an unincorporated community in eastern Sussex County, Delaware, United States. It lies just off Delaware Route 1 west of the city of Lewes and northeast of the town of Georgetown, the county seat of Sussex County. Its elevation is 26 feet (8 m). It has a post office with the ZIP code 19969.

Nassau, like much of central Delmarva, is part of the Salisbury, Maryland-Delaware Metropolitan Statistical Area. The Delaware Coast Line Railway passed through Nassau on its way to its customer in Lewes, SPI Pharma, and maintained a run-around track in Nassau to facilitate the moves to SPI Pharma, the locomotive using the run-around to then continue pushing the consist of tankcars and/or covered hoppers over the trackage between Nassau and Lewes to the end-of-track for the Lewes Branch at SPI Pharma, just outside the main entrance to Cape Henlopen State Park. The last train run was in 2017. The ROW is now a bike and pedestrian trail.
