= Oak Orchard, Delaware =

Unincorporated community in Delaware, United States

- Unincorporated community
- Location within the state of Delaware Oak Orchard (the United States)
- Coordinates: 38°35′46″N 75°10′22″W
- Country: United States
- State: Delaware
- County: Sussex
- Elevation: 0 ft (0 m)
- Time zone: UTC-5 (Eastern (EST))
  - Summer (DST): UTC-4 (EDT)
- ZIP code: 19966
- Area code: 302
- GNIS feature ID: 214399

Oak Orchard is an unincorporated community east of the town of Millsboro, Delaware, United States. Oak Orchard is bordered to the south by the Indian River Bay, to the east by Emily Gut (a narrow channel of water) and "the Peninsula", and to the north by Delaware Route 24.

Oak Orchard is part of the Salisbury, Maryland-Delaware Metropolitan Statistical Area.

This area is the home of the state-recognized Nanticoke Indian Association and the Nanticoke Indian Museum as well as a yearly Pow-wow held by the Nanticoke Indian Association. The unincorporated community is home to the Oak Orchard/Riverdale Post of the American Legion.

Fire protection is provided by the Indian River Vol. Fire Co., ambulance service by the Mid-Sussex Rescue Squad, and police services are provided by the Delaware State Police as there is no incorporated town to provide such services. Oak Orchard was the scene of a house fire on January 3, 2001, that killed 11 family members.
