= Herring Creek (Rehoboth Bay tributary) =

Herring Creek Tributary to Rehoboth Bay
- Location within Delaware Location within the United States

Location
- Country: United States
- State: Delaware
- County: Sussex

Physical characteristics
- Source: confluence of Burton Prong and Hopkins Prong
  - location: just south of Angola Beach
  - coordinates: 38°39′26″N 075°10′05″W
  - elevation: 0 ft (0 m)
- Mouth: Rehoboth Bay
  - location: Angola Landing
  - coordinates: 38°38′34″N 075°08′00″W
  - elevation: 0 ft (0 m)
- Length: 2.85 mi (4.59 km)
- Basin size: 32.82 square miles (85.0 km^{2})
- Discharge
  - average: 38.55 cu ft/s (1.092 m^{3}/s) at mouth with Rehoboth Bay

Basin features
- Progression: southeast
- River system: Rehoboth Bay
- Tributaries
  - left: Burton Prong
  - right: Hopkins Prong; Guinea Creek; Wilson Creek

Herring Creek is a 2.85 mi (4.59 km) long 3rd order tributary to Rehoboth Bay, in Sussex County, Delaware.

== Course ==
Herring Creek is formed at the confluence of Burton Prong and Hopkins Prong, south of Angola Beach in Sussex County, Delaware. Herring Creek then flows southeast to meet Rehoboth Bay at Angola Landing.

== Watershed ==
Herring Creek drains 32.82 square miles (85.0 km^{2}) of area, receives about 45.0 in/year of precipitation, has a topographic wetness index of 638.39 and is about 23.7% forested.

== See also ==
- List of rivers of Delaware
