= Love Creek (Rehoboth Bay tributary) =

Love Creek Tributary to Rehoboth Bay
- Location within Delaware Location within the United States

Location
- Country: United States
- State: Delaware
- County: Sussex

Physical characteristics
- Source: confluence of Goslee Creek and Bundicks Branch
  - location: Goslee Millpond
  - coordinates: 38°43′07″N 075°11′19″W
  - elevation: 7 ft (2.1 m)
- Mouth: Rehoboth Bay
  - location: about 0.1 miles south of Old Landing, Delaware
  - coordinates: 38°41′37″N 075°09′01″W
  - elevation: 0 ft (0 m)
- Length: 3.68 mi (5.92 km)
- Basin size: 18.02 square miles (46.7 km^{2})
- Discharge
  - average: 1.96 cu ft/s (0.056 m^{3}/s) at mouth with Rehoboth Bay

Basin features
- Progression: southeast
- River system: Rehoboth Bay
- Tributaries
  - left: Goslee Creek; Hetty Fisher Glade; Dorman Branch; Arnell Creek
  - right: Bundicks Branch; Stillman Glade; Cherry Walk Creek
- Waterbodies: Goslee Millpond
- Bridges: Robinsonville Road; DE 24

Love Creek is a 3.68 mi (5.92 km) long 3rd order tributary to Rehoboth Bay, in Sussex County, Delaware. Except for the part in Goslee Millpond, the creek is entirely tidal.

== Course ==
Love Creek is formed at the confluence of Goslee Creek and Bundicks Branch within Goslee Millpond in Sussex County, Delaware. Love Creek then flows southeast to meet Rehoboth Bay about 0.1 miles south of Old Landing.

The Love Creek Bridge clearance is 8'7" at low tide and 6' at high tide. The pier water depth is 5' at high tide and 2'6" at low tide.

== Watershed ==
Love Creek drains 18.02 square miles (46.7 km^{2}) of area, receives about 45.3 in/year of precipitation, has a topographic wetness index of 623.30 and is about 20.8% forested.

== See also ==
- List of rivers of Delaware
