= Augustine Creek =

Augustine Creek may refer to:

- Augustine Creek (Delaware Bay tributary), in Delaware
- Saint Augustine Creek, a tributary of the Savannah River, in Georgia
