= Doty Glade =

Stream in Delaware, USA

Doty Glade Tributary to Broadkill River
- Location of Doty Glade mouth Doty Glade (the United States)

Location
- Country: United States
- State: Delaware
- County: Sussex

Physical characteristics
- Source: Beaverdam Creek divide
  - location: about 1 mi (1.6 km) south of Steamboat Landing, Delaware
  - coordinates: 38°47′24.68″N 075°14′16.35″W
  - elevation: 8 ft (2.4 m)
- Mouth: Broadkill River
  - location: about 0.5 mi (0.80 km) miles northeast of Steamboat Landing, Delaware
  - coordinates: 38°48′18.40″N 075°13′23.67″W
  - elevation: 0 ft (0 m)
- Length: 2.44 mi (3.93 km)
- Basin size: 1.72 square miles (4.5 km^{2})
- Discharge
  - location: Broadkill River
  - average: 1.59 cu ft/s (0.045 m^{3}/s) at mouth with Broadkill River

Basin features
- Progression: Broadkill River → Delaware Bay → Atlantic Ocean
- River system: Broadkill River
- Tributaries
  - left: unnamed tributaries
  - right: unnamed tributaries
- Bridges: DE 1, Steamboat Landing Road

Doty Glade is a 1.72 mi (2.77 km) long first-order tributary to the Broadkill River in Sussex County, Delaware.

== Course ==
Doty Glade rises on the Beaverdam Creek divide about 1 mi (1.6 km) south of Steamboat Landing, Delaware, and then flows generally northeast to join the Broadkill River about 0.5 mi (0.80 km) northeast of Steamboat Landing, Delaware.

== Watershed ==
Doty Glade drains 2.44 square miles (6.3 km^{2}) of area, receives about 45.3 in/year of precipitation, and is about 14.75% forested.

== See also ==
- List of rivers of Delaware
