= Horsepen Arm =

Stream in Delaware, USA

Horsepen Arm Tributary to Marshyhope Creek
- Location of Horsepen Arm mouth Horsepen Arm (the United States)

Location
- Country: United States
- State: Delaware
- County: Kent

Physical characteristics
- Source: Marsh Branch divide
  - location: about 0.5 miles east of Anthonys Corner, Delaware
  - coordinates: 38°58′52.00″N 075°40′10.00″W
  - elevation: 60 ft (18 m)
- Mouth: Marshyhope Creek
  - location: Hollandsville, Delaware
  - coordinates: 38°55′17.41″N 075°38′21.74″W
  - elevation: 49 ft (15 m)
- Length: 5.54 mi (8.92 km)
- Basin size: 6.97 square miles (18.1 km^{2})
- Discharge
  - location: Marshyhope Creek
  - average: 8.41 cu ft/s (0.238 m^{3}/s) at mouth with Marshyhope Creek

Basin features
- Progression: Marshyhope Creek → Nanticoke River → Chesapeake Bay → Atlantic Ocean
- River system: Nanticoke River
- Tributaries
  - left: unnamed tributaries
  - right: unnamed tributaries
- Bridges: Fox Hunters Road, Whiteleysburg Road

Horsepen Arm is a 5.54 mi (8.92 km) long second-order tributary to Marshyhope Creek in Kent County, Delaware. This is the only stream of this name in the United States.

== Course ==
Horsepen Arm rises on the Marsh Branch divide about 0.5 miles east of Anthonys Corner, Delaware, and then flows generally southeast to join Marshyhope Creek at Hollandsville, Delaware.

== Watershed ==
Horsepen Arm drains 6.97 square miles (18.1 km^{2}) of area, receives about 44.8 in/year of precipitation, and is about 6.45% forested.

== See also ==
- List of rivers of Delaware
