= Ramsey Run (Brandywine Creek tributary) =

Stream in Delaware, USA

Ramsey Run Tributary to Brandywine Creek
- Location of Ramsey Run mouth Ramsey Run (Brandywine Creek tributary) (the United States)

Location
- Country: United States
- State: Delaware
- County: New Castle

Physical characteristics
- Source: Hurricane Run divide
  - location: about 0.5 miles southeast of Beaver Valley, Delaware
  - coordinates: 39°49′39″N 075°33′20″W
  - elevation: 340 ft (100 m)
- Mouth: Brandywine Creek
  - location: about 0.5 miles southwest of Beaver Valley, Delaware
  - coordinates: 39°49′43″N 075°34′21″W
  - elevation: 148 ft (45 m)
- Discharge
  - location: Brandywine Creek

Basin features
- Progression: west
- River system: Delaware River
- Tributaries
  - left: unnamed tributaries
  - right: unnamed tributaries
- Bridges: Ramsey Road

Ramsey Run is a 1st order tributary to Brandywine Creek in New Castle County, Delaware.

== Course ==
Ramsey Run rises about 0.5 miles southeast of Beaver Valley, Delaware, and then flows west to join Brandywine Creek about 0.5 miles southwest of Beaver Valley, Delaware.

== See also ==
- List of Delaware rivers
