= Double Fork Branch (Marshyhope Creek tributary) =

Stream in Delaware, USA

Double Fork Branch Tributary to Marshyhope Creek
- Location of Double Fork Branch mouth Double Fork Branch (Marshyhope Creek tributary) (the United States)

Location
- Country: United States
- State: Delaware
- County: Sussex

Physical characteristics
- Source: Cart Branch divide
  - location: about 1-mile west-northwest of Greenwood, Delaware
  - coordinates: 38°48′55.00″N 075°37′39.00″W
  - elevation: 50 ft (15 m)
- Mouth: Marshyhope Creek
  - location: about 0.5 miles north of Woodenhawk, Delaware
  - coordinates: 38°48′24.41″N 075°41′21.75″W
  - elevation: 26 ft (7.9 m)
- Length: 3.03 mi (4.88 km)
- Basin size: 4.68 square miles (12.1 km^{2})
- Discharge
  - location: Marshyhope Creek
  - average: 5.74 cu ft/s (0.163 m^{3}/s) at mouth with Marshyhope Creek

Basin features
- Progression: Marshyhope Creek → Nanticoke River → Chesapeake Bay → Atlantic Ocean
- River system: Nanticoke River
- Tributaries
  - left: Parker and Sampson Ditch
  - right: unnamed tributaries
- Bridges: Blanchard Road, Double Fork Road

Double Fork Branch is a 3.03 mi (4.88 km) long second-order tributary to Marshyhope Creek in Sussex County, Delaware.

== Course ==
Double Fork Branch rises on the Cart Branch divide about 1-mile west-northwest of Greenwood, Delaware, and then flows generally west-southwest to join Marshyhope Creek about 0.5 miles north of Woodenhawk, Delaware.

== Watershed ==
Double Fork Branch drains 4.68 square miles (12.1 km^{2}) of area, receives about 45.0 in/year of precipitation, and is about 12.2% forested.

== See also ==
- List of rivers of Delaware
