= Whartons Branch (Indian River tributary) =

Whartons Branch Tributary to Indian River
- Location within Delaware Location within the United States

Location
- Country: United States
- State: Delaware
- County: Sussex

Physical characteristics
- Source: Unity Branch divide
  - location: about 0.1 miles south of Mission, Delaware
  - coordinates: 38°32′47″N 075°17′04″W
  - elevation: 40 ft (12 m)
- Mouth: Indian River
  - location: Old Landing, Delaware
  - coordinates: 38°34′57″N 075°16′08″W
  - elevation: 0 ft (0 m)
- Length: 4.85 mi (7.81 km)
- Basin size: 15.60 square miles (40.4 km^{2})
- Discharge
  - average: 18.43 cu ft/s (0.522 m^{3}/s) at mouth with Indian River

Basin features
- Progression: various, but generally north
- River system: Indian River
- Tributaries
  - left: Iron Branch
  - right: unnamed tributaries
- Bridges: Gum Tree Road; US 113; Dagsboro Road; Iron Branch Road

Whartons Branch is a 4.85 mi (7.81 km) long 2nd order tributary to Indian River, in Sussex County, Delaware.

== Variant names ==
According to the Geographic Names Information System, it has also been known historically as:

- Whartin's Branch

== Course ==
Whartons Branch rises on the Unity Branch divide about 0.1 miles south of Mission in Sussex County, Delaware. Whartons Branch then flows in a semi-circular route before turning north to meet Indian River at Old Landing, Delaware.

== Watershed ==
Whartons Branch drains 15.60 square miles (40.4 km^{2}) of area, receives about 45.0 in/year of precipitation, has a topographic wetness index of 827.12 and is about 5.4% forested.

== See also ==
- List of rivers of Delaware
