= Lee Joseph Creek =

Tributary in Sussex County, Delaware

Lee Joseph Creek Tributary to Rehoboth Bay
- Location within Delaware Location within the United States

Location
- Country: United States
- State: Delaware
- County: Sussex

Physical characteristics
- Source: Lingo Creek divide
  - location: about 0.1 miles south of Bay City, Delaware
  - coordinates: 38°37′40″N 075°07′12″W
  - elevation: 02 ft (0.61 m)
- Mouth: Rehoboth Bay
  - location: Bay City, Delaware
  - coordinates: 38°37′40″N 075°07′57″W
  - elevation: 0 ft (0 m)
- Length: 0.42 mi (0.68 km)
- Basin size: 0.34 square miles (0.88 km^{2})
- Discharge
  - average: 0.41 cu ft/s (0.012 m^{3}/s) at mouth with Rehoboth Bay

Basin features
- Progression: northeast
- River system: Rehoboth Bay
- Tributaries
  - left: unnamed tributaries
  - right: unnamed tributaries
- Bridges: none

Lee Joseph Creek is a 0.42 mi (0.68 km) long 1st order tributary to Rehoboth Bay in Sussex County, Delaware. This stream is tidal for most of its course.

== Course ==
Lee Joseph Creek rises on the Indian River divide, about 0.1 miles south of Bay City in Sussex County, Delaware. Lee Joseph Creek then flows northeast to meet Rehoboth Bay about at Bay City, Delaware.

== Watershed ==
Lee Joseph Creek drains 0.34 square miles (0.88 km^{2}) of area, receives about 44.8 in/year of precipitation, has a topographic wetness index of 648.38 and is about 0.50% forested.

== See also ==
- List of rivers of Delaware
