= Dirickson Creek (Little Assawoman Bay tributary) =

Dirickson Creek Tributary to Little Assawoman Bay
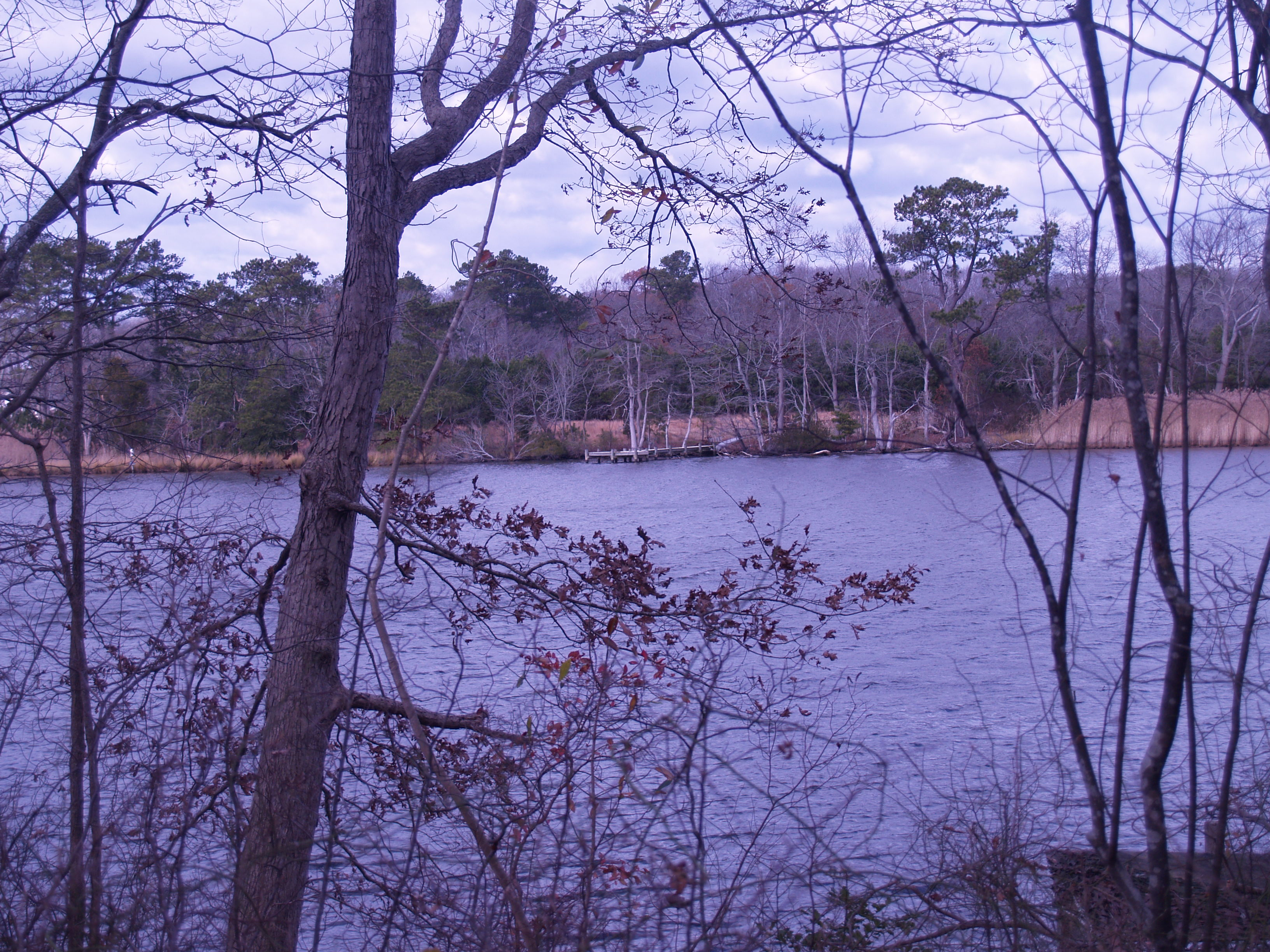
- Dirickson Creek north of Fenwick West, Delaware

- Location within Delaware Location within the United States

Location
- Country: United States
- State: Delaware
- County: Sussex

Physical characteristics
- Source: confluence of Batson Branch and Bearhole Ditch
  - location: about 0.25 miles northwest of Fenwick West, Delaware
  - coordinates: 38°28′50″N 075°08′08″W
  - elevation: 8 ft (2.4 m)
- Mouth: Little Assawoman Bay
  - location: Laws Point, Delaware
  - coordinates: 38°29′02″N 075°04′54″W
  - elevation: 0 ft (0 m)
- Length: 3.64 mi (5.86 km)
- Basin size: 18.37 square miles (47.6 km^{2})
- Discharge
  - average: 20.95 cu ft/s (0.593 m^{3}/s) at mouth with Little Assawoman Bay

Basin features
- Progression: east
- River system: Little Assawoman Bay
- Tributaries
  - left: Batson Branch; Agricultural Ditch; Williams Creek
  - right: Bearhole Ditch
- Bridges: Old Mill Bridge Road

Dirickson Creek is a 3.64 mi (5.86 km) long 3rd order tributary to Little Assawoman Bay, in Sussex County, Delaware.

== Variant names ==
According to the Geographic Names Information System, it has also been known historically as:

- Williams Creek

== Course ==
Dirickson Creek is formed at the confluence of Batson Branch and Bearhole Ditch about 0.25 miles northwest of Fenwick West in Sussex County, Delaware. Dirickson Creek then flows east to meet Little Assawoman Bay at Laws Point, Delaware.

== Watershed ==
Dirickson Creek drains 18.37 square miles (47.6 km^{2}) of area, receives about 44.7 in/year of precipitation, has a topographic wetness index of 714.69 and is about 4.9% forested.

== See also ==
- List of rivers of Delaware
