= Beaver Gut Ditch =

Stream in Delaware, USA

Beaver Gut Ditch Tributary to St. Jones River
- Location of Beaver Gut Ditch mouth Beaver Gut Ditch (the United States)

Location
- Country: United States
- State: Delaware
- County: Kent

Physical characteristics
- Source: Thorndyk Branch divide
  - location: Pond about 0.25 miles west of Magnolia, Delaware
  - coordinates: 39°04′26″N 075°29′03″W
  - elevation: 20 ft (6.1 m)
- Mouth: St. Jones River
  - location: Florence, Delaware
  - coordinates: 39°05′09″N 075°29′03″W
  - elevation: 0 ft (0 m)
- Length: 1.36 mi (2.19 km)
- Basin size: 1.79 square miles (4.6 km^{2})
- Discharge
  - location: St. Jones River
  - average: 2.14 cu ft/s (0.061 m^{3}/s) at mouth with St. Jones River

Basin features
- Progression: northeast
- River system: St. Jones River
- Tributaries
  - left: unnamed tributaries
  - right: unnamed tributaries
- Bridges: South State Street, Ponderosa Drive

Beaver Gut Ditch is a 1.36 mi (2.19 km) long 1st order tributary to St. Jones River in Kent County, Delaware.

== Course ==
Beaver Gut Ditch rises in a pond on the Thorndyk Branch divide about 0.25 miles west of Magnolia in Kent County, Delaware. Beaver Gut Ditch then flows northeast to meet the St. Jones River at Florence, Delaware.

== Watershed ==
Beaver Gut Ditch drains 1.79 square miles (4.6 km^{2}) of area, receives about 44.8 in/year of precipitation, has a topographic wetness index of 579.16 and is about 5.1% forested.

== See also ==
- List of Delaware rivers

== Maps ==
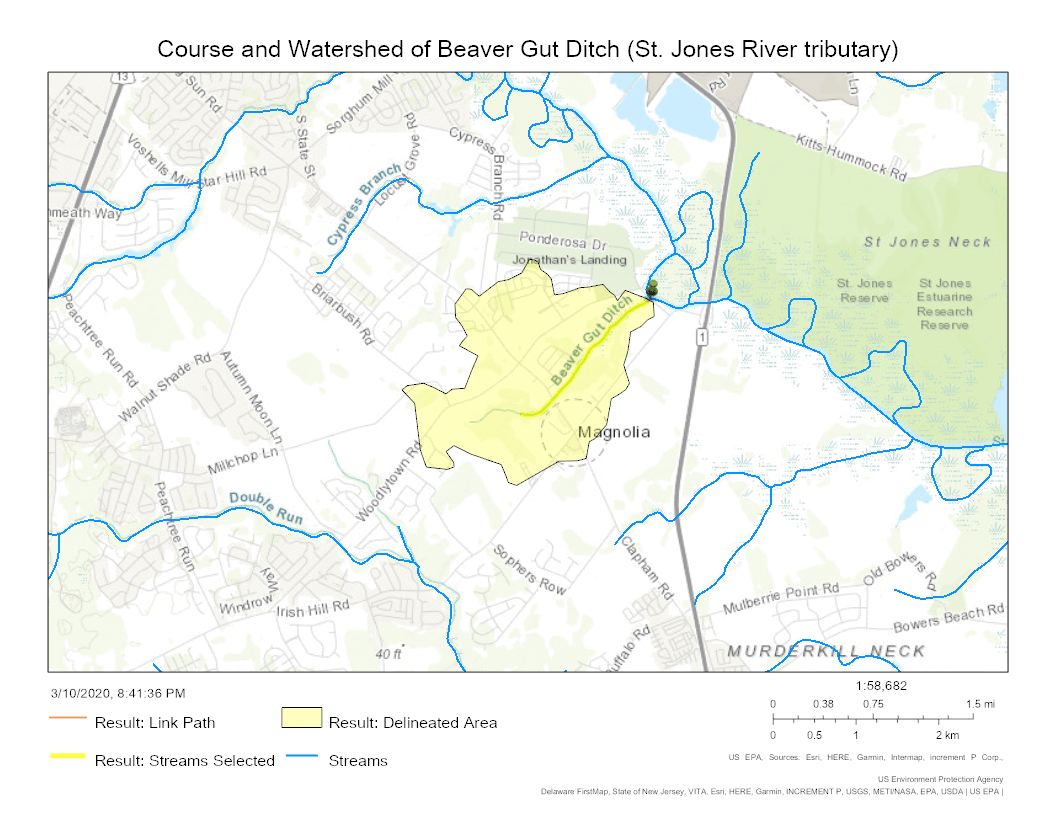
Course and Watershed of Beaver Gut Ditch (St. Jones River tributary)
