= Canary Creek (Broadkill River tributary) =

Stream in Delaware, United States

Canary Creek Tributary to Broadkill River
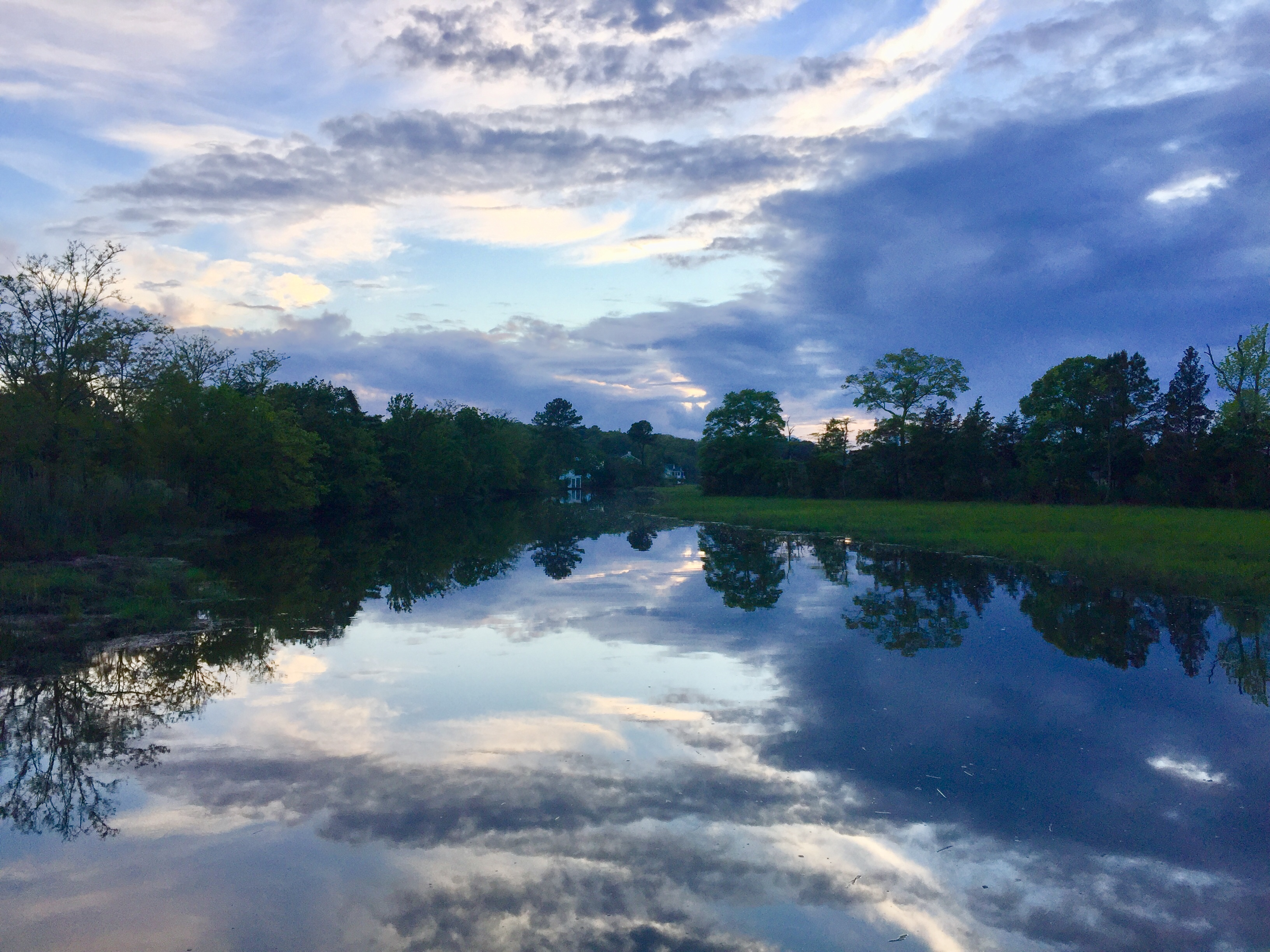

- Location of Canary Creek mouth Canary Creek (Broadkill River tributary) (the United States)

Location
- Country: United States
- State: Delaware
- County: Sussex

Physical characteristics
- Source: Wolfe Glade divide
  - location: Lewes, Delaware
  - coordinates: 38°45′59.88″N 075°08′08.59″W
  - elevation: 10 ft (3.0 m)
- Mouth: Broadkill River
  - location: about 1-mile northwest of Lewes, Delaware
  - coordinates: 38°47′24.40″N 075°09′48.66″W
  - elevation: 0 ft (0 m)
- Length: 4.09 mi (6.58 km)
- Basin size: 4.81 square miles (12.5 km^{2})
- Discharge
  - location: Broadkill River
  - average: 5.81 cu ft/s (0.165 m^{3}/s) at mouth with Broadkill River

Basin features
- Progression: Broadkill River → Delaware Bay → Atlantic Ocean
- River system: Broadkill River
- Tributaries
  - left: Ebenezer Branch
  - right: unnamed tributaries
- Bridges: Savannah Road, New Road, Pilottown Road

Canary Creek is a 4.09 mi (6.58 km) long first-order tributary to the Broadkill River in Sussex County, Delaware.

== Course ==
Canary Creek rises on the Wolfe Glade divide in Lewes, Delaware, and then flows generally northwest to join the Broadkill River about 1-mile northwest of Lewes, Delaware.

== Variant names ==
According to the Geographic Names Information System, it has also been known historically as:

- Canarical Creek
- Canarikill
- Pagan Creek

== Watershed ==
Canary Creek drains 4.81 square miles (12.5 km^{2}) of area, receives about 45.4 in/year of precipitation, and is about 3.19% forested.

== See also ==
- List of rivers of Delaware
