= Lingo Point =

Landform in Delaware

Coordinates: 38°36′22″N 75°09′16″W

Lingo Point, Delaware is a point of land at the mouth of Lingo Creek at the western limit of Indian River Bay, 7.5 miles northeast of Frankford in Sussex County, Delaware; a variant of the name is Lingos Point.
