= List of rivers of Delaware =

List of rivers in Delaware (U.S. state), grouped by type and sorted by name.

== Major rivers and creeks (28) ==
- Appoquinimink River
- Blackbird Creek
- Brandywine Creek
- Broad Creek
- Broadkill River
- Choptank River
- Christina River
- Delaware River
- Hershey Run
- Indian River
- Leipsic River
- Lingo Creek
- Little River
- Marshyhope Creek
- Mill Creek
- Mispillion River
- Murderkill River
- Naamans Creek
- Nanticoke River
- Pepper Creek
- Pocomoke River
- Red Clay Creek
- St. Jones River
- Sassafras River
- Shellpot Creek
- Simons River
- Smyrna River
- White Clay Creek

== All named streams (437) ==
- Agricultural Ditch, Sussex County
- Ake Ditch, Sussex County
- Alapocas Run, New Castle County
- [[Allabands Mill Stream (Isaac Branch tributary)|Allabands Mill Stream]], Kent County
- Alms House Ditch, Sussex County
- Almshouse Branch, Kent County
- Alston Branch, Kent County
- Angle Rod Creek, New Castle County
- Appoquinimink River, New Castle County
- Army Creek, New Castle County
- Arnell Creek, Sussex County
- Ash Gut, Kent County
- Asketum Branch, Sussex County
- Augustine Creek, New Castle County
- Back Creek, New Castle County
- Bacon Island Creek, Sussex County
- Baker Mill Branch, Sussex County
- Bald Cypress Branch, Sussex County
- Bald Eagle Creek, Sussex County
- Barlow Branch, New Castle County
- Batson Branch, Sussex County
- Beachy Neidig Ditch, Kent County
- Bearhole Ditch, Sussex County
- Beaver Branch, New Castle County
- Beaver Creek, New Castle County
- Beaver Dam Branch, Sussex County
- Beaver Gut Ditch, Kent County
- Beaverdam Creek, Sussex County
- Bee Branch, Sussex County
- Belltown Run, New Castle County
- Bennefield Branch, Kent County
- Big Ditch, The, New Castle County
- Big Mill Branch, Sussex County
- Black Arm Prong, Kent County
- Black Savannah Ditch, Sussex County
- Black Stallion Ditch, New Castle County
- Black Swamp Creek, Kent County
- Blackbird Creek, New Castle County
- Blackwater Creek, Sussex County
- Blackwater Creek, Sussex County
- Blanco Ditch, Kent County
- Bogy Run, New Castle County
- Booth Branch, Kent County
- Bowman Branch, Sussex County
- Brandywine Creek, New Castle County
- Brasures Branch, Sussex County
- Bridgeville Branch, Sussex County
- Bright Haines Glade Branch, Kent County
- Brights Branch, Sussex County
- Brittingham Branch, Sussex County
- Broad Creek, Sussex County
- Broadkill River, Sussex County
- Brockonbridge Gut, Kent County
- Browns Branch, Kent County
- Bucks Branch, Sussex County
- Bullock Prong, Kent County
- Bundicks Branch, Sussex County
- Buntings Branch, Sussex County
- Burrows Run, New Castle County
- Burrsville Branch, Kent County
- Burton Prong, Sussex County
- Butler Mill Branch, Sussex County
- Cahoon Branch, Kent County
- Canary Creek, Sussex County
- Carney Run, New Castle County
- Cart Branch, Sussex County
- Cattail Branch, Kent County
- Cedar Creek, New Castle County
- Cedar Creek, Sussex County
- Chapel Branch, Sussex County
- Chapel Branch, Sussex County
- Cherry Walk Creek, Sussex County
- Chestnut Run, New Castle County
- Choptank River, Kent County
- Christina River, New Castle County
- Church Branch, Sussex County
- Clarksville Branch, Sussex County
- Clear Brook, Sussex County
- Cod Creek, Sussex County
- Coffee Run, New Castle County
- Cohee Prong, Kent County
- Collins Creek, Sussex County
- Connelly Mill Branch, Sussex County
- Cool Branch, Sussex County
- Cooper Branch, Sussex County
- Copper Branch, Kent County
- Corks Point Ditch, New Castle County
- Cow Bridge Branch, Sussex County
- Cow Marsh Creek, Kent County
- Cowhouse Branch, Sussex County
- Crony Pond Branch, Sussex County
- Crooked Creek, Sussex County
- Crystal Run, New Castle County
- Culbreth Marsh Ditch, Kent County
- Cypress Branch, Kent County
- Cypress Branch, New Castle County
- Deep Branch, Sussex County
- Deep Branch, Sussex County
- Deep Branch, Sussex County
- Deep Creek, New Castle County
- Deep Creek Sussex County
- Deep Hole Branch, Sussex County
- Delaware River, New Castle County
- Derrickson Ditch, Sussex County
- Devious Branch, Kent County
- Dirickson Creek, Sussex County
- Ditch Creek, Sussex County
- Dogwood Branch, New Castle County
- Doll Run, New Castle County
- Dorman Branch, Sussex County
- Doty Glade, Sussex County
- Double Fork Branch, Sussex County
- Double Run, Kent County
- Dragon Creek, New Castle County
- Drawyer Creek, New Castle County
- Drum Creek, Sussex County
- Duck Creek, Kent County
- Duck Creek, Kent County
- Dukes and Jobs Ditch, Sussex County
- Dukes Ditch, Sussex County
- Dutton Ditch, Sussex County
- Dyke Branch, Kent County
- East Branch Christina River, New Castle County
- Ebenezer Branch, Sussex County
- Eli Walls Ditch, Sussex County
- Elliott Pond Branch, Sussex County
- Fairfield Run, New Castle County
- Fan Branch, Kent County
- Finis Branch, Kent County
- Fisher Creek, Sussex County
- Fishing Branch, Kent County
- Fishing Creek, New Castle County
- Fivefoot Prong, Kent County
- Fork Branch, Kent County
- Fork Number One Pepper Creek, Sussex County
- Freidel Prong, Sussex County
- Gambles Gut, New Castle County
- Georgetown-Vaughn Ditch, Sussex County
- Gilbert Trivitts Ditch, Sussex County
- Gill Branch, Sussex County
- Gills Branch, Sussex County
- Glade Branch, Sussex County
- Gordon Branch, Sussex County
- Goslee Creek, Sussex County
- Graham Branch, Sussex County
- Gravelly Branch, Kent County
- Gravelly Branch, Sussex County
- Gravelly Ditch, Sussex County
- Gravelly Run, Kent County
- Grays Branch, Sussex County
- Grays Prong, Sussex County
- Great Bohemia Creek, New Castle County
- Greens Branch, Kent County
- Green Briar Branch, Sussex County
- Green Creek, Kent County
- Green Spring Branch, New Castle County
- Greenlees Ditch, Kent County
- Green Branch, Kent County
- Grubby Neck Branch, Sussex County
- Guinea Creek, Sussex County
- Gully Camp Ditch, Sussex County
- Gum Branch, Sussex County
- Gum Branch, Sussex County
- Gum Branch, Sussex County
- Guthrie Branch, New Castle County
- Hangmans Run, New Castle County
- Harrington Beaverdam Ditch, Kent County
- Hawkey Branch, Kent County
- Hawks Inlet (historical), Kent County
- Heron Drain, Kent County
- Herring Branch, Kent County
- Herring Branch, New Castle County
- Herring Branch, Sussex County
- Herring Branch, Sussex County
- Herring Creek, Sussex County
- Herring Run, New Castle County
- Herring Run, Sussex County
- Herron Run, Kent County
- Hickman Ditch, Kent County
- Hill Savannah Ditch, Sussex County
- Hitch Pond Branch, Sussex County
- Holland Glade, Sussex County
- Holly Branch, Sussex County
- Hopkins Prong, Kent County
- Hopkins Prong, Sussex County
- Horse Pen Branch, Sussex County
- Horse Pound Swamp Ditch, Sussex County
- Horsepen Arm, Kent County
- Horsepen Ditch, Kent County
- Houston Branch, Sussex County
- Houston-Thorogood Ditch, Sussex County
- Hudson Branch, Kent County
- Hurley Drain, Sussex County
- Hurricane Run, New Castle County
- Husbands Run, New Castle County
- Hyde Run, New Castle County
- Improvement Branch, Kent County
- Indian Branch, Kent County
- Indian River, Sussex County
- Ingram Branch, Kent County
- Ingram Branch, Sussex County
- Ingram Branch, Sussex County
- Iron Branch, Sussex County
- Iron Mine Branch, Sussex County
- Iron Mine Prong, Kent County
- Isaac Branch, Kent County
- Island Creek, Sussex County
- Island Pond Marsh Ditch, Kent County
- Isaac Branch, Kent County
- Jackson Branch, Sussex County
- Jackson Prong, Kent County
- James Branch, Sussex County
- Jamison Branch, Kent County
- Jobs Ditch, Sussex County
- Johnson Branch, Sussex County
- Johnson Branch, Sussex County
- Jones Branch, Sussex County
- Jones Mill Branch, Sussex County
- Jordan Branch, Kent County
- Joy Run, New Castle County
- Kent-Sussex Line Branch, Kent County
- Kings Causeway Branch, Kent County
- Lamborn Run, New Castle County
- Layton-Vaughn Ditch, Sussex County
- Leathermans Run, New Castle County
- Lednum Branch, Kent County
- Lee Joseph Creek, Sussex County
- Leipsic River, Kent County
- Lewes Creek, Sussex County
- Lewis Prong, Sussex County
- Lingo Creek, Sussex County
- Little Creek, Sussex County
- Little Mill Creek, New Castle County
- Little River, Kent County
- Long Branch, Sussex County
- Long Creek, New Castle County
- Long Drain Ditch, Sussex County
- Lost Stream, New Castle County
- Love Creek, Sussex County
- Luther Marvel Prong, Kent County
- Mahon River, Kent County
- Maidstone Branch, Kent County
- Maple Branch, Sussex County
- Maple Marsh and Beaver Dam Branch, Sussex County
- Marshyhope Ditch, Kent County
- Martin Branch, Sussex County
- Massey Branch, New Castle County
- Matson Run, New Castle County
- Mayer Branch, Sussex County
- McColleys Branch, Sussex County
- McCrays Branch, Sussex County
- McGee Ditch, Sussex County
- Meadow Branch, Sussex County
- Meredith Branch, Kent County
- Middle Run, New Castle County
- Mifflin Ditch, Sussex County
- Mill Branch, Sussex County
- Mill Creek, Kent County
- Mill Creek (White Clay Creek tributary), New Castle County
- Mill Creek, New Castle County
- Miller Creek, Sussex County
- Mirey Branch, Sussex County
- Mispillion River, Sussex County
- Mockingbird Creek, Sussex County
- Mockingbird Creek, Sussex County
- Morgan Branch, Kent County
- Morgan Branch, Sussex County
- Morris Branch, New Castle County
- Morris Branch, Sussex County
- Muddy Bottom Ditch, Kent County
- Muddy Branch, Kent County
- Muddy Run, New Castle County
- Mullet Run, Kent County
- Munchy Branch, Sussex County
- Murderkill River, Kent County
- Naamans Creek, New Castle County
- Narrow Ditch, Sussex County
- New Ditch, Sussex County
- Newell Branch, Kent County
- Nonesuch Creek, New Castle County
- North Fork Green Run, Sussex County
- North Prong, Sussex County
- Number One Prong, Sussex County
- Number Two Prong, Kent County
- Old Baptist Church Branch, Kent County
- Old Forge Branch, Sussex County
- Old Mill Creek, Sussex County
- Old Slaughter Creek, Sussex County
- Owens Branch, Sussex County
- Owens Branch, Sussex County
- Parker and Sampson Ditch, Sussex County
- Parker Branch, Sussex County
- Parnell Branch, Kent County
- Paw Paw Branch, New Castle County
- Pemberton Branch, Sussex County
- Penrose Branch, Kent County
- Pepper Branch, Sussex County
- Pepper Creek, Sussex County
- Perch Creek, New Castle County
- Perkins Run, New Castle County
- Persimmon Run, New Castle County
- Peterkins Branch, Sussex County
- Phillips Branch, Sussex County
- Phillips Ditch, Sussex County
- Pigeon Run, New Castle County
- Pike Creek, New Castle County
- Piney Branch, Sussex County
- Pinks Branch, Kent County
- Pipe Elm Branch, Kent County
- Plum Creek, Sussex County
- Point Branch, Kent County
- Polk Branch, Sussex County
- Polly Branch, Sussex County
- Pot Hook Creek, Sussex County
- Powell Ditch, Kent County
- Pratt Branch, Kent County
- Presbyterian Branch, Sussex County
- Price Prong, Kent County
- Primehook Creek, Sussex County
- Prong Number One, Sussex County, Delaware
- Prong Number Two, Kent County
- Prospect Branch, Kent County
- Providence Creek, Kent County
- Puncheon Run, Kent County
- Quarter Branch, Kent County
- Raccoon Ditch, Sussex County
- Raccoon Prong, Sussex County
- Ramsey Run, New Castle County
- Red Clay Creek, New Castle County
- Red House Branch, Kent County
- Red Lion Creek, New Castle County
- Rocky Run, New Castle County
- Rogers Branch, Sussex County
- Ross Prong, Kent County
- Rossakatum Branch, Sussex County
- Round Pole Branch, Sussex County
- Roy Creek, Sussex County
- Rum Bridge Branch, Sussex County
- Saint Georges Creek, New Castle County
- St. Jones River, Kent County
- Sandom Branch, New Castle County
- Sandtown Branch, Kent County
- Sandy Branch, New Castle County
- Sandy Branch, Sussex County
- Sangston Prong, Kent County
- Sarah Run, Sussex County
- Saulsbury Creek, Kent County
- Saunders Branch, Sussex County
- Savannah Ditch, Sussex County
- Sawmill Branch, New Castle County
- Scott Run, New Castle County
- Sewell Branch, Kent County
- Sheep Pen Ditch, Sussex County
- Shellpot Creek, New Castle County
- Shields Prong, Kent County
- Shoals Branch, Sussex County
- Short and Hall Ditch, Sussex County
- Shorts Ditch, Sussex County
- Silver Run, New Castle County
- Simons River, Kent County
- Simpler Branch, Sussex County
- Slaughter Creek, Sussex County
- Smith-Short and Willin Ditch, Sussex County
- Smyrna River, New Castle County
- Snows Branch, Kent County
- Sockorockets Ditch, Sussex County
- South Branch Naamans Creek, New Castle County
- Sowbridge Branch, Sussex County
- Spring Branch, Kent County
- Spring Creek, Kent County
- Spruances Branch, Kent County
- Stallion Head Branch, Sussex County
- Stockley Branch, Sussex County
- Stockley Creek, Sussex County
- Stoney Branch, Sussex County
- Stenkil Creek, New Castle County
- Stump Creek, Sussex County
- Sunset Branch, Sussex County
- Swan Creek, Kent County
- Swan Creek, Sussex County
- Tantrough Branch, Sussex County
- Tanyard Branch, Sussex County
- Tappahanna Ditch, Kent County
- Taylor Branch, Kent County
- Terrapin Pond, Sussex County
- Thompson Branch, Sussex County
- Thorndyk Branch, Kent County
- Tidbury Creek, Kent County
- Tidy Island Creek, Kent County
- Tom Creek, New Castle County
- Tomahawk Branch, Kent County
- Toms Dam Branch, Sussex County
- Tubbs Branch, Sussex County
- Trunk Ditch, Kent County
- Tubmill Branch, Kent County
- Turkey Branch, Sussex County
- Turkey Branch, Sussex County
- Turkey Run, New Castle County
- Turtle Branch, Sussex County
- Tussocky Branch, Sussex County
- Tussocky Branch, Sussex County
- Twiford Meadow Ditch, Sussex County
- Tyndall Branch, Sussex County
- Unity Branch, Sussex County
- Vena Gains Branch, Sussex County
- Vines Creek, Sussex County
- Wall Branch, Sussex County
- Ward Branch, Kent County
- Wards Branch, Sussex County
- Warwick Gut, Sussex County
- Webber Branch, Kent County
- Welsh Branch, Sussex County
- West Branch Christina River, New Castle County
- West Branch Gum Branch, Sussex County
- West Branch Naamans Creek, New Castle County
- Whartons Branch, Sussex County
- Wheeling Branch, Sussex County
- White Clay Creek, New Castle County
- White Creek, Sussex County
- White Marsh Branch, Kent County
- White Marsh Branch, Sussex County
- White Oak Creek, Sussex County
- White Oak Swamp Ditch, Sussex County
- Wildcat Branch, Kent County
- Wiley Branch Ditch, Sussex County
- William H Newton Ditch, Sussex County
- Williams Creek, Sussex County
- Willis Branch, Kent County
- Willow Grove Prong, Kent County
- Willow Run, New Castle County
- Wilson Creek, Sussex County
- Wilson Run, New Castle County
- Wisacco Cipus (historical), New Castle County
- Wolfe Glade, Sussex County
- Wood Duck Run, New Castle County
- Wright Creek, Sussex County

== Rivers and streams by watershed ==
=== Delaware River and Delaware Bay ===
- Naamans Creek
  - South Branch Naamans Creek
- Perkins Run
- Stenkil Creek
  - Fox Kill
- Shellpot Creek
  - Matson Run
  - Turkey Run
- Christina River
  - Brandywine Creek
    - Alapocas Run
    - Husbands Run
      - Willow Run
    - Wilson Run
    - Rocky Run
      - Hurricane Run
    - Carney Run
    - Ramsey Run
    - Beaver Creek
  - Little Mill Creek
    - Chestnut Run
    - Willow Run
  - Nonesuch Creek
  - White Clay Creek
    - Hershey Run
    - Red Clay Creek
      - Hyde Run
        - Coffee Run
      - Burrows Run
    - Mill Creek
    - Pike Creek
    - Middle Run
    - Bogy Run
  - Leathermans Run
  - Belltown Run
    - Muddy Run
  - West Branch Christina River
    - Persimmon Run
  - East Branch Christina River
- Army Creek
- Gambles Gut
- Tom Creek
- Red Lion Creek
  - Doll Run
- Cedar Creek
- Dragon Creek
- Saint Georges Creek
  - Scott Run
  - Joy Run
  - Crystal Run
  - Guthrie Branch
- Augustine Creek
- Silver Run
- Appoquinimink River
- Skunk Hill Ditch
  - The Big Ditch
  - Hangmans Run
  - Drawyer Creek
  - Deep Creek
- Blackbird Creek
  - Mill Creek
  - Fishing Creek
  - Beaver Branch
  - Barlow Branch
  - Sandom Branch
- Angle Rod Creek
- Smyrna River
  - Sawmill Branch
  - Corks Point Ditch
    - Morris Branch
  - Mill Creek
  - Green Spring Branch
    - Massey Branch
  - Duck Creek
    - Greens Branch
    - Providence Creek
      - Paw Paw Branch
- Taylors Gut
- Duck Creek
  - Quarter Gut
    - Hawkey Branch
- Leipsic River
  - Raymond Gut
  - Dyke Branch
  - Bennefield Branch
  - Spruances Branch
  - Snows Branch
  - Alston Branch
  - Willis Branch
  - Taylor Branch
  - Pinks Branch
- Simons River
  - Herring Branch
  - Green Creek
    - Muddy Branch
- Mahon River
  - Old Womans Gut
- Little River
- Lewis Ditch
- Sand Ditch
- St. Jones River
  - Trunk Ditch
  - Beaver Gut Ditch
  - Cypress Branch
  - Tidbury Creek
    - Newell Branch
    - Red House Branch
  - Isaac Branch
    - Almshouse Branch
    - Allabands Mill Stream
  - Puncheon Run
  - Fork Branch
- Murderkill River
  - Spring Creek
    - Double Run
    - Hudson Branch
    - Pratt Branch
  - Ash Gut
  - Browns Branch
    - Ward Branch
    - Indian Branch
  - Spring Branch
  - Black Swamp Creek
  - Beaverdam Branch
  - Fan Branch
- Brockonbridge Gut
- Mispillion River
  - Kings Causeway Branch
  - Fishing Branch
    - Old Baptist Church Branch
  - Swan Creek
    - Tubmill Branch
  - Deep Branch
  - Mullet Run
  - Bowman Branch
  - Lednum Branch
  - Johnson Branch
  - Tantrough Branch
  - Beaverdam Branch
- Cedar Creek
  - Slaughter Creek
  - Beaverdam Branch
  - Church Branch
- Broadkill River
  - Canary Creek
  - Broadkill Sound
    - Primehook Creek
      - North Prong
      - Sowbridge Branch
        - Ingram Branch
  - Old Mill Creek
    - Fisher Creek
    - Black Hog Gut
    - Martin Branch
  - Crooked Creek
  - Doty Glade
  - Beaverdam Creek
  - Round Pole Branch
  - Ingram Branch
    - Dutton Ditch
    - Savannah Ditch
  - Pemberton Branch
    - Brittingham Branch

=== Atlantic coast bays ===
Rehoboth Bay

- Stockley Creek
- Bald Eagle Creek
- White Oak Creek
  - Johnson Branch
- Love Creek
  - Arnell Creek
  - Cherry Walk Creek
  - Dorman Branch
  - Stillman Glade
  - Hetty Fisher Glade
  - Goslee Creek
  - Bundicks Branch
- Herring Creek
  - Wilson Creek
  - Guinea Creek
  - Hopkins Prong
    - Phillips Branch
    - Unity Branch
  - Burton Prong
    - Sarah Run
    - Chapel Branch
      - Wall Branch
- Lee Joseph Creek
- Bacon Island Creek

Indian River Bay

- Lingo Creek
- Indian River
  - Emily Gut
  - Blackwater Creek
  - Pepper Creek
    - Vines Creek
  - Island Creek
  - Warwick Gut
  - Swan Creek
  - Whartons Branch
    - Iron Branch
      - Houston-Thorogood Ditch
      - Wiley Branch
  - Shoals Branch
    - Long Drain Ditch
  - Cow Bridge Branch
    - Stockley Branch
      - Alms House Ditch
      - Horse Pound Swamp Ditch
    - Gills Branch
      - Eli Walls Ditch
        - McGee Ditch
    - Deep Branch
      - Peterkins Branch
      - White Oak Swamp Ditch
      - Simpler Branch
        - Welsh Branch
          - Sockorockets Ditch
  - Sheep Pen Ditch
    - Mirey Branch
      - Narrow Ditch
  - Pepper Creek
    - Blackwater Creek
      - Clarksville Branch
    - Stump Creek
    - Vines Creek
      - Herring Branch
      - Deep Hole Branch
      - McCrays Branch
    - Fork No. 1
- Collins Creek
- White Creek
  - Spring Gut
- Sloughs Gut

Little Assawoman Bay

- Jefferson Creek
- Miller Creek
  - Beaver Dam Ditch
- Dirickson Creek
  - Williams Creek
  - Agricultural Ditch
  - Batson Branch
  - Bearhole Ditch

Assawoman Bay

- Roy Creek
  - Drum Creek

=== Chesapeake Bay ===
- Elk River (Maryland)
  - Perch Creek
  - Bohemia River (MD)
    - Great Bohemia Creek
      - Sandy Branch
  - Back Creek
    - Long Creek
    - Guthrie Run
  - Perch Creek
- Sassafras River
  - Herring Branch
- Chester River (MD)
  - Cypress Branch
    - Dogwood Branch
    - Black Stallion Ditch
  - Andover Branch
    - Sewell Branch
      - Blanco Ditch
      - Jordan Branch
    - Gravelly Run
      - Jamison Branch
      - Muddy Bottom Ditch
- Choptank River
  - Chapel Branch (MD)
    - Garey Mill Pond Branch
      - Hopkins Prong
      - Bullock Prong
      - Price Prong
  - Spring Branch
  - Gravelly Branch
    - Herron Run
    - Shields Prong
    - White Marsh Branch
      - Greenlees Ditch
    - Sangston Prong
  - Sandtown Branch
  - Cow Marsh Creek
    - Meredith Branch
      - Wildcat Branch
      - Horsepen Ditch
    - Jackson Prong
    - Cohee Prong
    - Iron Mine Prong
    - Fivefoot Prong
    - Willow Grove Prong
    - Cow Marsh Ditch
      - Herron Drain
  - Culbreth Marsh Ditch
    - Luther Marvel Prong
    - Beachy Neidig Ditch
    - Ross Prong
    - Powell Ditch
    - Ditch Road Ditch
  - Tidy Island Creek
    - Tappahanna Ditch
    - Harrington Beaverdam Ditch
- Nanticoke River
  - Barren Creek (MD)
    - Mockingbird Creek
  - Marshyhope Creek
    - Tanyard Branch
    - Houston Branch
      - Brights Branch
    - Jones Branch
    - Jones Mill Branch
    - Iron Mine Branch
    - Stafford Ditch
    - Double Fork Branch
      - Parker and Sampson Ditch
    - Short and Hall Ditch
    - Quarter Branch
    - Saulsbury Creek
      - Cattail Branch
    - Green Branch
    - Tomahawk Branch
    - Prospect Branch
      - Point Branch
      - Bright Haines Glade Branch
        - Prong No. 2
    - Beaverdam Branch
    - Horsepen Arm
    - Marshyhope Ditch
    - Black Arm Prong
  - Plum Creek
  - Wright Creek
  - Cod Creek
    - Owens Branch
  - Broad Creek
    - Tussocky Branch
      - Turkey Branch
      - Mill Branch
      - Wheeling Branch
    - Little Creek
      - Meadow Branch
      - Holly Branch
        - Vena Gains Branch
    - Cooper Branch
      - Rossakatum Branch
    - James Branch
      - Old Forge Branch
      - Gordon Branch
      - Hitch Pond Branch
        - Pepper Branch
          - Grays Branch
        - Thompson Branch
          - Raccoon Prong
          - Terrapin Pond
            - Saunders Branch
      - Wards Branch
      - Morris Branch
      - Figgs Ditch
    - Elliott Pond Branch
      - Beaverdam Branch
      - Miry Branch
      - Dukes and Jobs Ditch
      - Tyndall and James Ditch
  - Turtle Branch
  - Gum Branch
  - Lewes Creek
    - Butler Mill Branch
      - Horse Pen Branch
      - Green Briar Branch
    - Chapel Branch
  - Morgan Branch
  - Clear Brook
    - Herring Run
    - William Newton Ditch
    - Bucks Branch
      - Gilbert Truitts Ditch
      - Friedel Prong
    - Swain and Truitt Ditch
  - Deep Creek
    - Tubbs Branch
      - Cool Branch
      - Graham Branch
    - Baker Mill Branch
      - Old Ditch
      - Black Savannah Ditch
    - Deep Gully Ditch
    - Tyndall Branch
      - Stoney Branch
      - Asketum Branch
    - Shorts Ditch
    - Rum Bridge Branch
    - McColleys Branch
      - Layton-Vaughn Ditch
      - Raccoon Ditch
    - Mifflin Ditch
      - Georgetown-Vaughn Ditch
  - Hurley Drain
  - Gravelly Branch
    - Tussocky Branch
    - Smith-Short and Willin Ditch
    - Prong Number One
      - Maple Branch
      - Maple Marsh and Beaver Dam Branch
    - Gravelly Ditch
  - Ake Ditch
  - Turkey Branch
  - Gum Branch
    - Gully Camp Ditch
    - Toms Dam Branch
      - Long Branch
      - Crony Pond Branch
    - West Branch Gum Branch
      - Owens Branch
    - Parkers Branch
    - Stallion Head Branch
  - Bridgeville Branch
  - Polk Branch
    - Grubby Neck Branch
      - Bee Branch
  - Cart Branch
  - White Marsh Branch
    - Booth Branch
  - Kent-Sussex Line Branch
- Wicomico River (MD)
  - North Prong Wicomico River (MD)
    - Leonard Pond Run (MD)
      - Connelly Mill Branch
      - North Prong Leonard Pond Run (MD)
        - Jackson Branch
        - Mayer Branch
- Pocomoke River
  - Green Run (MD)
    - North Fork Green Run
  - Grays Prong
  - Gum Branch
  - Bald Cypress Branch
  - Lewis Prong
  - Grays Prong
  - Tenfoot Ditch
    - Cypress Farms Ditch
  - Cowhouse Branch

== See also ==
- List of rivers in the United States
