= Mockingbird Creek (Barren Creek tributary) =

Stream in Maryland, USA

Mockingbird Creek Tributary to Barren Creek
- Location of Mockingbird Creek mouth Mockingbird Creek (Barren Creek tributary) (the United States)

Location
- Country: United States
- State: Delaware; Maryland
- County: Sussex; Wicomico

Physical characteristics
- Source: Tussocky Branch divide
  - location: about 0.25 miles northeast of Susan Beach Corner, Delaware
  - coordinates: 38°28′29″N 075°38′34″W
  - elevation: 49 ft (15 m)
- Mouth: Barren Creek
  - location: about 1.5 miles west of Mardela Springs, Maryland
  - coordinates: 38°27′46″N 075°42′28″W
  - elevation: 19 ft (5.8 m)
- Length: 4.28 mi (6.89 km)
- Basin size: 6.45 square miles (16.7 km^{2})
- Discharge
  - location: Barren Creek
  - average: 7.28 cu ft/s (0.206 m^{3}/s) at mouth with Barren Creek

Basin features
- Progression: west-southwest
- River system: Nanticoke River
- Tributaries
  - left: unnamed tributaries
  - right: unnamed tributaries
- Bridges: Susan Beach Road, Columbia Road, Family Pride Way, Delmar Road

Mockingbird Creek is a 4.28 mi (6.89 km) long 2nd tributary to Barren Creek in Wicomico County, Maryland.

== Course ==
Mockingbird Creek rises about 0.25 miles northeast of Susan Beach Corner in Sussex County, Delaware and then flows west-southwest into Wicomico County, Maryland to join Barren Creek about 1.5 miles west of Mardela Springs.

== Watershed ==
Mockingbird Creek drains 6.45 square miles (16.7 km^{2}) of area, receives about 44.5 in/year of precipitation, has a topographic wetness index of 707.04 and is about 14% forested.

== See also ==
- List of Delaware rivers
- List of Maryland rivers
