= Swan Creek (Indian River tributary) =

Indian river tributary

Swan Creek Tributary to Indian River Bay
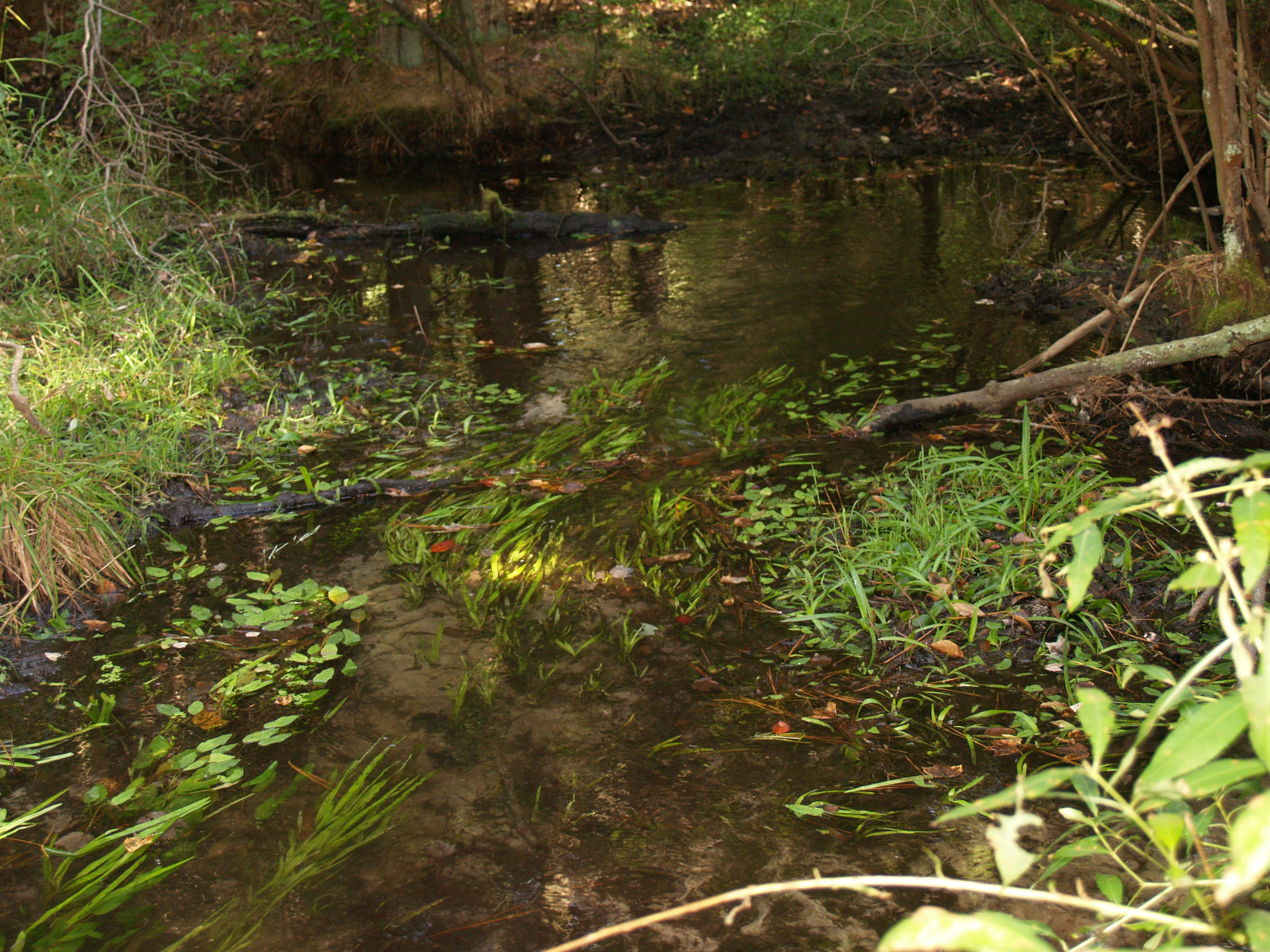
- Swan Creek in Sussex County, Delaware

- Location within Delaware Location within the United States

Location
- Country: United States
- State: Delaware
- County: Sussex

Physical characteristics
- Source: Unity Branch divide
  - location: about 1 mile southwest of Hollyville, Delaware
  - coordinates: 38°39′03″N 075°16′18″W
  - elevation: 36 ft (11 m)
- Mouth: Indian River
  - location: Fishing Point, Delaware
  - coordinates: 38°35′22″N 075°15′02″W
  - elevation: 0 ft (0 m)
- Length: 5.40 mi (8.69 km)
- Basin size: 9.63 square miles (24.9 km^{2})
- Discharge
  - average: 11.34 cu ft/s (0.321 m^{3}/s) at mouth with Indian River

Basin features
- Progression: south
- River system: Indian River
- Tributaries
  - left: unnamed tributaries
  - right: unnamed tributaries
- Waterbodies: Waples Pond; Longwood Pond
- Bridges: Zoar Road; Hollyville Road; Mt Joy Road; Maryland Camp Road; DE 24

Swan Creek is a 5.40 mi (8.69 km) long 2nd order tributary to Indian River in Sussex County, Delaware.

== Course ==
Swan Creek rises on the Unity Branch divide, about 1 mile southwest of Hollyville in Sussex County, Delaware. Swan Creek then flows south to meet Indian River at Fishing Point.

== Watershed ==
Swan Creek drains 9.63 square miles (24.9 km^{2}) of area, receives about 45.0 in/year of precipitation, has a topographic wetness index of 704.54 and is about 29.61% forested.

== See also ==
- List of rivers of Delaware
