= Plum Creek (Nanticoke River tributary) =

Stream in Maryland, USA

Plum Creek Tributary to Nanticoke River
- Location of Plum Creek mouth Plum Creek (Nanticoke River tributary) (the United States)

Location
- Country: United States
- State: Delaware; Maryland
- County: Sussex; Wicomico

Physical characteristics
- Source: Mill Branch divide
  - location: Columbia, Delaware
  - coordinates: 38°30′13″N 075°40′07″W
  - elevation: 46 ft (14 m)
- Mouth: Nanticoke River
  - location: about 0.5 miles north of Riverton, Maryland
  - coordinates: 38°32′07″N 075°44′46″W
  - elevation: 0 ft (0 m)
- Length: 5.56 mi (8.95 km)
- Basin size: 5.45 square miles (14.1 km^{2})
- Discharge
  - location: Nanticoke River
  - average: 6.03 cu ft/s (0.171 m^{3}/s) at mouth with Nanticoke River

Basin features
- Progression: Nanticoke River → Chesapeake Bay → Atlantic Ocean
- River system: Nanticoke River
- Tributaries
  - left: unnamed tributaries
  - right: unnamed tributaries
- Bridges: Columbia Road, San Domingo Road, MD 313

Plum Creek is a 5.56 mi (8.95 km) long 2nd tributary to the Nanticoke River in Wicomico County, Maryland.

== Variant names ==
According to the Geographic Names Information System, it has also been known historically as:

- Plumb Creek

== Course ==
Plum Creek rises in Columbia in Sussex County, Delaware and then flows northwest into Wicomico County, Maryland to join the Nanticoke River about 0.5 miles north of Riverton.

== Watershed ==
Plum Creek drains 5.45 square miles (14.1 km^{2}) of area, receives about 44.3 in/year of precipitation, has a topographic wetness index of 627.39 and is about 13% forested.

== See also ==
- List of Delaware rivers
- List of Maryland rivers
