= Jones Mill Branch =

Stream in Delaware, USA

Jones Mill Branch Tributary to Marshyhope Creek
- Location of Jones Mill Branch mouth Jones Mill Branch (the United States)

Location
- Country: United States
- State: Delaware
- County: Sussex

Physical characteristics
- Source: Bridgeville Branch divide
  - location: about 0.5 miles northeast of Jacobs Crossroads, Delaware
  - coordinates: 38°45′13.00″N 075°39′35.00″W
  - elevation: 58 ft (18 m)
- Mouth: Marshyhope Creek
  - location: about 1.5 miles east-northeast of Smithville, Maryland
  - coordinates: 38°46′31.41″N 075°42′28.75″W
  - elevation: 20 ft (6.1 m)
- Length: 2.78 mi (4.47 km)
- Basin size: 2.93 square miles (7.6 km^{2})
- Discharge
  - location: Marshyhope Creek
  - average: 3.50 cu ft/s (0.099 m^{3}/s) at mouth with Marshyhope Creek

Basin features
- Progression: Marshyhope Creek → Nanticoke River → Chesapeake Bay → Atlantic Ocean
- River system: Nanticoke River
- Tributaries
  - left: unnamed tributaries
  - right: unnamed tributaries
- Bridges: Dublin Hill Road, Trinity Church Road, Buck Fever Road, Sand Hill Road

Jones Mill Branch is a 2.78 mi (4.47 km) long second-order tributary to Marshyhope Creek in Sussex County, Delaware.

== Course ==
Jones Mill Branch rises on the Bridgeville Branch divide about 0.5 miles northeast of Jacobs Crossroads, Delaware, and then flows generally west-northwest to join Marshyhope Creek about 1.5 miles east-northeast of Smithville, Maryland.

== Watershed ==
Jones Mill Branch drains 2.93 square miles (7.6 km^{2}) of area, receives about 44.8 in/year of precipitation, and is about 6.55% forested.

== See also ==
- List of rivers of Delaware
