= Kent-Sussex Line Branch =

Stream in Delaware, USA

Kent-Sussex Line Branch Tributary to Nanticoke River
- Location of Kent-Sussex Line Branch mouth Kent-Sussex Line Branch (the United States)

Location
- Country: United States
- State: Delaware
- County: Sussex; Kent

Physical characteristics
- Source: Beaverdam Branch divide
  - location: about 1 mile south of Six Forks, Delaware
  - coordinates: 38°52′13″N 075°32′05″W
  - elevation: 55 ft (17 m)
- Mouth: Nanticoke River
  - location: about 2 miles northeast of Greenwood, Delaware
  - coordinates: 38°50′08″N 075°33′16″W
  - elevation: 49 ft (15 m)
- Length: 3.50 mi (5.63 km)
- Basin size: 4.43 square miles (11.5 km^{2})
- Discharge
  - location: Nanticoke River
  - average: 5.61 cu ft/s (0.159 m^{3}/s) at mouth with Nanticoke River

Basin features
- Progression: Nanticoke River → Chesapeake Bay → Atlantic Ocean
- River system: Nanticoke River
- Tributaries
  - left: unnamed tributaries
  - right: unnamed tributaries
- Bridges: Mesibov Road (x2), Staytonville Road

Kent-Sussex Line Branch is a 3.50 mi (5.63 km) long 2nd order tributary to the Nanticoke River in Sussex County, Delaware. The lower part of this branch flows along the Kent and Sussex County line, hence the name.

== Variant names ==
According to the Geographic Names Information System, it has also been known historically as:

- Beaverdam Ditch

== Course ==
Kent-Sussex Line Branch rises about 1 mile south of Six Forks, Delaware in Kent County and then flows south-southwest into Sussex County to join the Nanticoke River about 2 miles northeast of Greenwood.

== Watershed ==
Kent-Sussex Line Branch drains 4.49 square miles (11.6 km^{2}) of area, receives about 45.6 in/year of precipitation, has a topographic wetness index of 751.96 and is about 9% forested.

== See also ==
- List of Delaware rivers
