= Goslee Creek (Love Creek tributary) =

Goslee Creek Tributary to Love Creek
- Location within Delaware Location within the United States

Location
- Country: United States
- State: Delaware
- County: Sussex

Physical characteristics
- Source: Black Hog Gut divide
  - location: about 0.25 miles north of Jimtown, Delaware
  - coordinates: 38°44′11″N 075°10′57″W
  - elevation: 14 ft (4.3 m)
- Mouth: Love Creek
  - location: Goslee Millpond
  - coordinates: 38°43′26″N 075°11′16″W
  - elevation: 3 ft (0.91 m)
- Length: 1.38 mi (2.22 km)
- Basin size: 3.65 square miles (9.5 km^{2})
- Discharge
  - average: 4.41 cu ft/s (0.125 m^{3}/s) at mouth with Love Creek

Basin features
- Progression: south-southwest
- River system: Rehoboth Bay
- Tributaries
  - left: unnamed tributaries
  - right: unnamed tributaries
- Bridges: Jimtown Road

Goslee Creek is a 1.38 mi (2.22 km) long 1st order tributary to Love Creek, in Sussex County, Delaware.

== Variant names ==
According to the Geographic Names Information System, it has also been known historically as:

- Gosling Creek

== Course ==
Goslee Creek rises on the Black Hog Gut divide about 0.25 miles north of Jimtown in Sussex County, Delaware. Goslee Creek then flows south-southwest to meet Love Creek within Goslee Millpond.

== Watershed ==
Goslee Creek drains 3.65 square miles (9.5 km^{2}) of area, receives about 45.4 in/year of precipitation, has a topographic wetness index of 653.10 and is about 10.3% forested.

== See also ==
- List of rivers of Delaware
