= Deep Creek (Appoquinimink River tributary) =

Deep Creek Tributary to Appoquinimink River
- Location within Delaware Location within the United States

Location
- Country: United States
- State: Delaware
- County: New Castle

Physical characteristics
- Source: Bohemia River divide
  - location: about 1 mile southwest of Middletown, Delaware
  - coordinates: 39°25′18″N 075°44′58″W
  - elevation: 45 ft (14 m)
- Mouth: Appoquinimink River
  - location: about 1.5 miles southwest of Odessa, Delaware
  - coordinates: 39°26′20″N 075°40′44″W
  - elevation: 0 ft (0 m)
- Length: 4.22 mi (6.79 km)
- Basin size: 7.52 square miles (19.5 km^{2})
- Discharge
  - average: 8.60 cu ft/s (0.244 m^{3}/s) at mouth with Appoquinimink River

Basin features
- Progression: generally east
- River system: Appoquinimink River
- Tributaries
  - left: unnamed tributaries
  - right: unnamed tributaries
- Waterbodies: Silver Lake
- Bridges: Levels Road, DE 71, Silver Lake Road

Deep Creek is a 4.22 mi (6.79 km) long 2nd order tributary to the Appoquinimink River in New Castle County, Delaware.

== Variant names ==
According to the Geographic Names Information System, it has also been known historically as:

- North Appoquinimink River

== Course ==
Deep Creek rises on the Bohemia River divide about 1 mile southwest of Middletown in New Castle County, Delaware. Deep Creek then flows east to meet the Appoquinimink River about 1.5 miles southwest of Odessa, Delaware.

== Watershed ==
Deep Creek drains 7.52 square miles (19.5 km^{2}) of area, receives about 43.2 in/year of precipitation, has a topographic wetness index of 632.96 and is about 2.5% forested.

== See also ==
- List of rivers of Delaware
