= Warwick Gut (Indian River tributary) =

Warwick Gut Tributary to Indian River
- Location within Delaware Location within the United States

Location
- Country: United States
- State: Delaware
- County: Sussex

Physical characteristics
- Source: Swan Creek divide
  - location: about 0.25 miles north of Warwick, Delaware
  - coordinates: 38°36′33″N 075°13′38″W
  - elevation: 18 ft (5.5 m)
- Mouth: Indian River
  - location: about 0.1 miles west of Gull Point, Delaware
  - coordinates: 38°35′28″N 075°13′09″W
  - elevation: 0 ft (0 m)
- Length: 1.52 mi (2.45 km)
- Basin size: 1.63 square miles (4.2 km^{2})
- Discharge
  - average: 1.93 cu ft/s (0.055 m^{3}/s) at mouth with Indian River

Basin features
- Progression: south
- River system: Indian River
- Tributaries
  - left: unnamed tributaries
  - right: unnamed tributaries
- Bridges: DE 24

Warwick Gut is a 1.52 mi (2.45 km) long 1st order tributary to Indian River in Sussex County, Delaware.

== Course ==
Warwick Gut rises on the Swan Creek divide, about 0.25 miles north of Warwick in Sussex County, Delaware. Warwick Gut then flows south to meet Indian River about 0.1 miles west of Gull Point.

== Watershed ==
Warwick Gut drains 1.63 square miles (4.2 km^{2}) of area, receives about 44.9 in/year of precipitation, has a topographic wetness index of 640.69 and is about 18.3% forested.

== See also ==
- List of rivers of Delaware
