= Spring Branch (Murderkill River tributary) =

Stream in Delaware, USA

Spring Branch Tributary to Murderkill River
- Location of Spring Branch mouth Spring Branch (Murderkill River tributary) (the United States)

Location
- Country: United States
- State: Delaware
- County: Kent

Physical characteristics
- Source: Fan Branch divide
  - location: about 0.5 miles south of Felton, Delaware
  - coordinates: 38°59′32″N 075°33′59″W
  - elevation: 53 ft (16 m)
- Mouth: Murderkill River
  - location: about 0.5 miles southeast of Roesville, Delaware
  - coordinates: 38°59′23″N 075°31′26″W
  - elevation: 7 ft (2.1 m)
- Length: 2.63 mi (4.23 km)
- Basin size: 2.69 square miles (7.0 km^{2})
- Discharge
  - location: Murderkill River
  - average: 3.30 cu ft/s (0.093 m^{3}/s) at mouth with Murderkill River

Basin features
- Progression: Murderkill River → Delaware Bay → Atlantic Ocean
- River system: Murderkill River
- Tributaries
  - left: unnamed tributaries
  - right: unnamed tributaries
- Bridges: US 13, Chimney Hill Road, Scrap Tavern Road

Spring Branch is a 2.63 mi (4.23 km) long 1st order tributary to the Murderkill River in Kent County, Delaware.

== Course ==
Spring Branch rises on the Fan Branch divide about 1 mile south of Felton, Delaware. Spring Branch then flows east to meet the Murderkill River about 0.5 miles southeast of Roesville, Delaware.

== Watershed ==
Spring Branch drains 2.69 square miles (7.0 km^{2}) of area, receives about 45.1 in/year of precipitation, has a topographic wetness index of 569.99 and is about 9.8% forested.

== See also ==
- List of Delaware rivers

== Maps ==
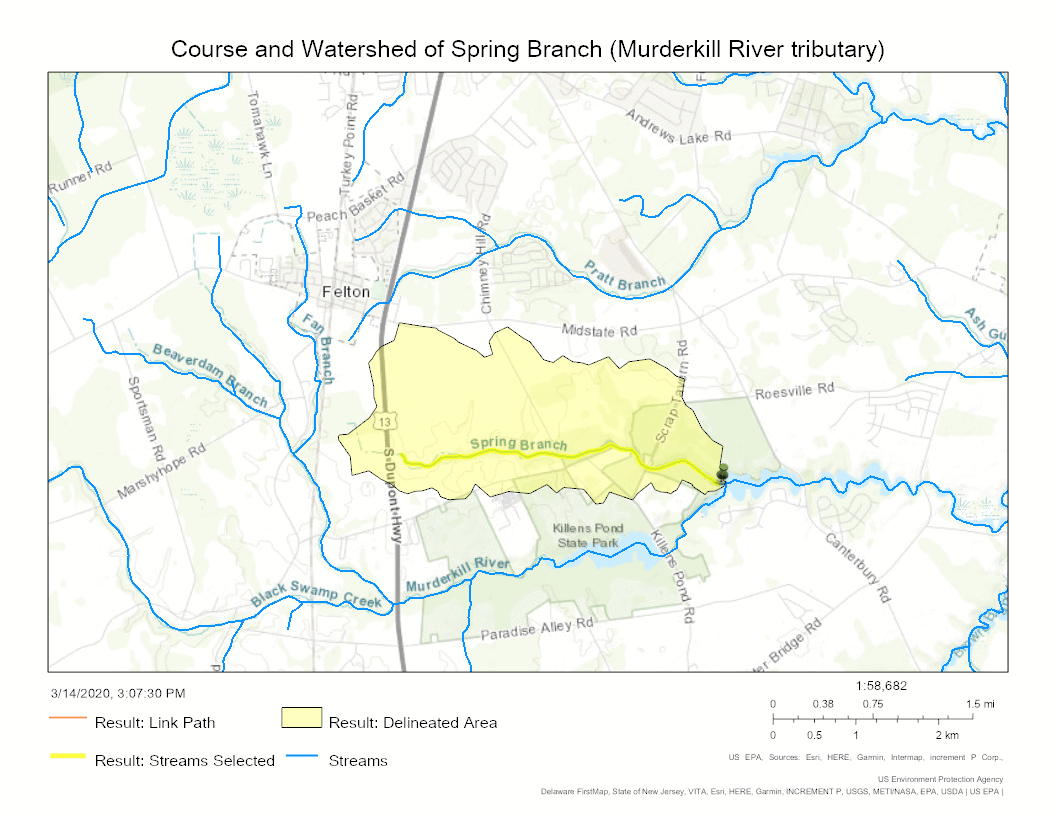
Course and Watershed of Spring Branch (Murderkill River tributary)
