= Chapel Branch (Lewes Creek tributary) =

Stream in Delaware, United States

Chapel Branch Tributary to Lewes Creek
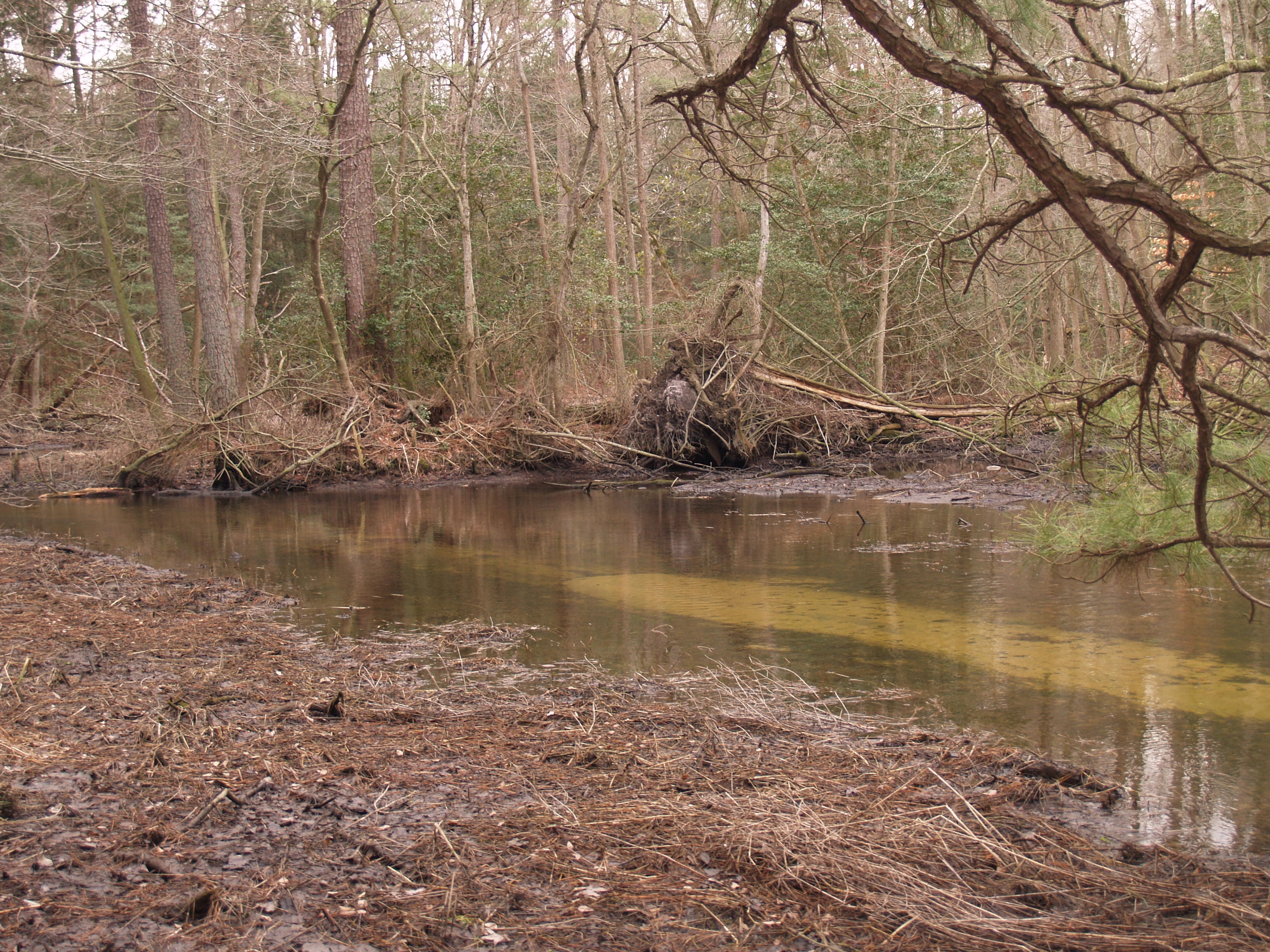
- Chapel Branch from Chapel Branch Nature Preserve

- Location of Chapel Branch mouth Chapel Branch (Lewes Creek tributary) (the United States)

Location
- Country: United States
- State: Delaware
- County: Sussex

Physical characteristics
- Source: divide between Chapel Branch and Tanyard Branch
  - location: about 1 mile south of Atlanta, Delaware
  - coordinates: 38°41′22″N 075°40′37″W
  - elevation: 45 ft (14 m)
- Mouth: Lewes Creek
  - location: Seaford, Delaware
  - coordinates: 38°37′13″N 075°38′16″W
  - elevation: 0 ft (0 m)
- Length: 6.4 mi (10.3 km)
- Basin size: 7.14 square miles (18.5 km^{2})
- Discharge
  - location: Lewes Creek
  - average: 8.45 cu ft/s (0.239 m^{3}/s) at mouth with Lewes Creek

Basin features
- Progression: southeast
- River system: Nanticoke River
- Tributaries
  - left: unnamed tributaries
  - right: unnamed tributaries

Chapel Branch is a 6.4 mi (10.3 km) long tributary to Lewes Creek in Sussex County, Delaware. Lewes Creek then flows into the Nanticoke River.

== See also ==
- List of Delaware rivers
