= Dorman Branch (Love Creek tributary) =

Watercourse in Delaware, US

Dorman Branch Tributary to Love Creek
- Location within Delaware Location within the United States

Location
- Country: United States
- State: Delaware
- County: Sussex

Physical characteristics
- Source: Hetty Fisher Glade divide
  - location: about 0.5 miles west of Old Landing Woods
  - coordinates: 38°42′30″N 075°09′07″W
  - elevation: 5 ft (1.5 m)
- Mouth: Love Creek
  - location: Robinson Landing, Delaware
  - coordinates: 38°41′38″N 075°08′39″W
  - elevation: 0 ft (0 m)
- Length: 1.26 mi (2.03 km)
- Basin size: 0.87 square miles (2.3 km^{2})
- Discharge
  - average: 1.06 cu ft/s (0.030 m^{3}/s) at mouth with Love Creek

Basin features
- Progression: southeast
- River system: Rehoboth Bay
- Tributaries
  - left: unnamed tributaries
  - right: unnamed tributaries

Dorman Branch is a 1.26 mi (2.03 km) long 1st order tributary to Love Creek in Sussex County, Delaware.

== Course ==
Dorman Branch rises on the Hetty Fisher Glade divide in Sussex County, Delaware. Dorman Branch then flows southeast to meet Love Creek at Robinson Landing.

== Watershed ==
Dorman Branch drains 0.87 square miles (2.3 km^{2}) of area, receives about 45.3 in/year of precipitation, has a topographic wetness index of 565.22 and is about 11.56% forested.

== See also ==
- List of rivers of Delaware
