= Kings Causeway Branch =

Stream in Delaware, USA

Kings Causeway Branch Tributary to Mispillion River
- Location of Kings Causeway Branch mouth Kings Causeway Branch (the United States)

Location
- Country: United States
- State: Delaware
- County: Kent

Physical characteristics
- Source: Brockonbridge Gut divide
  - location: about 0.5 miles west of Scotts Corners, Delaware
  - coordinates: 38°59′34″N 075°23′24″W
  - elevation: 7 ft (2.1 m)
- Mouth: Mispillion River
  - location: about 2.5 miles southeast of Herrings Corners, Delaware
  - coordinates: 38°57′39″N 075°22′40″W
  - elevation: 0 ft (0 m)
- Length: 2.43 mi (3.91 km)
- Basin size: 1.96 square miles (5.1 km^{2})
- Discharge
  - location: Mispillion River
  - average: 2.43 cu ft/s (0.069 m^{3}/s) at mouth with Mispillion River

Basin features
- Progression: Mispillion River → Delaware Bay → Atlantic Ocean
- River system: Mispillion River
- Tributaries
  - left: unnamed tributaries
  - right: unnamed tributaries
- Bridges: Big Stone Beach Road, Stratham Lane

Kings Causeway Branch is a 2.43 mi (3.91 km) long 1st order tributary to the Mispillion River in Kent County, Delaware. This is the only stream of this name in the United States.

== Course ==
Kings Causeway Branch rises on the Brockonbridge Gut divide about 0.5 miles west of Scotts Corners, Delaware. Kings Causeway Branch then flows south to meet the Mispillion River about 2.5 miles southeast of Herrings Corners, Delaware.

== Watershed ==
Kings Causeway Branch drains 1.96 square miles (5.1 km^{2}) of area, receives about 45.3 in/year of precipitation, has a topographic wetness index of 696.03 and is about 4.8% forested.

== See also ==
- List of Delaware rivers

== Maps ==
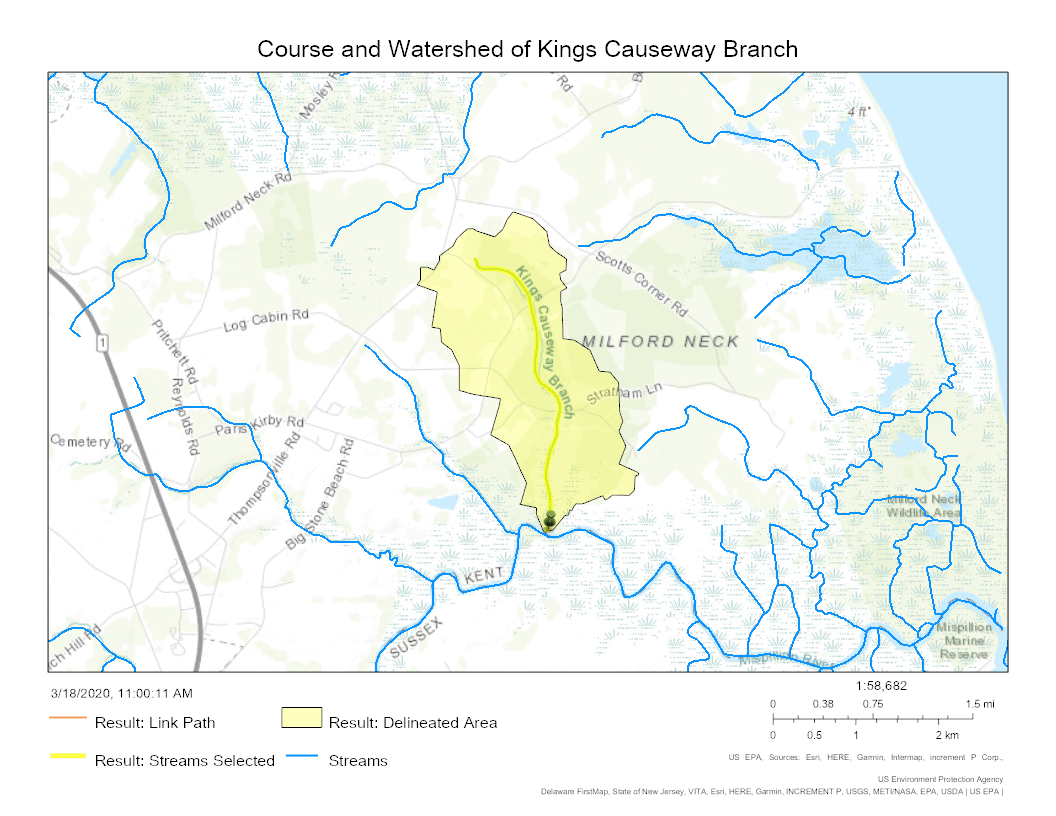
Course and Watershed of Kings Causeway Branch
