= Green Branch (Marshyhope Creek tributary) =

Stream in Delaware, USA

Green Branch Tributary to Marshyhope Creek
- Location of Green Branch mouth Green Branch (Marshyhope Creek tributary) (the United States)

Location
- Country: United States
- State: Delaware
- County: Kent

Physical characteristics
- Source: Webber Branch divide
  - location: Melvin Crossroads, Delaware
  - coordinates: 38°54′41.41″N 075°42′42.75″W
  - elevation: 60 ft (18 m)
- Mouth: Marshyhope Creek
  - location: about 1.5 miles northeast of Adamsville, Delaware
  - coordinates: 38°51′3.41″N 075°40′7.74″W
  - elevation: 36 ft (11 m)
- Length: 6.60 mi (10.62 km)
- Basin size: 6.49 square miles (16.8 km^{2})
- Discharge
  - location: Marshyhope Creek
  - average: 7.81 cu ft/s (0.221 m^{3}/s) at mouth with Marshyhope Creek

Basin features
- Progression: Marshyhope Creek → Nanticoke River → Chesapeake Bay → Atlantic Ocean
- River system: Nanticoke River
- Tributaries
  - left: unnamed tributaries
  - right: unnamed tributaries
- Bridges: Pear Tree Lane, Layton Corners Road, DE 14, Greenville Road, Gallo Road

Green Branch is a 6.60 mi (10.62 km) long second-order tributary to Marshyhope Creek in Kent County, Delaware.

== Course ==
Green Branch rises on the Webber Branch divide at Melvin Crossroads and then flows generally south to join Marshyhope Creek about 1.5 miles northeast of Adamsville, Delaware.

== Watershed ==
Green Branch drains 6.49 square miles (16.8 km^{2}) of area, receives about 44.8 in/year of precipitation, and is about 5.60% forested.

== See also ==
- List of rivers of Delaware
