= Willis Branch (Leipsic River tributary) =

Willis Branch Tributary to Leipsic River
- Location within Delaware Location within the United States

Location
- Country: United States
- State: Delaware
- County: Kent

Physical characteristics
- Source: Pond on the Fork Branch divide
  - location: about 0.5 miles east of Seven Hickories, Delaware
  - coordinates: 39°12′43″N 075°36′59″W
  - elevation: 52 ft (16 m)
- Mouth: Leipsic River (Garrisons Lake)
  - location: about 1.5 miles northwest of Bishops Corner, Delaware
  - coordinates: 39°14′38″N 075°35′43″W
  - elevation: 7 ft (2.1 m)
- Length: 3.23 mi (5.20 km)
- Basin size: 2.79 square miles (7.2 km^{2})
- Discharge
  - average: 3.42 cu ft/s (0.097 m^{3}/s) at mouth with Leipsic River

Basin features
- Progression: southeast
- River system: Leipsic River
- Tributaries
  - left: unnamed tributaries
  - right: unnamed tributaries
- Bridges: Lynnbury Woods Road, Moorton Road

Willis Branch is a 3.23 mi (5.20 km) long 2nd order tributary to the Leipsic River in Kent County, Delaware.

== Course ==
Willis Branch rises in a pond on the Fork Branch divide about 0.5 miles east of Seven Hickories, Delaware.

== Watershed ==
Willis Branch drains 2.79 square miles (7.2 km^{2}) of area, receives about 45.0 in/year of precipitation, has a topographic wetness index of 557.46 and is about 8.0% forested.

== See also ==
- List of rivers of Delaware
