= Silver Run (Delaware Bay tributary) =

Stream in Delaware, USA

Silver Run Tributary to Delaware Bay
- Location of Silver Run mouth Silver Run (Delaware Bay tributary) (the United States)

Location
- Country: United States
- State: Delaware
- County: New Castle

Physical characteristics
- Source: divide between Silver Run and Drawyers Creek
  - location: McDonough, Delaware
  - coordinates: 39°29′35″N 075°38′55″W
  - elevation: 20 ft (6.1 m)
- Mouth: Delaware Bay
  - location: Bay View Beach, Delaware
  - coordinates: 39°28′43″N 075°35′32″W
  - elevation: 0 ft (0 m)
- Length: 3.03 mi (4.88 km)
- Basin size: 3.13 square miles (8.1 km^{2})
- Discharge
  - location: Delaware Bay
  - average: 3.55 cu ft/s (0.101 m^{3}/s) at mouth with Delaware Bay

Basin features
- Progression: southeast
- River system: Delaware Bay
- Tributaries
  - left: unnamed tributaries
  - right: unnamed tributaries

Silver Run is a 3.03 mi (4.88 km) long tributary to Delaware Bay in New Castle County, Delaware. Silver Run is tidal for most of its course and drains a large part of Augustine Wildlife Area.

== See also ==
- List of Delaware rivers
