= Iron Mine Branch (Marshyhope Creek tributary) =

Stream in Delaware, USA

Iron Mine Branch Tributary to Marshyhope Creek
- Location of Iron Mine Branch mouth Iron Mine Branch (Marshyhope Creek tributary) (the United States)

Location
- Country: United States
- State: Delaware
- County: Sussex

Physical characteristics
- Source: Bridgeville Branch divide
  - location: Dublin Hill, Delaware
  - coordinates: 38°46′12.00″N 075°38′33.00″W
  - elevation: 58 ft (18 m)
- Mouth: Marshyhope Creek
  - location: about 1-mile south-southwest of Woodenhawk, Delaware
  - coordinates: 38°46′57.41″N 075°42′10.75″W
  - elevation: 23 ft (7.0 m)
- Length: 3.96 mi (6.37 km)
- Basin size: 2.82 square miles (7.3 km^{2})
- Discharge
  - location: Marshyhope Creek
  - average: 3.40 cu ft/s (0.096 m^{3}/s) at mouth with Marshyhope Creek

Basin features
- Progression: Marshyhope Creek → Nanticoke River → Chesapeake Bay → Atlantic Ocean
- River system: Nanticoke River
- Tributaries
  - left: unnamed tributaries
  - right: unnamed tributaries
- Bridges: Epworth Church Road, PA 404, Smith Road, Sand Hill Road

Iron Mine Branch is a 3.82 mi (6.15 km) long second-order tributary to Marshyhope Creek in Sussex County, Delaware.

== Course ==
Iron Mine Branch rises on the Bridgeville Branch divide at Dublin Hill, Delaware, and then flows generally northwest to join Marshyhope Creek about 1.5 miles south-southwest of Woodenhawk, Delaware.

== Watershed ==
Iron Mine Branch drains 2.82 square miles (7.3 km^{2}) of area, receives about 44.8 in/year of precipitation, and is about 3.04% forested.

== See also ==
- List of rivers of Delaware
