= Cow Bridge Branch =

Stream in Delaware, U.S.

Cow Bridge Branch Tributary to Indian River
- Location of Cow Bridge Branch mouth Cow Bridge Branch (the United States)

Location
- Country: United States
- State: Delaware
- County: Sussex

Physical characteristics
- Source: Outlet of Morris Millpond
  - location: Morris Mill, Delaware
  - coordinates: 38°38′22.41″N 075°18′57.69″W
  - elevation: 12 ft (3.7 m)
- Mouth: Millsboro Pond
  - location: Millsboro, Delaware
  - coordinates: 38°36′21.41″N 075°17′53.69″W
  - elevation: 3 ft (0.91 m)
- Length: 3.98 mi (6.41 km)
- Basin size: 31.58 square miles (81.8 km^{2})
- Discharge
  - location: Millsboro Pond
  - average: 42.07 cu ft/s (1.191 m^{3}/s) at mouth into Millsboro Pond

Basin features
- Progression: Millsboro Pond → Indian River → Indian River Bay → Atlantic Ocean
- River system: Indian River
- Tributaries
  - left: Deep Branch
  - right: Gills Branch; Stockley Branch; Mirey Branch
- Bridges: Zoar Road

Cow Bridge Branch is a 3.98 mi (6.41 km) long third-order tributary to Millsboro Pond in Sussex County, Delaware. This is the only stream of this name in the United States.

== Variant names ==
According to the Geographic Names Information System, it has also been known historically as:

- Cow Bridge Brook
- Doe Bridge Branch

== Course ==
Cow Bridge Branch begins at the outlet of Morris Millpond at Morris Mill, Delaware, where Deep Branch and Gills Branch join. Cow Bridge Branch then flows south-southeast to Millsboro Pond.

== Watershed ==
Cow Bridge Branch drains 31.58 square miles (81.8 km^{2}) of area, receives about 45.1 in/year of precipitation, and is about 23.07% forested.

== See also ==
- List of rivers of Delaware
