= Wright Creek (Nanticoke River tributary) =

Stream in Delaware, USA

Wright Creek Tributary to Nanticoke River
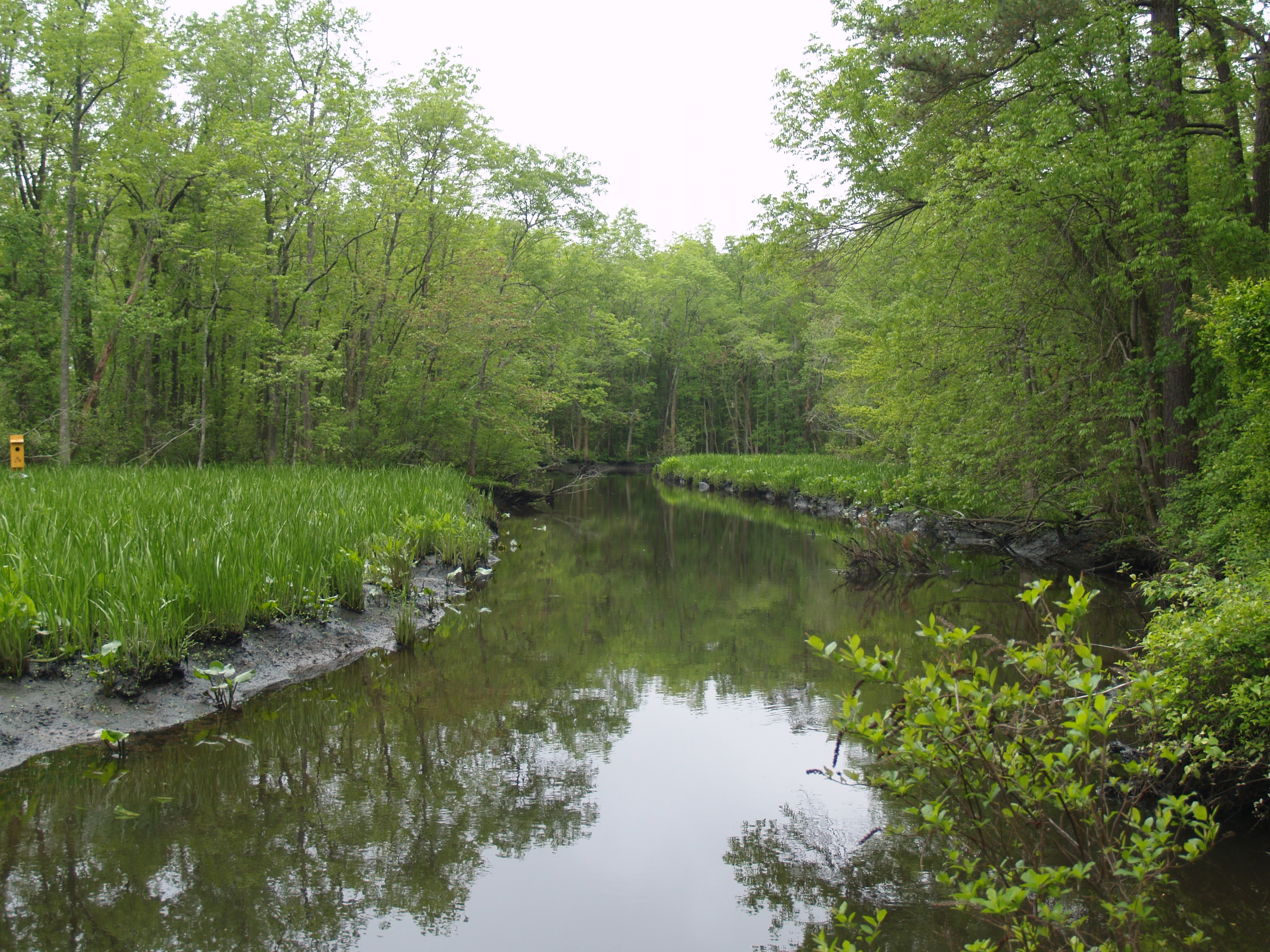
- Wright Creek from Nanticoke Wildlife Area

- Location of Wright Creek mouth Wright Creek (Nanticoke River tributary) (the United States)

Location
- Country: United States
- State: Maryland; Delaware
- Counties: Sussex; Dorchester

Physical characteristics
- Source: divide between Wright Creek and Turtle Branch
  - location: about 3 miles west of Woodland, Delaware
  - coordinates: 38°33′42″N 075°42′04″W
  - elevation: 34 ft (10 m)
- Mouth: Nanticoke River
  - location: about 1 mile east of Galestown, Maryland
  - coordinates: 38°36′43″N 075°41′35″W
  - elevation: 0 ft (0 m)
- Length: 4.07 mi (6.55 km)
- Basin size: 5.25 square miles (13.6 km^{2})
- Discharge
  - location: Nanticoke River
  - average: 6.04 cu ft/s (0.171 m^{3}/s) at mouth with Nanticoke River

Basin features
- Progression: Nanticoke River → Chesapeake Bay → Atlantic Ocean
- River system: Nanticoke River
- Tributaries
  - left: unnamed tributaries
  - right: unnamed tributaries

Wright Creek is a 5.25 mi (8.45 km) long tributary to the Nanticoke River that rises in western Sussex County, Delaware. The creek straddles the Delaware state line for most of its course and is tidal for about half of its length.

== See also ==
- List of Delaware rivers
- List of rivers of Maryland
