= Cherry Walk Creek (Love Creek tributary) =

Cherry Walk Creek Tributary to Love Creek
- Location within Delaware Location within the United States

Location
- Country: United States
- State: Delaware
- County: Sussex

Physical characteristics
- Source: Sarah Run divide
  - location: pond at Camp Arrowhead Road
  - coordinates: 38°40′56″N 075°09′54″W
  - elevation: 5 ft (1.5 m)
- Mouth: Love Creek
  - location: about 0.5 miles north of Joy Beach, Delaware
  - coordinates: 38°41′16″N 075°08′41″W
  - elevation: 0 ft (0 m)
- Length: 1.45 mi (2.33 km)
- Basin size: 1.05 square miles (2.7 km^{2})
- Discharge
  - average: 1.25 cu ft/s (0.035 m^{3}/s) at mouth with Love Creek

Basin features
- Progression: southeast then northeast
- River system: Rehoboth Bay
- Tributaries
  - left: unnamed tributaries
  - right: unnamed tributaries
- Bridges: Camp Arrowhead Road; Waterview Road

Cherry Walk Creek is a 1.45 mi (2.33 km) long first order tributary to Love Creek in Sussex County, Delaware.

== Course ==
Cherry Walk Creek rises on the Sarah Run divide in Sussex County, Delaware. Cherry Walk Creek then flows southeast and northeast to meet Love Creek about 0.5 miles north of Joy Beach.

== Watershed ==
Cherry Walk Creek drains 1.05 square miles (2.7 km^{2}) of area, receives about 45.3 inches (1,150 mm) per year of precipitation, has a topographic wetness index of 569.18 and is about 40.4% forested.

== See also ==
- List of rivers of Delaware
