= Taylor Branch (Leipsic River tributary) =

Watercourse in Kent County, Delaware, United States

Taylor Branch Tributary to Leipsic River
- Location within Delaware Location within the United States

Location
- Country: United States
- State: Delaware
- County: Kent

Physical characteristics
- Source: Fork Branch divide
  - location: Shaws Corner, Delaware
  - coordinates: 39°12′20″N 075°38′56″W
  - elevation: 64 ft (20 m)
- Mouth: Leipsic River
  - location: about 1 mile east of Kenton, Delaware
  - coordinates: 39°13′54″N 075°38′11″W
  - elevation: 23 ft (7.0 m)
- Length: 2.14 mi (3.44 km)
- Basin size: 1.75 square miles (4.5 km^{2})
- Discharge
  - average: 2.14 cu ft/s (0.061 m^{3}/s) at mouth with Leipsic Riverh

Basin features
- Progression: north
- River system: Leipsic River
- Tributaries
  - left: unnamed tributaries
  - right: unnamed tributaries
- Bridges: DE 42

Taylor Branch is a 2.14 mi (3.44 km) long 2nd order tributary to the Leipsic River in Kent County, Delaware.

== Course ==
Taylor Branch rises on the Fork Branch divide at Shaws Corner, Delaware.

== Watershed ==
Taylor Branch drains 1.75 square miles (4.5 km^{2}) of area, receives about 44.9 in/year of precipitation, has a topographic wetness index of 622.47 and is about 4.8% forested.

== See also ==
- List of rivers of Delaware
