= Simons River =

- Location within Delaware Location within the United States

Location
- Country: United States
- State: Delaware
- County: Kent

Physical characteristics
- Source
  - coordinates: 39°12′46″N 075°25′48″W
- Mouth
  - location: 4.7 miles northeast of Little Creek, Delaware
  - coordinates: 39°13′23″N 075°24′15″W
  - elevation: sea level (0 ft.)
- Length: 1.8 miles

Basin features
- River system: Delaware River

The Simons River is a short river in Delaware in the United States, approximately 3 mi (5 km) long. It drains a wetlands area on the southern shore of Delaware Bay.

It is formed in Bombay Hook National Wildlife Refuge approximately 5 mi (8 km) northwest of Dover, Delaware, by the confluence of Herring Branch and Green Creek. It flows in a serpentine course to the Delaware. The river is flanked on the north by the mouth of the Leipsic River.

== See also ==
- List of rivers of Delaware
