= Army Creek =

River in Maryland, United States

Army Creek Armstrong Creek Mill Creek
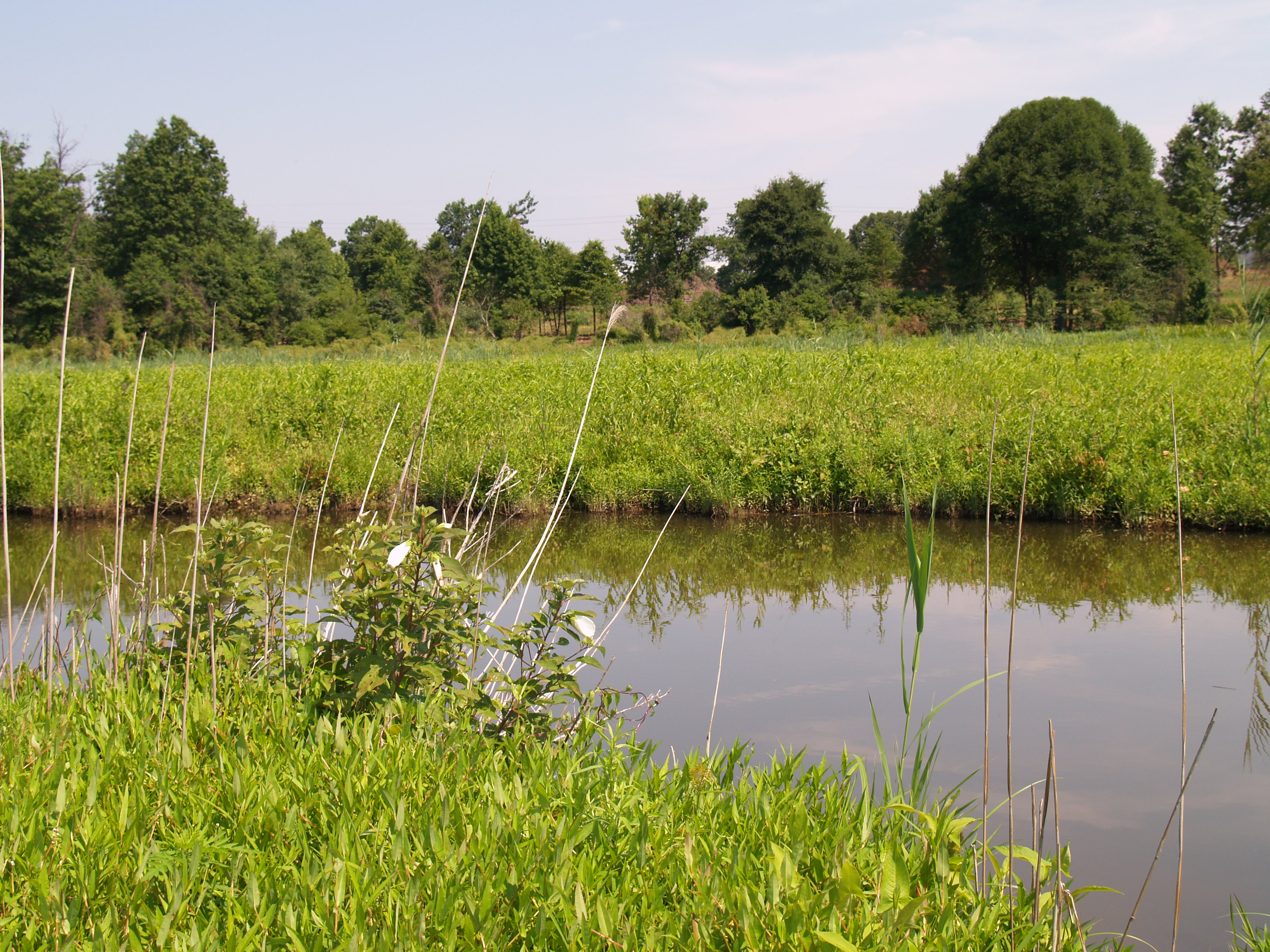
- Army Creek in 2007

- Location within Delaware Location within the United States

Location
- Country: United States
- State: Delaware
- County: New Castle

Physical characteristics
- Source: watershed divide between Army Creek and Christina River
  - location: near Buena Vista State Conference Center
  - coordinates: 39°38′04″N 075°38′34″W
  - elevation: about 60 feet
- Mouth
  - location: 1 mile SW of New Castle, Delaware
  - coordinates: 39°39′05″N 075°35′14″W
  - elevation: sea level (0 ft.)
- Length: 4 miles (6.4 km)

Basin features
- Progression: East-Northeast
- River system: Delaware River
- Tributaries
  - left: several unnamed tributaries
  - right: several unnamed tributaries
- Waterbodies: one unnamed impoundment
- Bridges: US 13; DE 9

Army Creek is a 4-mile (6.4 km) long river in northern Delaware in the United States that drains about 10 square miles (26 km^{2}). The stream is controlled by a floodgate just downstream of DE 9 that does not allow tidal influence of the stream.

The source of Army Creek is near the eastern edge of Bear, Delaware in the south and New Castle County Airport in the north. The water then flows ENE to the Delaware River about 1 mile (1.6 km) SW of New Castle, Delaware, at Dobbinsville. Most of the watershed is urban/residential.

The watershed is the scene of two Superfund sites owing to the urban/industrial history.

== See also ==
- List of Delaware rivers
