= Wilson Creek (Herring Creek tributary) =

Wilson Creek Tributary to Herring Creek
- Location within Delaware Location within the United States

Location
- Country: United States
- State: Delaware
- County: Sussex

Physical characteristics
- Source: Lingo Creek divide
  - location: about 0.1 miles southwest of Rehoboth Shores
  - coordinates: 38°37′48″N 075°08′54″W
  - elevation: 03 ft (0.91 m)
- Mouth: Herring Creek
  - location: about 0.25 miles north of Rehoboth Shores
  - coordinates: 38°38′21″N 075°08′54″W
  - elevation: 0 ft (0 m)
- Length: 1.06 mi (1.71 km)
- Basin size: 0.92 square miles (2.4 km^{2})
- Discharge
  - average: 1.09 cu ft/s (0.031 m^{3}/s) at mouth with Herring Creek

Basin features
- Progression: northeast
- River system: Rehoboth Bay
- Tributaries
  - left: unnamed tributaries
  - right: unnamed tributaries
- Bridges: none

Wilson Creek is a 1.06 mi (1.71 km) long 1st order tributary to Herring Creek in Sussex County, Delaware.

== Course ==
Wilson Creek rises on the Lingo Creek divide, about 0.1 miles southeast of Rehoboth Shores in Sussex County, Delaware. Wilson Creek then flows northeast to meet Herring Creek about 0.25 miles north of Rehoboth Shores.

== Watershed ==
Wilson Creek drains 0.92 square miles (2.4 km^{2}) of area, receives about 44.9 in/year of precipitation, has a topographic wetness index of 588.33 and is about 16.3% forested.

== See also ==
- List of rivers of Delaware
