= Brockonbridge Gut =

Stream in Delaware, USA

Brockonbridge Gut Tributary to Delaware Bay
- Location of Brockonbridge Gut mouth Brockonbridge Gut (the United States)

Location
- Country: United States
- State: Delaware
- County: Kent

Physical characteristics
- Source: Murderkill River divide
  - location: Thompsonville, Delaware
  - coordinates: 38°59′47″N 075°23′54″W
  - elevation: 9 ft (2.7 m)
- Mouth: Delaware Bay
  - location: Sandy Point, Delaware
  - coordinates: 39°02′20″N 075°22′25″W
  - elevation: 0 ft (0 m)
- Length: 4.67 mi (7.52 km)
- Basin size: 4.55 square miles (11.8 km^{2})
- Discharge
  - location: Delaware Bay
  - average: 5.54 cu ft/s (0.157 m^{3}/s) at mouth with Delaware Bay

Basin features
- Progression: northeast
- River system: Delaware Bay
- Tributaries
  - left: unnamed tributaries
  - right: unnamed tributaries
- Bridges: Milford Neck Road, Thompsonville Road, Brockam Bridge Road

Brockonbridge Gut is a 4.67 mi (7.52 km) long 2nd order tributary to Delaware Bay in Kent County, Delaware. Brockonbridge Gut is the only stream of this name in the United States.

== Variant names ==
According to the Geographic Names Information System, it has also been known historically as:

- Baucumbrig Creek

== Course ==
Brockonbridge Gut rises on the Murderkill River divide at Thompsonville, Delaware. Brockonbridge Gut then flows northeast to meet Delaware Bay at Sandy Point.

== Watershed ==
Brockonbridge Gut drains 4.55 square miles (11.8 km^{2}) of area, receives about 45.0 in/year of precipitation, has a topographic wetness index of 788.71 and is about 3.0% forested.

== See also ==
- List of Delaware rivers

== Maps ==
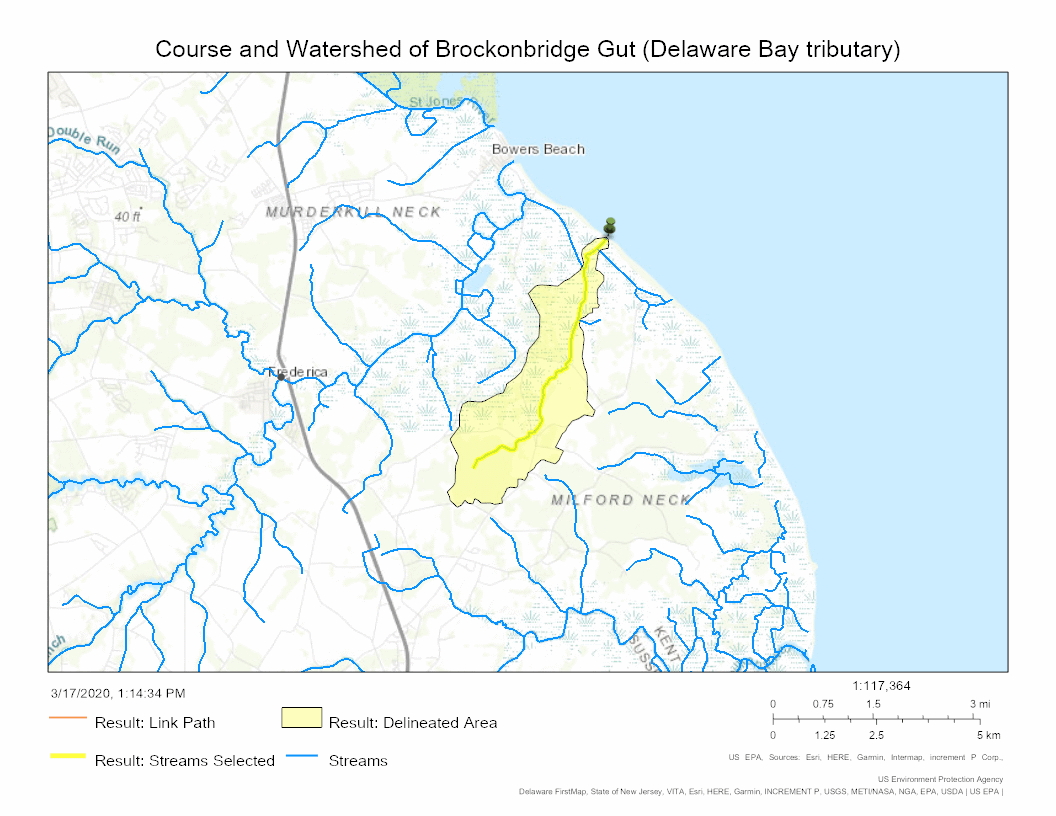
Course and Watershed of Brockonbridge Gut
