= Hangmans Run (Appoquinimink River tributary) =

Hangmans Run Tributary to Appoquinimink River
- Location within Delaware Location within the United States

Location
- Country: United States
- State: Delaware
- County: New Castle

Physical characteristics
- Source: Beaver Branch divide
  - location: about 0.25 miles northeast of Fieldsboro, Delaware
  - coordinates: 39°25′17″N 075°39′07″W
  - elevation: 31 ft (9.4 m)
- Mouth: Appoquinimink River
  - location: about 0.5 miles southeast of Thomas Landing, Delaware
  - coordinates: 39°26′49″N 075°36′07″W
  - elevation: 0 ft (0 m)
- Length: 3.64 mi (5.86 km)
- Basin size: 45.21 square miles (117.1 km^{2})
- Discharge
  - average: 4.70 cu ft/s (0.133 m^{3}/s) at mouth with Appoquinmink River

Basin features
- Progression: northeast
- River system: Appoquinimink River
- Tributaries
  - left: unnamed tributaries
  - right: unnamed tributaries
- Bridges: Taylors Bridge Road

Hangmans Run is a 3.64 mi (5.86 km) long 1st order tributary to Appoquinimink River in New Castle County, Delaware.

== Variant names ==
According to the Geographic Names Information System, it has also been known historically as:

- Damascus Creek

== Course ==
Hangmans Run rises on the Beaver Branch divide about 0.25 miles northeast of Fieldsboro in New Castle County, Delaware. Hangmans Run then flows northeast to meet the Appoquinimink River about 0.5 miles southeast of Thomas Landing, Delaware.

== Watershed ==
Hangmans Run drains 45.21 square miles (117.1 km^{2}) of area, receives about 43.2 in/year of precipitation, has a topographic wetness index of 612.35 and is about 5.5% forested.

== See also ==
- List of rivers of Delaware
