= Round Pole Branch =

Stream in Delaware, USA

Round Pole Branch Tributary to Broadkill River
- Location of Round Pole Branch mouth Round Pole Branch (the United States)

Location
- Country: United States
- State: Delaware
- County: Sussex

Physical characteristics
- Source: Sockorockets Ditch divide
  - location: Gravel Hill, Delaware
  - coordinates: 38°42′56.41″N 075°19′25.69″W
  - elevation: 40 ft (12 m)
- Mouth: Broadkill River
  - location: Milton, Delaware
  - coordinates: 38°46′34.40″N 075°18′11.69″W
  - elevation: 0 ft (0 m)
- Length: 5.24 mi (8.43 km)
- Basin size: 7.14 square miles (18.5 km^{2})
- Discharge
  - location: Broadkill River
  - average: 8.52 cu ft/s (0.241 m^{3}/s) at mouth with Broadkill River

Basin features
- Progression: Broadkill River → Delaware Bay → Atlantic Ocean
- River system: Broadkill River
- Tributaries
  - left: unnamed tributaries
  - right: unnamed tributaries
- Bridges: Harbeson Road, Cave Neck Road

Round Pole Branch is a 5.24 mi (8.43 km) long first-order tributary to the Broadkill River in Sussex County, Delaware. This is the only stream of this name in the United States.

== Course ==
Round Pole Branch rises on the Sockorockets Ditch divide at Gravel Hill, Delaware and then flows generally north-northeast to join the Broadkill River at Milton, Delaware.

== Watershed ==
Round Pole Branch drains 7.14 square miles (18.5 km^{2}) of area, receives about 45.1 in/year of precipitation, and is about 24.30% forested.

== See also ==
- List of rivers of Delaware
