= East Branch Christina River =

East Branch Christina River Tributary to Christina River
- Location within Delaware Location within the United States

Location
- Country: United States
- State: Delaware; Maryland; Pennsylvania
- County: New Castle (DE); Cecil (MD); Chester (PA)

Physical characteristics
- Source: Christina River divide
  - location: about 0.25 miles northwest of Strickersville, Pennsylvania
  - coordinates: 39°44′18″N 075°48′20″W
  - elevation: 375 ft (114 m)
- Mouth: Christina River
  - location: Covered Bridge Farms, Delaware
  - coordinates: 39°42′02″N 075°47′09″W
  - elevation: 161 ft (49 m)
- Length: 2.96 mi (4.76 km)
- Basin size: 2.03 square miles (5.3 km^{2})
- Discharge
  - location: Christina River
  - average: 2.89 cu ft/s (0.082 m^{3}/s) at mouth with Christina River

Basin features
- Progression: Christina River → Delaware River → Delaware Bay → Atlantic Ocean
- River system: Christina River
- Tributaries
  - left: unnamed tributaries
  - right: unnamed tributaries
- Bridges: Strickersville Road, Elbow Lane, Little Egypt Road, Harvest Lane, Wedgewood Road, Covered Bridge Lane

East Branch Christina River is a 2.96-mile-long (4.76 km) first-order tributary to the Christina River in New Castle County, Delaware in the United States.

== Course ==
East Branch Christina River rises on the Christina River divide in Chester County, Pennsylvania and flows south into Cecil County, Maryland then southeast into New Castle County, Delaware meet the Christina River at Covered Bridge Farms.

== Watershed ==
East Branch Christina River drains 2.03 square miles (5.3 km^{2}) of area, receives about 46.3 in/year of precipitation, has a topographic wetness index of 409.33 and is about 36.7% forested.

== See also ==
- List of Delaware rivers

== Maps ==
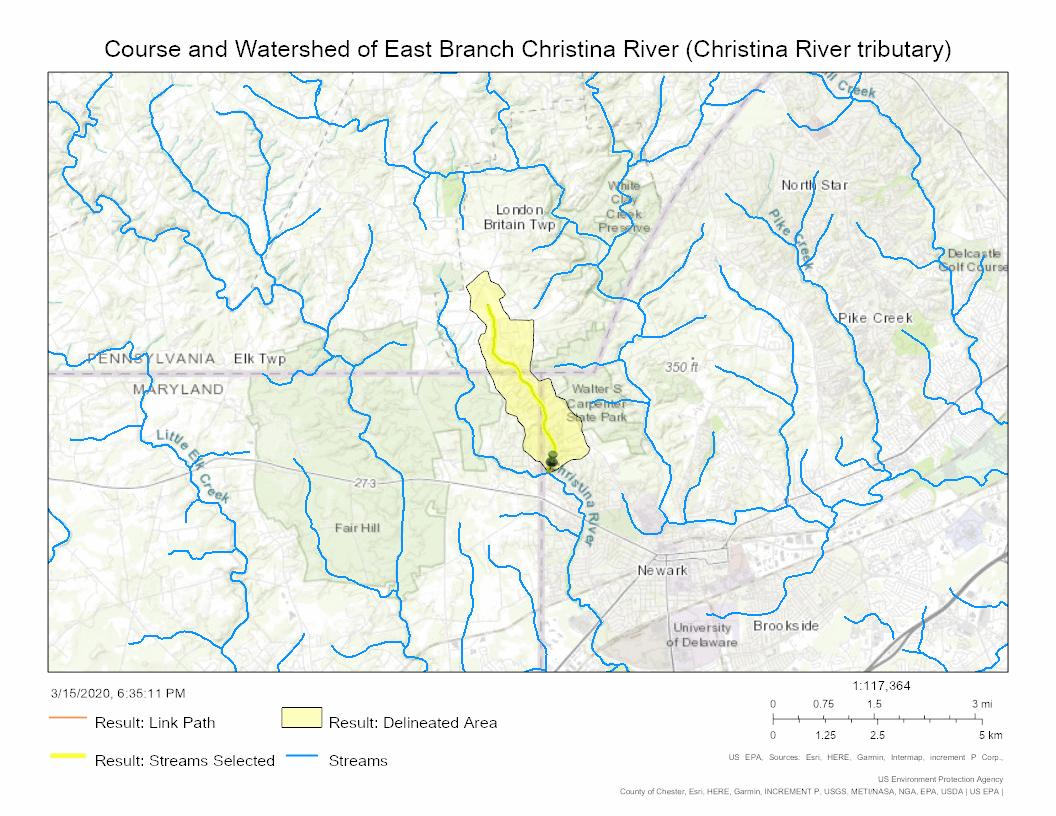
Course and watershed of East Branch Christina River
