= Perch Creek (Elk River tributary) =

Located in Elk River in Cecil County, Maryland

Perch Creek Tributary to Elk River
- Location within Maryland Location within the United States

Location
- Country: United States
- State: Maryland; Delaware
- County: Cecil (MD); New Castle (DE)

Physical characteristics
- Source: Belltown Run divide
  - location: about 0.5 miles southwest of Melody Meadows, Delaware
  - coordinates: 39°35′28″N 075°45′35″W
  - elevation: 70 ft (21 m)
- Mouth: Elk River
  - location: Old Frenchtown Wharf, Maryland
  - coordinates: 39°34′00″N 075°49′41″W
  - elevation: 0 ft (0 m)
- Length: 5.66 mi (9.11 km)
- Basin size: 9.84 square miles (25.5 km^{2})
- Discharge
  - average: 12.91 cu ft/s (0.366 m^{3}/s) at mouth with Elk River

Basin features
- Progression: Elk River → Chesapeake Bay → Atlantic Ocean
- River system: Elk River
- Tributaries
  - left: unnamed tributaries
  - right: unnamed tributaries
- Bridges: Frazer Road, Hutton Road, Augustine Herman Highway

Perch Creek is a 5.66 mi (9.11 km) long 2nd order tributary to the Elk River in Cecil County, Maryland.

== Variant names ==
According to the Geographic Names Information System, it has also been known historically as:

- Perch Creek Run
- Thomas Branch

== Course ==
Perch Creek rises on the Belltown Run divide at Melody Meadows in New Castle County, Delaware. Perch Creek then flows southwest into Maryland to meet the Elk River at Old Frenchtown Wharf, Maryland.

== Watershed ==
Perch Creek drains 9.84 square miles (25.5 km^{2}) of area, receives about 46.0 in/year of precipitation, has a topographic wetness index of 512.53 and is about 25.9% forested.

== See also ==
- List of rivers of Delaware
