= Hurricane Run (Rocky Run tributary) =

Stream in Delaware, USA

Hurricane Run Tributary to Rocky Run
- Location of Hurricane Run mouth Hurricane Run (Rocky Run tributary) (the United States)

Location
- Country: United States
- State: Delaware
- County: New Castle

Physical characteristics
- Source: Beaver Creek divide
  - location: about 0.25 miles west of Devonshire, Delaware
  - coordinates: 39°49′40″N 075°32′50″W
  - elevation: 372 ft (113 m)
- Mouth: Rocky Run
  - location: about 0.5 miles north of Tavistock, Delaware
  - coordinates: 39°49′00″N 075°33′33″W
  - elevation: 226 ft (69 m)
- Discharge
  - location: Rocky Run

Basin features
- Progression: southwest
- River system: Delaware River
- Tributaries
  - left: unnamed tributaries
  - right: unnamed tributaries
- Bridges: Woodlawn Road

Hurricane Run is a 1st order tributary to Rocky Run in New Castle County, Delaware.

== Course ==
Hurricane Run rises about 0.25 miles west of Devonshire, Delaware, and then flows southwest to join Rocky Run about 0.5 miles north of Tavistock, Delaware.

== See also ==
- List of Delaware rivers
