= Cod Creek (Nanticoke River tributary) =

Stream in Delaware, US

Cod Creek Tributary to Nanticoke River
- Location of Cod Creek mouth Cod Creek (Nanticoke River tributary) (the United States)

Location
- Country: United States
- State: Delaware
- County: Sussex

Physical characteristics
- Source: Mill Branch divide
  - location: about 1 mile northeast of Columbia, Delaware
  - coordinates: 38°30′01″N 075°39′07″W
  - elevation: 45 ft (14 m)
- Mouth: Nanticoke River
  - location: about 0.75 miles northeast of Sharptown, Maryland
  - coordinates: 38°33′22″N 075°41′39″W
  - elevation: 0 ft (0 m)
- Length: 5.51 mi (8.87 km)
- Basin size: 6.04 square miles (15.6 km^{2})
- Discharge
  - location: Nanticoke River
  - average: 6.85 cu ft/s (0.194 m^{3}/s) at mouth with Nanticoke River

Basin features
- Progression: Nanticoke River → Chesapeake Bay → Atlantic Ocean
- River system: Nanticoke River
- Tributaries
  - left: Owens Branch
  - right: Kinniken Evans Ditch
- Bridges: John Cooper Road, DE 24, Shockley Road, Old Sharptown Road

Cod Creek is a 5.51 mi (8.87 km) long 2nd tributary to the Nanticoke River in Sussex County, Delaware.

== Course ==
Cod Creek rises about 1 mile northeast of Columbia, Delaware and then flows northwest into the Nanticoke River about 0.75 miles northeast of Sharptown, Maryland.

== Watershed ==
Cod Creek drains 6.04 square miles (15.6 km^{2}) of area, receives about 44.4 in/year of precipitation, has a topographic wetness index of 654.93 and is about 11% forested.

== See also ==
- List of Delaware rivers
