= Quarter Branch (Marshyhope Creek tributary) =

Stream in Delaware, USA

Quarter Branch Tributary to Marshyhope Creek
- Location of Quarter Branch mouth Quarter Branch (Marshyhope Creek tributary) (the United States)

Location
- Country: United States
- State: Delaware
- County: Sussex; Kent

Physical characteristics
- Source: Cart Branch divide
  - location: about 1.5 northwest of Greenwood, Delaware
  - coordinates: 38°50′21.41″N 075°37′20.74″W
  - elevation: 60 ft (18 m)
- Mouth: Marshyhope Creek
  - location: Adamsville, Delaware
  - coordinates: 38°49′58.41″N 075°41′7.25″W
  - elevation: 30 ft (9.1 m)
- Length: 4.47 mi (7.19 km)
- Basin size: 4.72 square miles (12.2 km^{2})
- Discharge
  - location: Marshyhope Creek
  - average: 5.81 cu ft/s (0.165 m^{3}/s) at mouth with Marshyhope Creek

Basin features
- Progression: Marshyhope Creek → Nanticoke River → Chesapeake Bay → Atlantic Ocean
- River system: Nanticoke River
- Tributaries
  - left: unnamed tributaries
  - right: unnamed tributaries
- Bridges: Nine Foot Road (x2), Todds Chapel Road

Quarter Branch is a 4.49 mi (7.23 km) long second-order tributary to Marshyhope Creek in Kent and Sussex Counties Delaware.

== Course ==
Quarter Branch rises on the Cart Branch divide about 1.5 miles northwest of Greenwood, Delaware, and then flows generally northwest to join Marshyhope Creek at Adamsville, Delaware.

== Watershed ==
Quarter Branch drains 4.72 square miles (12.2 km^{2}) of area, receives about 45.0 in/year of precipitation, and is about 4.38% forested.

== See also ==
- List of rivers of Delaware
