= Guinea Creek (Herring Creek tributary) =

Guinea Creek Tributary to Herring Creek
- Location within Delaware Location within the United States

Location
- Country: United States
- State: Delaware
- County: Sussex

Physical characteristics
- Source: Emily Gut divide
  - location: about 0.1 miles southeast of Holiday Pines
  - coordinates: 38°37′49″N 075°12′18″W
  - elevation: 20 ft (6.1 m)
- Mouth: Herring Creek
  - location: about 0.5 miles southwest of Angola Landing
  - coordinates: 38°38′36″N 075°08′50″W
  - elevation: 0 ft (0 m)
- Length: 4.22 mi (6.79 km)
- Basin size: 7.25 square miles (18.8 km^{2})
- Discharge
  - average: 8.55 cu ft/s (0.242 m^{3}/s) at mouth with Herring Creek

Basin features
- Progression: generally east
- River system: Rehoboth Bay
- Tributaries
  - left: unnamed tributaries
  - right: unnamed tributaries
- Bridges: Autumn Road; Indian Mission Road; DE 24; Banks Road

Guinea Creek is a 4.22 mi (6.79 km) long 1st order tributary to Herring Creek in Sussex County, Delaware, United States.

== Variant names ==
According to the Geographic Names Information System, it has also been known historically as:

- Goldsmith Branch

== Course ==
Guinea Creek rises on the Emily Gut divide, about 0.1 miles southeast of Holiday Pines in Sussex County, Delaware. Guinea Creek then flows generally east to meet Herring Creek about 0.5 miles southwest of Angola Landing.

== Watershed ==
Guinea Creek drains 7.25 square miles (18.8 km^{2}) of area, receives about 44.9 in/year of precipitation, has a topographic wetness index of 635.57 and is about 24.6% forested.

== See also ==
- List of rivers of Delaware
