= Beaver Creek (Brandywine Creek tributary) =

Stream in Delaware, USA

Beaver Creek Tributary to Brandywine Creek
- Location of Beaver Creek mouth Beaver Creek (Brandywine Creek tributary) (the United States)

Location
- Country: United States
- State: Delaware
- County: New Castle

Physical characteristics
- Source: Harvey Run and Webb Creek divide
  - location: about 0.5 miles north-northwest of Elam, Pennsylvania
  - coordinates: 39°51′40″N 075°32′41″W
  - elevation: 342 ft (104 m)
- Mouth: Brandywine Creek
  - location: about 0.5 miles east of Granoque, Delaware
  - coordinates: 39°50′04″N 075°34′36″W
  - elevation: 141 ft (43 m)
- Length: 2.62 mi (4.22 km)
- Basin size: 4.08 square miles (10.6 km^{2})
- Discharge
  - location: Brandywine Creek
  - average: 6.43 cu ft/s (0.182 m^{3}/s) at mouth with Brandywine Creek

Basin features
- Progression: southwest
- River system: Delaware River
- Tributaries
  - left: unnamed tributaries
  - right: unnamed tributaries
- Bridges: Heyburn Road, Smith Bridge Road, Creek Road

Beaver Creek is a 2.62 mi (4.22 km) long 2nd order tributary to Brandywine Creek in New Castle County, Delaware.

== Course ==
Beaver Creek rises about 0.5 miles north-northwest of Elam, Pennsylvania in Delaware County and then flows southwest to join Brandywine Creek about 0.5 miles east of Granoque, Delaware in New Castle County.

== Watershed ==
Beaver Creek drains 4.08 square miles (10.6 km^{2}) of area, receives about 48.0 in/year of precipitation, has a topographic wetness index of 410.33 and is about 43% forested.

== See also ==
- List of Delaware rivers
