= Agricultural Ditch (Dirickson Creek tributary) =

Agricultural Ditch Tributary to Dirickson Creek
- Location within Delaware Location within the United States

Location
- Country: United States
- State: Delaware
- County: Sussex

Physical characteristics
- Source: McCray Branch divide
  - location: about 0.25 miles northwest of Roxana, Delaware
  - coordinates: 38°30′37″N 075°10′39″W
  - elevation: 30 ft (9.1 m)
- Mouth: Dirickson Creek
  - location: about 0.25 miles north of Fenwick West, Delaware
  - coordinates: 38°29′32″N 075°07′44″W
  - elevation: 0 ft (0 m)
- Length: 3.93 mi (6.32 km)
- Basin size: 2.61 square miles (6.8 km^{2})
- Discharge
  - average: 2.58 cu ft/s (0.073 m^{3}/s) at mouth with Dirickson Creek

Basin features
- Progression: generally southeast
- River system: Little Assawoman Bay
- Tributaries
  - left: unnamed tributaries
  - right: unnamed tributaries
- Bridges: DE 20; Bennett Road; DE 17; DE 370; Bayard Road; Old Mill Bridge Road

Agricultural Ditch is a 3.93 mi (6.32 km) long 2nd order tributary to Dirickson Creek, in Sussex County, Delaware.

== Variant names ==
According to the Geographic Names Information System, it has also been known historically as:

- Carey Branch

== Course ==
Agricultural Ditch rises on the McCray Branch divide about 0.25 miles northwest of Roxana in Sussex County, Delaware. Agricultural Ditch then flows generally southeast to meet Dirickson Creek about 0.25 miles north of Fenwick West, Delaware.

== Watershed ==
Agricultural Ditch drains 2.61 square miles (6.8 km^{2}) of area, receives about 44.7 in/year of precipitation, has a topographic wetness index of 721.07 and is about 7.3% forested.

== See also ==
- List of rivers of Delaware
