= Iron Branch (Whartons Branch tributary) =

Iron Branch Tributary to Whartons Branch
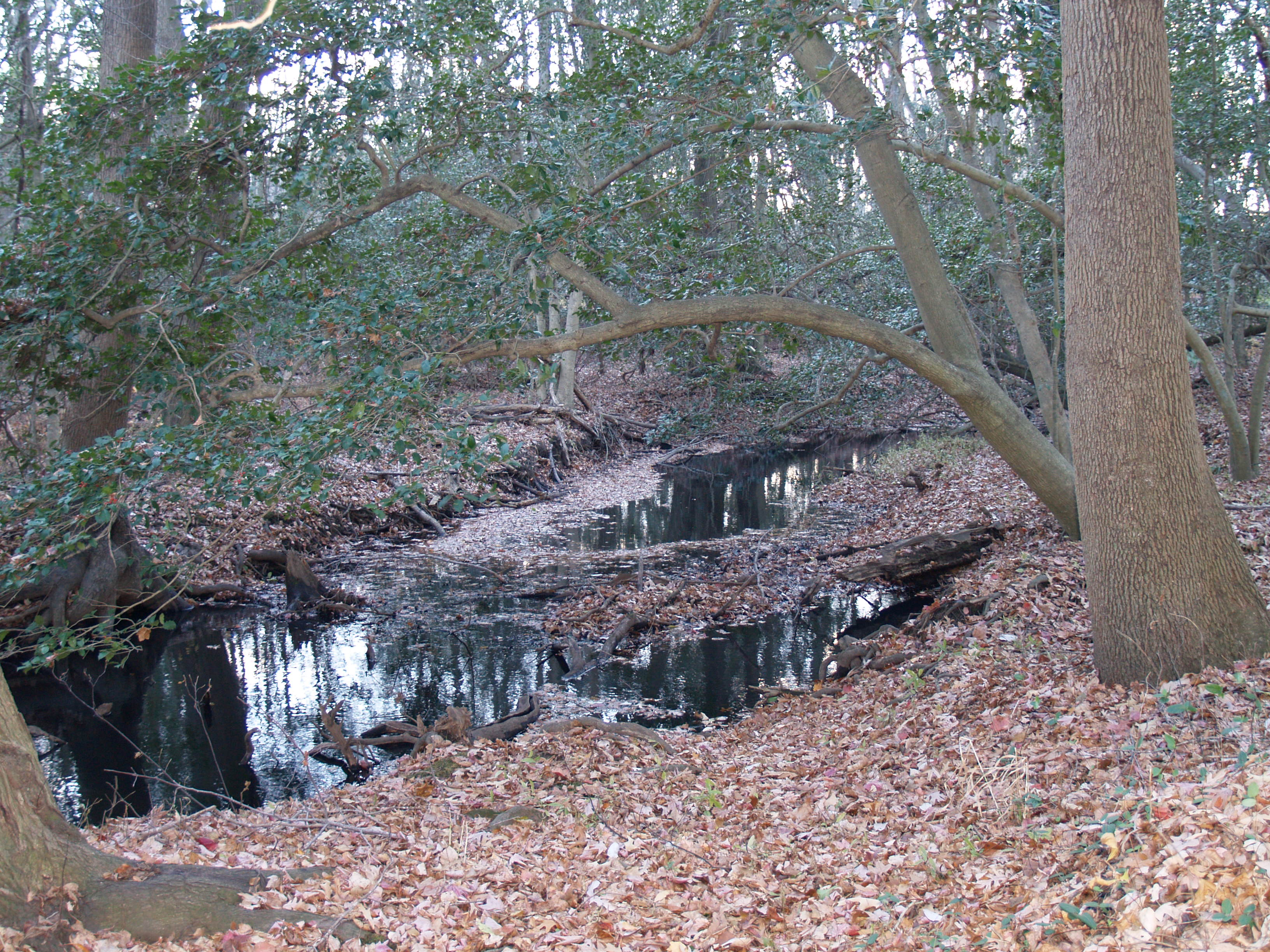
- Iron Branch in Delaware

- Location within Delaware Location within the United States

Location
- Country: United States
- State: Delaware
- County: Sussex

Physical characteristics
- Source: confluence of Wiley Branch Ditch and Houston-Thorogood Ditch
  - location: about 0.5 miles west-southwest of Phillips Hill
  - coordinates: 38°33′41″N 075°18′59″W
  - elevation: 29 ft (8.8 m)
- Mouth: Whartons Branch
  - location: Riverview, Delaware
  - coordinates: 38°34′47″N 075°16′18″W
  - elevation: 0 ft (0 m)
- Length: 1.16 mi (1.87 km)
- Basin size: 15.09 square miles (39.1 km^{2})
- Discharge
  - average: 12.77 cu ft/s (0.362 m^{3}/s) at mouth with Whartons Branch

Basin features
- Progression: generally northeast
- River system: Indian River
- Tributaries
  - left: Wiley Branch Ditch
  - right: Houston-Thorogood Ditch
- Bridges: Handy Road; US 113; Mitchell Street

Iron Branch is a 1.16 mi (1.87 km) long 2nd order tributary to Whartons Branch, in Sussex County, Delaware.

== Variant names ==
According to the Geographic Names Information System, it has also been known historically as:

- Duck Head Creek

== Course ==
Iron Branch is formed at the confluence of Wiley Branch Ditch and Houston-Thorogood Ditch about 0.5 miles west-southwest of Phillips Hill in Sussex County, Delaware. Iron Branch then flows generally northeast to meet Whartons Branch at Riverview, Delaware.

== Watershed ==
Iron Branch drains 15.09 square miles (39.1 km^{2}) of area, receives about 45.0 in/year of precipitation, has a topographic wetness index of 834.86 and is about 5.6% forested.

== See also ==
- List of rivers of Delaware
