= Arnell Creek (Love Creek tributary) =

Arnell Creek Tributary to Love Creek
- Location within Delaware Location within the United States

Location
- Country: United States
- State: Delaware
- County: Sussex

Physical characteristics
- Source: Munchy Branch divide
  - location: at Breezewood, Delaware
  - coordinates: 38°42′55″N 075°08′06″W
  - elevation: 20 ft (6.1 m)
- Mouth: Love Creek
  - location: at Robinson Landing, Delaware
  - coordinates: 38°41′24″N 075°08′16″W
  - elevation: 0 ft (0 m)
- Length: 2.09 mi (3.36 km)
- Basin size: 1.63 square miles (4.2 km^{2})
- Discharge
  - average: 1.96 cu ft/s (0.056 m^{3}/s) at mouth with Love Creek

Basin features
- Progression: South-southeast
- River system: Rehoboth Bay
- Tributaries
  - left: unnamed tributaries
  - right: unnamed tributaries

Arnell Creek is a 3.09 mi (4.97 km) long 1st order tributary to Love Creek, in Sussex County, Delaware.

== Variant names ==
According to the Geographic Names Information System, it has also been known historically as:

- Arnells Creek
- Arnold Creek

== Course ==
Arnell Creek rises on the Munchy Branch divide at Breezewood in Sussex County, Delaware. Arnell Creek then flows south-southeast to meet Love Creek at Robinson Landing.

== Watershed ==
Arnell Creek drains 1.63 square miles (4.2 km^{2}) of area, receives about 45.3 in/year of precipitation, has a topographic wetness index of 547.46 and is about 8.0% forested.

== See also ==
- List of rivers of Delaware
