= Hollandsville, Delaware =

Unincorporated community in Delaware, United States

- Unincorporated community
- Location within Delaware Location within the United States
- Coordinates: 38°59′07″N 75°39′58″W
- Country: United States
- State: Delaware
- County: Kent
- Elevation: 66 ft (20 m)
- Time zone: UTC-5 (Eastern (EST))
  - Summer (DST): UTC-4 (EDT)
- Area code: 302
- GNIS feature ID: 216113

Hollandsville is an unincorporated community in Kent County, Delaware, United States. Hollandsville is located at the intersection of Delaware Route 12 and Spectrum Farms Road/Hills Market Road, west of Felton.
