= Parker and Sampson Ditch =

Stream in Delaware, USA

Parker and Sampson Ditch Tributary to Marshyhope Creek
- Location of Parker and Sampson Ditch mouth Parker and Sampson Ditch (the United States)

Location
- Country: United States
- State: Delaware
- County: Sussex

Physical characteristics
- Source: Polk and Bee Branch divides
  - location: about 1-mile southwest of Greenwood, Delaware
  - coordinates: 38°47′42.00″N 075°38′8.00″W
  - elevation: 59 ft (18 m)
- Mouth: Marshyhope Creek
  - location: about 0.5 miles north-northeast of Woodenhawk, Delaware
  - coordinates: 38°48′33.41″N 075°40′55.75″W
  - elevation: 30 ft (9.1 m)
- Length: 3.72 mi (5.99 km)
- Basin size: 1.99 square miles (5.2 km^{2})
- Discharge
  - location: Marshyhope Creek
  - average: 2.45 cu ft/s (0.069 m^{3}/s) at mouth with Marshyhope Creek

Basin features
- Progression: Marshyhope Creek → Nanticoke River → Chesapeake Bay → Atlantic Ocean
- River system: Nanticoke River
- Tributaries
  - left: unnamed tributaries
  - right: unnamed tributaries
- Bridges: Blanchard Road, Double Fork Road

Parker and Sampson Ditch is a 3.72 mi (5.99 km) long first-order tributary to Marshyhope Creek in Sussex County, Delaware. This is the only stream of this name in the United States.

== Course ==
Parker and Sampson Ditch rises on the Polk and Bee Branch divides about 1-mile southwest of Greenwood, Delaware, and then flows northwest to join Marshyhope Creek about 0.5 miles north-northeast of Woodenhawk, Delaware.

== Watershed ==
Parker and Sampson Ditch drains 1.99 square miles (5.2 km^{2}) of area, receives about 45.0 in/year of precipitation, and is about 17.62% forested.

== See also ==
- List of rivers of Delaware
