= Augustine Creek (Delaware Bay tributary) =

Stream in Delaware, USA

Augustine Creek Tributary to Delaware Bay
- Location of Augustine Creek mouth Augustine Creek (Delaware Bay tributary) (the United States)

Location
- Country: United States
- State: Delaware
- County: New Castle

Physical characteristics
- Source: divide between Augustine Creek, Scott Run, and Drawyers Creek
  - location: Boyds Corner, Delaware
  - coordinates: 39°30′06″N 075°39′32″W
  - elevation: 30 ft (9.1 m)
- Mouth: Delaware Bay
  - location: Augustine Beach, Delaware
  - coordinates: 39°29′44″N 075°35′13″W
  - elevation: 0 ft (0 m)
- Length: 4.54 mi (7.31 km)
- Basin size: 6.19 square miles (16.0 km^{2})
- Discharge
  - location: Delaware Bay
  - average: 7.11 cu ft/s (0.201 m^{3}/s) at mouth with Delaware Bay

Basin features
- Progression: generally east
- River system: Delaware Bay
- Tributaries
  - left: unnamed tributaries
  - right: unnamed tributaries

Augustine Creek is a 4.54 mi (7.31 km) long tributary of Delaware Bay in New Castle County, Delaware. Augustine Creek is tidal for most of its course.

== See also ==
- List of Delaware rivers
