= Beaverdam Creek (Broadkill River tributary) =

Stream in Delaware, USA

Beaverdam Creek Tributary to Broadkill River
- Location of Beaverdam Creek mouth Beaverdam Creek (Broadkill River tributary) (the United States)

Location
- Country: United States
- State: Delaware
- County: Sussex

Physical characteristics
- Source: Welsh Branch divide
  - location: about 1 mi (1.6 km) southeast of Bennum, Delaware
  - coordinates: 38°41′51.41″N 075°17′32.69″W
  - elevation: 40 ft (12 m)
- Mouth: Broadkill River
  - location: about 0.25 mi (0.40 km) miles west of Drawbridge, Delaware
  - coordinates: 38°47′20.40″N 075°15′11.68″W
  - elevation: 0 ft (0 m)
- Length: 8.24 mi (13.26 km)
- Basin size: 9.45 square miles (24.5 km^{2})
- Discharge
  - location: Broadkill River
  - average: 11.21 cu ft/s (0.317 m^{3}/s) at mouth with Broadkill River

Basin features
- Progression: Broadkill River → Delaware Bay → Atlantic Ocean
- River system: Broadkill River
- Tributaries
  - left: unnamed tributaries
  - right: unnamed tributaries
- Bridges: Doddtown Road, US 9, Harbeson Road, Carpenter Road, Walker Road, Cave Neck Road

Beaverdam Creek is a 3.24 mi (5.21 km) long first-order tributary to the Broadkill River in Sussex County, Delaware.

== Course ==
Beaverdam Creek rises on the Welsh Branch divide about 1 mi (1.6 km) southeast of Bennum, Delaware and then flows generally northeast to join the Broadkill River about 0.25 mi (0.40 km) west of Drawbridge, Delaware.

== Watershed ==
Beaverdam Creek drains 9.45 square miles (24.5 km^{2}) of area, receives about 45.2 in/year of precipitation, and is about 23.28% forested.

== See also ==
- List of rivers of Delaware
