= Lingo Creek =

- Location within Delaware

Location
- Country: United States
- State: Delaware
- County: Sussex

Physical characteristics
- Source: On the watershed divide between Lingo Creek and Guinea Creek
  - location: Pot Nets, Delaware
  - coordinates: 38°37′36″N 075°10′41″W
  - elevation: 10 ft (3.0 m)
- Mouth: just west of Pot Nets, Delaware
  - location: Pot Nets, Delaware
  - coordinates: 38°36′38″N 075°09′28″W
  - elevation: 10 ft (3.0 m)

Basin features
- Progression: southeast
- River system: Indian River Bay

Lingo Creek is a 1.7-mile-long (2.7 km) stream flowing southeast to Indian River Bay, 7.5 miles (12.1 km) northeast of Frankford in Sussex County, Delaware.

== See also ==
- List of rivers of Delaware
- Lingo Point
