= South Davis Millpond Branch =

Stream in Maryland, USA

South Davis Millpond Branch Tributary to Marshyhope Creek
- Location of South Davis Millpond Branch mouth South Davis Millpond Branch (the United States)

Location
- Country: United States
- State: Maryland
- County: Dorchester

Physical characteristics
- Source: Green Briar Branch divide
  - location: pond about 5 miles southeast of Federalsburg, Maryland
  - coordinates: 38°38′20.41″N 075°42′51.75″W
  - elevation: 44 ft (13 m)
- Mouth: Davis Millpond Branch
  - location: about 3 miles southeast of Federalsburg, Maryland
  - coordinates: 38°39′54.41″N 075°45′27.76″W
  - elevation: 0 ft (0 m)
- Length: 1.96 mi (3.15 km)
- Basin size: 3.91 square miles (10.1 km^{2})
- Discharge
  - location: Davis Millpond Branch
  - average: 2.22 cu ft/s (0.063 m^{3}/s) at mouth with Davis Millpond Branch

Basin features
- Progression: Davis Millpond Branch → Marshyhope Creek → Nanticoke River → Chesapeake Bay → Atlantic Ocean
- River system: Nanticoke River
- Tributaries
  - left: unnamed tributaries
  - right: unnamed tributaries
- Bridges: Adams Road, Eldorado-Federalsburg Road

South Davis Millpond Branch is a 1.96 mi (3.15 km) long second-order tributary to Davis Millpond Branch in Dorchester County, Maryland. This is the only stream of this name in the United States.

== Course ==
South Davis Millpond Branch rises about 5 miles (8.0 km) southeast of Federalsburg, Maryland and then flows generally northwest to join North Davis Millpond Branch to form Davis Millpond Branch about 3 miles (4.8 km) southeast of Federalsburg, Maryland.

== Watershed ==
South Davis Millpond Branch drains 3.91 square miles (10.1 km^{2}) of area, receives about 44.5 in/year of precipitation, and is about 5.01% forested.

== See also ==
- List of Maryland rivers
- List of rivers of the United States
