= Delaware Route 18 =

State highway in Sussex County Delaware, United States

Delaware Route 18

Route information
- Maintained by DelDOT
- Length: 19.35 mi (31.14 km)
- Existed: 1936–present

Major junctions
- West end: MD 318 near Federalsburg, MD
- US 13 near Cannon; DE 404 near Bridgeville; US 113 in Georgetown
- East end: US 9 / DE 404 in Georgetown

Location
- Country: United States
- State: Delaware
- Counties: Sussex

Highway system
- Delaware State Route System; List; Byways
← DE 17	→ DE 20

Delaware Route 18 (DE 18) is a state highway located in Sussex County, Delaware. It runs from Maryland Route 318 (MD 318) at the Maryland border east of Federalsburg, Maryland, east to U.S. Route 9 (US 9) in Georgetown. DE 18 runs concurrent with DE 404 from its intersection with that highway southeast of Bridgeville to the eastern terminus, where DE 404 continues eastward to Five Points on US 9. The route passes through rural areas of western Sussex County. What would become DE 18 was built as a state highway in stages during the 1920s and 1930s. By 1936, DE 18 was designated to run from the Maryland border east through Georgetown to Lewes. In 1974, the route east of Georgetown was replaced by US 9 and US 9 Business (US 9 Bus.). DE 404 was designated concurrent with the eastern portion of DE 18 by 1987.

== Route description ==
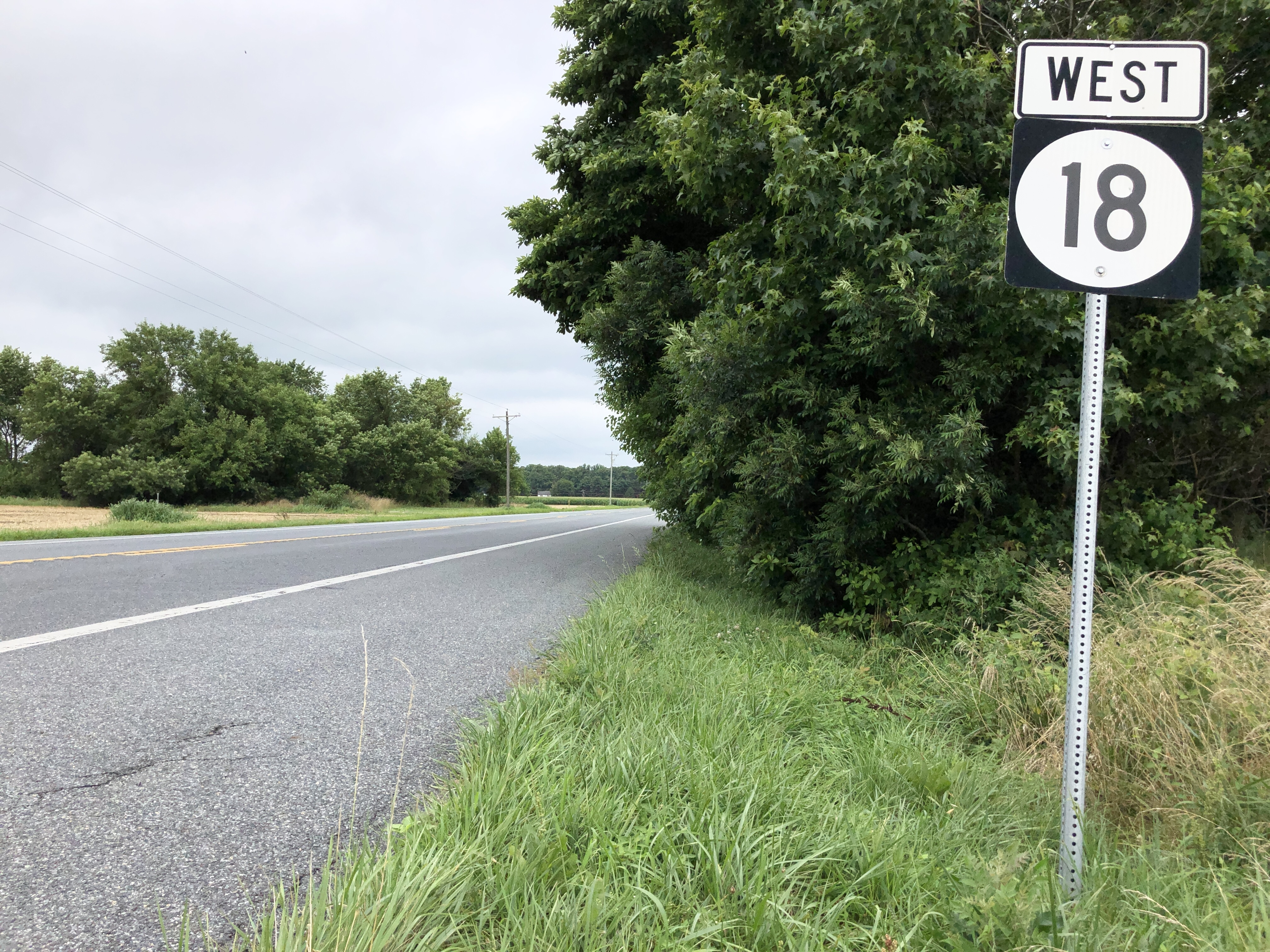
DE 18 westbound in Clarksons Crossroads

DE 18 begins at the Maryland border, where the road continues west into that state as MD 318. From the state line, the route heads east on two-lane undivided Federalsburg Road, passing through agricultural areas with some woods and homes. The road runs through the community of Atlanta, where it crosses Atlanta Road. After passing through the community of Clarksons Crossroads, DE 18 turns southeast onto Cannon Road while Federalsburg Road continues northeast toward the town of Bridgeville. The road continues to the community of Cannon, where it crosses the Delmarva Central Railroad's Delmarva Subdivision line at-grade. East of Cannon, the route passes south of the town limits of Bridgeville, crossing Clear Brook before it comes to an intersection with US 13. Following this, DE 18 heads northeast through farm fields, reaching a junction with DE 404.

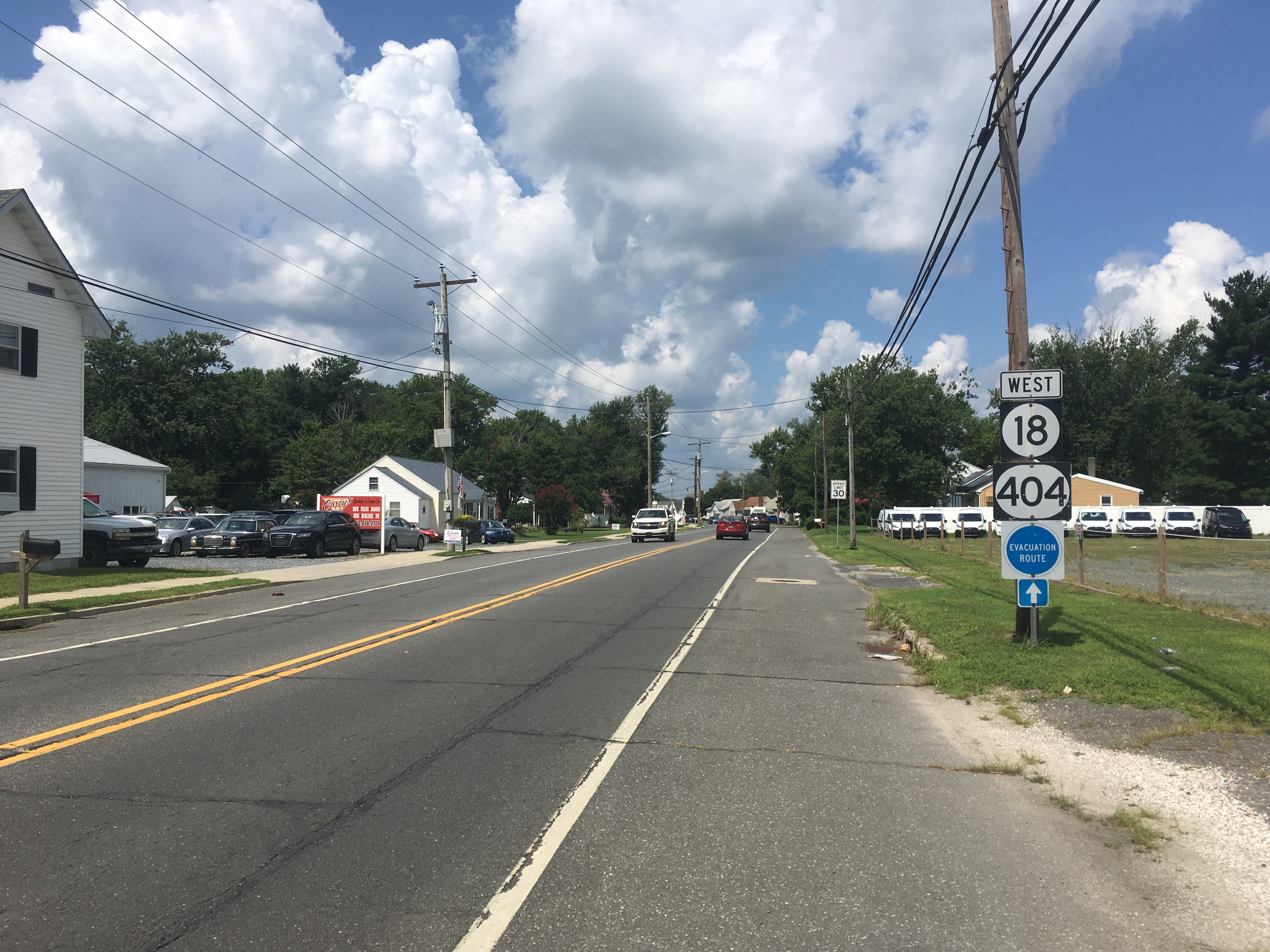
DE 18/DE 404 westbound in Georgetown

At this point, DE 18 heads east concurrent with DE 404 along Seashore Highway through a mix of farmland and woodland with some residences and businesses. The road crosses the Nanticoke River and passes through tracts of the Redden State Forest, heading across Gravelly Branch to the south of Collins Pond and crossing Deep Creek further east. DE 18/DE 404 enters the town of Georgetown and becomes Bridgeville Road, running to the north of the Jack F. Owens Campus of Delaware Technical Community College. The road intersects US 113 and the western terminus of DE 404 Truck in a commercial area and continues east. The two routes head southeast onto North Bedford Street, passing homes and businesses. The road intersects US 9 at a traffic circle called The Circle in the center of Georgetown, where the Sussex County Courthouse is located. At this point, DE 18 ends and DE 404 continues east along US 9.

The section of DE 18 concurrent with DE 404 serves as part of a primary hurricane evacuation route from the Delaware Beaches to points inland. DE 18 has an annual average daily traffic count ranging from a high of 20,266 vehicles at the US 113 intersection to a low of 2,128 vehicles at the US 13 intersection. The portion of DE 18 concurrent with DE 404 is part of the National Highway System.

== History ==
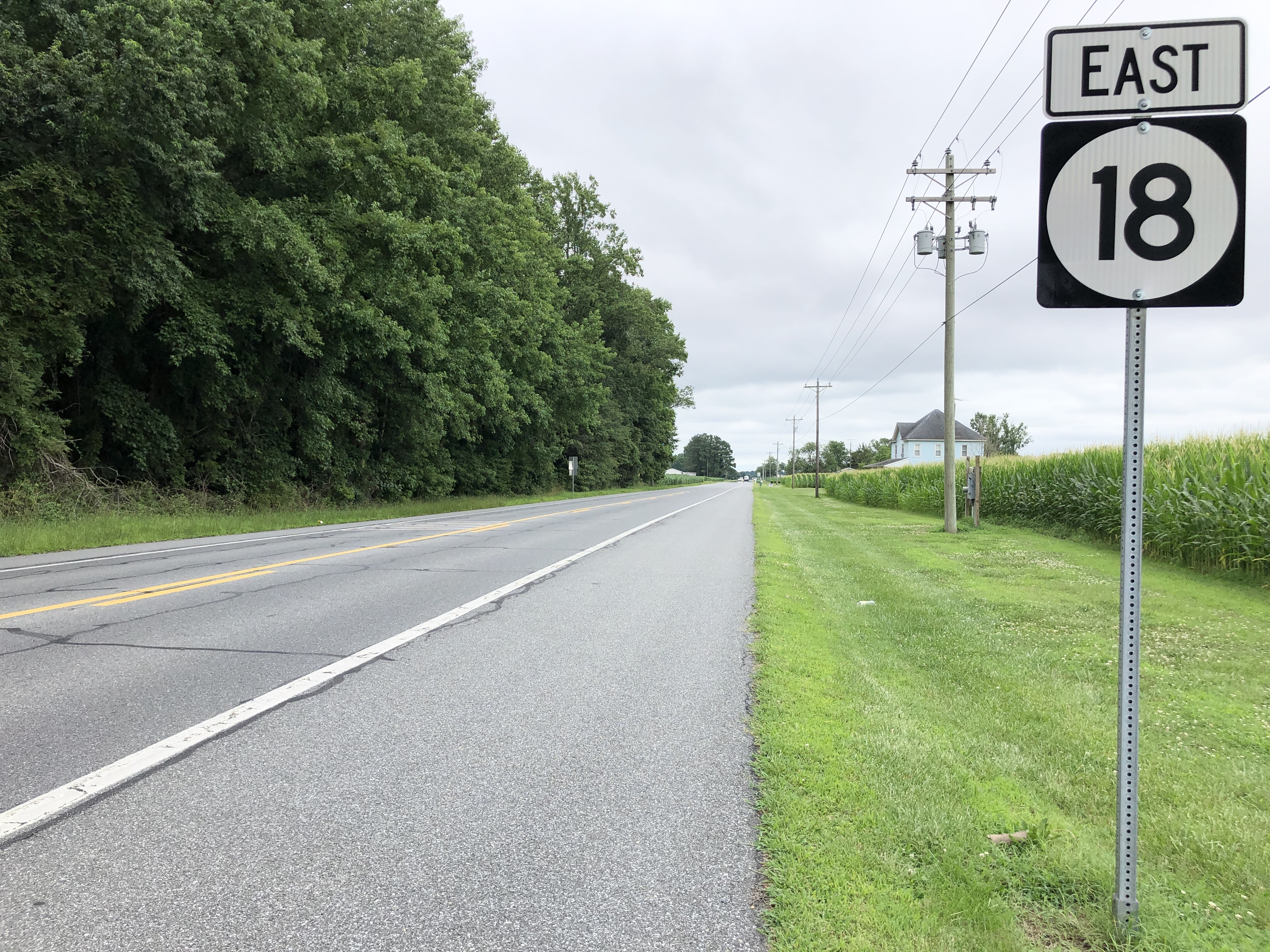
DE 18 eastbound west of Cannon

By 1920, what would eventually become DE 18 was under contract as a state highway from southeast of Bridgeville to Georgetown and from Georgetown to Harbeson; the remainder existed as an unimproved county road. The state highway was completed between Cannon and present-day US 13 and from southeast of Bridgeville east to Lewes by 1924, with the exception of a portion within Georgetown. The part of present-day DE 18 west of Clarksons Crossroads was under proposal as a state highway by this time also. A year later, the portions of the route west of Clarksons Crossroads and within Georgetown were upgraded to state highway status. In 1927, plans were made to replace the 1914-built county-maintained bascule bridge over the Lewes and Rehoboth Canal in Lewes. Replacement of this bridge by the state was completed in 1929. By 1931, the state highway was finished between Clarksons Crossroads and Cannon. The portion of road from US 13 east to the current west end of the DE 404 concurrency was completed as a state highway a year later.

DE 18 was designated to run from the Maryland border west of Cannon east to Lewes Beach on the Delaware Bay by 1936, following its current alignment east to Georgetown and continuing east through Gravel Hill, Harbeson, and Lewes. In 1974, the eastern terminus of DE 18 was cut back to its current location in Georgetown, with an extended US 9 replacing the route between Georgetown and the Five Points intersection in Nassau and US 9 Bus. replacing DE 18 from Five Points to Lewes. DE 404 was extended east to run concurrent with DE 18 from east of Bridgevillle to Georgetown by 1987.

An interchange is planned with US 113 as part of improving that highway. The proposed interchange at US 113 is currently in the design phase, with construction expected to begin in 2024.

== Major intersections ==
The entire route is in Sussex County.

Location	mi	km	Destinations	Notes
	0.00	0.00	MD 318 west (Bridgeville Road) – Federalsburg, Denton	Maryland state line; western terminus
Cannon	7.56	12.17	US 13 (Sussex Highway) – Bridgeville, Seaford	
	9.06	14.58	DE 404 west (Seashore Highway) – Bridgeville, Denton	West end of DE 404 overlap
Georgetown	18.33	29.50	US 113 (Dupont Boulevard / DE 404 Truck east) – Milford, Millsboro, Beaches	Western terminus of DE 404 Truck
Georgetown	19.35	31.14	US 9 / DE 404 east (Market Street) to US 113 – Laurel, Beaches, Airport, Cape May–Lewes Ferry	Traffic circle; eastern terminus
1.000 mi = 1.609 km; 1.000 km = 0.621 mi: Concurrency terminus
