= North Davis Millpond Branch =

Stream in Maryland, USA

North Davis Millpond Branch Tributary to Marshyhope Creek
- Location of North Davis Millpond Branch mouth North Davis Millpond Branch (the United States)

Location
- Country: United States
- State: Maryland
- County: Dorchester

Physical characteristics
- Source: Horse Pen Branch divide
  - location: pond about 4 miles southeast of Federalsburg, Maryland
  - coordinates: 38°39′20.41″N 075°45′29.00″W
  - elevation: 45 ft (14 m)
- Mouth: Davis Millpond Branch
  - location: about 3 miles southeast of Federalsburg, Maryland
  - coordinates: 38°39′53.41″N 075°48′22.76″W
  - elevation: 0 ft (0 m)
- Length: 1.11 mi (1.79 km)
- Basin size: 3.01 square miles (7.8 km^{2})
- Discharge
  - location: Davis Millpond Branch
  - average: 3.52 cu ft/s (0.100 m^{3}/s) at mouth with Davis Millpond Branch

Basin features
- Progression: Davis Millpond Branch → Marshyhope Creek → Nanticoke River → Chesapeake Bay → Atlantic Ocean
- River system: Nanticoke River
- Tributaries
  - left: unnamed tributaries
  - right: unnamed tributaries
- Bridges: Oak Grove Road, Eldorado-Federalsburg Road

North Davis Millpond Branch is a 3.11 mi (5.01 km) long second-order tributary to Marshyhope Creek in Dorchester County, Maryland. This is the only stream of this name in the United States.

== Course ==
North Davis Millpond Branch rises in a pond about 4 miles (6.4 km) southeast of Federalsburg, Maryland and then flows generally northwest to join South Davis Millpond Branch to form Davis Millpond Branch about 3 miles (4.8 km) southeast of Federalsburg, Maryland.

== Watershed ==
North Davis Millpond Branch drains 3.01 square miles (7.8 km^{2}) of area, receives about 44.6 in/year of precipitation, and is about 7.21% forested.

== See also ==
- List of Maryland rivers
