= Maryland Route 306 =

State highway in Maryland, United States

Maryland Route 306
- Houston Branch Road
- Maryland Route 306 highlighted in red

Route information
- Maintained by MDSHA
- Length: 4.13 mi (6.65 km)
- Existed: 1927–present

Major junctions
- West end: Central Avenue in Federalsburg
- East end: Dublin Hill Road at the Delaware state line near Federalsburg

Location
- Country: United States
- State: Maryland
- Counties: Caroline

Highway system
- Maryland highway system; Interstate; US; State; Scenic Byways
← MD 305	→ MD 307

Maryland Route 306 (MD 306) is a state highway in the U.S. state of Maryland. Known as Houston Branch Road, the state highway runs 4.13 miles (6.65 km) from the town limits of Federalsburg, where the road continues as Central Avenue to MD 315, east to the Delaware state line, where the road continues as Dublin Hill Road. MD 306 provides access to Idylwild Wildlife Management Area. The state highway was constructed in the late 1930s.

== Route description ==
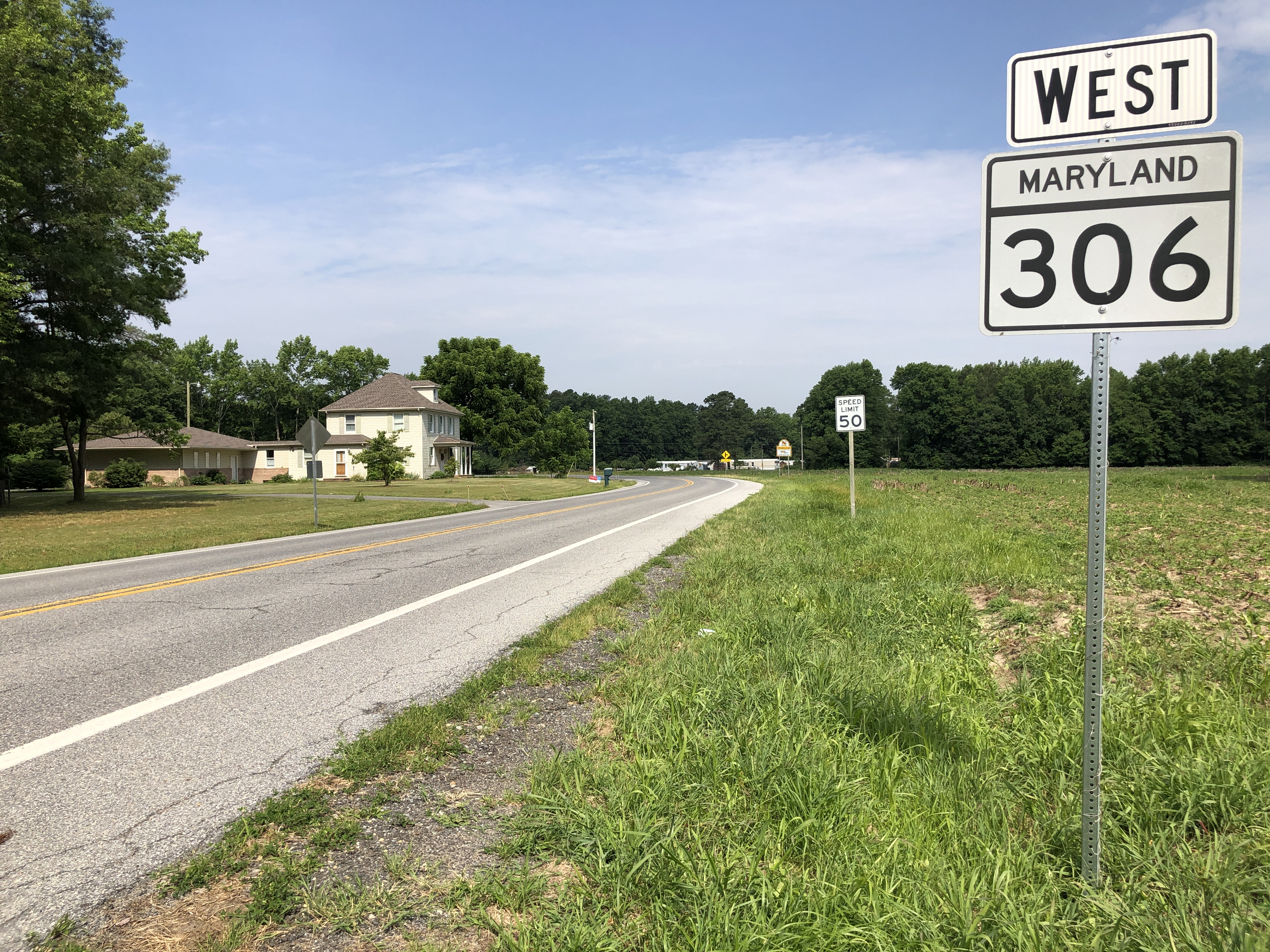
View west along MD 306 at the Delaware state line near Federalsburg

MD 306 begins at the eastern town limits of Federalsburg adjacent to Lake Chambers, an impoundment of Tanyard Branch. The roadway continues west as Central Avenue toward an intersection with MD 315 (Liberty Road) east of downtown Federalsburg. MD 306 heads northeast as a two-lane undivided road, passing through a mix of farmland and forest. The state highway also follows the eastern edge of Idylwild Wildlife Management Area. After crossing Houston Branch, MD 306 curves to the east and reaches its eastern terminus at the Delaware state line, where the highway continues into Sussex County as Dublin Hill Road, which heads east to an intersection with Delaware Route 404 (Seashore Highway) northwest of the town of Bridgeville.

== History ==
Approximately 1 mile (1.6 km) of Houston Branch Road from the Federalsburg end was paved as a state-aid road by 1910. That short portion of highway was reconstructed and the remainder of MD 306 constructed as a modern highway in 1938 and 1939. MD 306 originally included Central Avenue west to Liberty Road, which was originally MD 318 and became MD 315 after the completion of the Federalsburg Bypass in 1964. The portion of highway within the town of Federalsburg was removed from MD 306 by 1999.

== Junction list ==
The entire route is in Caroline County.

Location	mi	km	Destinations	Notes
Federalsburg	0.00	0.00	Central Avenue west – Federalsburg	Western terminus
	4.13	6.65	Dublin Hill Road east – Dublin Hill, Bridgeville	Delaware state line; eastern terminus
1.000 mi = 1.609 km; 1.000 km = 0.621 mi
