= Miles Branch (Marshyhope Creek tributary) =

Stream in Maryland, USA

Miles Branch Tributary to Marshyhope Creek
- Location of Miles Branch mouth Miles Branch (Marshyhope Creek tributary) (the United States)

Location
- Country: United States
- State: Maryland
- County: Dorchester; Caroline
- Town: Federalsburg

Physical characteristics
- Source: Horse Pen Branch divide
  - location: about 3 miles southeast of Federalsburg, Maryland
  - coordinates: 38°40′23.41″N 075°43′1.75″W
  - elevation: 43 ft (13 m)
- Mouth: Marshyhope Creek
  - location: southeast end of Federalsburg, Maryland
  - coordinates: 38°41′8.41″N 075°46′9.76″W
  - elevation: 0 ft (0 m)
- Length: 3.17 mi (5.10 km)
- Basin size: 2.18 square miles (5.6 km^{2})
- Discharge
  - location: Marshyhope Creek
  - average: 2.55 cu ft/s (0.072 m^{3}/s) at mouth with Marshyhope Creek

Basin features
- Progression: Marshyhope Creek → Nanticoke River → Chesapeake Bay → Atlantic Ocean
- River system: Nanticoke River
- Tributaries
  - left: unnamed tributaries
  - right: unnamed tributaries
- Bridges: Kinder Road, Guard Road, Wright Road

Miles Branch is a 3.17 mi (5.10 km) long first-order tributary to Marshyhope Creek in Dorchester County, Maryland. For part of its length, this stream forms the boundary of Caroline and Dorchester Counties.

== Course ==
Miles Branch rises about 3 miles (4.8 km) southeast of Federalsburg, Maryland in Caroline County and then flows generally northwest to join Marshyhope Creek in the southeast end of Federalsburg, Maryland.

== Watershed ==
Miles Branch drains 2.18 square miles (5.6 km^{2}) of area, receives about 44.6 in/year of precipitation, and is about 13.57% forested.

== See also ==
- List of Maryland rivers
- List of rivers of the United States
