= Davis Millpond Branch =

Stream in Maryland, USA

Davis Millpond Branch Tributary to Marshyhope Creek
- Location of Davis Millpond Branch mouth Davis Millpond Branch (the United States)

Location
- Country: United States
- State: Maryland
- County: Dorchester

Physical characteristics
- Source: Confluence of North and South Branch of Davis Millpond Branch
  - location: about 3 miles southeast of Federalsburg, Maryland
  - coordinates: 38°39′54.00″N 075°45′29.00″W
  - elevation: 26 ft (7.9 m)
- Mouth: Marshyhope Creek
  - location: about 0.5 miles south of Federalsburg, Maryland
  - coordinates: 38°40′29.41″N 075°46′22.76″W
  - elevation: 0 ft (0 m)
- Length: 1.18 mi (1.90 km)
- Basin size: 5.46 square miles (14.1 km^{2})
- Discharge
  - location: Marshyhope Creek
  - average: 6.34 cu ft/s (0.180 m^{3}/s) at mouth with Marshyhope Creek

Basin features
- Progression: Marshyhope Creek → Nanticoke River → Chesapeake Bay → Atlantic Ocean
- River system: Nanticoke River
- Tributaries
  - left: South Davis Millpond Branch
  - right: North Davis Millpond Branch
- Bridges: none

Davis Millpond Branch is a 1.18 mi (1.90 km) long third-order tributary to Marshyhope Creek in Dorchester County, Maryland. This is the only stream of this name in the United States.

== Course ==
Davis Millpond Branch rises about 3 miles (4.8 km) southeast of Federalsburg, Maryland and then flows northwest to join Marshyhope Creek about 0.5 miles (0.80 km) southeast of Federalsburg, Maryland.

== Watershed ==
Davis Millpond Branch drains 5.46 square miles (14.1 km^{2}) of area, receives about 44.5 in/year of precipitation, and is about 10.02% forested.

== See also ==
- List of Maryland rivers
