= Skinners Run =

Stream in Maryland, USA

Skinners Run Tributary to Marshyhope Creek
- Location of Skinners Run mouth Skinners Run (the United States)

Location
- Country: United States
- State: Maryland
- County: Dorchester

Physical characteristics
- Source: Hunting Creek divide
  - location: about 3 miles west of Federalsburg, Maryland
  - coordinates: 38°42′1.00″N 075°50′25.00″W
  - elevation: 48 ft (15 m)
- Mouth: Marshyhope Creek
  - location: about 3 miles southwest of Federalsburg, Maryland
  - coordinates: 38°39′18.41″N 075°48′19.76″W
  - elevation: 0 ft (0 m)
- Length: 3.91 mi (6.29 km)
- Basin size: 5.26 square miles (13.6 km^{2})
- Discharge
  - location: Marshyhope Creek
  - average: 5.92 cu ft/s (0.168 m^{3}/s) at mouth with Marshyhope Creek

Basin features
- Progression: Marshyhope Creek → Nanticoke River → Chesapeake Bay → Atlantic Ocean
- River system: Nanticoke River
- Tributaries
  - left: unnamed tributaries
  - right: unnamed tributaries
- Bridges: Hubbard Road, Skinners Run Road, Whiteley Road, MD 307, River Road

Skinners Run is a 3.91 mi (6.29 km) long second-order tributary to Marshyhope Creek in Dorchester County, Maryland. This is the only stream of this name in the United States.

== Course ==
Skinners Run rises about 3 miles (4.8 km) west of Federalsburg, Maryland and then flows southeast to join Marshyhope Creek about 3 miles (4.8 km) southwest of Federalsburg, Maryland.

== Watershed ==
Skinners Run drains 5.26 square miles (13.6 km^{2}) of area, receives about 44.5 in/year of precipitation, and is about 8.34% forested.

== See also ==
- List of Maryland rivers
- List of rivers in the United States
