= Tull Branch =

Stream in Maryland, USA

Tull Branch Tributary to Marshyhope Creek
- Location of Tull Branch mouth Tull Branch (the United States)

Location
- Country: United States
- State: Maryland
- County: Caroline

Physical characteristics
- Source: Fowling Creek divide
  - location: about 5 miles north-northwest of Federalsburg, Maryland
  - coordinates: 38°45′29.41″N 075°49′40.76″W
  - elevation: 48 ft (15 m)
- Mouth: Marshyhope Creek
  - location: about 1.5 miles north of Federalsburg, Maryland
  - coordinates: 38°43′5.41″N 075°46′11.76″W
  - elevation: 5 ft (1.5 m)
- Length: 4.03 mi (6.49 km)
- Basin size: 4.94 square miles (12.8 km^{2})
- Discharge
  - location: Marshyhope Creek
  - average: 5.72 cu ft/s (0.162 m^{3}/s) at mouth with Marshyhope Creek

Basin features
- Progression: Marshyhope Creek → Nanticoke River → Chesapeake Bay → Atlantic Ocean
- River system: Nanticoke River
- Tributaries
  - left: unnamed tributaries
  - right: unnamed tributaries
- Bridges: American Corner Road, Howard Road, Federalsburg Highway, Long Swamp Road, Smithville Road

Tull Branch is a 4.03 mi (6.49 km) long second-order tributary to Marshyhope Creek in Caroline County, Maryland. This is the only stream of this name in the United States.

== Course ==
Tull Branch rises about 5 miles (8.0 km) north-northwest of Federalsburg, Maryland and then flows southeast to join Marshyhope Creek about 1.5 miles (2.4 km) north of Federalsburg, Maryland.

== Watershed ==
Tull Branch drains 4.94 square miles (12.8 km^{2}) of area, receives about 44.5 in/year of precipitation, and is about 10.31% forested.

== See also ==
- List of Maryland rivers
- List of rivers of the United States
