= Faulkner Branch (Marshyhope Creek tributary) =

Stream in Maryland, USA

Faulkner Branch Tributary to Marshyhope Creek
- Location of Faulkner Branch mouth Faulkner Branch (Marshyhope Creek tributary) (the United States)

Location
- Country: United States
- State: Maryland
- County: Caroline

Physical characteristics
- Source: Fowling Creek divide
  - location: about 5 miles northwest of Federalsburg, Maryland
  - coordinates: 38°45′16.41″N 075°49′59.76″W
  - elevation: 58 ft (18 m)
- Mouth: Marshyhope Creek
  - location: about 1 mile north of Federalsburg, Maryland
  - coordinates: 38°42′32.41″N 075°46′28.76″W
  - elevation: 3 ft (0.91 m)
- Length: 6.34 mi (10.20 km)
- Basin size: 7.31 square miles (18.9 km^{2})
- Discharge
  - location: Marshyhope Creek
  - average: 10.96 cu ft/s (0.310 m^{3}/s) at mouth with Marshyhope Creek

Basin features
- Progression: Marshyhope Creek → Nanticoke River → Chesapeake Bay → Atlantic Ocean
- River system: Nanticoke River
- Tributaries
  - left: unnamed tributaries
  - right: unnamed tributaries
- Bridges: American Corner Road, Ischer Road, People Road, Bradley Road, Laurel Grove Road, MD 313, Denton Road

Faulkner Branch is a 6.34 mi (10.20 km) long second-order tributary to Marshyhope Creek in Caroline County, Maryland.

== Variant names ==
According to the Geographic Names Information System, it has also been known historically as:

- Faulkners Branch

== Course ==
Faulkner Branch rises about 5 miles (8.0 km) northwest of Federalsburg, Maryland and then flows generally southeast to join Marshyhope Creek about 1 mile (1.6 km) north of Federalsburg, Maryland.

== Watershed ==
Faulkner Branch drains 7.31 square miles (18.9 km^{2}) of area, receives about 44.5 in/year of precipitation, and is about 6.53% forested.

== See also ==
- List of Maryland rivers
- List of rivers of the United States
