= Maryland Route 315 =

State highway in Maryland, United States

Maryland Route 315
- Maryland Route 315 highlighted in red

Route information
- Maintained by MDSHA and Town of Federalsburg
- Length: 3.13 mi (5.04 km)
- Existed: 1964–present
- Tourist routes: Chesapeake Country Scenic Byway

Major junctions
- West end: MD 313 / MD 318 in Federalsburg
- East end: MD 318 near Federalsburg

Location
- Country: United States
- State: Maryland
- Counties: Caroline

Highway system
- Maryland highway system; Interstate; US; State; Scenic Byways
| ← MD 314 | → MD 316 |

Maryland Route 315 (MD 315) is a state highway in the U.S. state of Maryland. The state highway runs 3.13 miles (5.04 km) from MD 313 and MD 318 on the west side of Federalsburg east to MD 318 east of Federalsburg. MD 315, which is the old routing of MD 318 through downtown Federalsburg, is maintained by the town within the town limits and on either side of the town limits by the Maryland State Highway Administration (MDSHA). MD 315 follows what were sections of MD 319, MD 313, and MD 318, which were constructed between the late 1910s and mid-1920s. The highway became fully part of MD 318 in the mid-1950s. The highway was designated as MD 315 in the early 1960s after MD 318 was moved to the Federalsburg Bypass.

== Route description ==
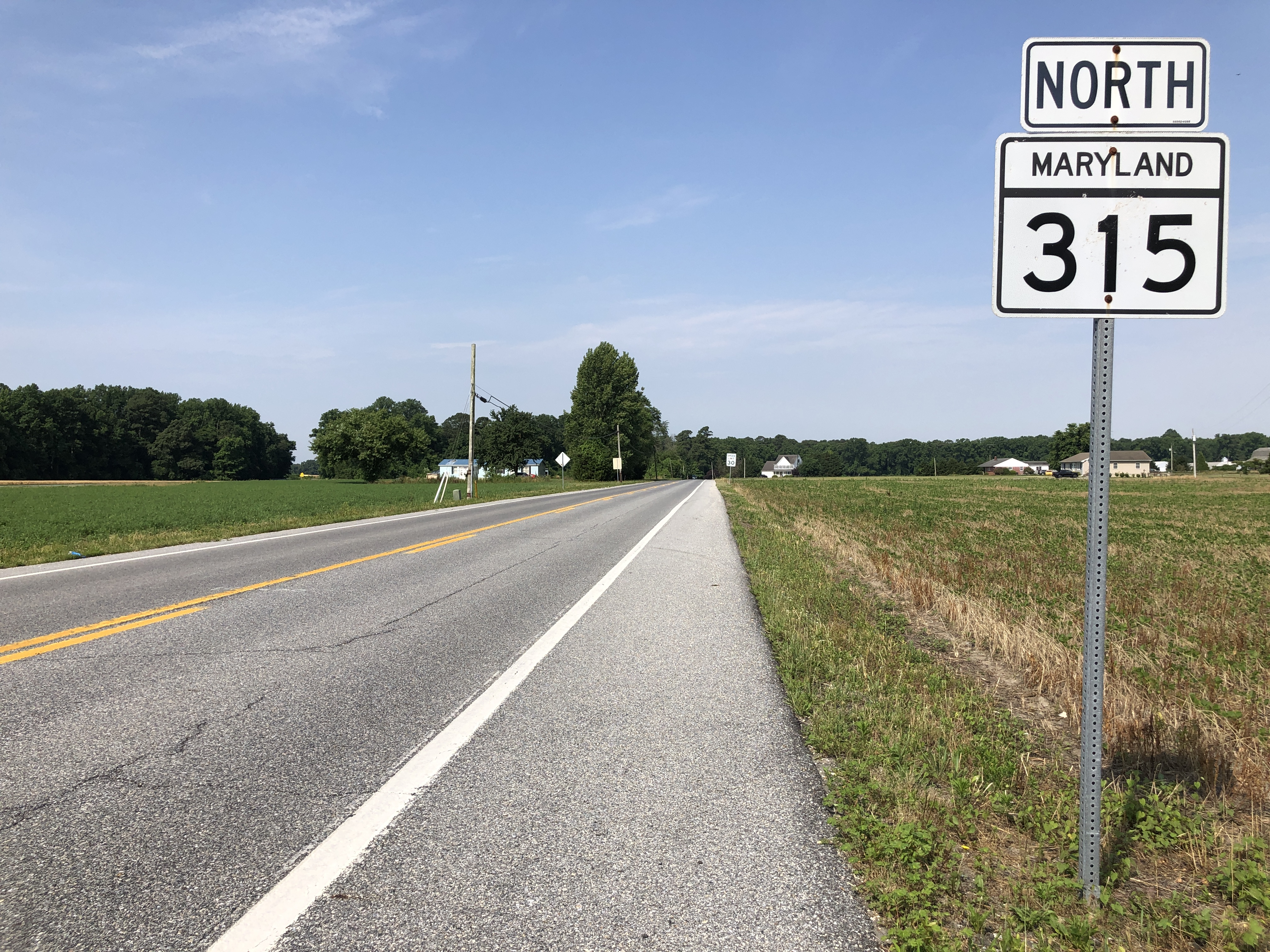
View north along MD 315 just northeast of Federalsburg

MD 315 begins at an intersection with MD 313 and MD 318 on the west side of Federalsburg. MD 313 heads north and south from the intersection as Federalsburg Highway. MD 318 heads west as Preston Road and south concurrent with MD 313. MD 315 heads east as two-lane undivided Bloomingdale Avenue through a commercial and industrial area. At University Avenue, the state highway enters the town limits of Federalsburg and municipal maintenance begins. After passing Denton Road, the old alignment of MD 313, MD 315's name changes to Main Street and the highway curves south into the central business district. At Central Avenue, Main Street continues south while MD 315 turns east onto Central Avenue to cross Marshyhope Creek. The state highway enters a residential area and intersects Reliance Avenue, the old alignment of MD 313 that heads south to the eastern MD 313-MD 318 intersection. MD 315 turns southeast onto Liberty Road while Central Avenue continues straight and leads to MD 306. After passing Bernard Avenue, the state highway leaves the town of Federalsburg and MDSHA maintenance resumes. MD 315 crosses Tanyard Branch shortly before the intersection with Liberty Church Road, where MD 315 turns south for a very short distance to reach its eastern terminus at MD 318 (Bridgeville Road).

== History ==
MD 315 is the old alignment of MD 318 through Federalsburg. The portion of MD 318 west of Federalsburg was originally MD 319 and the section of the highway between Denton Road and Reliance Avenue was part of MD 313. The Bloomingdale Avenue section of MD 319 west of the town limits was constructed as a state-aid road around 1919. The Liberty Road portion of the highway east of the town limits was built between 1924 and 1926. MD 318 was extended west through Federalsburg and over the whole length of MD 319 in 1956. MD 315 was designated on the old alignment of MD 318 following the transfer of MD 318 to the Federalsburg Bypass in 1964.

== Junction list ==
The entire route is in Caroline County.

| Location | mi | km | Destinations | Notes |
|---|---|---|---|---|
| Federalsburg | 0.00 | 0.00 | MD 313 (Federalsburg Highway) / MD 318 (Preston Road) – Easton, Eldorado, Denton | Western terminus |
| Federalsburg | 1.03 | 1.66 | Main Street south | MD 315 turns east onto Central Avenue |
| Federalsburg | 1.34 | 2.16 | Central Avenue east | MD 315 turns south onto Liberty Road |
| | 3.10 | 4.99 | Liberty Church Road north | MD 315 turns south at this intersection; one-way westbound MD 315A is old alignment and east leg of the intersection |
| | 3.13 | 5.04 | MD 318 (Bridgeville Road) – Bridgeville, Denton | Eastern terminus |
1.000 mi = 1.609 km; 1.000 km = 0.621 mi

== Auxiliary route ==
MD 315A is a 0.16-mile (0.26 km) connector between MD 318 and MD 315 at the Liberty Church Road intersection that runs one-way westbound.
