= Krafts Creek =

Stream in Maryland, USA

Krafts Creek Tributary to Marshyhope Creek
- Location of Krafts Creek mouth Krafts Creek (the United States)

Location
- Country: United States
- State: Maryland
- County: Dorchester

Physical characteristics
- Source: This stream begins in a tidal area
  - location: about 1.5 miles north-northwest of Walnut Landing, Maryland
  - coordinates: 38°32′25.00″N 075°46′22.00″W
  - elevation: 0 ft (0 m)
- Mouth: Marshyhope Creek
  - location: about 2 miles north-northwest of Walnut Landing, Maryland
  - coordinates: 38°32′52.42″N 075°46′26.76″W
  - elevation: 0 ft (0 m)
- Length: 0.6 mi (0.97 km)
- Basin size: 0.31 square miles (0.80 km^{2})
- Discharge
  - location: Marshyhope Creek
  - average: 0.33 cu ft/s (0.0093 m^{3}/s) at mouth with Marshyhope Creek

Basin features
- Progression: Marshyhope Creek → Nanticoke River → Chesapeake Bay → Atlantic Ocean
- River system: Nanticoke River
- Tributaries
  - left: unnamed tributaries
  - right: unnamed tributaries
- Bridges: none

Krafts Creek is a 0.6 mi (0.97 km) long first-order tributary to Marshyhope Creek in Dorchester County, Maryland.

== Course ==
Krafts Creek rises about 1.5 miles (2.4 km) north-northwest of Walnut Landing, Maryland in a tidal marsh and then flows north to join Marshyhope Creek about 2 miles (3.2 km) north-northwest of Walnut Landing, Maryland.

== Watershed ==
Krafts Creek drains 0.33 square miles (0.85 km^{2}) of area, receives about 44.0 in/year [CONVERT] of precipitation, and is about 3.94% forested.

== See also ==
- List of Maryland rivers
