= Prong Number One =

Stream in Delaware, USA

Prong Number One Tributary to Gravelly Branch
- Location of Prong Number One mouth Prong Number One (the United States)

Location
- Country: United States
- State: Delaware
- County: Sussex

Physical characteristics
- Source: Parker Branch divide
  - location: about 1.5 miles south-southeast of Oakley, Delaware
  - coordinates: 38°47′59″N 075°28′04″W
  - elevation: 44 ft (13 m)
- Mouth: Gravelly Branch
  - location: about 0.25 miles northwest of Kings Crossroads, Delaware
  - coordinates: 38°45′09″N 075°27′31″W
  - elevation: 29 ft (8.8 m)
- Length: 5.78 mi (9.30 km)
- Basin size: 13.38 square miles (34.7 km^{2})
- Discharge
  - location: Gravelly Branch (Collins Pond)
  - average: 16.57 cu ft/s (0.469 m^{3}/s) at mouth with Gravelly Branch

Basin features
- Progression: Gravelly Branch → Nanticoke River → Chesapeake Bay → Atlantic Ocean
- River system: Nanticoke River
- Tributaries
  - left: Maple Marsh and Beaver Dam Branch
  - right: unnamed tributaries
- Bridges: Staytonville Road, DE 16, Smith Haven Road, Beaver Dam Road, Maple Branch Road

Prong Number One is a 5.78 mi (9.30 km) long 3rd order tributary to Gravelly Branch in Sussex County, Delaware.

== Course ==
Prong Number One rises about 1.5 miles south-southeast of Oakley, Delaware, and then flows south to join Gravelly Branch about 0.25 miles northwest of Kings Crossroads.

== Watershed ==
Prong Number One drains 13.38 square miles (34.7 km^{2}) of area, receives about 45.4 in/year of precipitation, has a wetness index of 781.58, and is about 11% forested.

== See also ==
- List of rivers of Delaware
