= Smith-Short and Willin Ditch =

Stream in Delaware, USA

Smith-Short and Willin Ditch Tributary to Gravelly Branch
- Location of Smith-Short and Willin Ditch mouth Smith-Short and Willin Ditch (the United States)

Location
- Country: United States
- State: Delaware
- County: Sussex

Physical characteristics
- Source: Gum Branch divide
  - location: about 3 miles northeast of Gully Camp, Delaware
  - coordinates: 38°45′18″N 075°29′42″W
  - elevation: 44 ft (13 m)
- Mouth: Gravelly Branch
  - location: about 1.5 miles east-northeast of Coverdale Crossroads, Delaware
  - coordinates: 38°43′14″N 075°30′03″W
  - elevation: 29 ft (8.8 m)
- Length: 2.96 mi (4.76 km)
- Basin size: 2.45 square miles (6.3 km^{2})
- Discharge
  - location: Gravelly Branch (Collins Pond)
  - average: 2.89 cu ft/s (0.082 m^{3}/s) at mouth with Gravelly Branch

Basin features
- Progression: Gravelly Branch → Nanticoke River → Chesapeake Bay → Atlantic Ocean
- River system: Nanticoke River
- Tributaries
  - left: unnamed tributaries
  - right: unnamed tributaries
- Waterbodies: Collins Pond
- Bridges: Deer Forest Road, Russell Road

Smith-Short and Willin Ditch is a 2.96 mi (4.76 km) long 1st order tributary to Gravelly Branch in Sussex County, Delaware.

== Course ==
Smith-Short and Willin Ditch rises about 3 miles east-northeast of Gully Camp, Delaware, and then flows south to join Gravelly Branch about 1.5 miles northeast of Coverdale Crossroads.

== Watershed ==
Smith-Short and Willin Ditch drains 2.45 square miles (6.3 km^{2}) of area, receives about 45.1 in/year of precipitation, has a wetness index of 705.08, and is about 17% forested.

== See also ==
- List of rivers of Delaware
