= Becky Taylor Branch =

Stream in Maryland, USA

Becky Taylor Branch Tributary to Marshyhope Creek
- Location of Becky Taylor Branch mouth Becky Taylor Branch (the United States)

Location
- Country: United States
- State: Maryland
- County: Dorchester

Physical characteristics
- Source: Gales Creek divide
  - location: about 2 miles northeast of Eldorado, Maryland
  - coordinates: 38°35′31.60″N 075°45′36.00″W
  - elevation: 37 ft (11 m)
- Mouth: Marshyhope Creek
  - location: about 1 mile southeast of Eldorado, Maryland
  - coordinates: 38°34′7.42″N 075°46′42.76″W
  - elevation: 0 ft (0 m)
- Length: 2.35 mi (3.78 km)
- Basin size: 2.44 square miles (6.3 km^{2})
- Discharge
  - location: Marshyhope Creek
  - average: 2.73 cu ft/s (0.077 m^{3}/s) at mouth with Marshyhope Creek

Basin features
- Progression: Marshyhope Creek → Nanticoke River → Chesapeake Bay → Atlantic Ocean
- River system: Nanticoke River
- Tributaries
  - left: unnamed tributaries
  - right: unnamed tributaries
- Bridges: Contrary Road, Eldorado-Sharptown Road

Becky Taylor Branch is a 2.35 mi (3.78 km) long first-order tributary to Marshyhope Creek in Dorchester County, Maryland.

== Course ==
Becky Taylor Branch rises about 2 miles northeast of Eldorado, Maryland and then flows southwest to join Marshyhope Creek about 1 mile southeast of Eldorado, Maryland.

== Watershed ==
Becky Taylor Branch drains 2.44 square miles (6.3 km^{2}) of area, receives about 44.3 in/year of precipitation, and is about 14.74% forested.

== See also ==
- List of Maryland rivers
- List of rivers of the United States
