= Tussocky Branch (Gravelly Branch tributary) =

Stream in Delaware, USA

Tussocky Branch Tributary to Gravelly Branch
- Location of Tussocky Branch mouth Tussocky Branch (Gravelly Branch tributary) (the United States)

Location
- Country: United States
- State: Delaware
- County: Sussex

Physical characteristics
- Source: Gully Camp Ditch divide
  - location: about 1 mile east of Gully Camp, Delaware
  - coordinates: 38°44′27″N 075°31′08″W
  - elevation: 40 ft (12 m)
- Mouth: Gravelly Branch
  - location: about 0.25 miles east of Coverdale Crossroads, Delaware
  - coordinates: 38°42′58″N 075°31′30″W
  - elevation: 29 ft (8.8 m)
- Length: 2.55 mi (4.10 km)
- Basin size: 2.37 square miles (6.1 km^{2})
- Discharge
  - location: Gravelly Branch (Collins Pond)
  - average: 2.89 cu ft/s (0.082 m^{3}/s) at mouth with Gravelly Branch

Basin features
- Progression: Gravelly Branch → Nanticoke River → Chesapeake Bay → Atlantic Ocean
- River system: Nanticoke River
- Tributaries
  - left: unnamed tributaries
  - right: unnamed tributaries
- Waterbodies: Collins Pond
- Bridges: Chaplins Chapel Road, Russell Road

Tussocky Branch is a 2.55 mi (4.10 km) long 1st order tributary to Gravelly Branch in Sussex County, Delaware.

== Course ==
Tussocky Branch rises on the Gully Camp Ditch divide about 1 mile east of Gully Camp, Delaware, and then flows south to join Gravelly Branch about 0.25 miles east of Coverdale Crossroads.

== Watershed ==
Tussocky Branch drains 2.37 square miles (6.1 km^{2}) of area, receives about 45.0 in/year of precipitation, has a wetness index of 718.06, and is about 16% forested.

== See also ==
- List of rivers of Delaware
