= Wrights Branch (Marshyhope Creek tributary) =

Stream in Maryland, USA

Wrights Branch Tributary to Marshyhope Creek
- Location of Wrights Branch mouth Wrights Branch (Marshyhope Creek tributary) (the United States)

Location
- Country: United States
- State: Maryland
- County: Dorchester
- Town: Hurlock

Physical characteristics
- Source: Cabin Creek divide
  - location: Hurlock, Maryland
  - coordinates: 38°38′23.42″N 075°51′25.77″W
  - elevation: 40 ft (12 m)
- Mouth: Marshyhope Creek
  - location: about 2 miles southeast of Hurlock, Maryland
  - coordinates: 38°36′37.42″N 075°49′27.76″W
  - elevation: 0 ft (0 m)
- Length: 2.67 mi (4.30 km)
- Basin size: 2.89 square miles (7.5 km^{2})
- Discharge
  - location: Marshyhope Creek
  - average: 3.24 cu ft/s (0.092 m^{3}/s) at mouth with Marshyhope Creek

Basin features
- Progression: Marshyhope Creek → Nanticoke River → Chesapeake Bay → Atlantic Ocean
- River system: Nanticoke River
- Tributaries
  - left: unnamed tributaries
  - right: unnamed tributaries
- Bridges: Nealson Street, Delaware Avenue, Travers Avenue, Skeet Club Road, Palmer Mill Road

Wrights Branch is a 2.67 mi (4.30 km) long first-order tributary to Marshyhope Creek in Dorchester County, Maryland.

== Course ==
Wright Branch rises in Hurlock, Maryland and then flows southeast to join Marshyhope Creek about 2 miles (3.2 km) southeast of Hurlock, Maryland.

== Watershed ==
Wrights Branch drains 2.89 square miles (7.5 km^{2}) of area, receives about 44.4 in/year of precipitation and is about 2.70% forested.

== See also ==
- List of Maryland rivers
- List of rivers of the United States
