= Mill Branch (Marshyhope Creek tributary) =

Stream in Maryland, USA

Mill Branch Tributary to Marshyhope Creek
- Location of Mill Branch mouth Mill Branch (Marshyhope Creek tributary) (the United States)

Location
- Country: United States
- State: Maryland
- County: Dorchester

Physical characteristics
- Source: Giles Creek divide
  - location: about 3 miles northeast of Eldorado, Maryland
  - coordinates: 38°37′2.00″N 075°45′38.00″W
  - elevation: 0 ft (0 m)
- Mouth: Marshyhope Creek
  - location: Eldorado, Maryland
  - coordinates: 38°34′52.42″N 075°47′44.76″W
  - elevation: 0 ft (0 m)
- Length: 4.42 mi (7.11 km)
- Basin size: 3.25 square miles (8.4 km^{2})
- Discharge
  - location: Marshyhope Creek
  - average: 3.64 cu ft/s (0.103 m^{3}/s) at mouth with Marshyhope Creek

Basin features
- Progression: Marshyhope Creek → Nanticoke River → Chesapeake Bay → Atlantic Ocean
- River system: Nanticoke River
- Tributaries
  - left: unnamed tributaries
  - right: unnamed tributaries
- Bridges: Eldorado-Federalsburg Road, Puckum Road

Mill Branch is a 4.42 mi (7.11 km) long second-order tributary to Marshyhope Creek in Dorchester County, Maryland.

== Course ==
Mill Branch rises about 3 miles (4.8 km) northeast of Eldorado, Maryland and then flows southwest to join Marshyhope Creek at Eldorado, Maryland.

== Watershed ==
Mill Branch drains 3.25 square miles (8.4 km^{2}) of area, receives about 44.3 in/year of precipitation and is about 18.57% forested.

== See also ==
- List of Maryland rivers
- List of rivers of the United States
