= Puckum Branch =

Stream in Maryland, USA

Puckum Branch Tributary to Marshyhope Creek
- Location of Puckum Branch mouth Puckum Branch (the United States)

Location
- Country: United States
- State: Maryland
- County: Dorchester

Physical characteristics
- Source: Gales Creek divide
  - location: about 4 miles northeast of Eldorado, Maryland
  - coordinates: 38°37′9.00″N 075°45′46.00″W
  - elevation: 40 ft (12 m)
- Mouth: Marshyhope Creek
  - location: about 1 mile east of Ennalls, Maryland
  - coordinates: 38°36′7.42″N 075°49′11.76″W
  - elevation: 0 ft (0 m)
- Length: 3.99 mi (6.42 km)
- Basin size: 3.58 square miles (9.3 km^{2})
- Discharge
  - location: Marshyhope Creek
  - average: 4.04 cu ft/s (0.114 m^{3}/s) at mouth with Marshyhope Creek

Basin features
- Progression: Marshyhope Creek → Nanticoke River → Chesapeake Bay → Atlantic Ocean
- River system: Nanticoke River
- Tributaries
  - left: unnamed tributaries
  - right: unnamed tributaries
- Bridges: Eldorado-Federalsburg Road, Puckum Road

Puckum Branch is a 3.99 mi (6.42 km) long second-order tributary to Marshyhope Creek in Dorchester County, Maryland. This is the only stream of this name in the United States.

== Course ==
Puckum Branch rises about 4 miles (6.4 km) northeast of Eldorado, Maryland and then flows west-southwest to join Marshyhope Creek about 1 mile east of Ennalls, Maryland.

== Watershed ==
Puckum Branch drains 3.58 square miles (9.3 km^{2}) of area, receives about 44.4 in/year of precipitation and is about 22.74% forested.

== See also ==
- List of Maryland rivers
- List of rivers of the United States
