= Beaverdam Branch (Marshyhope Creek tributary) =

Stream in Delaware, USA

Beaverdam Branch Tributary to Marshyhope Creek
- Location of Beaverdam Branch mouth Beaverdam Branch (Marshyhope Creek tributary) (the United States)

Location
- Country: United States
- State: Delaware
- County: Kent

Physical characteristics
- Source: Price Prong divide
  - location: about 1-mile east-southeast of Brownsville, Delaware
  - coordinates: 38°56′6.00″N 075°40′15.00″W
  - elevation: 60 ft (18 m)
- Mouth: Marshyhope Creek
  - location: McKnatts Corner, Delaware
  - coordinates: 38°54′22.41″N 075°38′46.74″W
  - elevation: 43 ft (13 m)
- Length: 2.89 mi (4.65 km)
- Basin size: 2.69 square miles (7.0 km^{2})
- Discharge
  - location: Marshyhope Creek
  - average: 3.26 cu ft/s (0.092 m^{3}/s) at mouth with Marshyhope Creek

Basin features
- Progression: Marshyhope Creek → Nanticoke River → Chesapeake Bay → Atlantic Ocean
- River system: Nanticoke River
- Tributaries
  - left: unnamed tributaries
  - right: unnamed tributaries
- Bridges: Whiteleysburg Road, Fox Hunters Road

Beaverdam Branch is a 2.89 mi (4.65 km) long first-order tributary to Marshyhope Creek in Kent County, Delaware.

== Course ==
Beaverdam Branch rises on the Price Prong divide about 1-mile east-southeast of Brownsville, Delaware, and then flows generally southeast to join Marshyhope Creek at McKnatts Corner, Delaware.

== Watershed ==
Beaverdam Branch drains 2.69 square miles (7.0 km^{2}) of area, receives about 44.8 in/year of precipitation, and is about 8.42% forested.

== See also ==
- List of rivers of Delaware
