= Houston Branch (Marshyhope Creek tributary) =

Stream in Delaware, USA

Houston Branch Tributary to Marshyhope Creek
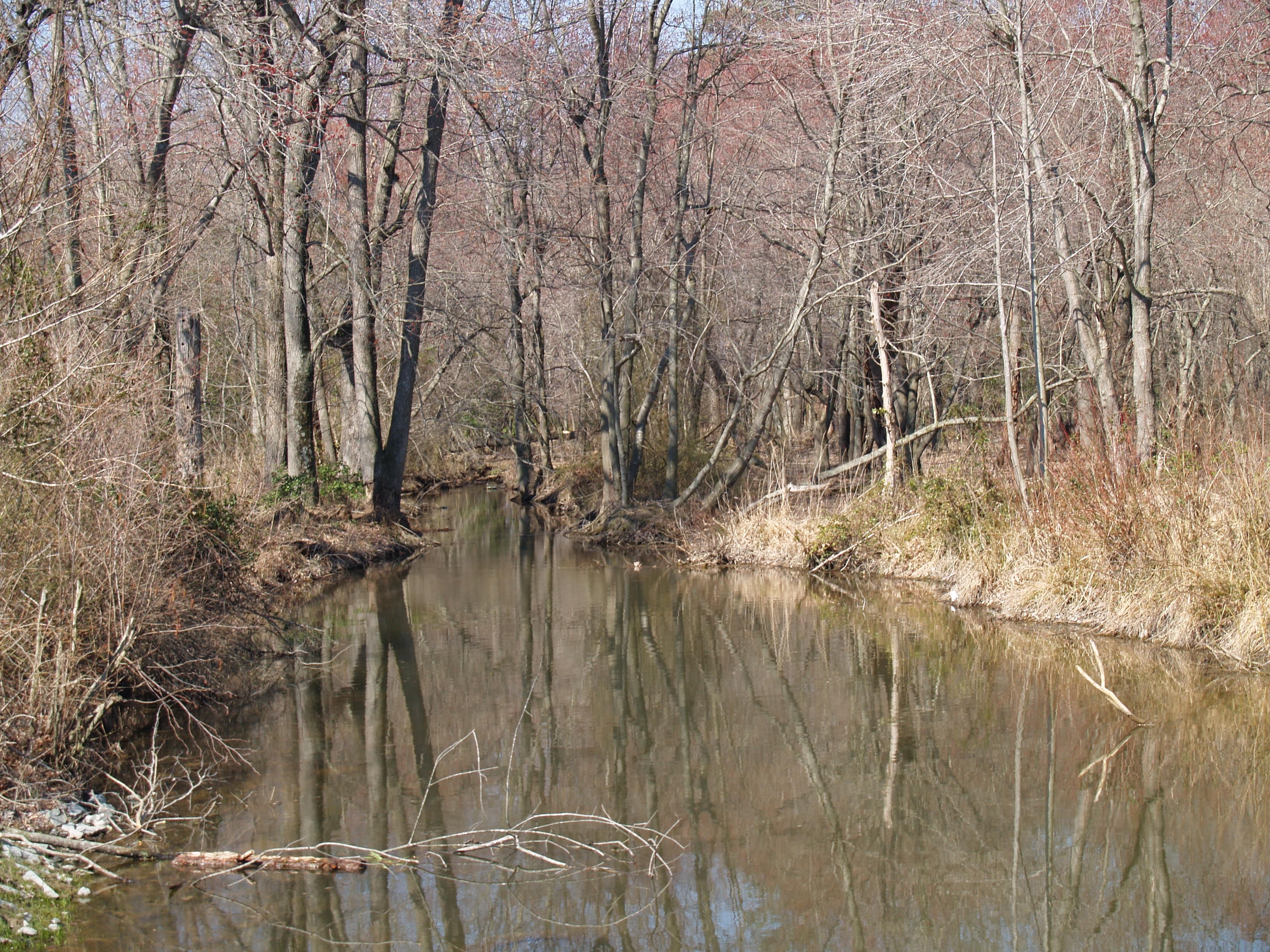
- Houston Branch looking downstream towards Delaware Stateline from Handy Road

- Location of Houston Branch mouth Houston Branch (Marshyhope Creek tributary) (the United States)

Location
- Country: United States
- State: Maryland; Delaware
- Counties: Caroline; Sussex

Physical characteristics
- Source: divide between Houston Branch and Clear Brook (Nanticoke River)
  - location: about 1 mile west of Atlanta, Delaware
  - coordinates: 38°42′27″N 075°41′07″W
  - elevation: 40 ft (12 m)
- Mouth: Marshyhope Creek
  - location: about 3 miles northeast of Nichols, Maryland
  - coordinates: 38°44′32″N 075°45′08″W
  - elevation: 10 ft (3.0 m)
- Length: 6.47 mi (10.41 km)
- Basin size: 10.26 square miles (26.6 km^{2})
- Discharge
  - location: Marshyhope Creek
  - average: 12.12 cu ft/s (0.343 m^{3}/s) at mouth with Marshyhope Creek

Basin features
- Progression: Marshyhope Creek → Nanticoke River → Chesapeake Bay → Atlantic Ocean
- River system: Nanticoke River
- Tributaries
  - left: unnamed tributaries
  - right: Brights Branch

Houston Branch is a 10.26 mi (16.51 km) long tributary to Marshyhope Creek that rises in western Sussex County, Delaware and flows west into Caroline County, Maryland.

== See also ==
- List of Delaware rivers
- List of rivers of Maryland
