= Jones Branch (Marshyhope Creek tributary) =

Stream in Delaware, USA

Jones Branch Tributary to Marshyhope Creek
- Location of Jones Branch mouth Jones Branch (Marshyhope Creek tributary) (the United States)

Location
- Country: United States
- State: Delaware
- County: Sussex

Physical characteristics
- Source: Bridgeville Branch divide
  - location: Jacobs Crossroads, Delaware
  - coordinates: 38°44′58.41″N 075°41′16.75″W
  - elevation: 48 ft (15 m)
- Mouth: Marshyhope Creek
  - location: about 1 mile east of Smithville, Maryland
  - coordinates: 38°46′5.41″N 075°42′51.75″W
  - elevation: 20 ft (6.1 m)
- Length: 2.39 mi (3.85 km)
- Basin size: 2.20 square miles (5.7 km^{2})
- Discharge
  - location: Marshyhope Creek
  - average: 1.90 cu ft/s (0.054 m^{3}/s) at mouth with Marshyhope Creek

Basin features
- Progression: Marshyhope Creek → Nanticoke River → Chesapeake Bay → Atlantic Ocean
- River system: Nanticoke River
- Tributaries
  - left: unnamed tributaries
  - right: unnamed tributaries
- Bridges: Atlanta Road (x2), Sand Hill Road

Jones Branch is a 2.39 mi (3.85 km) long first-order tributary to Marshyhope Creek in Sussex County, Delaware.

== Course ==
Jones Branch rises on the Bridgeville Branch divide at Jacobs Crossroads, Delaware, and then flows generally northwest to join Marshyhope Creek about 1-mile east of Smithville, Maryland.

== Watershed ==
Jones Branch drains 2.20 square miles (5.7 km^{2}) of area, receives about 44.7 in/year of precipitation, and is about 26.06% forested.

== See also ==
- List of rivers of Delaware
