= Stony Bar Creek =

Stream in Maryland, USA

Stony Bar Creek Tributary to Marshyhope Creek
- Location of Stony Bar Creek mouth Stony Bar Creek (the United States)

Location
- Country: United States
- State: Maryland
- County: Dorchester

Physical characteristics
- Source: Chicone Creek divide
  - location: about 2 miles northeast of Reids Grove, Maryland
  - coordinates: 38°32′32.00″N 075°47′56.00″W
  - elevation: 0 ft (0 m)
- Mouth: Marshyhope Creek
  - location: about 0.25 miles northeast of Walnut Landing, Maryland
  - coordinates: 38°32′8.42″N 075°45′51.76″W
  - elevation: 0 ft (0 m)
- Length: 1.29 mi (2.08 km)
- Basin size: 0.94 square miles (2.4 km^{2})
- Discharge
  - location: Marshyhope Creek
  - average: 1.01 cu ft/s (0.029 m^{3}/s) at mouth with Marshyhope Creek

Basin features
- Progression: Marshyhope Creek → Nanticoke River → Chesapeake Bay → Atlantic Ocean
- River system: Nanticoke River
- Tributaries
  - left: unnamed tributaries
  - right: unnamed tributaries
- Bridges: Indian Town Road, Walnut Landing Road

Stony Bar Creek is a 1.29 mi (2.08 km) long first-order tributary to Marshyhope Creek in Dorchester County, Maryland. This is the only stream of this name in the United States.

== Variant names ==
According to the Geographic Names Information System, it has also been known historically as:

- Little Indian Creek

== Course ==
Stony Bar Creek rises about 2 miles (3.2 km) northeast of Reids Grove, Maryland and then flows east-southeast to join Marshyhope Creek about 0.25 miles (0.40 km) northeast of Walnut Landing, Maryland.

== Watershed ==
Stony Bar Creek drains 0.94 square miles (2.4 km^{2}) of area, receives about 44.0 in/year of precipitation and is about 17.85% forested.

== See also ==
- List of Maryland rivers
