= Maryland Route 318 =

Highway in Maryland

Maryland Route 318
- Maryland Route 318 highlighted in red

Route information
- Maintained by MDSHA
- Length: 11.32 mi (18.22 km)
- Existed: 1927–present
- Tourist routes: Chesapeake Country Scenic Byway

Major junctions
- West end: MD 16 / MD 331 at Linchester
- MD 313 / MD 315 in Federalsburg; MD 307 in Federalsburg; MD 313 in Federalsburg; MD 315 in Federalsburg
- East end: DE 18 near Federalsburg

Location
- Country: United States
- State: Maryland
- Counties: Dorchester, Caroline

Highway system
- Maryland highway system; Interstate; US; State; Scenic Byways
← MD 317	→ MD 320

Maryland Route 318 (MD 318) is a state highway in the U.S. state of Maryland. The state highway runs 11.32 miles (18.22 km) from MD 16/MD 331 at Linchester east to the Delaware state line near Federalsburg, where the highway continues east as Delaware Route 18 (DE 18). MD 318 connects Federalsburg with Preston and Bridgeville, Delaware. The state highway follows the Dorchester–Caroline county line for most of its length between Linchester and Federalsburg. The county line road is considered to be in Caroline County for maintenance purposes. Further east, MD 318 runs concurrently with MD 313 to bypass Federalsburg. The portion of MD 318 west of Federalsburg was originally numbered Maryland Route 319 and assumed by MD 318 in the mid-1950s. The MD 319 section was constructed in the late 1910s near Federalsburg and completed west to MD 16/MD 331 in the late 1920s. MD 318 east of Federalsburg was built in the mid-1920s. MD 318 was placed on the bypass of Federalsburg in the early 1960s; its old alignment through Federalsburg became MD 315.

== Route description ==
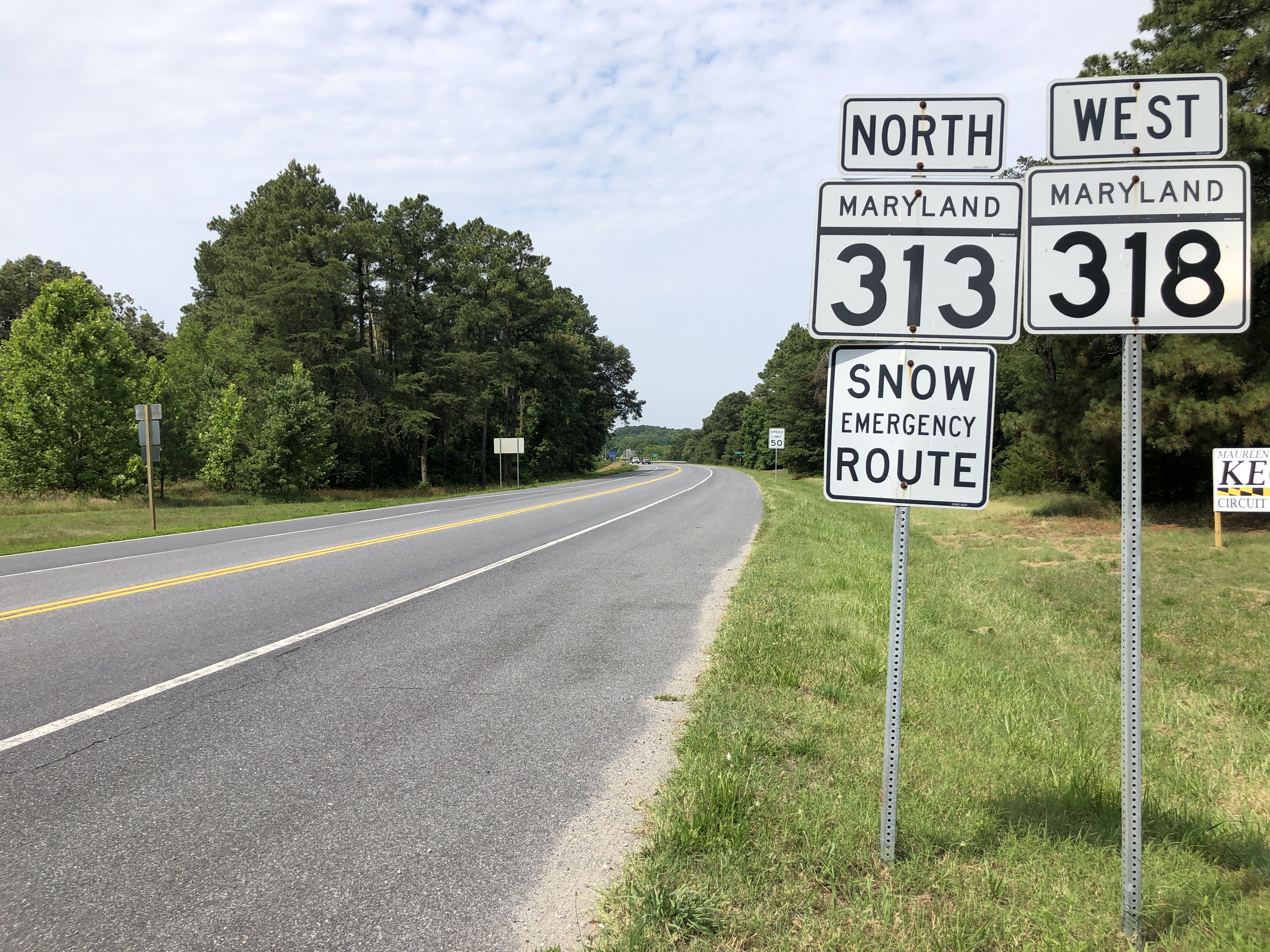
MD 318 westbound concurrent with MD 313 northbound on the bypass of Federalsburg

MD 318 begins at an intersection with MD 16/MD 331 at Linchester, just south of the Caroline–Dorchester county line. MD 16/MD 331 head south from the intersection as East New Market Ellwood Road and west as a continuation of Preston Road toward the town of Preston. MD 318 heads east as Preston Road, a two-lane undivided road that intersects Langrell Road and Beulah Road a short distance east of its western terminus. Langrell Road is unsigned MD 817B, which follows the county line west to a dead end at Hunting Creek. MD 318 continues east along the county line through farmland between Dorchester County to the south and Caroline County to the north. The state highway intersects American Corner Road and passes Magennis Farm Airport in the hamlet of Hynson. MD 318 fully enters Caroline County shortly after passing Lovers Road, then intersects MD 313 (Federalsburg Highway) and MD 315 (Bloomingdale Avenue). MD 315, the old alignment of MD 318, continues straight east toward downtown Federalsburg, while MD 318 turns south and runs concurrently with MD 313 on a bypass of the town of Federalsburg.

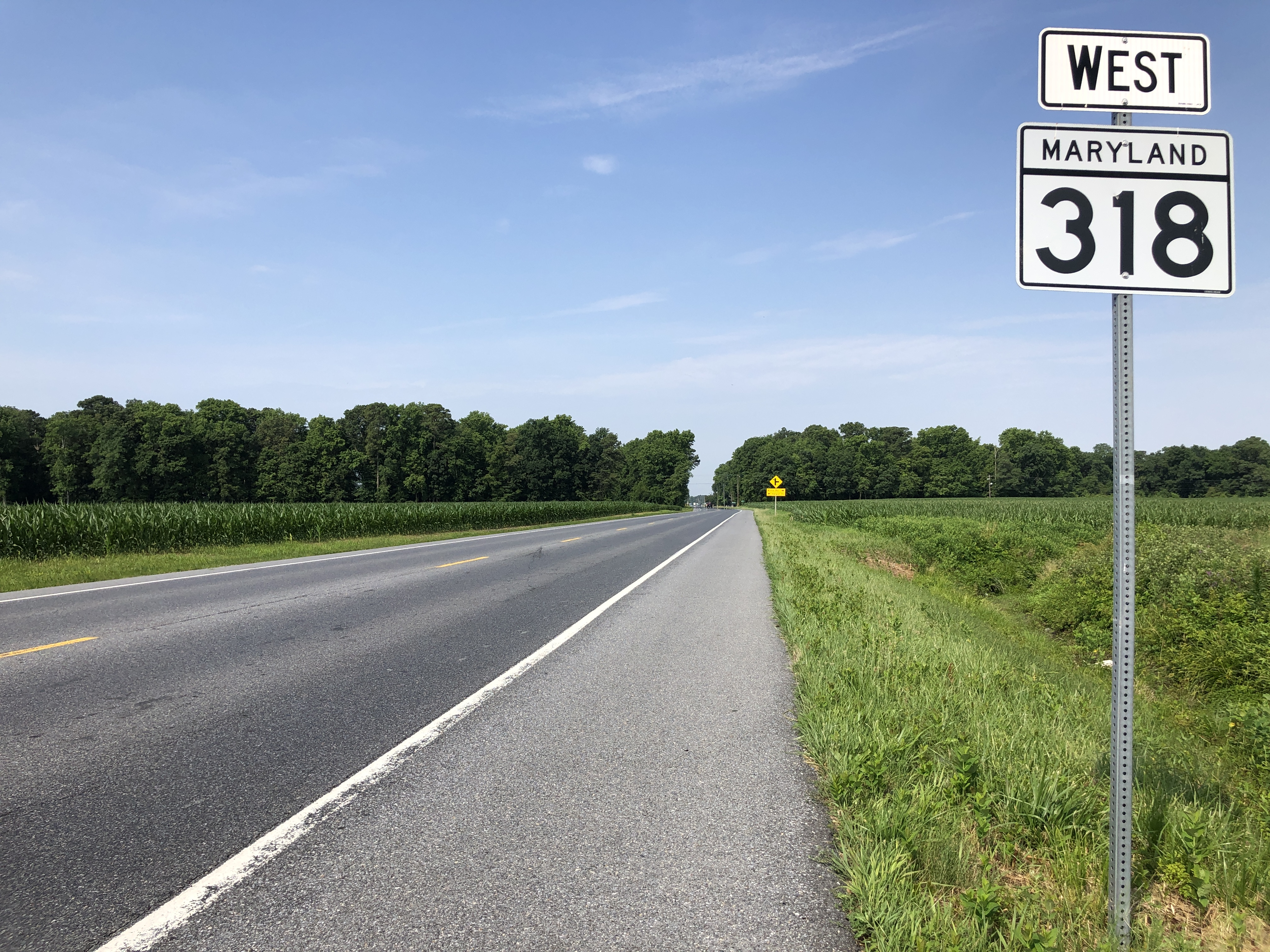
View west along MD 318 past the Delaware state line near Federalsburg

MD 313/MD 318 intersect MD 307 (Williamsburg Road) at the Federalsburg Roundabout. The highway crosses the Seaford Line of the Maryland and Delaware Railroad at-grade as the highway gently curves to the east. After passing Main Street, which is unsigned MD 308, MD 313/MD 318 cross Marshyhope Creek. East of the creek, MD 313 turns south onto Reliance Road; the old alignment of MD 313 heads north toward downtown Federalsburg as Reliance Avenue. MD 318 continues east through an industrial area along Federalsburg Highway, which crosses the Seaford Line track again at-grade. The state highway crosses Tanyard Branch before meeting the other end of MD 315 (Liberty Road). MD 318 continues east as Bridgeville Road to the Delaware state line, where the highway heads toward the town of Bridgeville as DE 18 (Federalsburg Road).

== History ==
Maryland Route 319
- Location: Linchester–Federalsburg
- Existed: 1927–1956

The portion of MD 318 between Linchester and Federalsburg was originally MD 319, which was constructed as a state-aid road from Federalsburg to about halfway to Hynson around 1919. The state highway was completed west to U.S. Route 213 (now MD 331)/MD 16 near Preston by 1930. MD 318 from Federalsburg to the Delaware state line was built between 1924 and 1926. MD 318 was extended west through Federalsburg and over the whole length of MD 319 in 1956. The state highway west of Federalsburg was widened around 1958 and extended west fully into Dorchester County to its present terminus when MD 16/MD 331 were relocated around Ellwood in 1960. MD 318 was placed on the Federalsburg Bypass when the highway was extended south and east around the town to the present intersection with MD 315 in 1964; MD 318 through the town was renumbered MD 315. The Federalsburg Roundabout was constructed in 1998. The Federalsburg Bypass bridge over Marshyhope Creek, which was originally built in 1962, was rehabilitated in 2012. During the project, which replaced the bridge's deck, alternating one-way traffic crossed the bridge directed by traffic lights at either end of the construction area.

== Junction list ==
MD 318 follows the Caroline–Dorchester county line between the intersection with MD 817 near Preston and a point between Lovers Road and MD 313 near Federalsburg. The county line portion is considered to be in Caroline County for maintenance purposes.

County	Location	mi	km	Destinations	Notes
Dorchester	Linchester	0.00	0.00	MD 16 / MD 331 (Preston Road/East New Market Ellwood Road) – Preston, Easton, Hurlock	Western terminus
Dorchester	Linchester	0.37	0.60	Langrell Road north / Beulah Road south	Langrell Road is unsigned MD 817B
Caroline	Federalsburg	6.05	9.74	MD 313 north (Federalsburg Highway) / MD 315 east (Bloomingdale Avenue) – Denton, Federalsburg	West end of concurrency with MD 313; western terminus of MD 315; MD 315 is the old alignment of MD 318
Caroline	Federalsburg	6.51	10.48	MD 307 (Williamsburg Road) – Federalsburg, Hurlock	Federalsburg Roundabout
Caroline	Federalsburg	7.73	12.44	MD 308 north (Main Street) / Veterans Drive south – Federalsburg	Southern terminus of MD 308; MD 308 is unsigned
Caroline	Federalsburg	8.24	13.26	MD 313 south (Reliance Road) / Reliance Avenue north – Eldorado	East end of concurrency with MD 313; Reliance Avenue is old alignment of MD 313
Caroline		9.91	15.95	MD 315 north (Liberty Road)	Eastern terminus of MD 315; Old alignment of MD 318
Caroline		11.32	18.22	DE 18 east (Federalsburg Road) – Bridgeville	Delaware state line; eastern terminus
1.000 mi = 1.609 km; 1.000 km = 0.621 mi: Concurrency terminus
