= Spears Creek (Marshyhope Creek tributary) =

Stream in Maryland, USA

Spears Creek Tributary to Marshyhope Creek
- Location of Spears Creek mouth Spears Creek (Marshyhope Creek tributary) (the United States)

Location
- Country: United States
- State: Maryland
- County: Dorchester

Physical characteristics
- Source: Chicone Creek divide
  - location: about 1 miles south of Brookview, Maryland
  - coordinates: 38°33′37.00″N 075°47′39.00″W
  - elevation: 22 ft (6.7 m)
- Mouth: Marshyhope Creek
  - location: about 0.25 miles southeast of Brookview, Maryland
  - coordinates: 38°34′9.42″N 075°46′47.76″W
  - elevation: 0 ft (0 m)
- Length: 1.03 mi (1.66 km)
- Basin size: 1.17 square miles (3.0 km^{2})
- Discharge
  - location: Marshyhope Creek
  - average: 1.28 cu ft/s (0.036 m^{3}/s) at mouth with Marshyhope Creek

Basin features
- Progression: Marshyhope Creek → Nanticoke River → Chesapeake Bay → Atlantic Ocean
- River system: Nanticoke River
- Tributaries
  - left: unnamed tributaries
  - right: unnamed tributaries
- Bridges: Indian Town Road

Spears Creek is a 1.03 mi (1.66 km) long first-order tributary to Marshyhope Creek in Dorchester County, Maryland.

== Course ==
Spears Creek rises about 1 mile (1.6 km) south of Brookview, Maryland and then flows northeast to join Marshyhope Creek about 0.25 miles (0.40 km) southeast of Brookview, Maryland.

== Watershed ==
Spears Creek drains 1.17 square miles (3.0 km^{2}) of area, receives about 44.1 in/year of precipitation, and is about 21.26% forested.

== See also ==
- List of Maryland rivers
