= Booth Branch (White Marsh Branch tributary) =

Stream in Delaware, USA

Booth Branch Tributary to White Marsh Branch
- Location of Booth Branch mouth Booth Branch (White Marsh Branch tributary) (the United States)

Location
- Country: United States
- State: Delaware
- County: Kent

Physical characteristics
- Source: Tomahawk Branch divide
  - location: about 1.5 miles northwest of Greenwood, Delaware
  - coordinates: 38°51′08″N 075°36′45″W
  - elevation: 60 ft (18 m)
- Mouth: White Marsh Branch
  - location: about 1 mile north of Greenwood, Delaware
  - coordinates: 38°50′14″N 075°34′43″W
  - elevation: 46 ft (14 m)
- Length: 2.48 mi (3.99 km)
- Basin size: 1.01 square miles (2.6 km^{2})
- Discharge
  - location: White Marsh Branch
  - average: 1.27 cu ft/s (0.036 m^{3}/s) at mouth with Nanticoke River

Basin features
- Progression: White Marsh Branch → Nanticoke River → Chesapeake Bay → Atlantic Ocean
- River system: Nanticoke River
- Tributaries
  - left: unnamed tributaries
  - right: unnamed tributaries
- Bridges: Booth Branch Lane, Nine Foot Road, US 13

Booth Branch is a 2.40 mi (3.86 km) long 1st order tributary to White Marsh Branch in Kent County, Delaware.

== Course ==
Booth Branch rises about 1.5 miles northwest of Greenwood, Delaware in Kent County and then flows southeast to join White Marsh Branch about 1 mile north of Greenwood.

== Watershed ==
Booth Branch drains 1.01 square miles (2.6 km^{2}) of area, receives about 45.3 in/year of precipitation, has a topographic wetness index of 667.75 and is about 3% forested.

== See also ==
- List of Delaware rivers
