= Big Creek (Marshyhope Creek tributary) =

Stream in Maryland, USA

Big Creek Tributary to Marshyhope Creek
- Location of Big Creek mouth Big Creek (Marshyhope Creek tributary) (the United States)

Location
- Country: United States
- State: Maryland
- County: Dorchester

Physical characteristics
- Source: This stream begins in a tidal area
  - location: about 1 mile west of Riverton, Maryland
  - coordinates: 38°30′44.00″N 075°46′43.76″W
  - elevation: 0 ft (0 m)
- Mouth: Marshyhope Creek
  - location: about 0.25 miles southeast of Walnut Landing, Maryland
  - coordinates: 38°31′35.42″N 075°45′43.36″W
  - elevation: 0 ft (0 m)
- Length: 1.45 mi (2.33 km)
- Basin size: 1.32 square miles (3.4 km^{2})
- Discharge
  - location: Marshyhope Creek
  - average: 1.41 cu ft/s (0.040 m^{3}/s) at mouth with Marshyhope Creek

Basin features
- Progression: Marshyhope Creek → Nanticoke River → Chesapeake Bay → Atlantic Ocean
- River system: Nanticoke River
- Tributaries
  - left: unnamed tributaries
  - right: unnamed tributaries
- Bridges: none

Big Creek is a 1.45 mi (2.33 km) long first-order tributary to Marshyhope Creek in Dorchester County, Maryland.

== Course ==
Big Creek rises about 1 mile (1.6 km) west of Riverton, Maryland in a tidal marsh and then flows northeast to join Marshyhope Creek about 0.25 miles (0.40 km) southeast of Walnut Landing, Maryland.

== Watershed ==
Big Creek drains 1.32 square miles (3.4 km^{2}) of area, receives about 43.9 in/year of precipitation, and is about 13.51% forested.

== See also ==
- List of Maryland rivers
