= Maryland Route 307 =

State highway in Maryland, United States

Maryland Route 307
- Maryland Route 307 highlighted in red

Route information
- Maintained by MDSHA
- Length: 6.05 mi (9.74 km)
- Existed: 1927–present

Major junctions
- South end: MD 331 in Hurlock
- MD 313 / MD 318 in Federalsburg
- North end: Academy Avenue in Federalsburg

Location
- Country: United States
- State: Maryland
- Counties: Dorchester, Caroline

Highway system
- Maryland highway system; Interstate; US; State; Scenic Byways
← MD 306	→ MD 308

Maryland Route 307 (MD 307) is a state highway in the U.S. state of Maryland. Known for most of its length as Williamsburg Road, the state highway runs 6.05 miles (9.74 km) from MD 331 in Hurlock north to the end of state maintenance at Charles Street a short distance east of the intersection with MD 313/MD 318 in Federalsburg. MD 307 was one of the first highways completed by the Maryland State Roads Commission when the Hurlock–Federalsburg Road was constructed in 1910. The highway was relocated between Williamsburg and Federalsburg in the 1960s.

== Route description ==
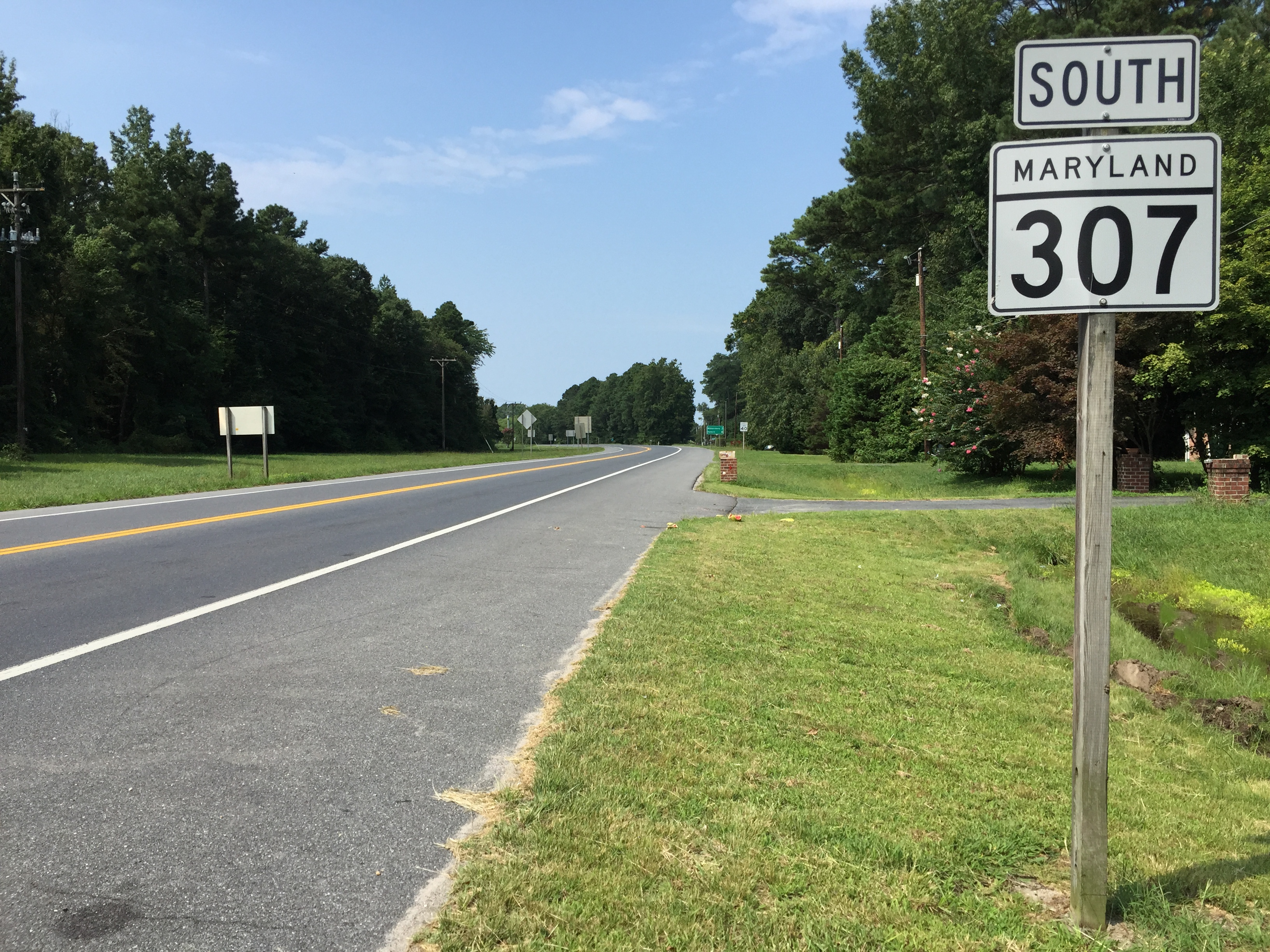
View south along MD 307 at MD 313/MD 318 near Federalsburg

MD 307 begins at a five-way intersection in the town of Hurlock in Dorchester County. Oak Street is the west leg of the intersection, while Main Street, which is MD 331 to the south, forms the north and south legs of the intersection. MD 331 heads northwest on Academy Street. MD 307 heads east as two-lane undivided Broad Street through an industrial area after a grade crossing with a spur of the Seaford Line of the Maryland and Delaware Railroad, which the state highway begins to parallel closely to the northwest as it leaves Hurlock. MD 307 continues northeast as Williamsburg Road through farmland. The state highway passes through the hamlet of Williamsburg and traverses Skinners Run before leaving the vicinity of the railroad. MD 307 enters Caroline County shortly before meeting MD 313/MD 318 (Federalsburg Highway) at the four-leg Federalsburg Roundabout. MD 307 continues east into the town of Federalsburg and reaches its eastern terminus at Charles Street. Academy Avenue continues east as a municipal street toward Main Street in downtown Federalsburg.

== History ==
The segment of MD 307 between the town limits of Federalsburg and the Dorchester County line was the first section of state road placed under contract for construction by the Maryland State Roads Commission in June 1909. That section of road and the remainder of the highway southwest to Hurlock were completed in 1910. The portion of original highway between Williamsburg and just west of Federalsburg was bypassed in 1970; the old alignment is now Whitely Road. The Federalsburg Roundabout was constructed in 1998.

== Junction list ==
County	Location	mi	km	Destinations	Notes
Dorchester	Hurlock	0.00	0.00	MD 331 (Main Street/Academy Street) – Preston, Vienna	Southern terminus
Caroline	Federalsburg	5.65	9.09	MD 313 / MD 318 (Federalsburg Highway) – Denton, Eldorado	Federalsburg Roundabout
Caroline	Federalsburg	6.05	9.74	Academy Avenue east / Charles Street	Northern terminus
1.000 mi = 1.609 km; 1.000 km = 0.621 mi
