= Exeter (Federalsburg, Maryland) =

Historic house in Maryland, United States

- U.S. National Register of Historic Places
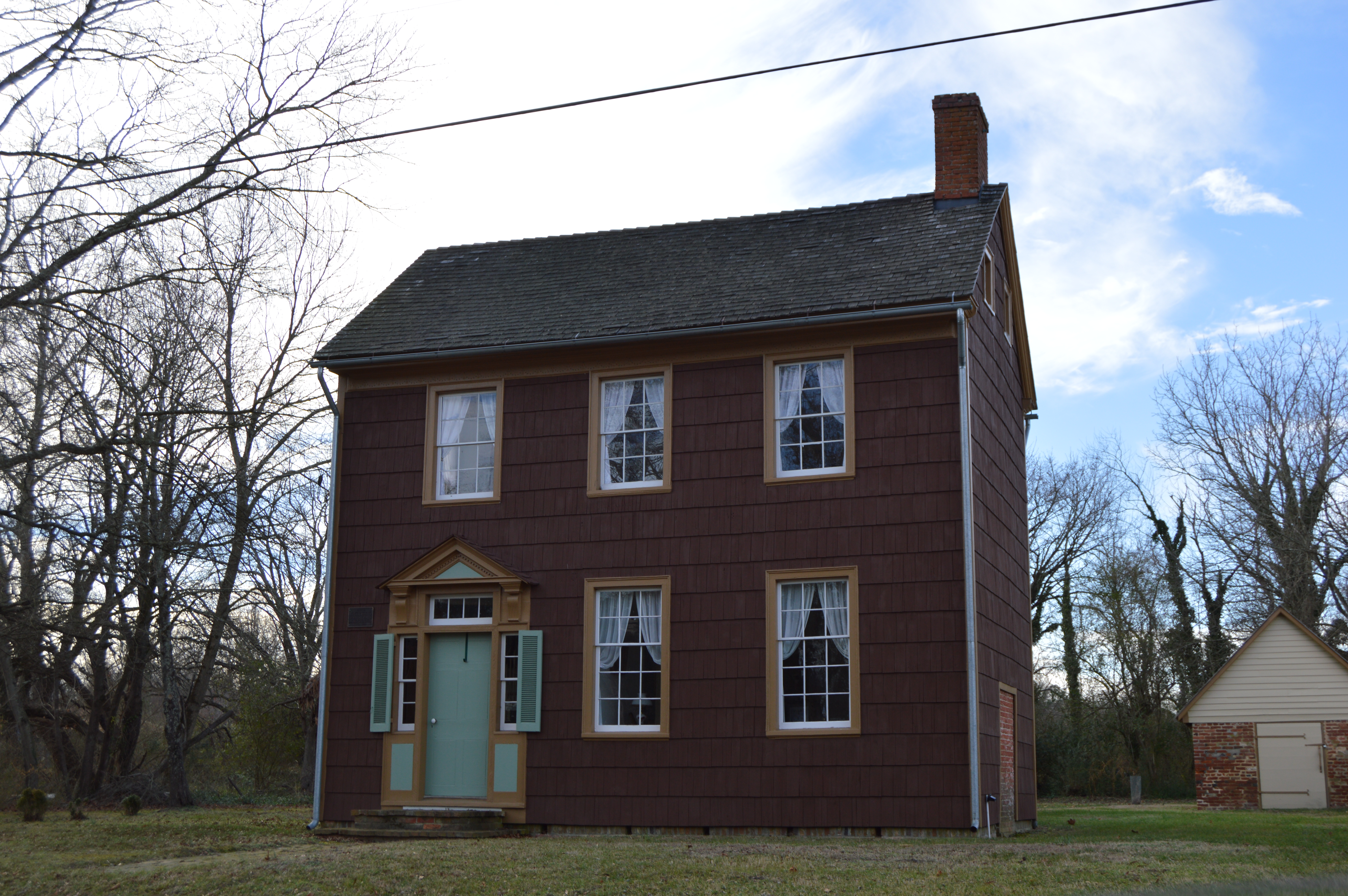
- Front of the house

- Location within Maryland Location within the United States
- Location: North of Federalsburg on Maryland Route 630, Federalsburg, Maryland
- Coordinates: 38°42′10″N 75°46′37″W
- Area: Less than 1 acre (0.40 ha)
- NRHP reference No.: 78001448
- Added to NRHP: January 3, 1978

Exeter is a historic home located at Federalsburg, Caroline County, Maryland, United States. It is probably the earliest home built near Federalsburg in the early 1800s.. It is composed of two distinct sections constructed during the 19th century. The front section is a three-bay wide, two-story frame structure covered with cypress shingles. Behind it is a 1 1/2-story frame wing, four bays long, covered with beaded weatherboard. Outbuildings include a brick meathouse and frame milkhouse.

It was listed on the National Register of Historic Places in 1978.
