= Gravelly Branch (Nanticoke River tributary) =

Stream in Delaware, USA

Gravelly Branch Tributary to Nanticoke River
- Location of Gravelly Branch mouth Gravelly Branch (Nanticoke River tributary) (the United States)

Location
- Country: United States
- State: Delaware
- County: Sussex

Physical characteristics
- Source: Ellendale Swamp on Sowbridge Branch divide
  - location: about 1 mile south-southeast of Ellendale, Delaware
  - coordinates: 38°48′20″N 075°24′35″W
  - elevation: 45 ft (14 m)
- Mouth: Nanticoke River
  - location: about 2 miles northeast of Middleford, Delaware
  - coordinates: 38°41′11″N 075°33′21″W
  - elevation: 3 ft (0.91 m)
- Length: 13.12 mi (21.11 km)
- Basin size: 39.09 square miles (101.2 km^{2})
- Discharge
  - location: Nanticoke River
  - average: 47.77 cu ft/s (1.353 m^{3}/s) at mouth with Nanticoke River

Basin features
- Progression: Nanticoke River → Chesapeake Bay → Atlantic Ocean
- River system: Nanticoke River
- Tributaries
  - left: Gravelly Ditch
  - right: Prong Number One; Smith-Short and Willin Ditch; Tussocky Branch
- Waterbodies: Collins Pond
- Bridges: Saw Mill Road (x2), US 113, W Robbins Road, Redden Road, Deer Forest Road, DE 18-404, Coverdale Road

Gravelly Branch is a 13.12 mi (21.11 km) long 4th order tributary to the Nanticoke River in Sussex County, Delaware.

== Variant names ==
According to the Geographic Names Information System, it has also been known historically as:

- Gravel Creek
- Gravely Branch

== Course ==
Gravelly Branch rises in Ellendale Swamp on the Sowbridge Branch divide about 1 mile south-southeast of Ellendale, Delaware, and then flows southwest to join the Nanticoke River about 2 miles northeast of Middleford.

== Watershed ==
Gravelly Branch drains 39.09 square miles (101.2 km^{2}) of area, receives about 45.2 in/year of precipitation, has a wetness index of 741.95, and is about 19% forested.

== See also ==
- List of rivers of Delaware
