= Cannon, Delaware =

Unincorporated community in Delaware, United States

- Unincorporated community
- Location within Delaware Location within the United States
- Coordinates: 38°41′58″N 75°36′54″W
- Country: United States
- State: Delaware
- County: Sussex
- Elevation: 39 ft (12 m)
- Time zone: UTC-5 (Eastern (EST))
  - Summer (DST): UTC-4 (EDT)
- Area code: 302
- GNIS feature ID: 213752

Cannon is an unincorporated community in Sussex County, Delaware, United States. Cannon is located on Delaware Route 18 south of Bridgeville.

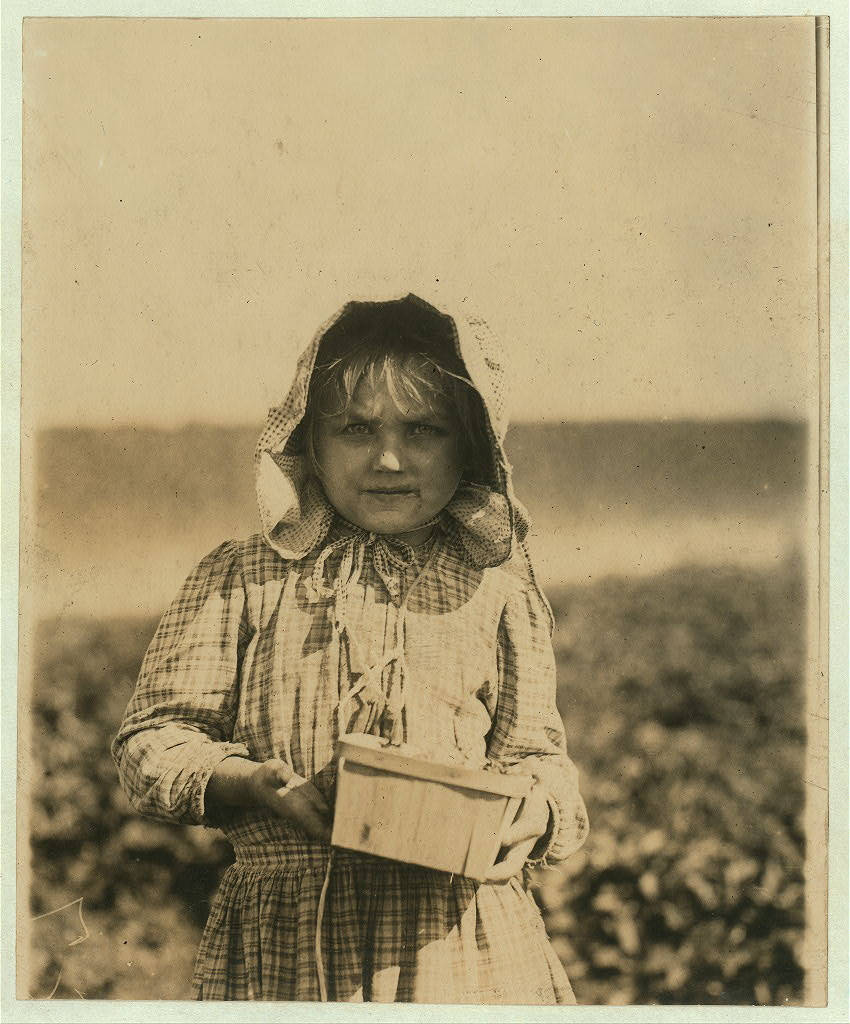
Child laborer Alberta McNadd on Chester Truitt's farm at Cannon, 1910.

== History ==
Cannon's population was 25 in 1890, 16 in 1900, and 150 in 1960.
