= White Marsh Branch (Nanticoke River tributary) =

Stream in Delaware, USA

White Marsh Branch Tributary to Nanticoke River
- Location of White Marsh Branch mouth White Marsh Branch (Nanticoke River tributary) (the United States)

Location
- Country: United States
- State: Delaware
- County: Sussex; Kent

Physical characteristics
- Source: Prong No. 2 divide
  - location: Farmington, Delaware
  - coordinates: 38°51′41″N 075°34′08″W
  - elevation: 61 ft (19 m)
- Mouth: Nanticoke River
  - location: about 0.5 miles northeast of Greenwood, Delaware
  - coordinates: 38°49′12″N 075°34′39″W
  - elevation: 43 ft (13 m)
- Length: 3.09 mi (4.97 km)
- Basin size: 5.45 square miles (14.1 km^{2})
- Discharge
  - location: Nanticoke River
  - average: 6.81 cu ft/s (0.193 m^{3}/s) at mouth with Nanticoke River

Basin features
- Progression: Nanticoke River → Chesapeake Bay → Atlantic Ocean
- River system: Nanticoke River
- Tributaries
  - left: unnamed tributaries
  - right: Booth Branch
- Bridges: Marsh Branch Road, Woodyard Road

White Marsh Branch is a 3.09 mi (4.97 km) long 2nd order tributary to the Nanticoke River in Sussex County, Delaware.

== Course ==
White Marsh Branch rises at Farmington, Delaware in Kent County and then flows south into Sussex County to join the Nanticoke River about 0.5 miles northeast of Greenwood, Delaware.

== Watershed ==
White Marsh Branch drains 5.45 square miles (14.1 km^{2}) of area, receives about 45.3 in/year of precipitation, has a topographic wetness index of 703.88 and is about 4% forested.

== See also ==
- List of Delaware rivers
