= Delmarva Chicken Festival =

The Delmarva Chicken Festival (Del-Mar-Va Chicken Festival, Delmarva Chicken Festival and National Chicken Cooking Contest) is an annual event sponsored by Delmarva Poultry Industry, Inc started in 1948 or 1949 with the purpose of publicizing the Delmarva Peninsula with an emphasis on its arguably most important agricultural enterprise, raising chickens.

The two-day event hosted in various locales on Delmarva features poultry equipment trade shows, the Miss Del-Mar-Va contest, the National Chicken Cooking Contest, a parade, arts and crafts, a carnival, entertainment, and food concessions. Chicken is the featured food, but french fries, corn-on-the-cob, funnel cake, ice cream, kettle corn, and fresh-squeezed lemonade are other local favorites. Nearly three tons of chicken are cooked each year in the world's largest frying pan. The pan made its debut at the second annual festival in 1950. The first and original pan was used and made by the Mumford Sheet Metal Company in Selbyville, Delaware, and was "given to the Delmarva Poultry Industry for use in promoting chicken produced on the Delmarva Peninsula". It was ten feet in diameter and had an eight-foot handle, was 18 inches deep, required 180 gallons of cooking oil and 150 gallons of LP gas, weighed 650 pounds, and could hold 800 chicken quarters. The 65th Annual Delmarva Chicken Festival was estimated to use four tons of chicken.

The 65th Delmarva Chicken Festival in 2014 was expected to be the final year for the festival and its Giant Fry Pan.

The Del-Mar-Va Chicken Festival took place June 13-15, 1950 in Dover, Delaware; the 18th Annual Delmarva Chicken Festival took place June 17-19, 1965 in Salisbury, Maryland; the 19th Annual Delmarva Chicken Festival took place in 1966; the 20th Annual Delmarva Chicken Festival took place June 22-24, 1967 in Dover, Delaware; the 22nd Annual Delmarva Chicken Festival took place June 19-21, 1969 in Seaford, Delaware; the 60th Delmarva Chicken Festival took place June 19-20, 1990 in Centreville, Maryland; the Delmarva Chicken Festival took place June 12-13, 1998 in Millsboro, Delaware; the 65th Delmarva Chicken Festival took place June 20-21 in Centreville, Maryland; the 71st Annual Delmarva Chicken Festival took place in mid-June 2020 in Centreville, Maryland on a scaled-down basis caused by COVID-19 pandemic; the Delmarva Chicken Festival took place May 21, 2022 in Ocean View, Maryland.

== See also ==
- Tyson Foods, Inc.
- Perdue Farms, Inc.
- Mountaire Farms, Inc.
- Allen Family Foods, Inc.
