= Tanyard Branch (Marshyhope Creek tributary) =

Stream in Delaware, USA

Tanyard Branch Tributary to Marshyhope Creek
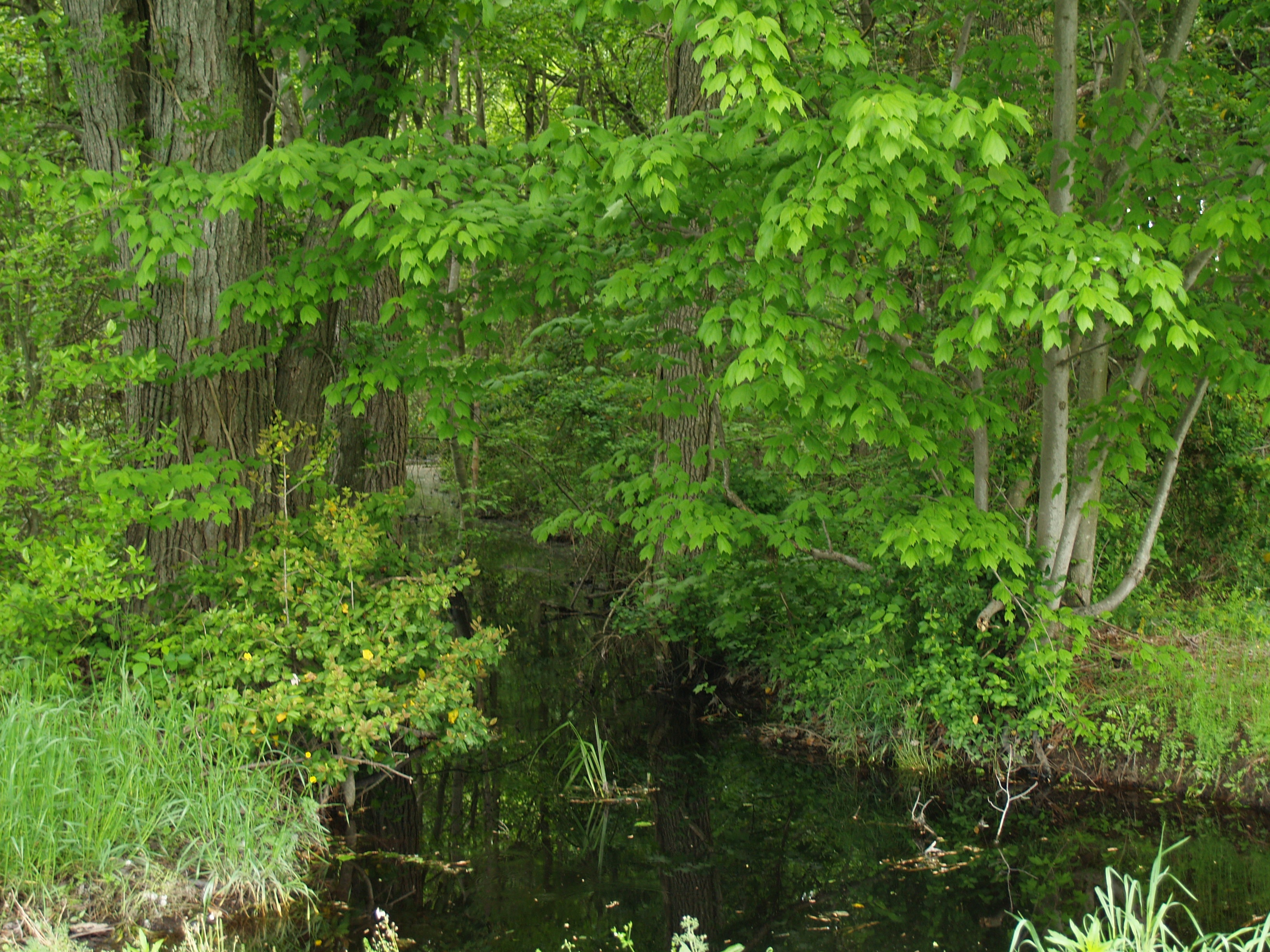
- Tanyard Branch in Delaware

- Location of Tanyard Branch mouth Tanyard Branch (Marshyhope Creek tributary) (the United States)

Location
- Country: United States
- State: Maryland; Delaware
- Counties: Caroline; Sussex

Physical characteristics
- Source: divide between Tanyard Branch and Bucks Branch of Clear Brook Creek
  - location: about 2 miles southwest of Atlanta, Delaware
  - coordinates: 38°41′42″N 075°41′26″W
  - elevation: 50 ft (15 m)
- Mouth: Marshyhope Creek
  - location: Federalsburg, Maryland
  - coordinates: 38°41′45″N 75°46′21″W
  - elevation: 5 ft (1.5 m)
- Length: 4.96 mi (7.98 km)
- Basin size: 4.93 square miles (12.8 km^{2})
- Discharge
  - location: Marshyhope Creek
  - average: 5.79 cu ft/s (0.164 m^{3}/s) at mouth with Marshyhope Creek

Basin features
- Progression: Marshyhope Creek → Nanticoke River → Chesapeake Bay → Atlantic Ocean
- River system: Nanticoke River
- Tributaries
  - left: unnamed tributaries
  - right: unnamed tributaries
- Waterbodies: Lake Chambers

Tanyard Branch is a 4.96 mi (7.98 km) long tributary to Marshyhope Creek that rises in western Sussex County, Delaware and flows west into Caroline County, Maryland.

== See also ==
- List of rivers of Delaware
- List of rivers of Maryland
- List of rivers of the United States
