= Clear Brook (Nanticoke River tributary) =

Stream in Delaware, United States

Clear Brook Tributary to Nanticoke River
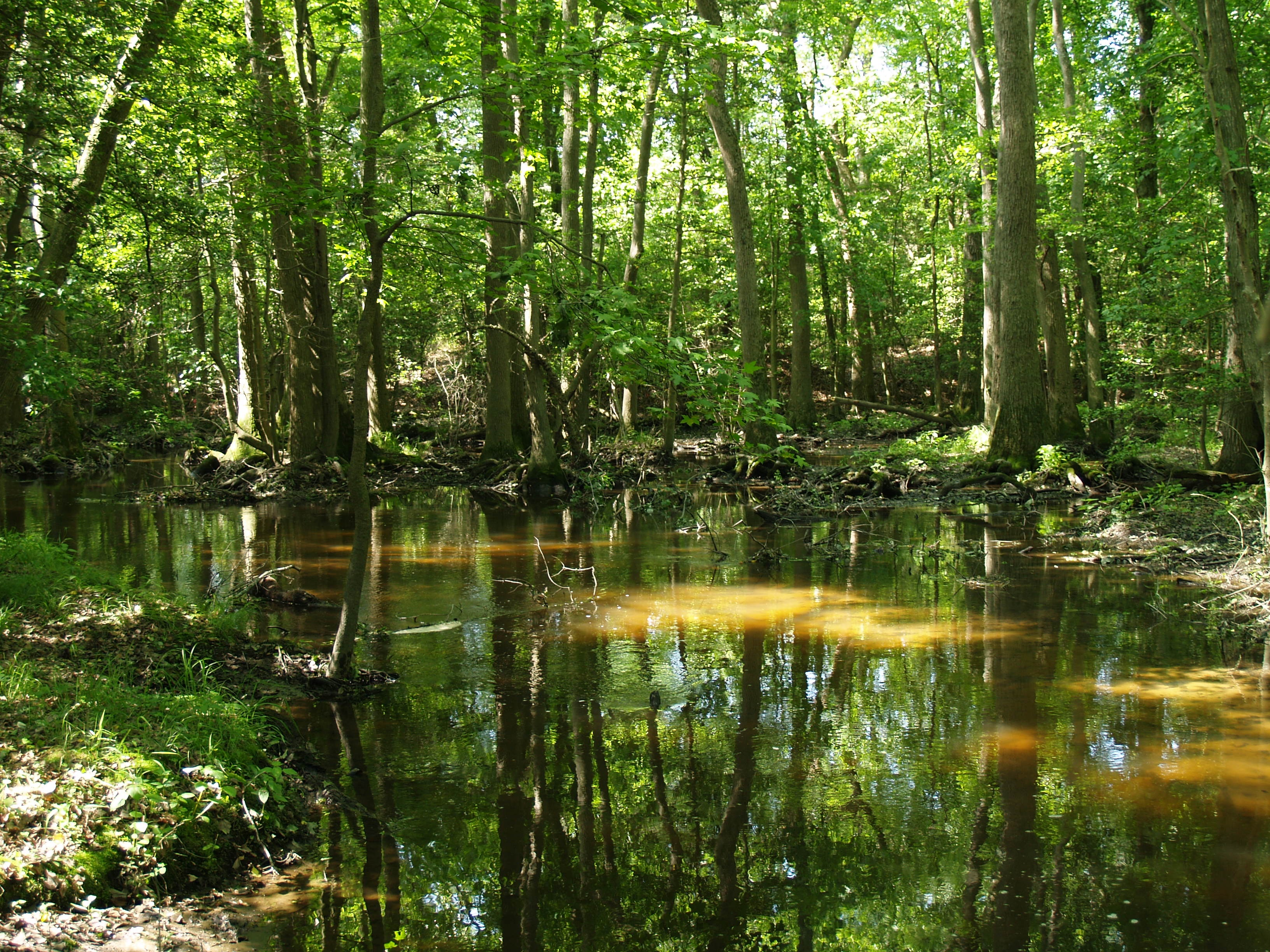
- Clear Brook downstream of Hearns Pond

- Location of Clear Brook mouth Clear Brook (Nanticoke River tributary) (the United States)

Location
- Country: United States
- State: Delaware
- County: Sussex

Physical characteristics
- Source: divide between Clear Brook and Bridgeville Branch of Nanticoke River
  - location: about 1 mile southwest of Bridgeville, Delaware
  - coordinates: 38°43′55″N 075°38′18″W
  - elevation: 46 ft (14 m)
- Mouth: Nanticoke River
  - location: Seaford, Delaware
  - coordinates: 38°38′27″N 075°36′22″W
  - elevation: 0 ft (0 m)
- Length: 8.87 mi (14.27 km)
- Basin size: 23.02 square miles (59.6 km^{2})
- Discharge
  - location: Nanticoke River
  - average: 27.29 cu ft/s (0.773 m^{3}/s) at mouth with Nanticoke River

Basin features
- Progression: Nanticoke River → Chesapeake Bay → Atlantic Ocean
- River system: Nanticoke River
- Tributaries
  - left: William H. Newton Ditch
  - right: Swain and Truitt Ditch; Bucks Branch; Herring Run
- Waterbodies: Hearns Pond; Williams Pond

Clear Brook is a 23.02 mi (37.05 km) long tributary to the Nanticoke River in Sussex County, Delaware. It joins the Nanticoke at "Williams Pond" in the City of Seaford, Delaware.

== See also ==
- List of Delaware rivers
