= Marshyhope Creek =

Marshyhope Creek Tributary to Nanticoke River
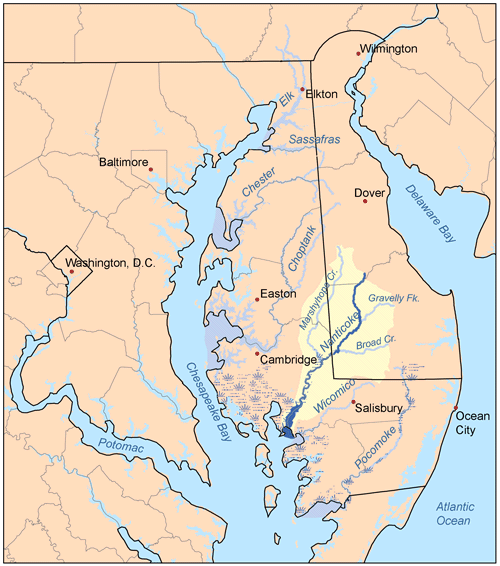
- Map of the rivers of the Eastern Shore of Maryland with the Nanticoke and its watershed highlighted and showing Marshyhope Creek.

Location
- Country: United States
- State: Delaware; Maryland
- Counties: Kent (DE); Sussex (DE); Caroline (MD); Dorchester (MD)

Physical characteristics
- Source: divide between Marshyhope Creek and Murderkill River
  - location: Minners Corners, Delaware
  - coordinates: 38°55′18″N 075°38′27″W
  - elevation: 60 ft (18 m)
- Mouth: Nanticoke River
  - location: Walnut Landing, Maryland
  - coordinates: 38°31′38″N 075°45′24″W
  - elevation: 0 ft (0 m)
- Length: 41.74 mi (67.17 km)
- Basin size: 41.74 square miles (108.1 km^{2})
- Discharge
  - average: 253.65 cu ft/s (7.183 m^{3}/s) at mouth with Nanticoke River

Basin features
- Progression: Nanticoke River → Chesapeake Bay → Atlantic Ocean
- River system: Nanticoke River
- Tributaries
  - left: Black Arm Prong; Prospect Branch; Tomahawk Branch; Quarter Branch; Double Fork Branch; Stafford Ditch; Iron Mine Branch; Jones Mill Branch; Jones Branch; Houston Branch; Twiford Meadow Ditch; Tanyard Branch; Miles Branch; Davis Millpond Branch; Puckum Branch; Mill Branch; Becky Taylor Branch; Messick Ditch
  - right: Horsepen Arm; Beaverdam Branch; Green Branch; Saulsbury Creek; Short and Hall Branch; Tommy Wright Branch; Sullivan Branch; Tull Branch; Faulkner Branch; Skinners Run; Wrights Branch; Mill Creek; Spears Creek; Big Indian Creek; Beach Branch; Mill Creek; Krafts Creek; Stony Bar Creek; Big Creek

Marshyhope Creek is a 37.0-mile-long (59.5 km) tributary of the Nanticoke River on the Delmarva Peninsula. It rises in Kent County, Delaware, and runs through Sussex County, Delaware, Caroline County, Maryland, and Dorchester County, Maryland.

Marshyhope Creek begins in southwestern Kent County, Delaware, near the city of Harrington, and ends at the Nanticoke River, near Sharptown, Maryland. The entire watershed is in the coastal plain and reaches sea level at Federalsburg, The head of navigation.

There are several small creeks on the western shore, including Faulkner Branch, Sullivan Branch, Capital Branch, Green Branch, and Horsepen Arm. On the eastern shore the small creeks include Tanyard Branch, Houston Branch, Jones Mill Branch, Double Fork Branch, Quarter Branch, Tomahawk Branch, and Prospect Point Branch.

== See also ==
- List of rivers of Delaware
