= Federalsburg, Maryland =

- Town
- Town of Federalsburg
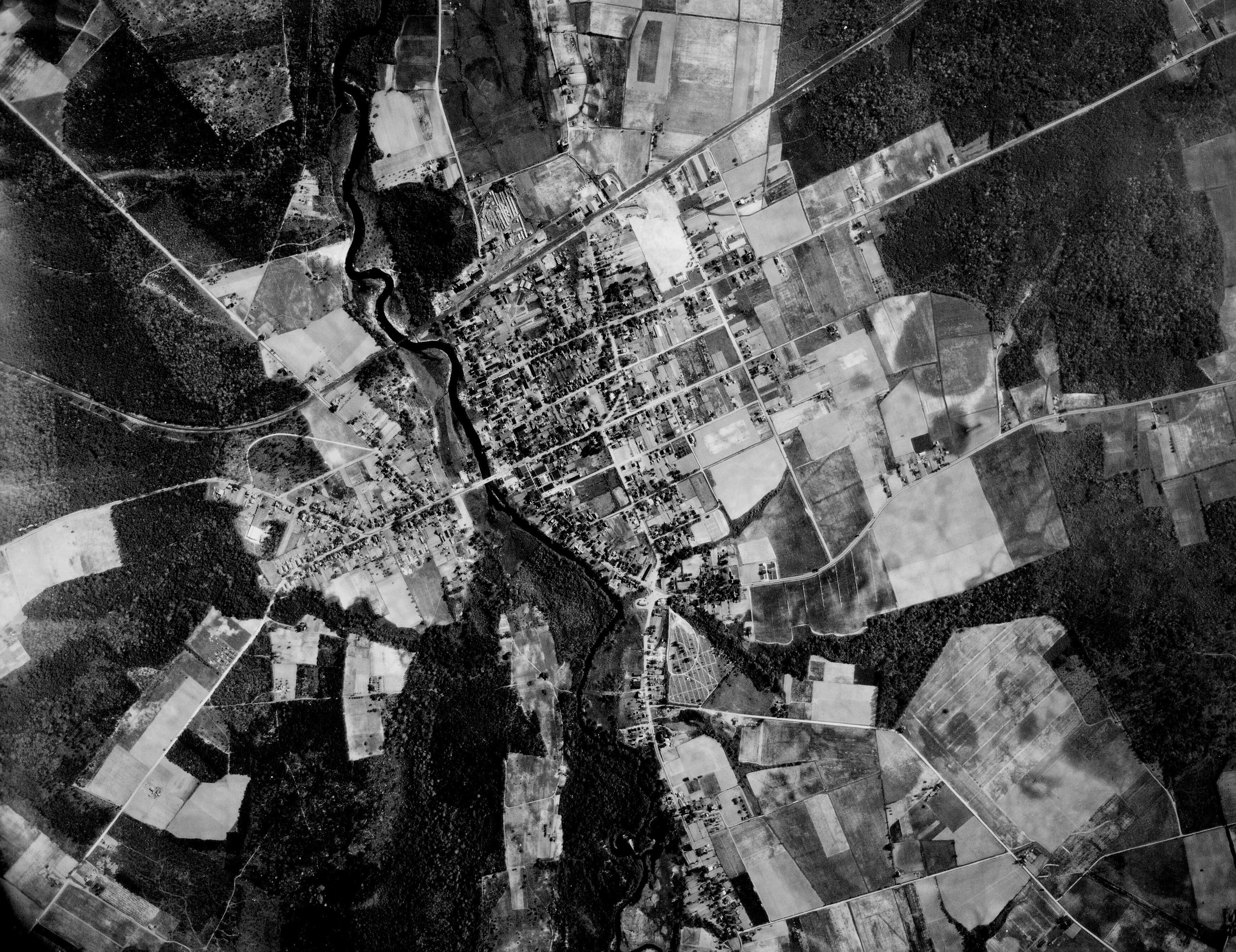
- Aerial view, 1930s

- Flag Seal
- Motto(s): "Pride in the Past, Faith in the Future"
- Location of Federalsburg, Maryland

- Location within the U.S. state of Maryland Federalsburg (the United States)
- Coordinates: 38°41′28″N 75°46′24″W
- Country: United States of America
- State: Maryland
- County: Caroline
- Incorporated: 1823

Government
  - Mayor: Kimberly M. Jahnigen

Area
  - Total: 1.98 sq mi (5.14 km^{2})
  - Land: 1.93 sq mi (5.00 km^{2})
  - Water: 0.058 sq mi (0.15 km^{2})
- Elevation: 3.3 ft (1 m)

Population (2020)
  - Total: 2,833
  - Density: 1,467.8/sq mi (566.73/km^{2})
- Time zone: UTC−5 (Eastern (EST))
  - Summer (DST): UTC−4 (EDT)
- ZIP code: 21632
- Area code: 410, 443, and 667
- FIPS code: 24-27900
- GNIS feature ID: 0593884
- Website: www.townoffederalsburg.org

Federalsburg is a town in Caroline County, Maryland, United States. As of the 2020 census, Federalsburg had a population of 2,833. It has one high school, Colonel Richardson High School.

== History ==
According to a contemporary source, the town was named for the Federalist Party, which met there in 1812, and was incorporated in 1823. A 1905 source says that Federalsburg was so named because it was settled by people from northern states.

== Geography ==
Federalsburg is located at 38°41′28″N 75°46′24″W (38.691126, -75.773296).

According to the United States Census Bureau, the town has a total area of 2.02 square miles (5.23 km^{2}), of which 1.93 square miles (5.00 km^{2}) is land and 0.09 square miles (0.23 km^{2}) is water.

== Demographics ==
Historical population
Census	Pop.	Note	%±
1880	338		—
1890	543		60.7%
1900	539		−0.7%
1910	1,050		94.8%
1920	1,288		22.7%
1930	1,369		6.3%
1940	1,748		27.7%
1950	1,878		7.4%
1960	2,060		9.7%
1970	1,917		−6.9%
1980	1,952		1.8%
1990	2,365		21.2%
2000	2,620		10.8%
2010	2,739		4.5%
2020	2,833		3.4%
U.S. Decennial Census

=== 2020 census ===
As of the 2020 census, Federalsburg had a population of 2,833. The median age was 34.1 years. 28.7% of residents were under the age of 18 and 14.4% of residents were 65 years of age or older. For every 100 females there were 85.4 males, and for every 100 females age 18 and over there were 79.1 males age 18 and over.

0.0% of residents lived in urban areas, while 100.0% lived in rural areas.

There were 1,089 households in Federalsburg, of which 38.4% had children under the age of 18 living in them. Of all households, 30.1% were married-couple households, 18.0% were households with a male householder and no spouse or partner present, and 42.2% were households with a female householder and no spouse or partner present. About 29.9% of all households were made up of individuals and 14.5% had someone living alone who was 65 years of age or older.

There were 1,210 housing units, of which 10.0% were vacant. The homeowner vacancy rate was 3.8% and the rental vacancy rate was 2.8%.

Racial composition as of the 2020 census
Race	Number	Percent
White	1,365	48.2%
Black or African American	1,237	43.7%
American Indian and Alaska Native	1	0.0%
Asian	28	1.0%
Native Hawaiian and Other Pacific Islander	3	0.1%
Some other race	43	1.5%
Two or more races	156	5.5%
Hispanic or Latino (of any race)	120	4.2%

=== 2010 census ===
As of the census of 2010, there were 2,739 people, 1,081 households, and 708 families living in the town. The population density was 1,419.2 inhabitants per square mile (548.0/km^{2}). There were 1,191 housing units at an average density of 617.1 per square mile (238.3/km^{2}). The racial makeup of the town was 53.8% White, 41.0% African American, 0.3% Native American, 0.8% Asian, 1.3% from other races, and 2.8% from two or more races. Hispanic or Latino of any race were 3.6% of the population.

There were 1,081 households, of which 41.0% had children under the age of 18 living with them, 31.8% were married couples living together, 26.9% had a female householder with no husband present, 6.8% had a male householder with no wife present, and 34.5% were non-families. 29.3% of all households were made up of individuals, and 11.5% had someone living alone who was 65 years of age or older. The average household size was 2.53 and the average family size was 3.10.

The median age in the town was 33.3 years. 30.8% of residents were under the age of 18; 9.5% were between the ages of 18 and 24; 24.3% were from 25 to 44; 23.1% were from 45 to 64; and 12.5% were 65 years of age or older. The gender makeup of the town was 45.2% male and 54.8% female.

=== 2000 census ===
As of the census of 2000, there were 2,620 people, 1,045 households, and 714 families living in the town. The population density was 1,341.5 inhabitants per square mile (518.0/km^{2}). There were 1,130 housing units at an average density of 578.6 per square mile (223.4/km^{2}). The racial makeup of the town was 58.93% White, 36.83% African Americans, 0.31% Native American, 0.65% Asian, 0.04% Pacific Islander, 0.38% from other races, and 2.86% from two or more races. Hispanic or Latino of any race were 1.11% of the population.

There were 1,045 households, out of which 37.1% had children under the age of 18 living with them, 38.4% were married couples living together, 25.0% had a female householder with no husband present, and 31.6% were non-families. 27.3% of all households were made up of individuals, and 13.8% had someone living alone who was 65 years of age or older. The average household size was 2.51 and the average family size was 2.97.

In the town, the age distribution of the population shows 30.8% under the age of 18, 9.7% from 18 to 24, 26.0% from 25 to 44, 19.4% from 45 to 64, and 14.2% who were 65 years of age or older. The median age was 33 years. For every 100 females, there were 81.8 males. For every 100 females age 18 and over, there were 74.9 males.

The median income for a household in the town was $24,266, and the median income for a family was $32,059. Males had a median income of $28,438 versus $21,296 for females. The per capita income for the town was $13,878. About 21.0% of families and 25.3% of the population were below the poverty line, including 35.2% of those under age 18 and 18.2% of those age 65 or over.

== Transportation ==
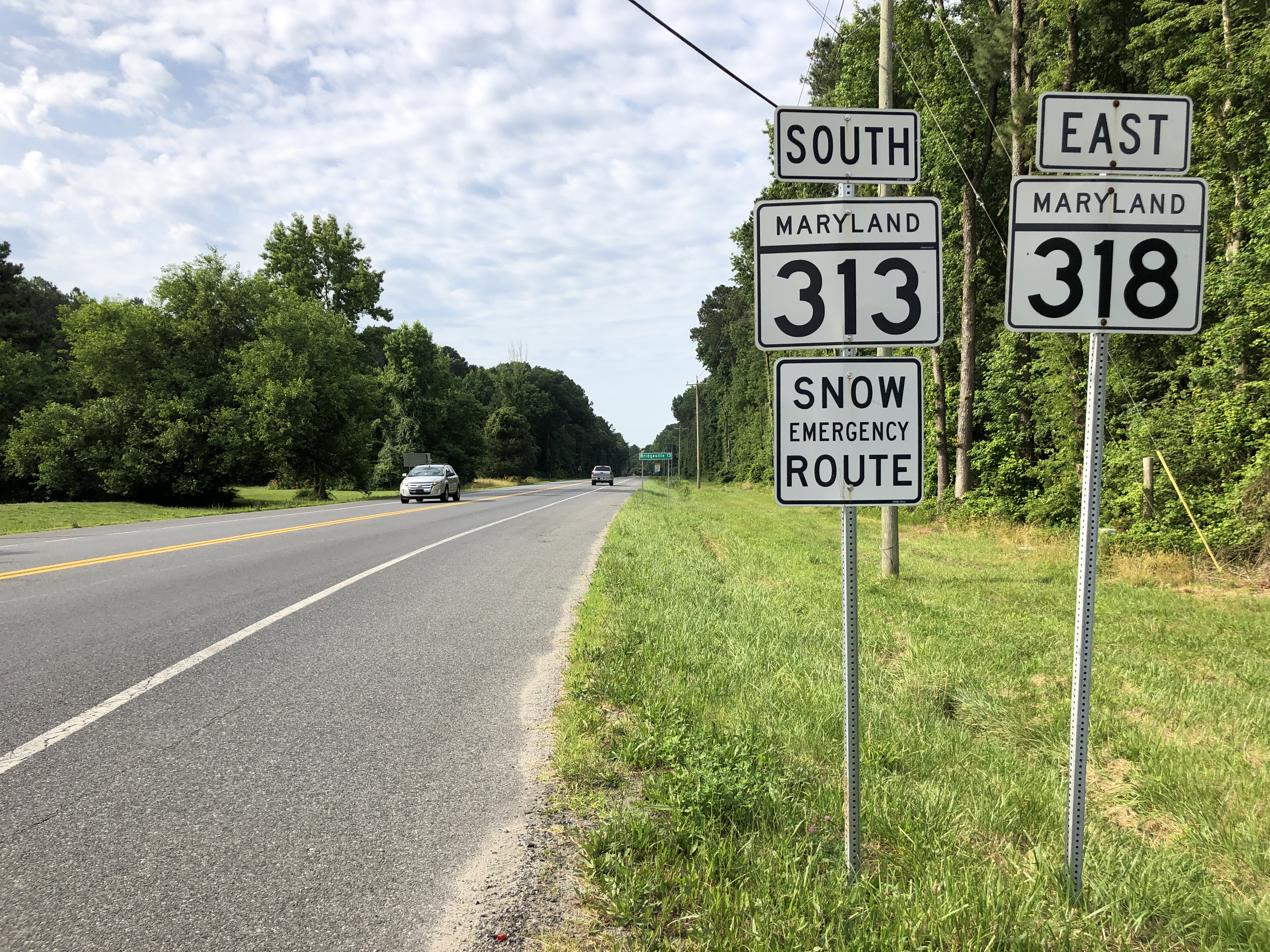
MD 313 and MD 318 in Federalsburg

The primary means of travel to and from Federalsburg is by road. The primary state highways serving the town are Maryland Route 318, which runs east–west, and Maryland Route 313, which runs north–south. The two roads are concurrent for much of their passage through Federalsburg, which has been diverted to the southern and western edges of town via a bypass. Other state highways serving the town include Maryland Route 307, Maryland Route 308 and Maryland Route 315. In addition, Maryland Route 306 ends at the northeast edge of town.

== Economy ==
Crystal Steel Fabricators Inc. is contracted to produce components for Ørsted offshore wind projects in Maryland and New Jersey.

== Arts and culture ==
Exeter was listed on the National Register of Historic Places in 1978.

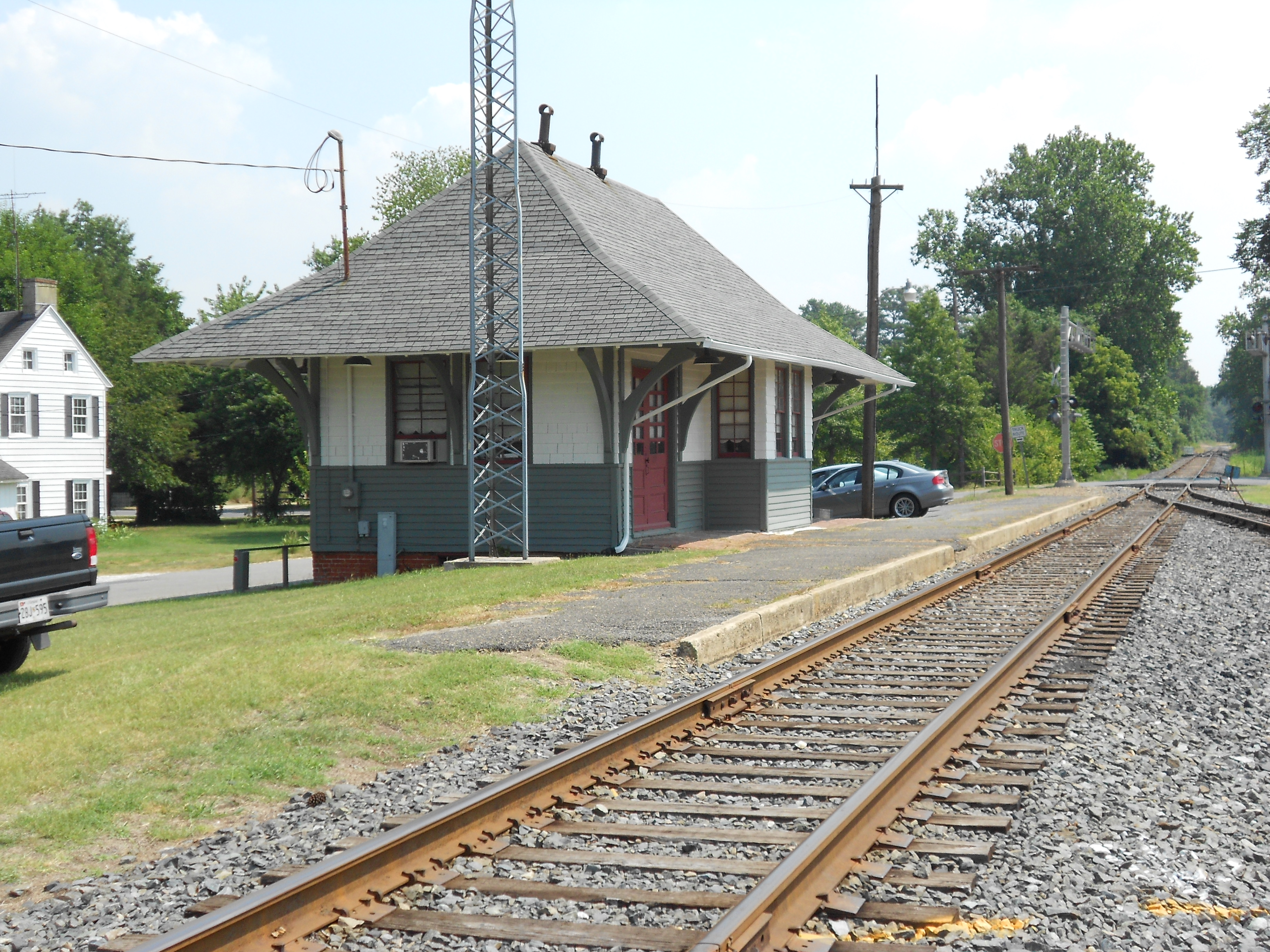
Historic train station in Federalsburg, restored as headquarters of Maryland and Delaware Railroad

The town hosted the 58th Annual Delmarva Chicken Festival in 2007 at Marshy Hope Marina Park, the second time it has done so.

== Sports ==
Federalsburg was home to the Federalsburg A's (which was the minor league affiliate of the Philadelphia Athletics), who played at Federal Park.

== Government ==
=== Town officials and staff ===
- Mayor: Kimberly Jahnigen Abner
- Council President: Scott Phillips
- Council Members: David Morean, Debra Varady Sewell, Edward H. Windsor
- Chief of Police: Michael A. McDermott
- Town Manager: Lawrence DiRe
- Clerk-Treasurer: Kristy L. Marshall
- Deputy Clerk: Melissa D. Hrobar
- Accounting Clerk: Kimberly M. Brown
- Main Street Manager/Grants Administrator: vacant
- Code Enforcement Officer: John Garlick
- Public Works Director: Steve Dyott

== Media ==
Federalsburg is the home of the radio station WTDK also known as THE DUCK.

== Notable people ==
- Robert "Ducky" Detweiler, former professional baseball player with the Boston Braves from 1942 to 1946.
- Robert Houston Noble, U.S. Army brigadier general
- Madeline Hurlock, actress
