= Nanticoke River =

Tributary of Chesapeake bay

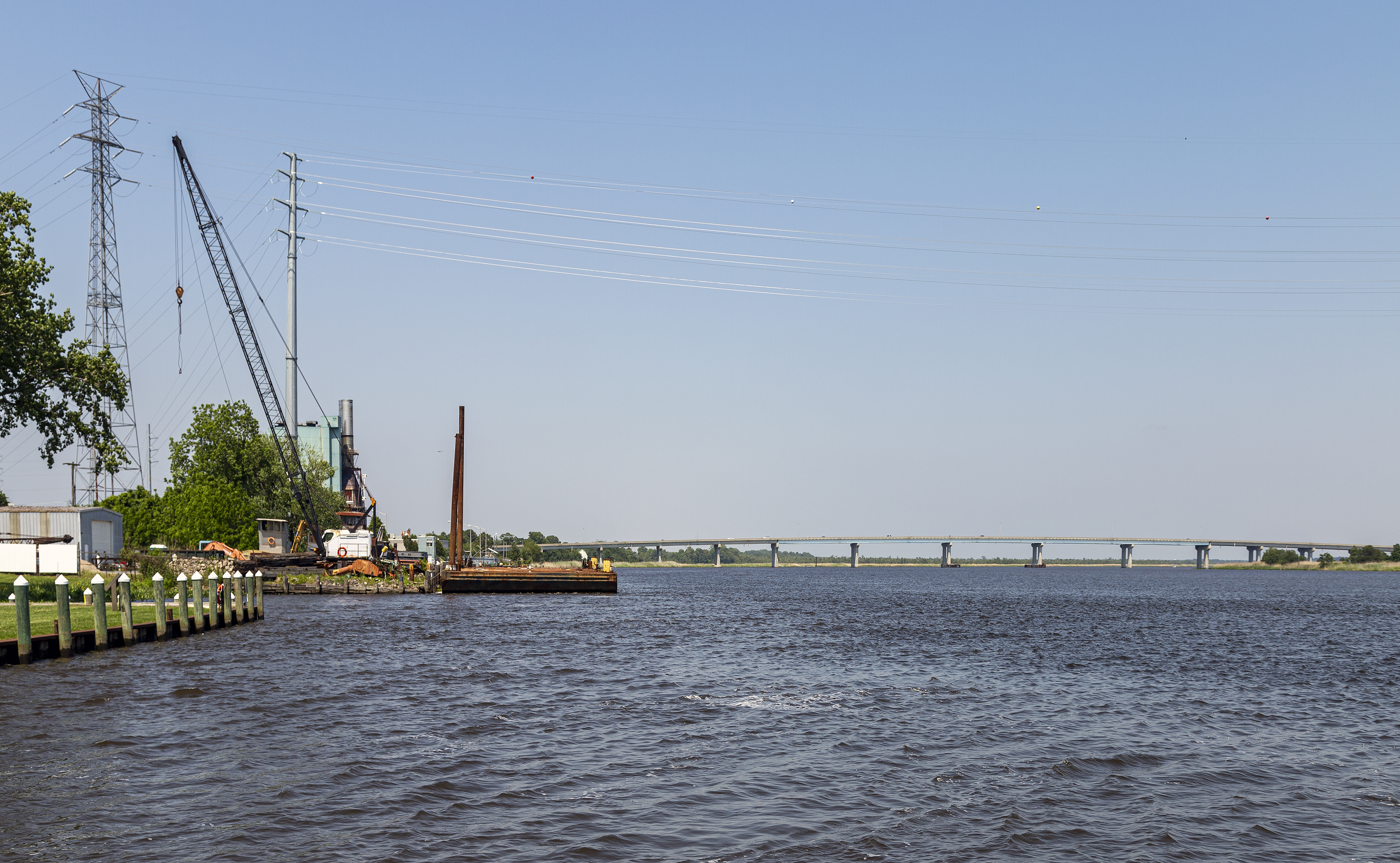
- The Nanticoke at Vienna, Maryland

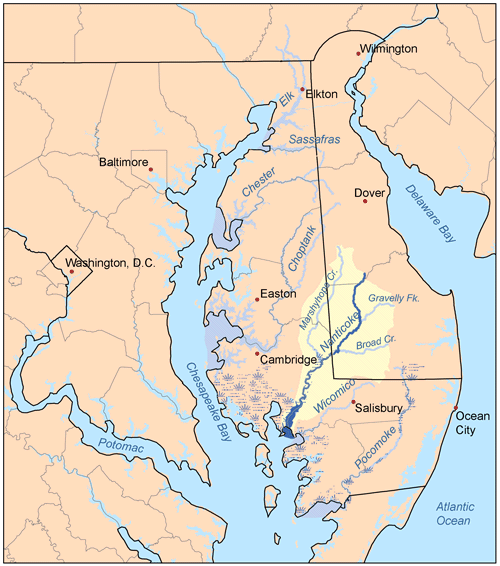
- Map of the rivers of the Eastern Shore of Maryland with the Nanticoke and its watershed highlighted.

Location
- Country: United States
- States: Maryland; Delaware
- Region: South Atlantic States

Physical characteristics
- Source
  - location: Middleford, Delaware
  - coordinates: 38°52′55″N 075°33′36″W
  - elevation: about 60 feet
- Mouth: Chesapeake Bay
  - location: Waterview, Maryland
  - coordinates: 38°14′00″N 075°55′29″W
  - elevation: sea level (0 ft.)
- Length: about 63 miles

Basin features
- Progression: Chesapeake Bay → Atlantic Ocean
- River system: Chesapeake Bay
- Tributaries
  - left: Kent-Sussex Line Branch, Glade Branch, Gum Branch, Gravelly Branch, Hurley Drain, Deep Creek, Morgan Branch, Gum Branch, Broad Creek, Beaverdam Branch, Cod Creek, Plum Creek, Reconow Creek, Owens Creek, Grimes Creek, Barren Creek, Ingem Gut, Den Creek, Rewastico Creek, Quantico Creek, Wetipquin Creek, Dunn Creek, Windsor Creek
  - right: White Marsh Branch, Cart Branch, Polk Branch, Birdgeville Branch, Turkey Branch, Ake Ditch, Clear Brook, Chapel Branch, Turtle Branch, Wright Creek, Gales Creek, Dennis Creek, Mill Creek, Molly Horn Creek, Marshyhope Creek, Chicone Creek, Redfin Creek, Mill Creek, Peach Orchard Creek, Wapremander Creek, Jacks Creek, Langrells Creek, Cow Creek

The Nanticoke River is a tributary of the Chesapeake Bay on the Delmarva Peninsula. It rises in southern Kent County, Delaware, flows through Sussex County, Delaware, and forms the boundary between Dorchester County, Maryland and Wicomico County, Maryland. The tidal river course proceeds southwest into the Tangier Sound of the Chesapeake Bay. The river is 64.3 miles (103.5 km) long. A 26-mile ecotourism water trail running along the River was set aside in July 2011 by Delaware state and federal officials, contiguous with a 37-mile water-trail extending through Maryland to the Chesapeake Bay.

Some of the main tributaries that feed the Nanticoke on the west-side include: Cow Creek; Jack Creek; Wapremander Creek; Marshyhope Creek; and the east side: Gravelly Fork, Gum Branch, and Broad Creek. Notable towns and communities situated along the river include Nanticoke, Bivalve, Vienna, and Sharptown in Maryland; and further north the city of Seaford, Delaware.

According to a study paid for by the town of Vienna, the English explorer John Smith travelled up the Nanticoke River and mapped it, and visited with Native Americans in their settlement, now believed to be Vienna.

The river was dredged in 1990 and 2013 to facilitate shipping travel along the course.

== See also ==
- List of rivers of Delaware
- List of rivers of Maryland
