= Delaware Route 15 =

State highway in Kent and New Castle counties in Delaware, United States

Delaware Route 15

Route information
- Maintained by DelDOT
- Length: 57.05 mi (91.81 km)
- Existed: 1984–present
- Tourist routes: Harriet Tubman Underground Railroad Byway

Major junctions
- South end: DE 14 near Milford
- DE 12 near Felton; US 13 / US 13 Alt. in Canterbury; DE 10 near Camden; DE 8 in Dover; DE 42 in Seven Hickories; DE 300 near Clayton; DE 6 in Clayton; DE 299 in Middletown; DE 286 near Summit Bridge
- North end: DE 71 / DE 896 in Summit Bridge

Location
- Country: United States
- State: Delaware
- Counties: Kent, New Castle

Highway system
- Delaware State Route System; List; Byways
← DE 14A	→ DE 16

Delaware Route 15 (DE 15) is a state highway in the U.S. state of Delaware. The route runs from DE 14 west of Milford in Kent County north to DE 71/DE 896 in Summit Bridge, New Castle County, just south of the Summit Bridge over the Chesapeake & Delaware Canal. DE 15 winds a path through many rural sections of Delaware, turning along many different roads. Most of the route, with the exception of the southern part of the route from Milford to Canterbury, runs to the west of U.S. Route 13 (US 13). DE 15 serves several cities and towns, including Wyoming, Dover, Clayton, and Middletown. The route intersects DE 12 near Felton, US 13 in Canterbury, DE 10 near Camden, DE 8 in Dover, DE 42 in Seven Hickories, DE 300 and DE 6 in the Clayton area, DE 299 in Middletown, and DE 286 near Summit Bridge.

What is now DE 15 was paved in several stages from the 1930s to the 1960s. By the 1980s, the route was designated between DE 14 in Milford and US 13 in Canterbury. By 1990, it was extended north to US 301/DE 299 near Middletown and then to US 301/DE 71/DE 896 near the Summit Bridge by 1994.

== Route description ==
=== Kent County ===
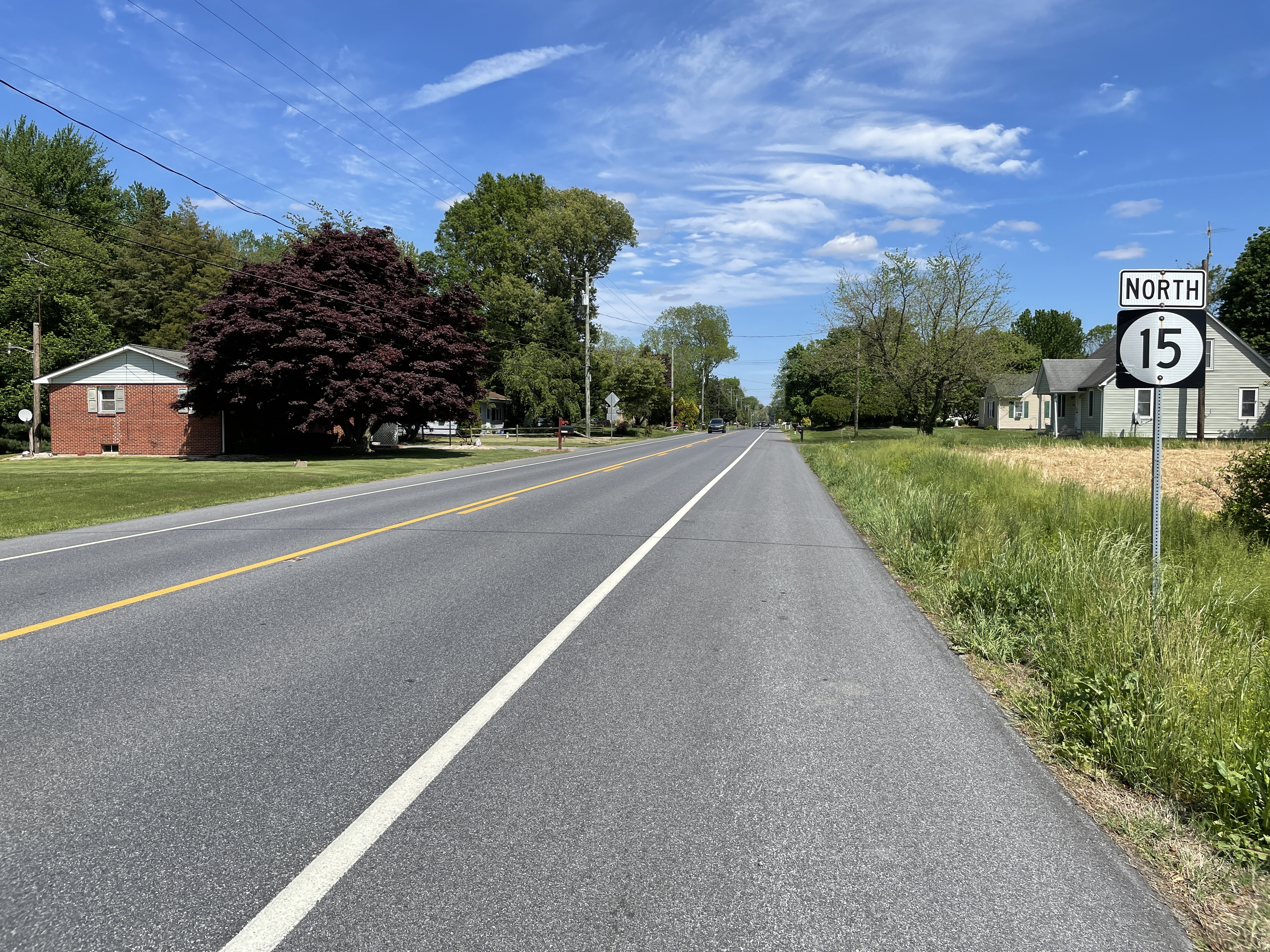
DE 15 northbound on Westville Road approaching Wyoming

DE 15 begins at an intersection with DE 14 and Holly Hill Road west of the city of Milford in Kent County and proceeds northwest on two-lane undivided Canterbury Road. The road runs through a mix of farmland and woodland with some homes, crossing Ward Branch and then Browns Branch to the east of McCauley Pond. DE 15 has a junction with Carpenter Bridge Road before it heads across the Murderkill River to the east of Coursey Pond. The route intersects DE 12 and heads across Pratt Branch before it runs to the east of Henderson Aviation Airport. DE 15 crosses Hudson Branch and reaches the community of Canterbury, where it passes homes and crosses Irish Hill Road before it comes to an intersection with US 13.

DE 15 turns north to form a concurrency with US 13 for a short distance on the four-lane divided South Dupont Highway before continuing northwest along with US 13 Alt. on two-lane undivided Upper King Road. The road continues through rural land before entering the town of Woodside. Here, US 13 Alt./DE 15 passes homes and intersects DE 10 Alt., with DE 15 splitting from US 13 Alt. by heading west concurrent with DE 10 Alt. on Main Street and crossing the Delmarva Central Railroad's Delmarva Subdivision line at-grade.

DE 15 splits from DE 10 Alt. by turning north on Dundee Road, leaving Woodside. The road heads through a mix of farmland, woodland, and residential subdivisions, crossing Tidbury Creek before coming to a roundabout with DE 10, where the road briefly becomes a divided highway. Past this intersection, the route becomes Moose Lodge Road and continues north. DE 15 turns east onto Westville Road and enters the town of Wyoming, where it becomes Southern Boulevard and passes homes and some businesses. The route turns northeast onto South Railroad Avenue and runs immediately to the west of the Delmarva Central Railroad. The road becomes North Railroad Avenue upon intersecting Grant Street west of the former Wyoming station before it leaves Wyoming as it crosses Isaac Branch to the east of Wyoming Lake. At this point, DE 15 becomes Wyoming Mill Road and heads north through agricultural areas away from the railroad tracks. The route has an intersection with Wyoming Mill Spur, which heads east to POW/MIA Parkway. The road continues through farmland with some woods and residential development before entering the city of Dover and curving to the northwest.

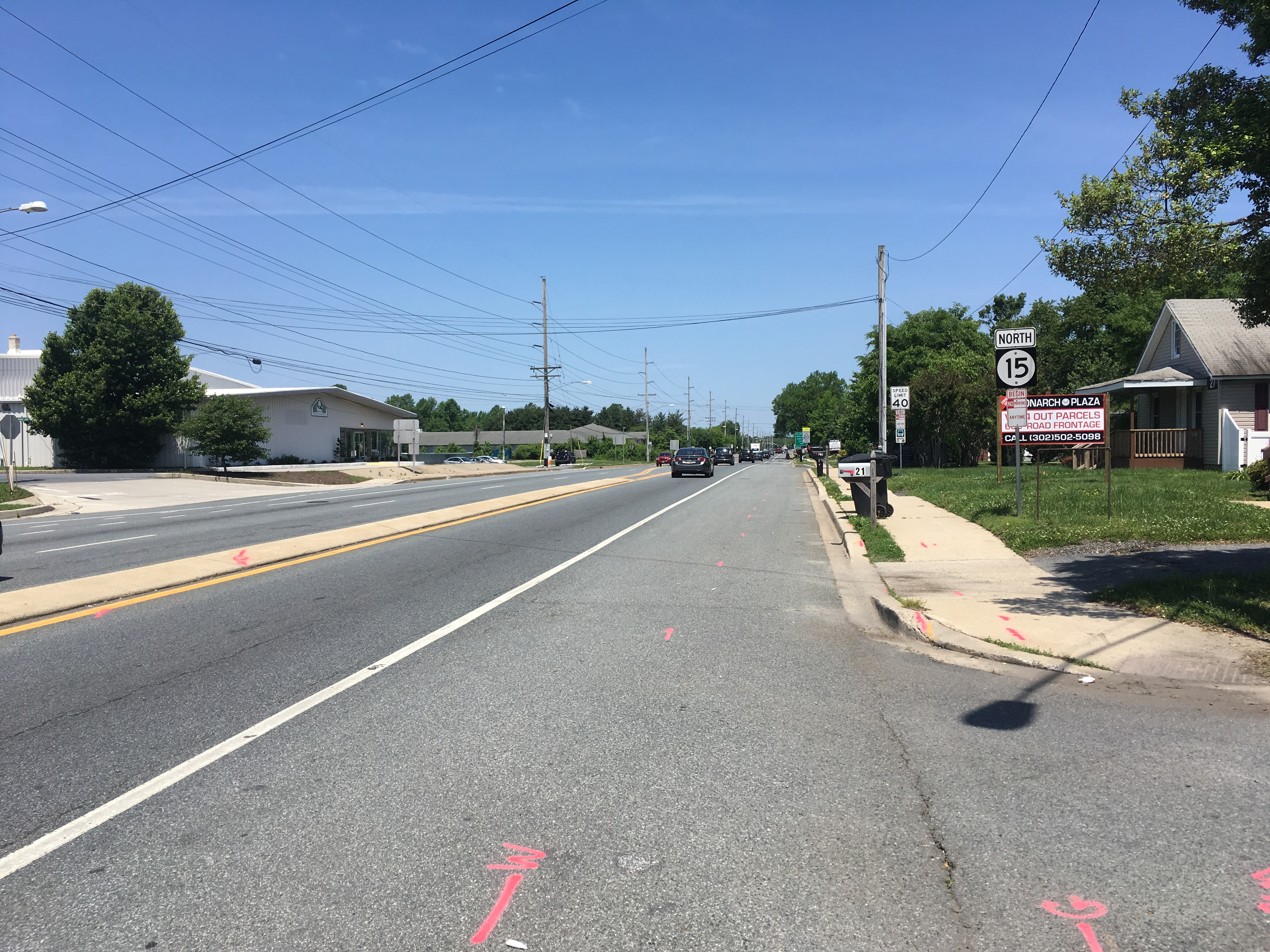
DE 15 northbound past DE 8 in Dover

Here, DE 15 turns east onto Hazlettville Road and heads into industrial areas, where it becomes West North Street and widens into a four-lane road. At an intersection with the northern terminus of POW/MIA Parkway, the route turns north onto Saulsbury Road, a four-lane divided highway that soon narrows to a two-lane undivided road. The road continues through more commercial areas and comes to an intersection with DE 8, where it is briefly a divided highway. Past this intersection, DE 15 continues north as a three-lane road with a center left-turn lane, coming to a junction with Walker Road. At this intersection, the road briefly gains a median. Past this intersection, the road name changes to McKee Road and it regains a center left-turn lane, running northwest through residential areas with some fields and commercial development. The route turns into a divided highway for a short distance at the College Road intersection before becoming undivided. DE 15 turns west to remain on two-lane undivided McKee Road, with Scarborough Road continuing north to US 13 and the DE 1 toll road. Past Scarborough Road, the route heads northwest near an industrial park before it leaves Dover.

Upon leaving Dover, DE 15 continues through a mix of farmland and woodland with some residential areas, turning southwest onto West Denneys Road and then north onto Kenton Road. The road crosses Fork Branch and curves to the north-northwest, crossing Pearsons Corner Road before reaching an intersection with DE 42 in Moores Corner. At this point, DE 15 turns west to form a concurrency with DE 42 on Seven Hickories Road. In Seven Hickories, DE 15 splits from DE 42 by heading north on Brenford Road. The route splits from Brenford Road and continues northwest on Mount Friendship Road, crossing the Leipsic River before reaching an intersection with DE 300. Here, DE 15 turns northeast for a brief concurrency with DE 300 on Wheatleys Pond Road before it splits by making a turn northwest onto Alley Corner Road. The road crosses Mill Creek and an abandoned railroad line before it comes to an intersection with DE 6. At this point, DE 15 turns east to form a concurrency with DE 6 on Millington Road. On the western edge of the town of Clayton, DE 15 splits from DE 6 by heading northeast on Duck Creek Road, running through residential areas with some industry and passing to the east of the First State Military Academy. The road curves to the north and leaves Clayton.

=== New Castle County ===
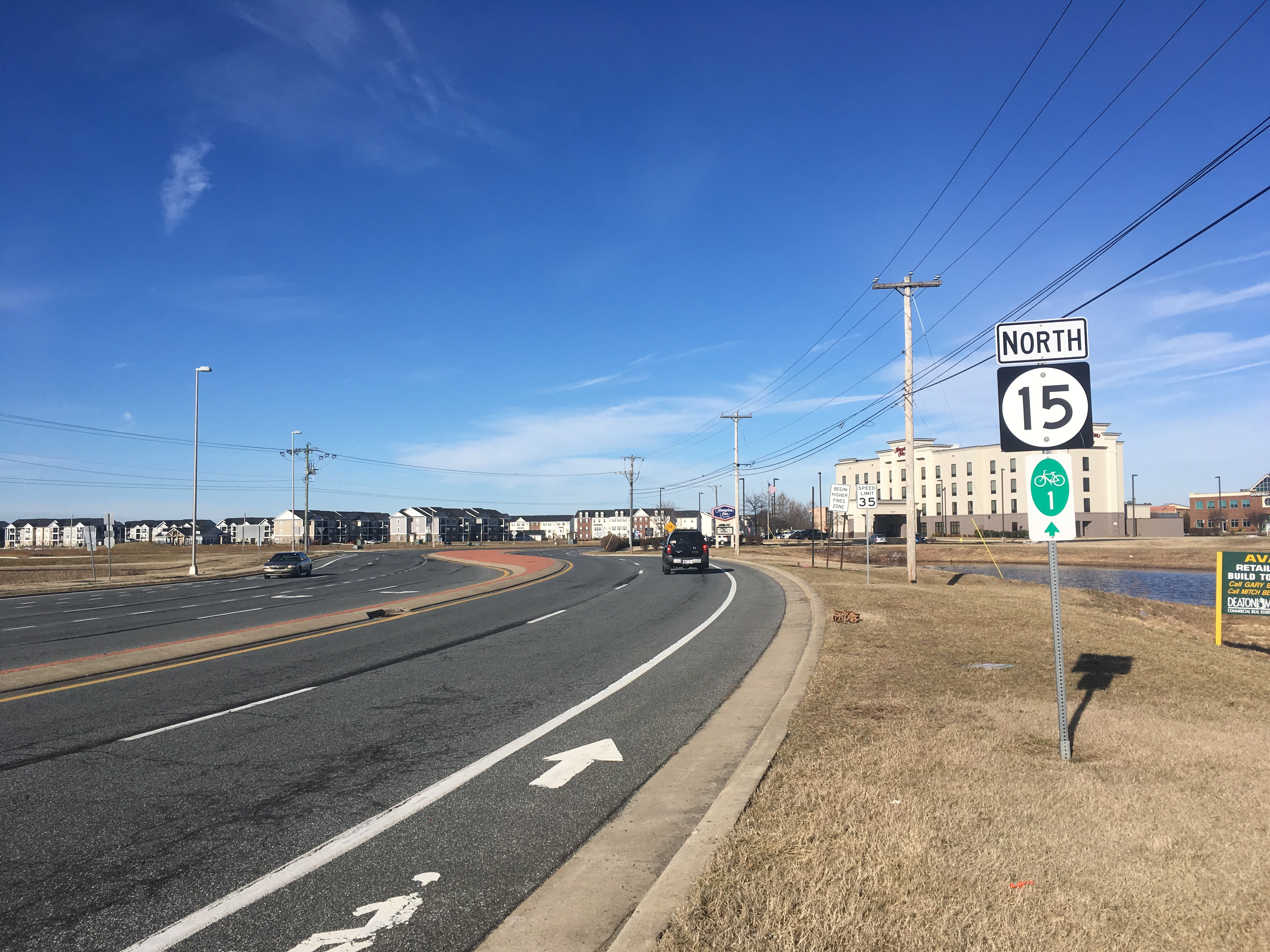
DE 15 northbound past DE 299 in Middletown

DE 15 crosses the Providence Creek into New Castle County and the name becomes Clayton Greenspring Road as it passes through farm fields and woods with some homes. The route turns west onto Vandyke Greenspring Road and skirts the southern edge of the Blackbird State Forest, curving to the west-northwest and crossing Blackbird Creek. DE 15 turns north onto Dexter Corner Road before it continues west onto Blackbird Station Road, curving to the northwest. The route crosses the Maryland and Delaware Railroad's Northern Line at-grade before heading across Barlow Branch and turning north at the Ebenezer Church Road intersection to remain along Blackbird Station Road. Upon crossing Caldwell Corner Road, the road name changes to Dogtown Road and it curves to the northwest again. The route runs through agricultural areas, crossing the Appoquinimink River, and turns north-northeast onto Levels Road. DE 15 enters the town of Middletown, passing to the west of a residential neighborhood before turning northwest at a roundabout with St. Annes Church Road and Wallasey Drive to remain on Levels Road and reach an intersection with DE 299.

At this point, DE 15 turns northeast to join DE 299 on four-lane divided Middletown Warwick Road, entering commercial areas in the western part of Middletown. At an intersection, the two routes split, with DE 15 heading northwest on Bunker Hill Road, DE 299 turning east onto West Main Street, and Middletown Warwick Road continuing north. Past DE 299, DE 15 is briefly a four-lane divided highway before it becomes a two-lane divided road, running through areas of homes and businesses and becoming undivided. The roadway passes over the US 301 toll road, where it has a ramp for emergency vehicles but no public access, before heading northeast of Appoquinimink High School. At a roundabout with School Drive and Choptank Road, the route turns north onto Choptank Road and leaves Middletown, heading through agricultural areas with some woods and residential development and coming to a roundabout with Churchtown Road. DE 15 intersects the eastern terminus of DE 286 at a roundabout and continues northeast along Bethel Church Road, ending at an intersection with DE 71/DE 896 in the community of Summit Bridge, just south of the Summit Bridge that carries DE 71/DE 896 over the Chesapeake & Delaware Canal.

The section of DE 15 between DE 14 and US 13 serves as part of a secondary hurricane evacuation route from coastal areas in southern Delaware. The portion of the route along the DE 6 concurrency west of Clayton and between Alley Mill Road and Caldwell Corner Road in southwestern New Castle County is part of the Harriet Tubman Underground Railroad Byway, a Delaware Byway. DE 15 has an annual average daily traffic count ranging from a high of 30,257 vehicles at the Walker Road intersection in Dover to a low of 806 vehicles at the Caldwell Corner Road intersection south of Middletown. The portions of DE 15 concurrent with US 13, between DE 8 and Scarborough Road, and along the DE 299 concurrency are part of the National Highway System.

== History ==
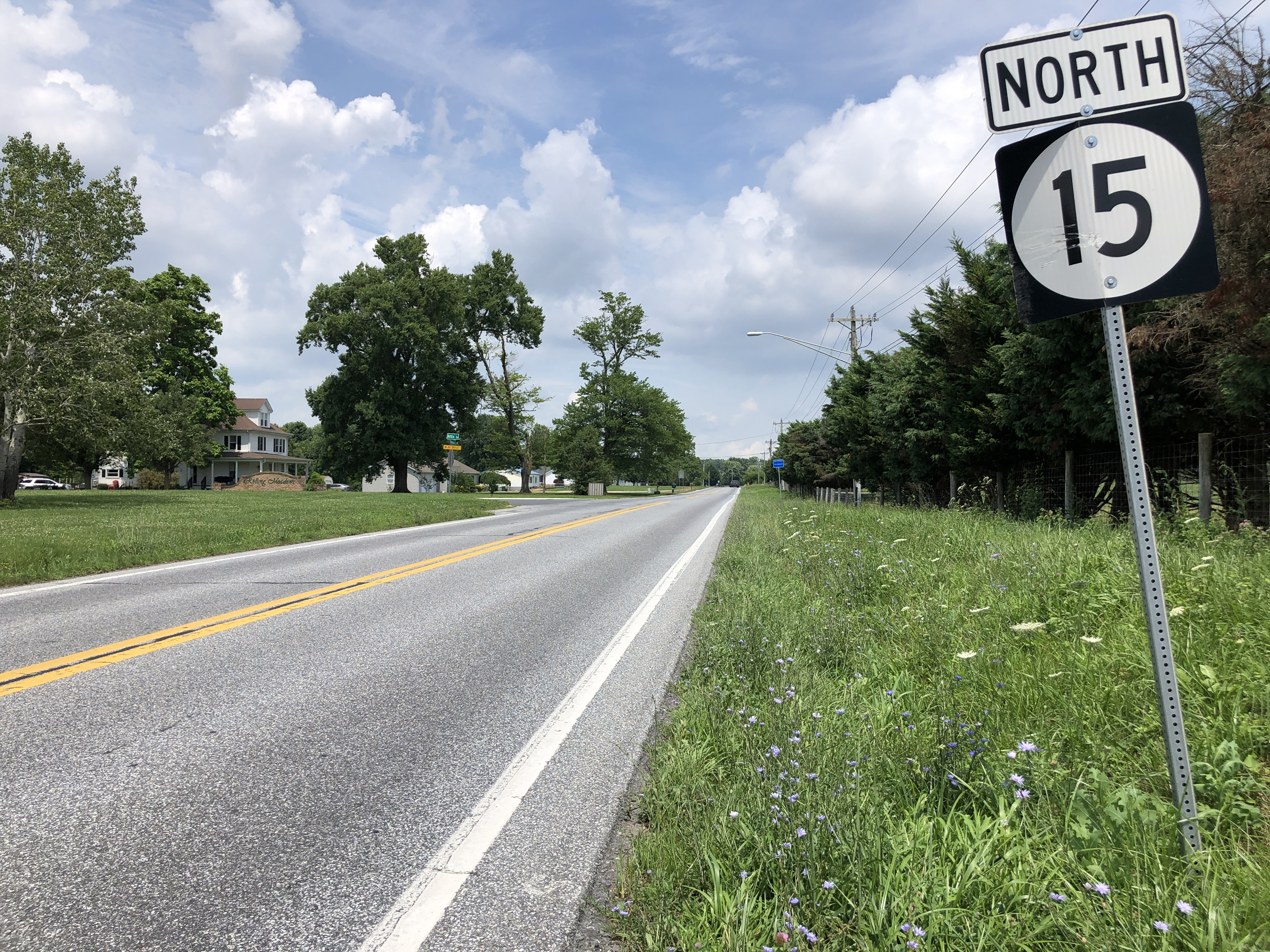
DE 15 northbound past DE 42 in Seven Hickories

By 1920, the roads that comprise present-day DE 15 existed as county roads. Bunker Hill Road was paved by 1932, with Levels Road being constructed as a state highway by this time. Four years later, the segment between DE 12 and US 13, Brenford Road, a portion north of DE 6, and Bethel Church Road were paved, while Kenton Road was paved three years later. Paving was completed on the sections between DE 14 and Carpenter Bridge Road and from DE 8 to Kenton Road by 1942, and the entire segment between Clayton and Middletown excluding a portion of Blackbird Station Road. The remainder of the road between Milford and Canterbury, the portion between Woodside and DE 10, the portion between Wyoming and Dover, and the segment of Choptank Road between Bohemia Church Road and Bethel Church Road were all paved by 1952. The remainder of the route between Clayton and Middletown was paved two years later. By 1957, paving was completed on the remainder of Choptank Road. The section between Woodside and Wyoming was fully paved by 1959. The Mt. Friendship Road part of the current route was paved by 1964. Two years later, the paving of present-day DE 15 was completed when Alley Corner Road was paved.

DE 15 was designated to run from DE 14 near Milford north to US 13 in Canterbury by 1984. The route was extended north to US 301/DE 299 west of Middletown by 1990. Four years later, DE 15 was extended farther north to US 301/DE 71/DE 896 near the Summit Bridge. In 2005, a $1.5 million construction project realigned the southern terminus of DE 15 to a four-way intersection with DE 14 and Holly Hill Road in order to improve traffic congestion and safety. In June 2007, construction began on a $11.3 million project to improve the Choptank Road portion of DE 15 by widening the travel lanes, adding shoulders, and constructing roundabouts at Bunker Hill Road, Churchtown Road, and DE 286. The project was completed on May 27, 2010. In 2011, Wyoming Mill Road was realigned to intersect Hazlettville Road further to the west at a signalized intersection, reducing congestion. This project, which cost over $1.8 million, was funded by the American Recovery and Reinvestment Act of 2009. On June 5, 2017, construction began for a roundabout at the junction with DE 10 west of Camden in order to improve safety at the intersection. The roundabout was completed by September 2017.

== Major intersections ==
County	Location	mi	km	Destinations	Notes
Kent	Milford	0.00	0.00	DE 14 (Milford Harrington Highway) – Milford, Houston, Harrington	Southern terminus
Kent		6.94	11.17	DE 12 (Midstate Road) – Felton, Frederica	
Kent	Canterbury	10.14	16.32	US 13 south (South Dupont Highway) – Felton	South end of US 13 overlap
Kent	Canterbury			US 13 north (South Dupont Highway) – Dover US 13 Alt. begins (Upper King Road)	North end of US 13 overlap; south end of US 13 Alt. overlap; southern terminus of US 13 Alt.
Kent	Woodside	11.90	19.15	US 13 Alt. north (Upper King Road) – Camden DE 10 Alt. east (Walnut Shade Road) – Rising Sun	North end of US 13 Alt. overlap; south end of DE 10 Alt. overlap
Kent	Woodside	12.41	19.97	DE 10 Alt. west (Main Street) – Petersburg	North end of DE 10 Alt. overlap
Kent	Camden	14.14	22.76	DE 10 (Willow Grove Road)	Roundabout
Kent	Dover	20.34	32.73	DE 8 (Forrest Avenue/Forest Street) – Hartly, Dover	
Kent	Moores Corner	26.71	42.99	DE 42 east (Seven Hickories Road)	South end of DE 42 overlap
Kent	Seven Hickories	27.28	43.90	DE 42 west (Seven Hickories Road)	North end of DE 42 overlap
Kent		30.53	49.13	DE 300 west (Wheatleys Pond Road)	South end of DE 300 overlap
Kent		30.69	49.39	DE 300 east (Wheatleys Pond Road)	North end of DE 300 overlap
Kent	Clayton	33.31	53.61	DE 6 west (Millington Road)	South end of DE 6 overlap
Kent	Clayton	34.56	55.62	DE 6 east (Millington Road)	North end of DE 6 overlap
New Castle	Middletown	49.29	79.32	DE 299 west (Levels Road) to US 301 Toll – Wilmington, Annapolis	South end of DE 299 overlap
New Castle	Middletown	50.34	81.01	DE 299 east (West Main Street) – Middletown, Odessa	North end of DE 299 overlap
New Castle	Summit Bridge	56.21	90.46	DE 286 west (Bethel Church Road)	Roundabout; eastern terminus of DE 286
New Castle	Summit Bridge	57.05	91.81	DE 71 / DE 896 (Summit Bridge Road)	Northern terminus
1.000 mi = 1.609 km; 1.000 km = 0.621 mi: Concurrency terminus
