= Greens Branch (Duck Creek tributary) =

Greens Branch Tributary to Duck Creek
- Location within Delaware Location within the United States

Location
- Country: United States
- State: Delaware
- County: Kent
- City: Smyrna

Physical characteristics
- Source: Providence Creek divide
  - location: about 0.2 miles southwest of Alley Corners, Delaware
  - coordinates: 39°16′15″N 075°40′00″W
  - elevation: 57 ft (17 m)
- Mouth: Duck Creek (Duck Creek Pond)
  - location: Smyrna, Delaware
  - coordinates: 39°15′49″N 075°39′44″W
  - elevation: 0 ft (0 m)
- Length: 4.36 mi (7.02 km)
- Basin size: 3.51 square miles (9.1 km^{2})
- Discharge
  - average: 4.27 cu ft/s (0.121 m^{3}/s) at mouth with Duck Creek

Basin features
- Progression: north-northeast
- River system: Smyrna River
- Tributaries
  - left: unnamed tributaries
  - right: unnamed tributaries
- Bridges: Alley Corner Road, DE 6, North Main Street

Greens Branch is a 4.36 mi (7.02 km) long 2nd order tributary to Duck Creek in Kent County, Delaware.

== Variant names ==
According to the Geographic Names Information System, it has also been known historically as:

- Duck Creek

== Course ==
Greens Branch rises on the Providence Creek divide about 0.2 miles southwest of Alley Corners, Delaware.

== Watershed ==
Greens Branch drains 3.51 square miles (9.1 km^{2}) of area, receives about 44.7 in/year of precipitation, has a topographic wetness index of 644.03 and is about 2.8% forested.

== See also ==
- List of rivers of Delaware
