= Morris Branch (Corks Point Ditch tributary) =

Morris Branch Tributary to Corks Point Ditch
- Location within Delaware Location within the United States

Location
- Country: United States
- State: Delaware
- County: New Castle

Physical characteristics
- Source: Sawmill Branch divide
  - location: about 0.5 miles west of Walker, Delaware
  - coordinates: 39°20′22″N 075°36′56″W
  - elevation: 45 ft (14 m)
- Mouth: Corks Point Ditch
  - location: about 1 mile southeast of Walker, Delaware
  - coordinates: 39°20′05″N 075°35′07″W
  - elevation: 0 ft (0 m)
- Length: 3.13 mi (5.04 km)
- Basin size: 2.98 square miles (7.7 km^{2})
- Discharge
  - average: 3.58 cu ft/s (0.101 m^{3}/s) at mouth with Corks Point Ditch

Basin features
- Progression: southeast then northeast
- River system: Smyrna River
- Tributaries
  - left: unnamed tributaries
  - right: unnamed tributaries
- Bridges: Smyrna Landing Road, Paddock Road, Smyrna Landing Road, Alabam Road

Morris Branch (historically Morris Run) is a 3.13 mi (5.04 km) long 1st order tributary to Corks Point Ditch in New Castle County, Delaware.

== Course ==
Morris Branch rises the Sawmill Branch divide about 0.5 miles west of Walker in New Castle County, Delaware. Morris Branch then flows southeast then northeast to meet Corks Point Ditch about 1 mile southeast of Walker, Delaware.

== Watershed ==
Morris Branch drains 2.98 square miles (7.7 km^{2}) of area, receives about 44.9 in/year of precipitation, has a topographic wetness index of 556.00 and is about 13.9% forested.

== See also ==
- List of rivers of Delaware
