= Massey Branch (Green Spring Branch tributary) =

Massey Branch Tributary to Green Spring Branch
- Location within Delaware Location within the United States

Location
- Country: United States
- State: Delaware
- County: New Castle

Physical characteristics
- Source: Blackbird Creek divide
  - location: Pond about 0.5 miles northeast of Prices Corners, Delaware
  - coordinates: 39°19′50″N 075°40′30″W
  - elevation: 62 ft (19 m)
- Mouth: Green Spring Branch
  - location: Brookmill Estates, Delaware
  - coordinates: 39°19′16″N 075°38′28″W
  - elevation: 32 ft (9.8 m)
- Length: 1.76 mi (2.83 km)
- Basin size: 1.58 square miles (4.1 km^{2})
- Discharge
  - average: 1.91 cu ft/s (0.054 m^{3}/s) at mouth with Green Spring Branch

Basin features
- Progression: southeast
- River system: Smyrna River
- Tributaries
  - left: unnamed tributaries
  - right: unnamed tributaries
- Bridges: Blackbird-Greenspring Road

Massey Branch is a 1.76 mi (2.83 km) long 1st order tributary to Green Spring Branch in New Castle County, Delaware.

== Course ==
Massey Branch rises in a pond on the Blackbird Creek divide about 0.5 miles northeast of Prices Corners, Delaware.

== Watershed ==
Massey Branch drains 1.58 square miles (4.1 km^{2}) of area, receives about 44.3 in/year of precipitation, has a topographic wetness index of 605.20 and is about 1.4% forested.

== See also ==
- List of rivers of Delaware
