= Appoquinimink =

Appoquinimink may refer to:

- Appoquinimink Hundred, an unincorporated subdivision of New Castle County, Delaware
- Appoquinimink River, a river in northern Delaware
- Appoquinimink School District, a public school district in New Castle County, Delaware

The word Appoquinimink comes from a native American word that loosely translates to "wounded duck".
