= Sandom Branch =

Stream in Delaware, USA

Sandom Branch Tributary to Blackbird Creek
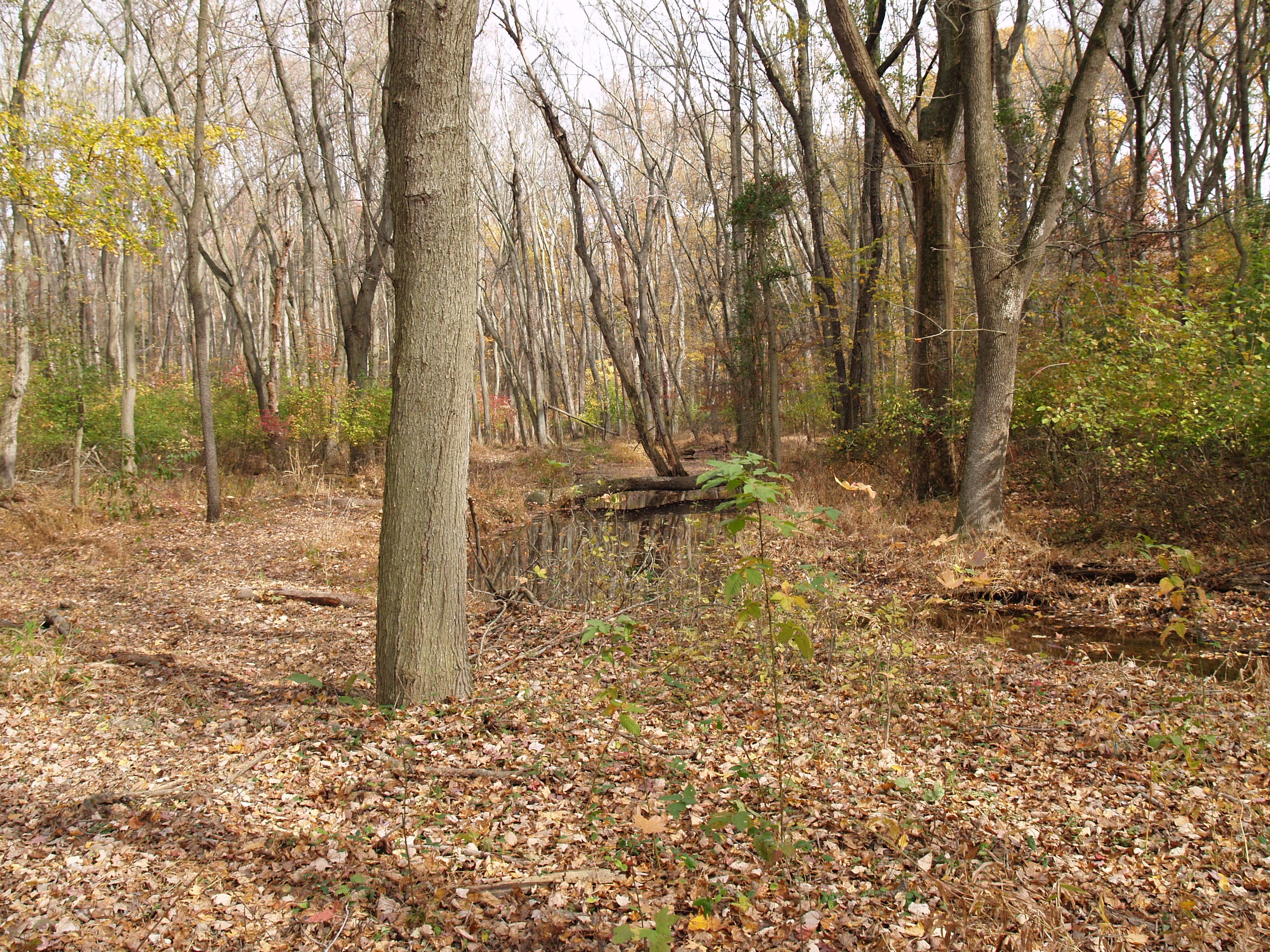
- Floodplain of Sandom Branch downstream of DE 1 in 2008

- Location of Sandom Branch mouth Sandom Branch (the United States)

Location
- Country: United States
- State: Delaware
- County: New Castle

Physical characteristics
- Source: divide between Sandom Branch and Duck Creek
  - location: about 2 miles south of Blackbird, Delaware
  - coordinates: 39°20′37″N 075°40′22″W
  - elevation: 50 ft (15 m)
- Mouth: Blackbird Creek
  - location: Blackbird, Delaware
  - coordinates: 39°22′27″N 075°39′10″W
  - elevation: 0 ft (0 m)
- Length: 2.33 mi (3.75 km)
- Basin size: 2.78 square miles (7.2 km^{2})
- Discharge
  - location: Blackbird Creek
  - average: 3.28 cu ft/s (0.093 m^{3}/s) at mouth with Blackbird Creek

Basin features
- Progression: Blackbird Creek → Delaware Bay → Atlantic Ocean
- River system: Blackbird Creek
- Tributaries
  - left: unnamed tributaries
  - right: unnamed tributaries

Sandom Branch is a 2.33 mi (3.75 km) long tributary to Blackbird Creek in New Castle County, Delaware. Sandom Branch is one of the major tributaries to Blackbird Creek above tidal influence.

== Course ==
Sandom Branch rises on the Duck Creek divide about 2 miles south of Blackbird, Delaware.

== Watershed ==
Sandom Branch drains 2.78 square miles (7.2 km^{2}) of area, receives about 43.8 in/year of precipitation, has a topographic wetness index of 556.57 and is about 22.6% forested.

== See also ==
- List of Delaware rivers

== Maps ==
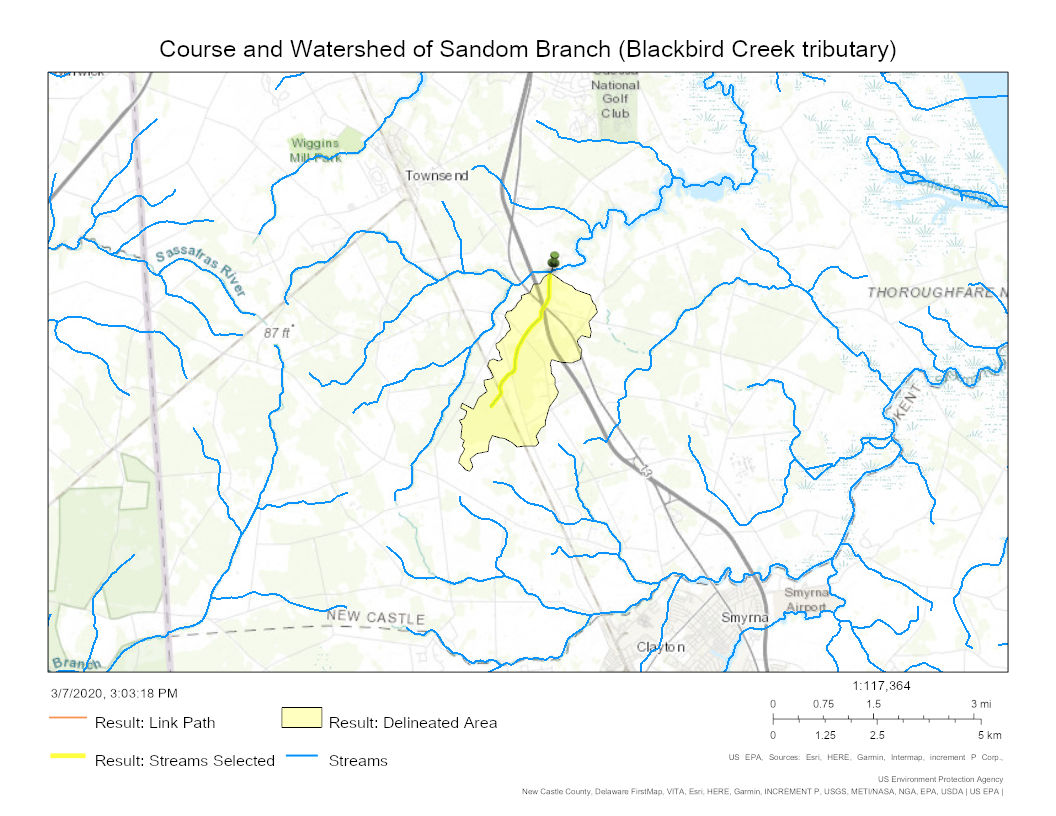
Course and Watershed of Sandom Branch (Blackbird Creek tributary)
