= Green Spring Branch (Duck Creek tributary) =

Green Spring Branch Tributary to Duck Creek
- Location within Delaware Location within the United States

Location
- Country: United States
- State: Delaware
- County: New Castle
- City: Smyrna

Physical characteristics
- Source: Sawmill Branch divide
  - location: about 1 northeast of Green Spring, Delaware
  - coordinates: 39°20′11″N 075°38′58″W
  - elevation: 50 ft (15 m)
- Mouth: Duck Creek (Duck Creek Pond)
  - location: Smyrna, Delaware
  - coordinates: 39°18′29″N 075°32′41″W
  - elevation: 0 ft (0 m)
- Length: 2.91 mi (4.68 km)
- Basin size: 4.22 square miles (10.9 km^{2})
- Discharge
  - average: 5.07 cu ft/s (0.144 m^{3}/s) at mouth with Duck Creek

Basin features
- Progression: southeast
- River system: Smyrna River
- Tributaries
  - left: unnamed tributaries
  - right: Massey Branch
- Bridges: Clark Farm Road, Vandyke Greenspring Road

Green Spring Branch is a 2.91 mi (4.68 km) long 2nd order tributary to Duck Creek in New Castle County, Delaware.

== Course ==
Green Spring Branch rises on the Sawmill Branch divide about 1 mile northeast of Green Spring, Delaware.

== Watershed ==
Green Spring Branch drains 4.22 square miles (10.9 km^{2}) of area, receives about 44.3 in/year of precipitation, has a topographic wetness index of 605.67 and is about 4.9% forested.

== See also ==
- List of rivers of Delaware
