= Seven Hickories, Delaware =

Unincorporated community in Delaware, United States

- Unincorporated community
- Location within Delaware Location within the United States
- Coordinates: 39°12′58″N 75°37′46″W
- Country: United States
- State: Delaware
- County: Kent
- Elevation: 49 ft (15 m)
- Time zone: UTC-5 (Eastern (EST))
  - Summer (DST): UTC-4 (EDT)
- Area code: 302
- GNIS feature ID: 216210

Seven Hickories is an unincorporated community in Kent County, Delaware, United States. Seven Hickories is at the intersection of Delaware Route 15 and Delaware Route 42, west of Cheswold and east of Kenton.
