= Corks Point Ditch =

Corks Point Ditch Tributary to Smyrna River
- Location within Delaware Location within the United States

Location
- Country: United States
- State: Delaware
- County: New Castle

Physical characteristics
- Source: Sawmill Branch divide
  - location: About 0.5 miles south of Tent, Delaware
  - coordinates: 39°20′59″N 075°36′11″W
  - elevation: 52 ft (16 m)
- Mouth: Smyrna River
  - location: about 2 miles east of Walker, Delaware
  - coordinates: 39°20′21″N 075°33′30″W
  - elevation: 0 ft (0 m)
- Length: 3.86 mi (6.21 km)
- Basin size: 7.29 square miles (18.9 km^{2})
- Discharge
  - average: 8.69 cu ft/s (0.246 m^{3}/s) at mouth with Smyrna River

Basin features
- Progression: south then northeast
- River system: Smyrna River
- Tributaries
  - left: unnamed tributaries
  - right: Morris Branch
- Bridges: Paddock Road, McQuail Road

Corks Point Ditch is a 3.86 mi (6.21 km) long 2nd order tributary to Smyrna River in New Castle County, Delaware.

== Variant names ==
According to the Geographic Names Information System, it has also been known historically as:

- Beaver Branch
- Morris Run

== Course ==
Corks Point Ditch rises the Sawmill Branch divide about 0.25 miles south of Tent in New Castle County, Delaware. Corks Point Ditch then flows south then northeast to meet the Smyrna River about 2 miles east of Walker, Delaware.

== Watershed ==
Corks Point Ditch drains 7.29 square miles (18.9 km^{2}) of area, receives about 44.4 in/year of precipitation, has a topographic wetness index of 594.01 and is about 13.0% forested.

== See also ==
- List of rivers of Delaware
