= Mill Creek (Blackbird Creek tributary) =

Mill Creek Tributary to Blackbird Creek
- Location within Delaware Location within the United States

Location
- Country: United States
- State: Delaware
- County: New Castle

Physical characteristics
- Source: Cedar Swamp divide
  - location: about 0.5 miles northeast of Taylors Bridge, Delaware
  - coordinates: 39°25′00″N 075°34′34″W
  - elevation: 0 ft (0 m)
- Mouth: Blackbird Creek
  - location: about 2 miles north-northeast of Taylors Bridge, Delaware
  - coordinates: 39°25′50″N 075°35′03″W
  - elevation: 0 ft (0 m)
- Length: 3.53 mi (5.68 km)
- Basin size: 1.61 square miles (4.2 km^{2})
- Discharge
  - average: 1.26 cu ft/s (0.036 m^{3}/s) at mouth with Appoquinimink River

Basin features
- Progression: Blackbird Creek → Delaware Bay → Atlantic Ocean
- River system: Blackbird Creek
- Tributaries
  - left: unnamed tributaries
  - right: unnamed tributaries

Mill Creek is a 2.19 mi (3.52 km) long 1st order tributary to Blackbird Creek in New Castle County, Delaware.

== Course ==
Mill Creek rises on the Cedar Swamp divide about 0.5 miles northeast of Taylors Bridge in New Castle County, Delaware. Mill Creek then flows north to meet Blackbird Creek about 2 miles north-northeast of Taylors Bridge, Delaware.

== Watershed ==
Mill Creek drains 1.61 square miles (4.2 km^{2}) of area, receives about 43.4 in/year of precipitation, has a topographic wetness index of 946.15 and is about 2.1% forested.

== See also ==
- List of rivers of Delaware
