= Bishops Corner, Delaware =

Unincorporated community in Delaware, United States

- Unincorporated community
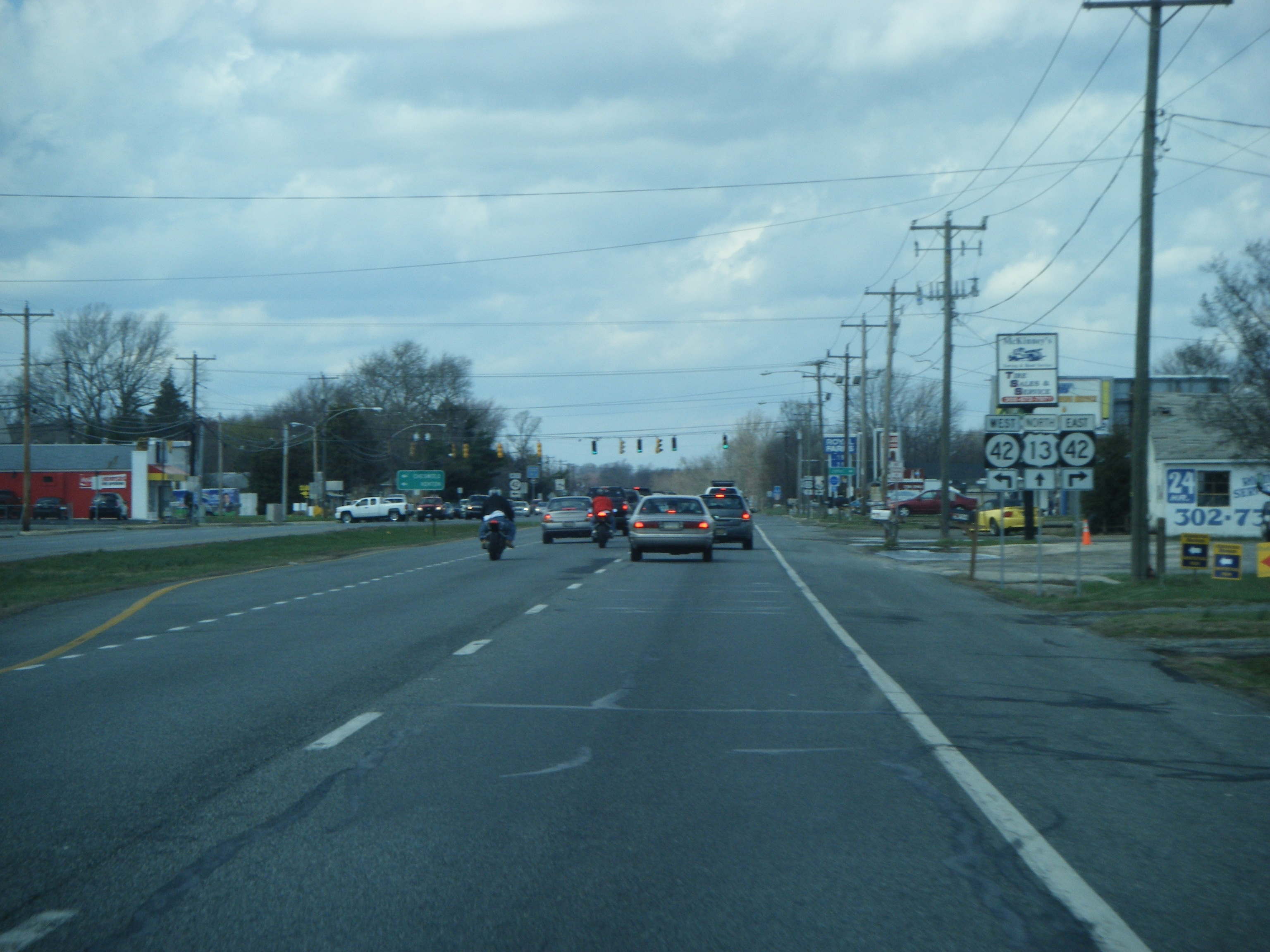
- Northbound U.S. Route 13 approaching Bishops Corner

- Location within Delaware Location within the United States
- Coordinates: 39°13′25″N 75°34′33″W
- Country: United States
- State: Delaware
- County: Kent
- Elevation: 43 ft (13 m)
- Time zone: UTC-5 (Eastern (EST))
  - Summer (DST): UTC-4 (EDT)
- Area code: 302
- GNIS feature ID: 216036

Bishops Corner is an unincorporated community in Kent County, Delaware, United States. Bishops Corner is located at the intersection of U.S. Route 13 and Delaware Route 42, east of Cheswold.
