= Beaver Branch (Blackbird Creek tributary) =

River on North America's Delmarva Peninsula

Beaver Branch Tributary to Blackbird Creek
- Location within Delaware Location within the United States

Location
- Country: United States
- State: Delaware
- County: New Castle

Physical characteristics
- Source: On divide between Beaver Branch and Appoquinimink River
  - location: Pine Tree Corners, Delaware
  - coordinates: 39°24′31″N 075°39′30″W
  - elevation: 55 ft (17 m)
- Mouth: Blackbird Creek
  - location: about 0.5 miles northeast of Blackbird Landing, Delaware
  - coordinates: 39°23′44″N 075°37′09″W
  - elevation: 0 ft (0 m)
- Length: 2.41 mi (3.88 km)
- Basin size: 2.24 square miles (5.8 km^{2})
- Discharge
  - location: Blackbird Creek
  - average: 2.55 cu ft/s (0.072 m^{3}/s) at mouth with Blackbird Creek

Basin features
- Progression: Blackbird Creek → Delaware Bay → Atlantic Ocean
- River system: Delaware River
- Tributaries
  - left: unnamed tributaries
  - right: unnamed tributaries
- Bridges: Union Church Road

Beaver Branch is a 2.41-mile-long (3.88 km) tributary to Blackbird Creek in southern New Castle County, Delaware in the United States.

== Course ==
Beaver Branch rises just east of Pine Tree Corners in southern New Castle County, Delaware and flows southeast to meet Blackbird Creek northeast of Blackbird Landing.

== Watershed ==
The Beaver Branch watershed is about 13% forested and 63% agricultural with the rest being other land uses. The watershed receives approximately 43.2 in/year of precipitation and has a topographic wetness index of 562.53.

== See also ==
- List of Delaware rivers

== Maps ==
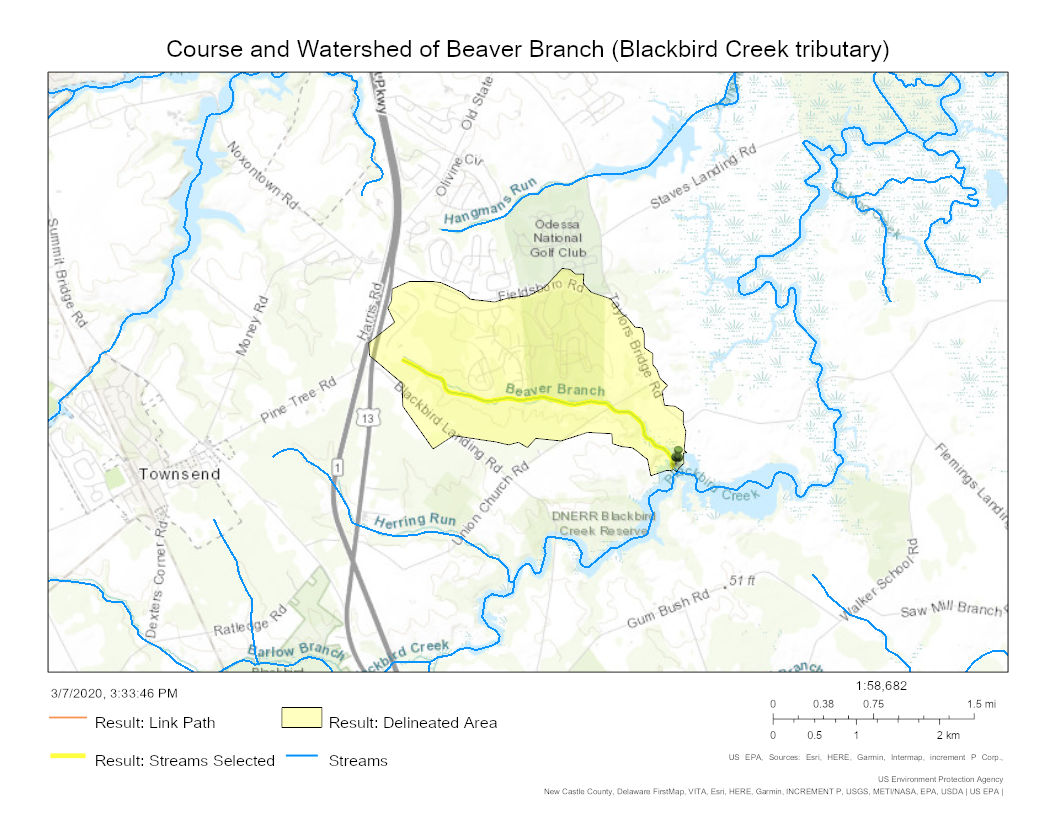
Course and Watershed of Beaver Branch (Blackbird Creek tributary) in New Castle County, Delaware.
