= Herring Run (Blackbird Creek tributary) =

Herring Run Tributary to Blackbird Creek
- Location within Delaware

Location
- Country: United States
- State: Delaware
- County: New Castle

Physical characteristics
- Source: On divide between Herring Run and Appoquinimink River
  - location: about 0.5 miles east of Townsend, Delaware
  - coordinates: 39°23′49″N 075°40′33″W
  - elevation: 70 ft (21 m)
- Mouth: Blackbird Creek
  - location: about 0.5 miles east of H&H Corner, Delaware
  - coordinates: 39°23′00″N 075°38′31″W
  - elevation: 0 ft (0 m)
- Length: 2.26 mi (3.64 km)
- Basin size: 10.29 square miles (26.7 km^{2})
- Discharge
  - location: Blackbird Creek
  - average: 2.42 cu ft/s (0.069 m^{3}/s) at mouth with Blackbird Creek

Basin features
- Progression: Blackbird Creek → Delaware Bay → Atlantic Ocean
- River system: Delaware River
- Tributaries
  - left: unnamed tributaries
  - right: unnamed tributaries
- Bridges: DE 1, US 13, Union Church Road

Herring Run is a 2.26-mile-long (3.64 km) tributary to Blackbird Creek in northern Delaware in the United States.

== Course ==
Herring Run rises east of Townsend in southern New Castle County, Delaware and flows southeast to meet Blackbird Creek east of H&H Corner.

== Watershed ==
The Herring Run watershed is about 26% forested and 64% agricultural with the rest being other land uses. The watershed receives approximately 43.4 in/year of precipitation and has a wetness index of 602.69.

== See also ==
- List of Delaware rivers

== Maps ==
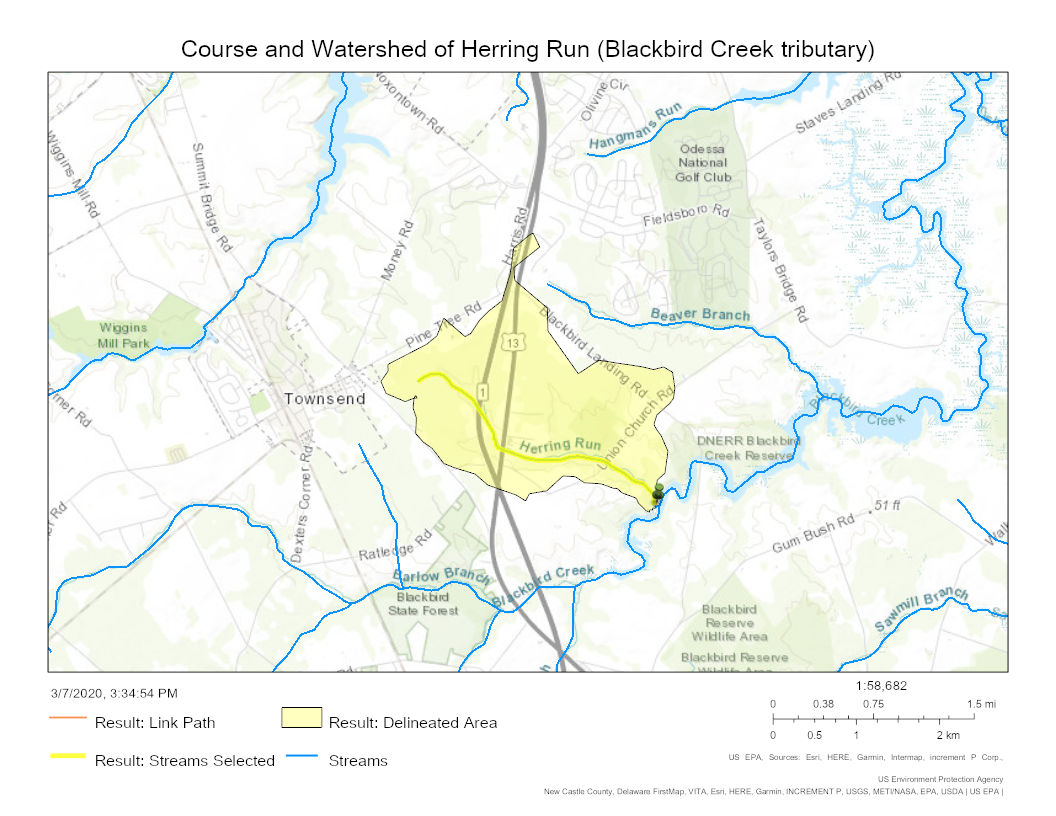
Course and Watershed of Herring Run (Blackbird Creek tributary) in New Castle County, Delaware
