= Drawyer Creek (Appoquinimink River tributary) =

Stream in Delaware, USA

Drawyer Creek Tributary to Appoquinimink River
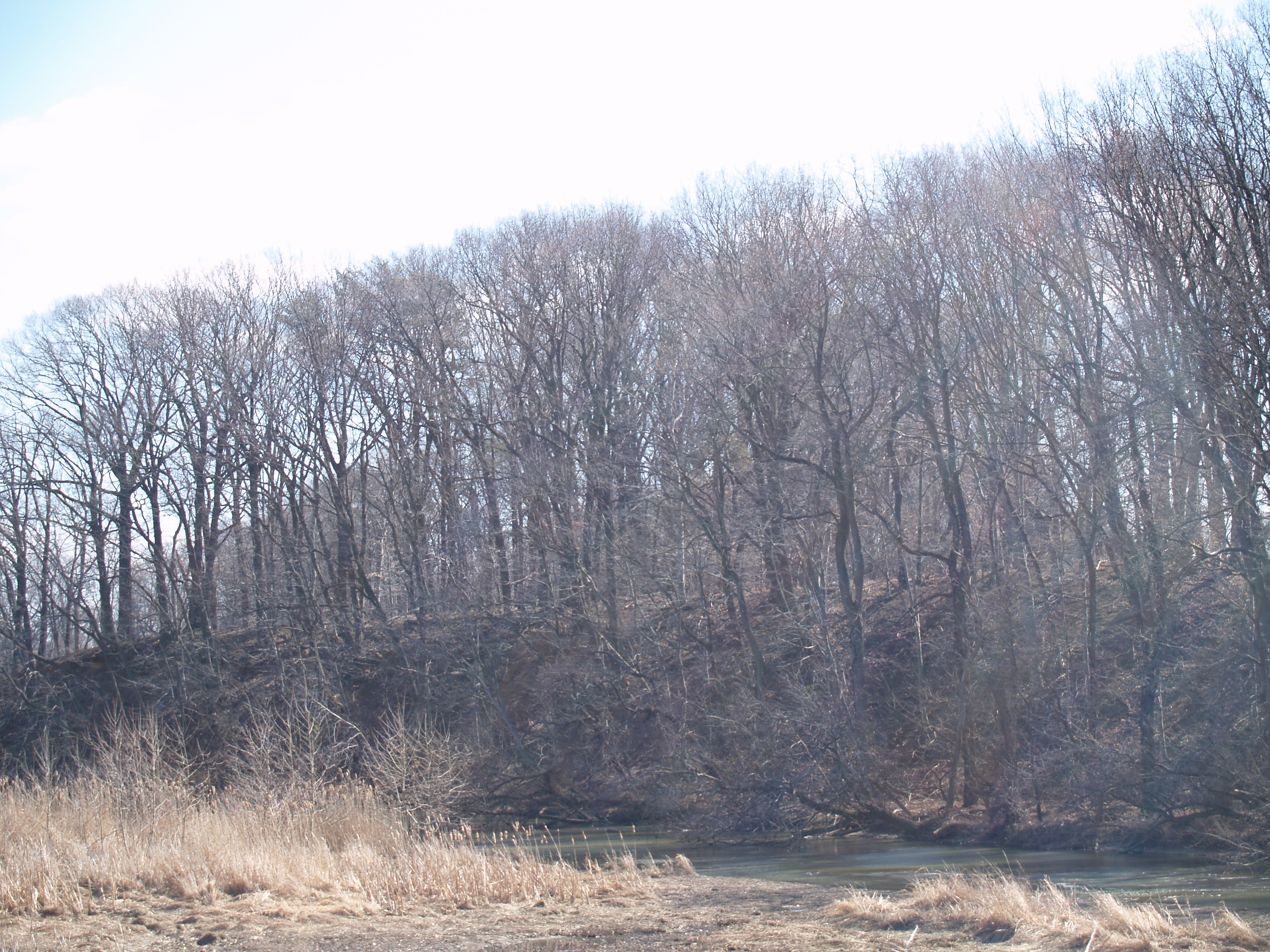
- Bluff above Drawyer Creek in 2008

- Location of mouth in Delaware Location of mouth in United States

Location
- Country: United States
- State: Delaware
- County: New Castle

Physical characteristics
- Source: divide between Drawyer Creek and Back Creek
  - location: Meadowbrook Farms, Delaware
  - coordinates: 39°30′13″N 075°42′19″W
  - elevation: 70 ft (21 m)
- Mouth: Delaware Bay
  - location: about 1 northeast of Odessa, Delaware
  - coordinates: 39°27′57″N 075°42′19″W
  - elevation: 0 ft (0 m)
- Length: 6.26 mi (10.07 km)
- Basin size: 15.56 square miles (40.3 km^{2})
- Discharge
  - location: Delaware Bay
  - average: 17.75 cu ft/s (0.503 m^{3}/s) at mouth with Delaware Bay

Basin features
- Progression: Appoquinimink River → Delaware Bay → Atlantic Ocean
- River system: Delaware Bay
- Tributaries
  - left: unnamed tributaries
  - right: unnamed tributaries

Drawyer Creek is a 6.26 mi (10.07 km) long tributary to the Appoquinimink River in New Castle County, Delaware. Drawyer Creek is a mostly tidal tributary to the Appoquinimink River and is non-tidal above Shallcross Lake. Old Drawyers Church, a historic church, is located to the south of the creek.

== See also ==
- List of Delaware rivers
