= Delaware Route 42 =

Highway in Delaware, United States

Delaware Route 42

Route information
- Maintained by DelDOT
- Length: 12.74 mi (20.50 km)
- Existed: 1936–present

Major junctions
- West end: DE 6 in Blackiston
- DE 300 in Kenton; DE 15 in Seven Hickories; US 13 in Cheswold
- East end: DE 9 in Leipsic

Location
- Country: United States
- State: Delaware
- Counties: Kent

Highway system
- Delaware State Route System; List; Byways
← DE 41	→ DE 44

Delaware Route 42 (DE 42) is a state highway in Kent County, Delaware. It runs 12.74 miles (20.50 km) from DE 6 in Blackiston east to DE 9 in Leipsic. DE 42 passes through rural areas along with the towns of Kenton and Cheswold. The route intersects DE 300 in Kenton, runs concurrent with DE 15 between Seven Hickories and Moores Corner, and crosses U.S. Route 13 (US 13) in Cheswold. The road was built as a state highway during the 1920s and 1930s. DE 42 was designated by 1936 between Kenton and Leipsic and extended to Blackiston by 1966.

== Route description ==
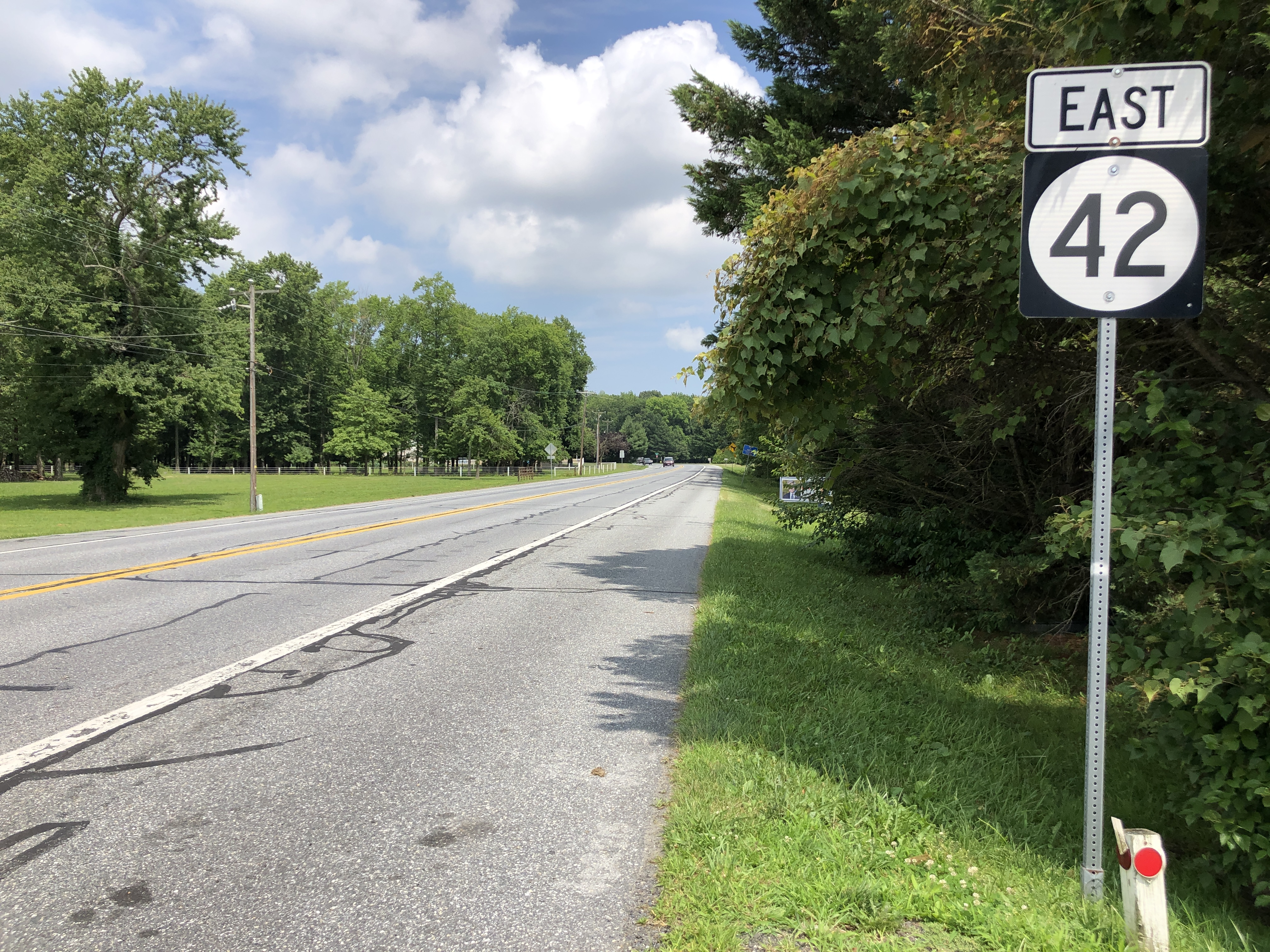
DE 42 eastbound past DE 15 in Moores Corner

DE 42 begins at an intersection with DE 6 in the community of Blackiston. Northwest of DE 6, the road becomes Longridge Road, which changes names to Delaney Maryland Line Road and Clayton Delaney Road before it reaches the Maryland border and becomes Maryland Route 330 (MD 330). MD 330 heads west and, by way of MD 313, provides access to US 301. From the western terminus, DE 42 heads southeast on two-lane undivided Blackiston Road. The route runs through agricultural areas with some woods and homes. The road reaches the town of Kenton, where it becomes Commerce Street. In Kenton, the route crosses an abandoned railroad line and passes residences and a few businesses, intersecting with DE 300 in the center of town.

Past Kenton, DE 42 heads to the east-southeast on Seven Hickories Road into farmland with woods and residences, crossing Pinks Branch. In Seven Hickories, the route intersects DE 15 and the two routes head east for a concurrency. In Moores Corner, DE 15 splits from DE 42 by turning southeast on Kenton Road before DE 42 continues east and intersects Pearsons Corner Road. The road heads east-northeast and passes to the south of Delaware Airpark. The route enters the town of Cheswold, where it becomes Main Street. The road passes homes and some businesses in the town, crossing the Delmarva Central Railroad's Delmarva Subdivision line at-grade. DE 42 reaches an intersection with US 13 on the eastern edge of Cheswold at Bishops Corner.

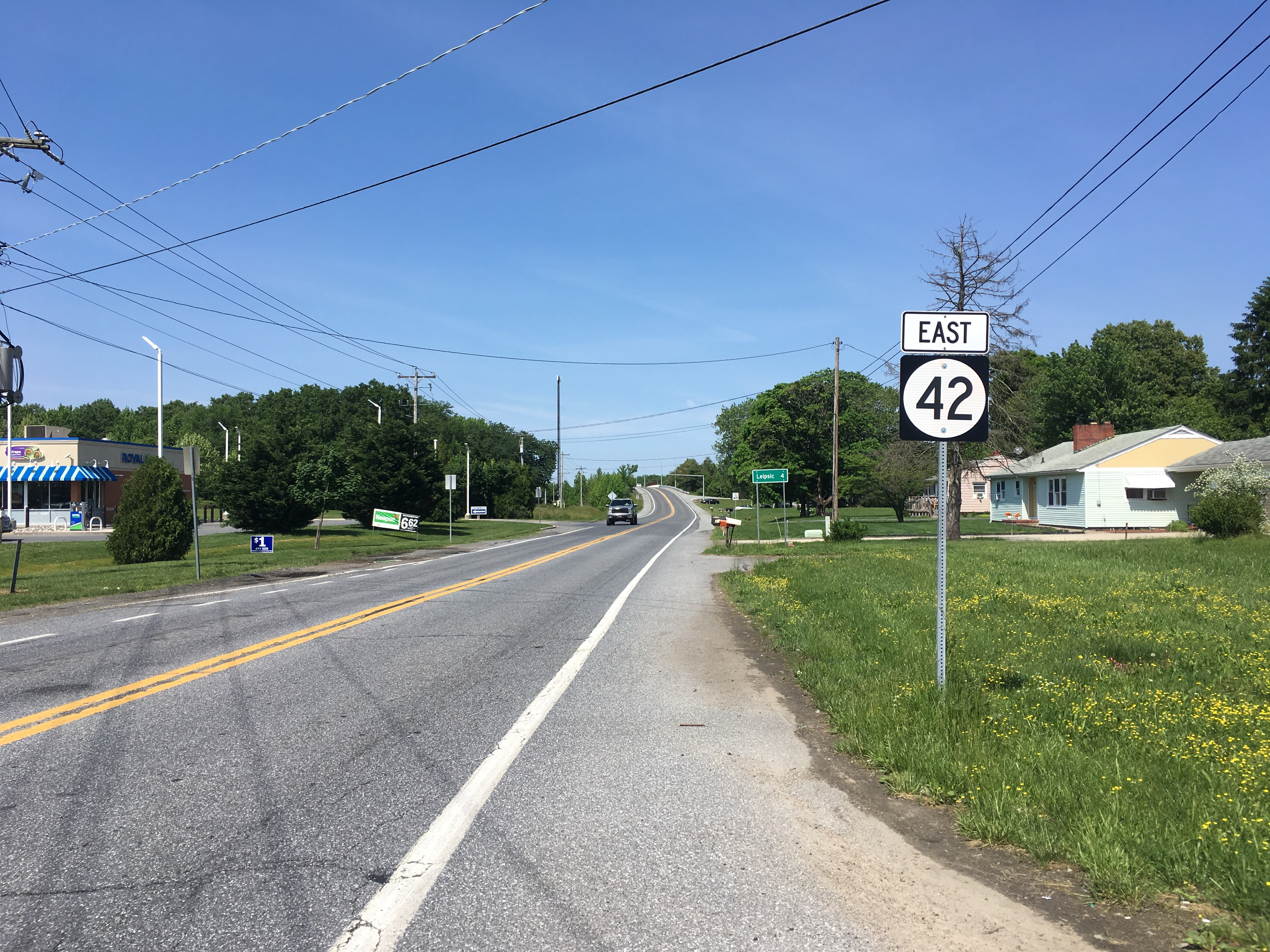
DE 42 eastbound past US 13 in Cheswold

After the US 13 intersection, the route heads northeast on Fast Landing Road. DE 42 passes over the DE 1 toll road, where it has ramps for emergency vehicles but no public access. The road runs through farmland with some woodland and homes, curving to the east. Farther east, the route turns southeast into marshland adjacent to the Leipsic River, crossing Dyke Branch. DE 42 enters the town of Leipsic, where it heads east into residential areas and ends at DE 9. Past the eastern terminus, the road continues east as Second Street.

DE 42 has an annual average daily traffic count ranging from a high of 7,654 vehicles at the eastern border of Cheswold to a low of 536 vehicles at the eastern terminus at DE 9.

== History ==
By 1920, what is now DE 42 existed as an unimproved county road. The road was completed as a state highway between Kenton and Lepisic four years later. The route was under construction as a state highway between Blackiston and Kenton by 1932. By 1936, DE 42 was assigned to its current alignment between DE 300 in Kenton and DE 9 in Leipsic and the state highway between Blackiston and Kenton was completed. By 1966, the route was extended to Blackiston.

== Major intersections ==
The entire route is in Kent County.

Location	mi	km	Destinations	Notes
Blackiston	0.00	0.00	DE 6 (Millington Road) – Millington, Clayton, Smyrna	Western terminus
Kenton	3.73	6.00	DE 300 (Main Street) – Smyrna, Hartly	
Seven Hickories	6.58	10.59	DE 15 north (Brenford Road)	West end of DE 15 overlap
Moores Corner	7.16	11.52	DE 15 south (Kenton Road)	East end of DE 15 overlap
Cheswold	8.83	14.21	US 13 (North Dupont Highway) – Smyrna, Dover	
Leipsic	12.74	20.50	DE 9 (Denny Street) – Woodland Beach, Little Creek	Eastern terminus
1.000 mi = 1.609 km; 1.000 km = 0.621 mi: Concurrency terminus
