= Fishing Creek (Blackbird Creek tributary) =

Fishing Creek Tributary to Blackbird Creek
- Location within Delaware Location within the United States

Location
- Country: United States
- State: Delaware
- County: New Castle

Physical characteristics
- Source: Cedar Swamp divide
  - location: about 0.5 miles north of Taylors Bridge, Delaware
  - coordinates: 39°24′49″N 075°35′18″W
  - elevation: 0 ft (0 m)
- Mouth: Blackbird Creek
  - location: about 2 miles north of Taylors Bridge, Delaware
  - coordinates: 39°25′44″N 075°35′50″W
  - elevation: 0 ft (0 m)
- Length: 1.44 mi (2.32 km)
- Basin size: 0.58 square miles (1.5 km^{2})
- Discharge
  - average: 0.65 cu ft/s (0.018 m^{3}/s) at mouth with Blackbird Creek

Basin features
- Progression: Blackbird Creek → Delaware Bay → Atlantic Ocean
- River system: Blackbird Creek
- Tributaries
  - left: unnamed tributaries
  - right: unnamed tributaries

Fishing Creek is a 2.19 mi (3.52 km) long 1st order tributary to Blackbird Creek in New Castle County, Delaware. This creek is entirely tidal for its course.

== Course ==
Fishing Creek rises on the Cedar Swamp divide about 0.5 miles north of Taylors Bridge in New Castle County, Delaware. Fishing Creek then flows northwest to meet Blackbird Creek about 2 miles north of Taylors Bridge, Delaware.

== Watershed ==
Fishing Creek drains 0.58 square miles (1.5 km^{2}) of area, receives about 43.3 in/year of precipitation, has a topographic wetness index of 792.29 and is about 4.7% forested.

== See also ==
- List of rivers of Delaware
