= Paw Paw Branch (Providence Creek tributary) =

Paw Paw Branch Tributary to Providence Creek
- Location within Delaware Location within the United States

Location
- Country: United States
- State: Delaware
- County: New Castle

Physical characteristics
- Source: Black Stallion Ditch divide
  - location: about 0.1 miles northeast of Reynolds Corners, Delaware
  - coordinates: 39°19′14″N 075°41′32″W
  - elevation: 75 ft (23 m)
- Mouth: Providence Creek
  - location: about 0.1 miles north of Clayton, Delaware
  - coordinates: 39°18′03″N 075°38′31″W
  - elevation: 13 ft (4.0 m)
- Length: 3.54 mi (5.70 km)
- Basin size: 4.71 square miles (12.2 km^{2})
- Discharge
  - average: 5.70 cu ft/s (0.161 m^{3}/s) at mouth with Providence Creek

Basin features
- Progression: southeast
- River system: Smyrna River
- Tributaries
  - left: unnamed tributaries
  - right: unnamed tributaries
- Bridges: Blackbird Forest Road, Alley Mill Road, Clayton-Delany Road

Paw Paw Branch is a 3.54 mi (5.70 km) long 2nd order tributary to Providence Creek in New Castle County, Delaware.

== Course ==
Paw Paw Branch rises on the Black Stallion Ditch divide about 0.1 miles northeast of Reynolds Corners, Delaware.

== Watershed ==
Paw Paw Branch drains 4.71 square miles (12.2 km^{2}) of area, receives about 44.4 inches per year (113 cm/year) of precipitation, has a topographic wetness index of 620.24 and is about 6.4% forested.

== See also ==
- List of rivers of Delaware
