= Taylors Bridge, Delaware =

Unincorporated community in Delaware, United States

- Unincorporated community
- Location within Delaware Location within the United States
- Coordinates: 39°24′22″N 75°35′21″W
- Country: United States
- State: Delaware
- County: New Castle
- Elevation: 10 ft (3.0 m)
- Time zone: UTC-5 (Eastern (EST))
  - Summer (DST): UTC-4 (EDT)
- Area code: 302
- GNIS feature ID: 214722

Taylors Bridge is an unincorporated community in Appoquinimink Hundred and Blackbird Hundred, New Castle County, Delaware, United States. Taylors Bridge is located on Delaware Route 9, 7.4 miles (11.9 km) east-southeast of Middletown. It is named for the bridge that carries Route 9 over the Blackbird Creek, the boundary between the two hundreds.
