= Appoquinimink Hundred =

Administrative subdivision in Delaware, United States

Appoquinimink Hundred is an unincorporated subdivision of New Castle County, Delaware. Hundreds were once used as a basis for representation in the Delaware General Assembly, and while their names still appear on all real estate transactions, they presently have no meaningful use or purpose except as a geographical point of reference.

== Boundaries and formation ==
Appoquinimink Hundred is that portion of New Castle County that lies south of Creek, extended generally westward from its headwaters to the Maryland state line, and north of Blackbird Creek and Cypress Creek, a tributary of the Chester River. It was one of the original hundreds in Delaware created in 1682 and was named for Appoquinimink Creek that flows along its northern boundary. When created it included the area now in Blackbird Hundred, which was split off in 1875.

Originally, the default boundary of Delaware and Maryland was the vague height of land between the Delaware River and Chesapeake Bay drainage basins and Appoquinimink Hundred extended only to that point. With the running of the Mason–Dixon line in 1767, the western boundary of Delaware was established in its present location and became Appoquinimink Hundred's western boundary. The town of Townsend and a portion of the town of Middletown are in the hundred.

== Development ==
Appoquinimink Hundred remains largely rural and agricultural, but there is significant development beginning around Townsend and Middletown.

== Geography ==
The important geographical features of the hundred, in addition to Appoquinimink Creek and Blackbird Creek, include the Delaware River, which forms its eastern boundary, Noxontown Pond, and the headwaters of the Sassafras River. It is entirely in the coastal plain region on the Delmarva Peninsula.

== Transportation ==
Important roads include portions of the Korean War Veterans Memorial Highway (Delaware Route 1), the DuPont Highway (U.S. Route 13), the Townsend Road (Delaware Route 71), Augustine Beach Road and Taylor's Bridge Road (Delaware Route 9). A portion of the old Delaware Railroad, subsequently the Delmarva branch of the Pennsylvania Railroad, now the Delmarva Central Railroad's Delmarva Subdivision, runs north–south through Townsend, and Middletown, and a portion of the Maryland & Delaware Railroad's Northern Line runs west from Townsend.

== See also ==
- List of Delaware Hundreds
