= Delaware National Estuarine Research Reserve =

- IUCN category IV (habitat/species management area)
- Location within Delaware
- Location: Kent County, Delaware, Delaware, United States
- Coordinates: 39°05′33″N 75°26′44″W
- Established: 1937
- Visitors: Open daily
- Website: Delaware National Estuarine Research Reserve

The Delaware National Estuarine Research Reserve consists of two unique components, one on Blackbird Creek (39°23′47″N 75°37′04″W) and the other on the St. Jones River (39°05′33″N 75°26′44″W). Freshwater wetlands, ponds and forest lands dominate the Blackbird Creek component. The St. Jones component is dominated by salt marsh and open water habitats of the Delaware Bay.

The reserve monitors long-term changes in weather and aquatic conditions in the estuary. The reserve’s research and monitoring programs address key management issues, such as biodiversity and the impacts of land use on estuarine habitats, ecological impacts on horseshoe crab populations from migratory shorebirds, beach replenishment activities in relation to habitat preservation/ reclamation, and eutrophication and contaminants in the estuary.

== St. Jones Center for Estuarine Studies ==
The St. Jones Center for Estuarine Studies offers a wide variety of educational programs about the reserve for the general public, school groups, private and nonprofit organizations, educators and coastal decision makers. Coastal decision-maker workshops have included such topics as land-use planning and smart growth, energy resource conservation and development for the next decade and acoustical bay bottom mapping. Visitor can explore hands-on interactive activities and exhibits including fish tanks, a recycling center, restoration demonstration areas as well as a variety of programs and volunteer opportunities for the community, teachers, students, and families. The Center also supports ongoing research and monitoring, field studies, citizen monitoring programs, and training opportunities for coastal decision makers.
