= Duck Creek (Smyrna River tributary) =

Duck Creek Tributary to Smyrna River
- Location within Delaware Location within the United States

Location
- Country: United States
- State: Delaware
- County: New Castle; Kent
- City: Smyrna

Physical characteristics
- Source: Duck Creek Pond at the confluence of Green Spring Branch and Providence Creek
  - location: Smyrna, Delaware
  - coordinates: 39°18′28″N 075°37′22″W
  - elevation: 10 ft (3.0 m)
- Mouth: Smyrna River
  - location: about 1 mile northeast of Smyrna, Delaware
  - coordinates: 39°18′46″N 075°34′29″W
  - elevation: 0 ft (0 m)
- Length: 3.86 mi (6.21 km)
- Basin size: 23.13 square miles (59.9 km^{2})
- Discharge
  - average: 27.89 cu ft/s (0.790 m^{3}/s) at mouth with Smyrna River

Basin features
- Progression: east
- River system: Smyrna River
- Tributaries
  - left: Green Spring Branch
  - right: Providence Creek; Greens Branch
- Bridges: Duck Creek Road, US 13, DE 1, Smyrna Landing Road

Duck Creek is a 3.86 mi (6.21 km) long 3rd order tributary to Smyrna River in New Castle County, Delaware.

== Variant names ==
According to the Geographic Names Information System, it has also been known historically as:

- Ancke Kijhlen
- Ende Kil
- Green Branch
- Old Duck Creek
- Quinquingo Cipus
- Smyrna River

== Course ==
Duck Creek is formed in Duck Creek Pond at the confluence of Green Spring Branch and Providence Creek at Smyrna, Delaware. Duck Creek then flows east to form the Smyrna River with Mill Creek about one mile (1.6 km) northeast of Smyrna, Delaware.

== Watershed ==
Duck Creek drains 23.13 square miles (59.9 km^{2}) of area, receives about 44.5 in (1,130 mm) per year of precipitation, has a topographic wetness index of 611.58 and is about 3.4% forested.

== See also ==
- List of rivers of Delaware
