= Barlow Branch (Blackbird Creek tributary) =

Stream in Delaware, USA

Barlow Branch Tributary to Blackbird Creek
- Location of Barlow Branch mouth Barlow Branch (Blackbird Creek tributary) (the United States)

Location
- Country: United States
- State: Delaware
- County: New Castle

Physical characteristics
- Source: divide between Barlow Branch and Sassafras River
  - location: just north of Ebenezer Church
  - coordinates: 39°22′06″N 075°43′36″W
  - elevation: 75 ft (23 m)
- Mouth: Blackbird Creek
  - location: Blackbird, Delaware
  - coordinates: 39°22′20″N 075°39′47″W
  - elevation: 2 ft (0.61 m)
- Length: 1.98 mi (3.19 km)
- Basin size: 7.6 square miles (20 km^{2})
- Discharge
  - location: Blackbird Creek
  - average: 8.89 cu ft/s (0.252 m^{3}/s) at mouth with Blackbird Creek

Basin features
- Progression: Blackbird Creek → Delaware Bay → Atlantic Ocean
- River system: Blackbird Creek
- Tributaries
  - left: unnamed tributaries
  - right: unnamed tributaries

Barlow Branch is a 1.98 mi (3.19 km) long tributary to Blackbird Creek in New Castle County, Delaware. Barlow Branch is one of the major tributaries to Blackbird Creek above tidal influence.

== Course ==
Barlow Branch rises on the Sassafras River divide just north of Ebenezer Church, Delaware.

== Watershed ==
Barlow Branch drains 7.60 square miles (19.7 km^{2}) of area, receives about 43.6 in/year of precipitation, has a topographic wetness index of 602.79 and is about 22.5% forested.

== See also ==
- List of Delaware rivers

== Maps ==
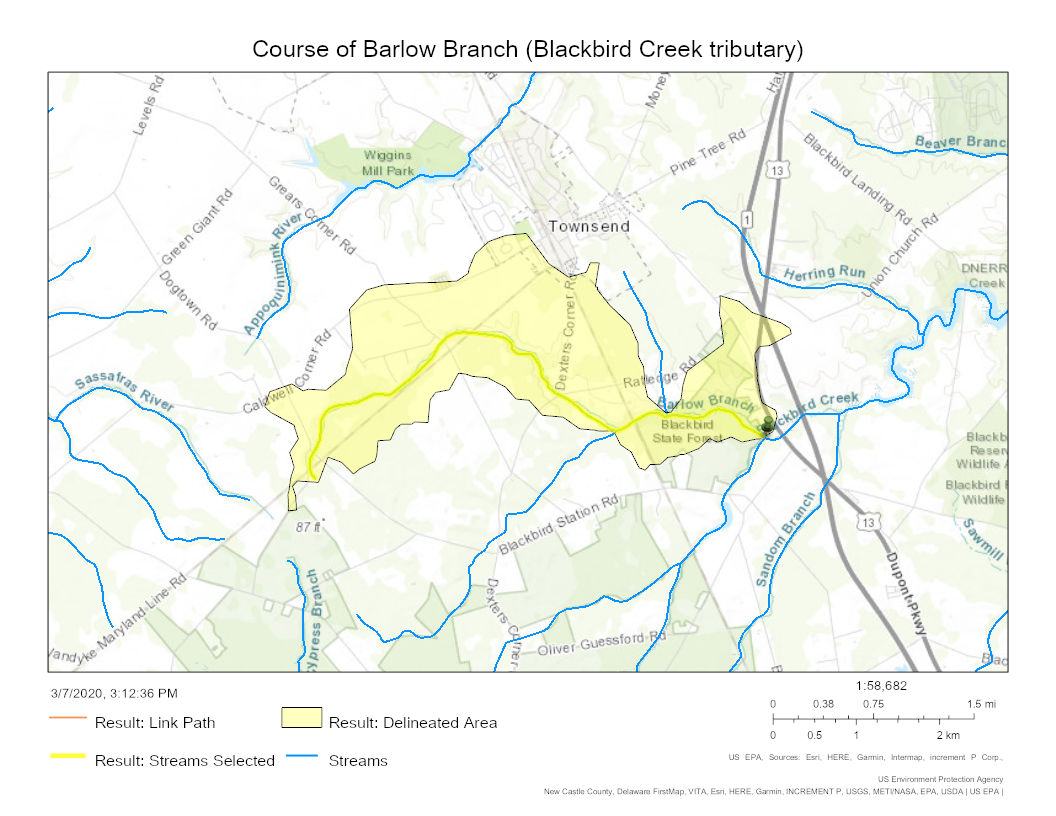
Course of Barlow Branch (Blackbird Creek tributary) in New Castle County, Delaware

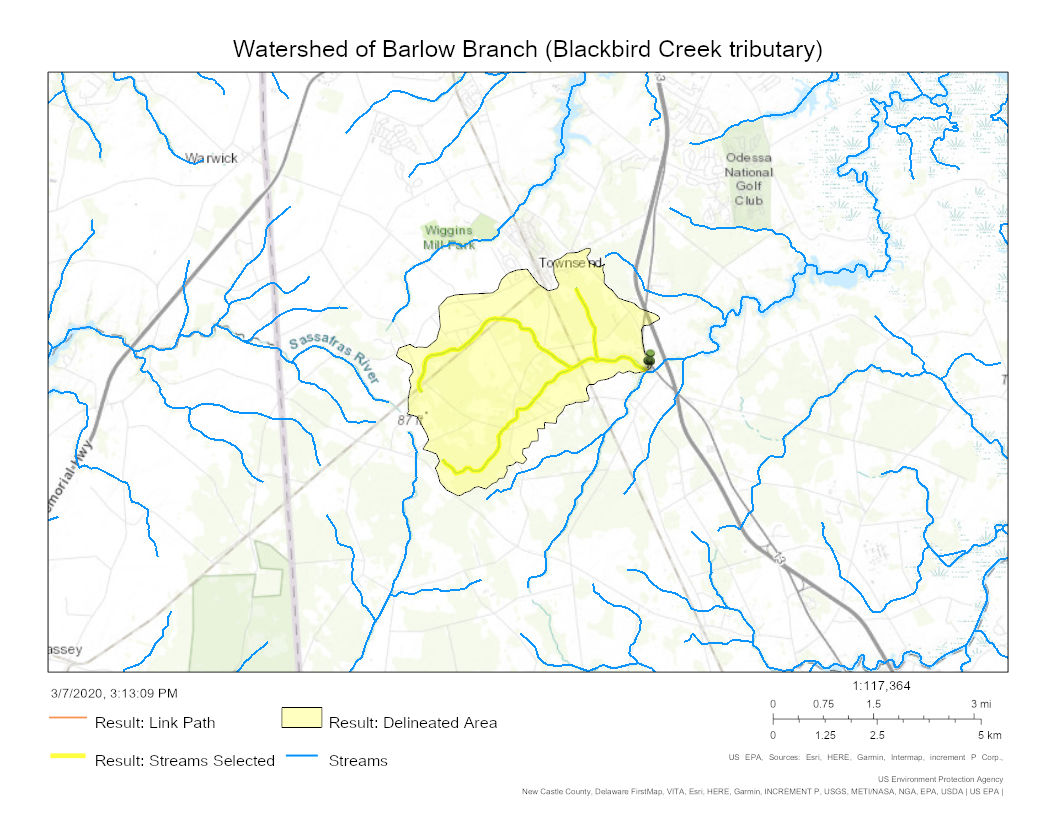
Watershed of Barlow Branch (Blackbird Creek tributary) in New Castle County, Delaware
