= Moores Corner, Delaware =

Unincorporated community in Delaware, United States

- Unincorporated community
- Location within Delaware Location within the United States
- Coordinates: 39°12′34″N 75°36′20″W
- Country: United States
- State: Delaware
- County: Kent
- Elevation: 56 ft (17 m)
- Time zone: UTC-5 (Eastern (EST))
  - Summer (DST): UTC-4 (EDT)
- Area code: 302
- GNIS feature ID: 216159

Moores Corner is an unincorporated community in Kent County, Delaware, United States. Moores Corner is located at the intersection of Delaware Route 15 and Pearsons Corner Road, west of Cheswold.
