= Blackbird Hundred =

Administrative subdivision in Delaware, United States

Blackbird Hundred is an unincorporated subdivision of New Castle County, Delaware. Hundreds were once used as a basis for representation in the Delaware General Assembly, and while their names still appear on all real estate transactions, they now have no purpose except as a geographical point of reference.

== Boundaries and Formation ==
Blackbird Hundred is that portion of New Castle County that lies south of Blackbird Creek and Cypress Creek, a tributary of the Chester River. Very small portions of the towns of Smyrna and Clayton, both primarily in Kent County, are the only towns or named communities in Blackbird Hundred. It was formed from Appoquinimink Hundred in 1875 and was named for Blackbird Creek that flows along its northern boundary.

== Development ==
Blackbird Hundred remains mostly rural.

== Geography ==
Important geographical features, in addition to Blackbird Creek, include the Delaware River, which forms its eastern boundary, the Smyrna River, formerly known as Duck Creek, which forms its southern boundary, and the North West Branch of the Smyrna River. It is entirely in the coastal plain region on the Delmarva Peninsula.

== Transportation ==
Important roads include portions of the Korean War Veterans Memorial Highway (Delaware Route 1), the DuPont Highway (U.S. Route 13), and the Thoroughfare Neck Road (Delaware Route 9). A portion of the old Delaware Railroad, subsequently the Delmarva branch of the Pennsylvania Railroad, now the Delmarva Central Railroad's Delmarva Subdivision, runs north–south through the hundred.
