= Sawmill Branch (Smyrna River tributary) =

Sawmill Branch Tributary to Smyrna River
- Location within Delaware Location within the United States

Location
- Country: United States
- State: Delaware
- County: New Castle

Physical characteristics
- Source: Blackbird Creek divide
  - location: Pond about 0.5 miles east-southeast of Blackbird, Delaware
  - coordinates: 39°21′46″N 075°38′26″W
  - elevation: 55 ft (17 m)
- Mouth: Smyrna River
  - location: about 1.5 miles southeast of Chambersville, Delaware
  - coordinates: 39°20′55″N 075°33′27″W
  - elevation: 0 ft (0 m)
- Length: 7.28 mi (11.72 km)
- Basin size: 10.24 square miles (26.5 km^{2})
- Discharge
  - average: 12.00 cu ft/s (0.340 m^{3}/s) at mouth with Smyrna River

Basin features
- Progression: southeast
- River system: Smyrna River
- Tributaries
  - left: unnamed tributaries
  - right: unnamed tributaries
- Bridges: DE 1, Black Diamond Road, Eagles Nest Landing Road, Deer Run Road, Walker School Road, Paddock Road

Sawmill Branch is a 7.28 mi (11.72 km) long 2nd order tributary to Smyrna River in New Castle County, Delaware.

== Variant names ==
According to the Geographic Names Information System, it has also been known historically as:

- Northwest Branch

== Course ==
Sawmill Branch rises in a pond on the Blackbird Creek divide about 1.5 miles southeast of Blackbird in New Castle County, Delaware. Sawmill Branch then flows southeast to meet the Smyrna River about 1.5 miles southeast of Chambersville, Delaware.

== Watershed ==
Sawmill Branch drains 10.24 square miles (26.5 km^{2}) of area, receives about 44.0 in/year of precipitation, has a topographic wetness index of 589.76 and is about 18.8% forested.

== See also ==
- List of rivers of Delaware
