= Providence Creek (Duck Creek tributary) =

Providence Creek Tributary to Duck Creek
- Location within Delaware Location within the United States

Location
- Country: United States
- State: Delaware
- County: New Castle; Kent
- City: Smyrna

Physical characteristics
- Source: Cypress Branch divide
  - location: about 0.5 miles southwest of Thomas Corners, Delaware
  - coordinates: 39°17′57″N 075°41′40″W
  - elevation: 70 ft (21 m)
- Mouth: Duck Creek (Duck Creek Pond)
  - location: Smyrna, Delaware
  - coordinates: 39°18′15″N 075°37′40″W
  - elevation: 10 ft (3.0 m)
- Length: 4.67 mi (7.52 km)
- Basin size: 13.75 square miles (35.6 km^{2})
- Discharge
  - average: 15.71 cu ft/s (0.445 m^{3}/s) at mouth with Duck Creek

Basin features
- Progression: northeast
- River system: Smyrna River
- Tributaries
  - left: Paw Paw Branch
  - right: unnamed tributaries
- Bridges: Blackbird Forest Road, Alley Mill Road, DE 15

Providence Creek is a 4.67 mi (7.52 km) long 3rd order tributary to Duck Creek in New Castle County, Delaware.

== Course ==
Providence Creek rises on the Cypress Branch divide about 0.5 miles southwest of Thomas Corners, Delaware.

== Watershed ==
Providence Creek drains 13.75 square miles (35.6 km^{2}) of area, receives about 44.5 in/year of precipitation, has a topographic wetness index of 604.98 and is about 3.6% forested.

== See also ==
- List of rivers of Delaware
