= Mill Creek (Smyrna River tributary) =

Mill Creek Tributary to Smyrna River
- Location within Delaware Location within the United States

Location
- Country: United States
- State: Delaware
- County: Kent
- City: Smyrna

Physical characteristics
- Source: Sewell Branch divide
  - location: about 0.25 miles east of Underwood Corners, Delaware
  - coordinates: 39°14′41″N 075°40′11″W
  - elevation: 45 ft (14 m)
- Mouth: Smyrna River
  - location: about 1 mile northeast of Smyrna, Delaware
  - coordinates: 39°20′05″N 075°35′07″W
  - elevation: 0 ft (0 m)
- Length: 8.97 mi (14.44 km)
- Basin size: 12.63 square miles (32.7 km^{2})
- Discharge
  - average: 15.38 cu ft/s (0.436 m^{3}/s) at mouth with Smyrna River

Basin features
- Progression: generally northeast
- River system: Smyrna River
- Tributaries
  - left: unnamed tributaries
  - right: unnamed tributaries
- Waterbodies: Lake Como
- Bridges: Underwoods Corner Road, Alley Corner Road, DE 300, Carter Road, US 13, DE 1, DE 6

Mill Creek is a 8.97 mi (14.44 km) long 3rd order tributary to Smyrna River in Kent County, Delaware.

== Course ==
Mill Creek rises on the Sewell Branch divide about 0.25 miles east of Underwood Corners in Kent County. Mill Creek then flows northeast to meet the Smyrna River about 1 mile northeast of Smyrna, Delaware.

== Watershed ==
Mill Creek drains 12.63 square miles (32.7 km^{2}) of area, receives about 44.9 in/year of precipitation, has a topographic wetness index of 631.41 and is about 2.1% forested.

== See also ==
- List of rivers of Delaware
