= Blackbird Creek (Delaware) =

River in northern Delaware, United States

Blackbird Creek Tributary to Delaware Bay
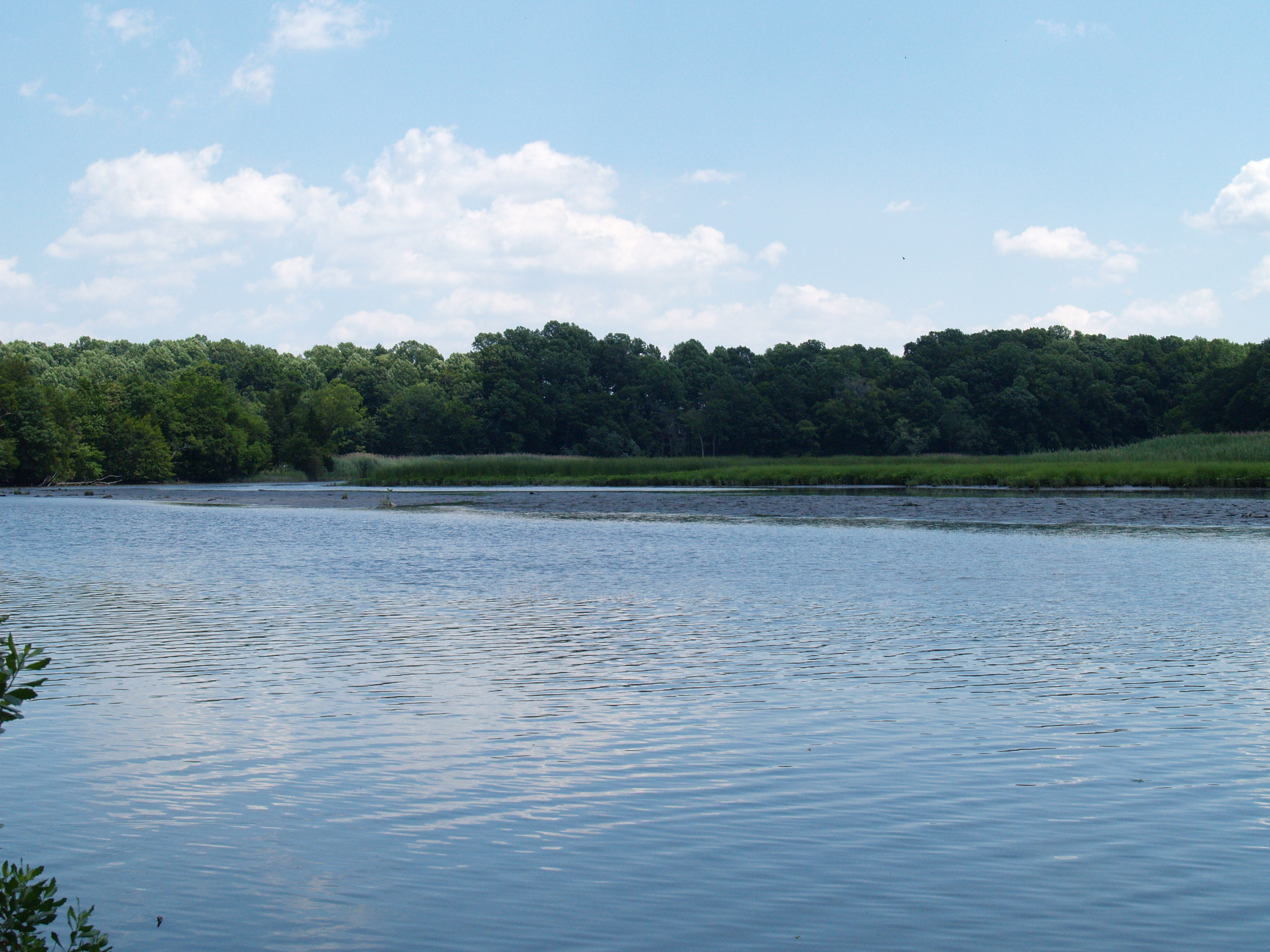
- Blackbird Creek at Blackbird Reserve

- Location within Delaware Location within the United States

Location
- Country: United States
- State: Delaware
- County: New Castle
- City: Townsend

Physical characteristics
- Source: On the watershed divide between Blackbird Creek and the Chester River
  - location: Dexter Corners, Delaware
  - coordinates: 39°19′25″N 075°41′46″W
  - elevation: 75 ft (23 m)
- Mouth: 2 miles north of Taylors Bridge, Delaware
  - location: Taylors Bridge, Delaware
  - coordinates: 39°26′19″N 075°34′27″W
  - elevation: 0 ft (0 m)
- Length: 16.28 mi (26.20 km)
- Basin size: 8,022 ha

Basin features
- Progression: Delaware Bay → Atlantic Ocean
- River system: Delaware River
- Tributaries
  - left: Barlow Branch; Herring Run; Beaver Branch
  - right: Sandom Branch; Fishing Creek; Mill Creek; Gravel Gut
- Waterbodies: Blackbird Pond
- Bridges: Greenspring Road; Oliver Guessford Road; Railroad Crossing; Blackbird Station Road; US 13; Blackbird Landing Road; DE 9

Blackbird Creek is a 16.9-mile-long (27.2 km) river in northern Delaware in the United States.

== Course ==
Blackbird Creek Reserve is on the Delaware Bayshore Byway and includes trails, pavilion and canoe/kayak launch. The reserve boasts several miles of trails through uplands and along the marsh, restoration demonstration areas as well as a variety of programs and volunteer opportunities for the community, teachers, students, and families. Blackbird Creek rises in two branches both north and south of Dexter Corners in southern New Castle County, Delaware and flows generally northeast in a meandering course. The northerly branch is contained within Blackbird State Forest, while the southerly branch arises in a swampy wooded buffer in farmland. Both branches join just upstream of Blackbird Pond, which is southwest of the village of Blackbird, Delaware. Just downstream of Blackbird Pond and upstream of US 13, Barlow Branch enters from the left (north). Downstream of US 13, Sandom Branch enters from the right (south) and a little further downstream, Blackbird Creek becomes subject to tidal influence and widens considerably.

Upstream of Blackbird Landing Road, Herring Run enters from the left (north) in an area of freshwater tidal marsh. Downstream of Blackbird Landing Road, another tributary, Beaver Branch, enters from the left (north). Near the mouth of Blackbird Creek, three tidal tributaries enter from the right (south) and include Fishing Creek, Mill Creek, and Gravel Gut. The mouth of Blackbird Creek is located at the north end of Delaware Bay approximately 0.25 miles (0.40 km) south of the mouth of the Appoquinimink River and approximately 2 miles (3.2 km) north of Taylors Bridge.

== Watershed ==
Blackbird Creek watershed is largely forested and rural. Near its mouth, it is surrounded by extensive salt marshes, with extensive populations of saltmarsh cordgrass (Spartina alterniflora) and common reed (Phragmites australis). The lower river upstream from Delaware State Highway 9 is protected as part of the Delaware National Estuarine Research Reserve, along with portions of the lower Appoquinimink. Blackbird State Forest covers large areas of the headwaters. One small village, Blackbird, is located totally within the watershed, while the city of Townsend is on the northern edge.

== River Modifications ==
Blackbird Pond, a former millpond, is the only dam present on Blackbird Creek.

The damming of this creek was the subject of the 1829 Supreme Court case that gave rise to the theory of the Dormant Commerce Clause.

== Natural history ==
The Blackbird Creek watershed is a focus area in Delaware for “Delmarva Bays”, which are undrained depression deposits that may or may not have a sandy rim. These “bays” have fluctuating hydrology that provide breeding sites for amphibians and habitat for a number of rare plants. Larger versions are generally called “Carolina Bays.”

== Geology ==
Blackbird Creek is located in the High Coastal Plain that originates from glacial outwash of continental deposits (Columbia Formation). The headwaters of Blackbird Creek are located in an area of undrained depression deposits of the Columbia Formation. The northeasterly course of Blackbird Creek takes it through the Lynch Heights Formation, Scotts Corners Formation, and into marsh deposits forming steep valleys along the way.

== See also ==
- List of Delaware rivers
- Willson v. Black-Bird Creek Marsh Co.: U.S. Supreme Court case on navigating the creek

== Maps ==
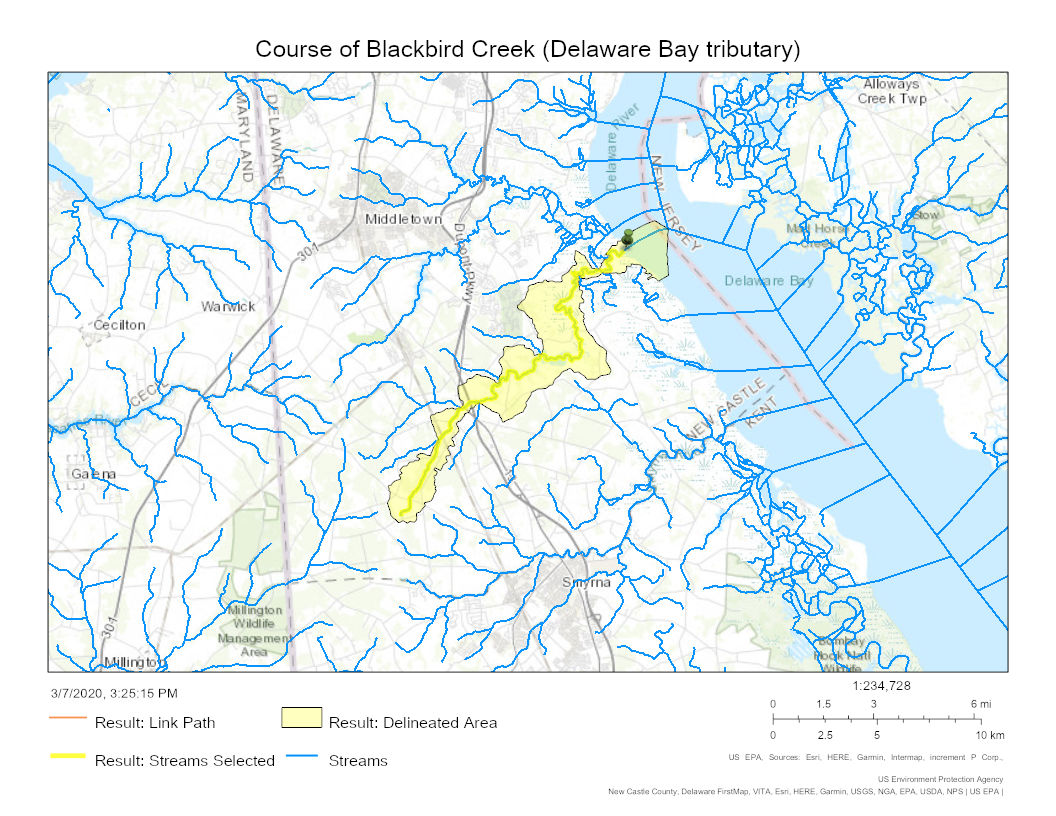
Course of Blackbird Creek (Delaware Bay tributary) in New Castle County, Delaware

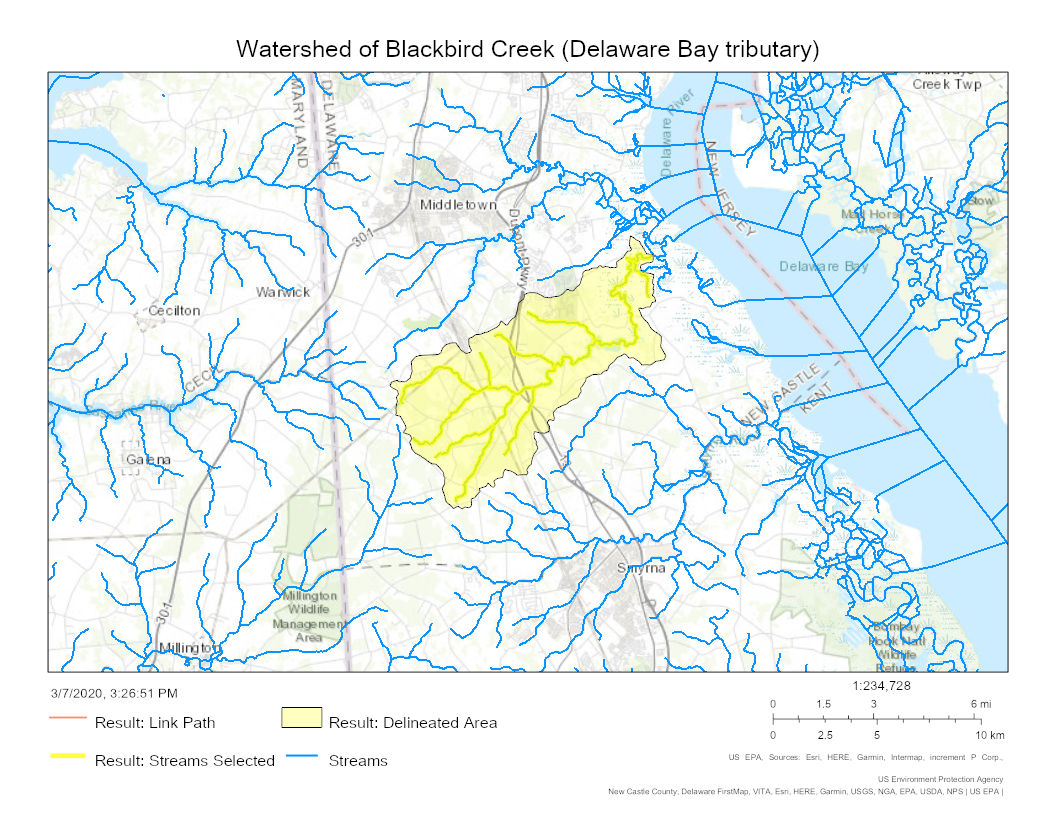
Watershed of Blackbird Creek (Delaware Bay tributary) in New Castle County, Delaware
