= Blackbird, Delaware =

Unincorporated community in Delaware, United States

- Unincorporated community
- Location within Delaware Location within the United States
- Coordinates: 39°22′15″N 75°39′33″W
- Country: United States
- State: Delaware
- County: New Castle
- Elevation: 46 ft (14 m)
- Time zone: UTC-5 (Eastern (EST))
  - Summer (DST): UTC-4 (EDT)
- Area code: 302
- GNIS feature ID: 216038

Blackbird is an unincorporated community in New Castle County, Delaware, United States. Blackbird is located at the intersection of U.S. Route 13 and Blackbird Station Road, southeast of Townsend. The Blackbird State Forest is nearby.

The community was originally a stagecoach stop along the King's Highway and was settled around a mill at the head of the Blackbird Creek. The name is believed to have originally been Blackbeard after the pirate Blackbeard, who, according to tradition, used the lower part of the Blackbird Creek as a harbor and stored booty along its banks.
