= Blackbird State Forest =

Forest in Delaware

Coordinates: 39°20′31″N 75°40′58″W

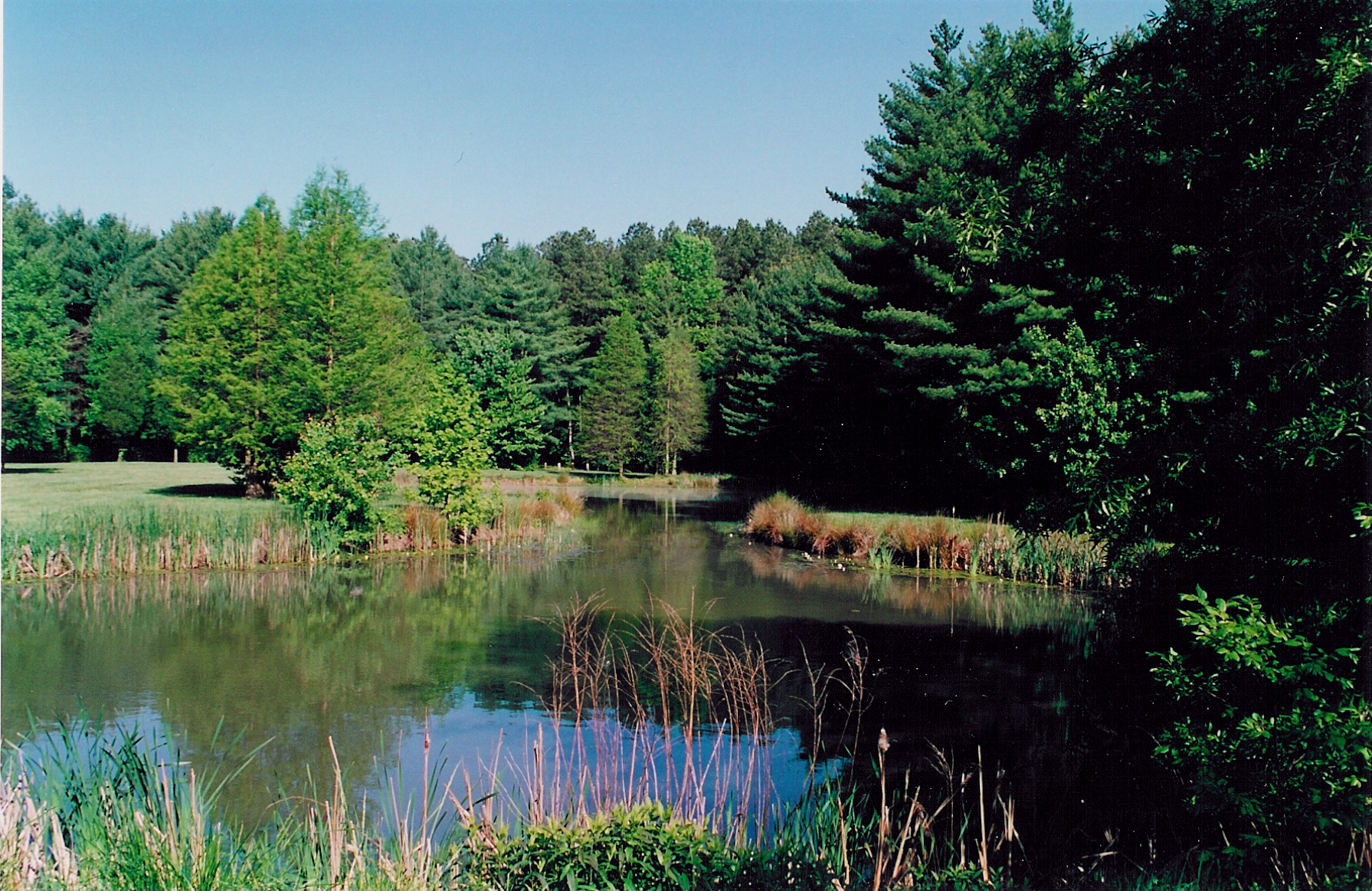
Blackbird Pond is located on the Meadows Tract of Blackbird State Forest in New Castle County, Delaware

Blackbird State Forest is a 6,000-acre (24 km^{2}) state forest of Delaware located in New Castle County and Kent County, north of Smyrna. The ten tracts of Blackbird State Forest feature 40 mi (64 km) of trails and are open to the public year-round for walking, hiking, running, cycling, and horseback riding. The Tybout Tract features a 2,200-foot (670 m), wheelchair-accessible wildlife and nature interpretation trail. Other permitted activities include hunting, fishing, picnicking, and primitive camping. Long-range management plans for Blackbird State Forest outline goals for timber production, wildlife habitat, recreation, soil and water protection, wetland and endangered species protection, and public education.

Educational programs are available at the Blackbird State Forest Education Center on the Meadows Tract. Complementing a center at Redden State Forest, the facility has two meeting spaces and interactive displays: The Life Cycle of a Forest, Tree Identification, Invasive Species, Urban/Community Forestry, and Wildland Firefighting. Visitors can see a diorama of a beaver pond, a working beehive, and exotic and native insects. Work has also begun on a new nature trail, demonstration saw mill, and arboretum.

== History ==
As a state forest, Blackbird began with the 1941 acquisition of the Tybout Tract, purchased for $6,916.20 when land prices in New Castle County presented a rare opportunity for the Forestry Department. The Forestry Department's 1941 Annual Report stated:

For many years there has been a marked public concern over the failure of the Department to acquire State Forest lands in New Castle County but with only income funds at the disposal of the Department for acquisition purposes it has been expedient to spend those funds where the greatest acreage could be acquired per dollar expended. However, with the offer of a block of land in lower New Castle County at a figure comparable to similar lands in Sussex County the handicap of price was removed and the department has succeeded in acquiring 672 acres ... lying west of Blackbird in New Castle County.
