= Cheswold, Delaware =

- Town
- Seal

- Location of Cheswold in Kent County, Delaware

- Location of Cheswold in Delaware Cheswold (the United States)
- Coordinates: 39°13′09″N 75°35′09″W
- Country: United States
- State: Delaware
- County: Kent

Government
  - Type: Council-manager
  - Mayor: Santo Faronea
  - Vice Mayor: Max A. Amoako

Area
  - Total: 1.84 sq mi (4.76 km^{2})
  - Land: 1.84 sq mi (4.76 km^{2})
  - Water: 0 sq mi (0.00 km^{2})
- Elevation: 36 ft (11 m)

Population (2020)
  - Total: 1,923
  - Density: 1,050/sq mi (404/km^{2})
- Time zone: UTC−5 (Eastern (EST))
  - Summer (DST): UTC−4 (EDT)
- ZIP Code: 19936
- Area code: 302
- FIPS code: 10-14660
- GNIS feature ID: 213795
- Website: cheswold.delaware.gov

Cheswold is a town in Kent County in the U.S. state of Delaware. It is part of the Dover metropolitan area. The population was 1,923 in 2020.

== History ==
The town was incorporated in 1856 following the construction of the Delaware Railroad. When the town was founded, the population consisted of Lenape, blacks, and whites; the latter were mainly of Dutch descent. Given intermarriage among the workers over time, some residents were multiracial people. They were referred to as Cheswold Moors. The town was home to a railroad station called Leipsic Station, named for the nearby town of Leipsic, and the ancestral German city of Leipzig of some colonists.

The community became a shipping point for grain and fruit that was grown in the area. By 1860, the town had 35 homes, three general stores, a wheelwright, a brickyard, and a grain warehouse.

Prior to 1888, Cheswold was called Moorton after landowner James S. Moore. This also referred to the informal name for the mutiracial residents. The town was also known as Leipsic Station after the railroad station.

In 1888, a contest was held to rename the town, and Cheswold was chosen. Cheswold is a combination of "chess", from a large group of chestnut trees, and "wold", which stands for forest of trees.

Cheswold is the birthplace of politician J. Caleb Boggs, who served as Governor of Delaware, three terms as U.S. Representative, and two terms as U.S. Senator.

The town was home to the Cheswold Tigers, a minor league baseball team that existed from 1950 to 1960. It was known for a winning record. In the 21st century, Cheswold faced a period of financial issues but has seen its economy improve.

== Geography ==
Cheswold is located at 39°13′09″N 75°35′09″W (39.2192786, –75.5857596).

According to the United States Census Bureau, the town has a total area of 0.4 square miles (1.0 km^{2}), all land.

The Old Town area of Cheswold is located at the intersection of Main Street (Delaware Route 42) and Commerce Street west of the Delmarva Central Railroad tracks. It is the oldest existing settled part of the town. Cheswold is made up of several residential communities, including Parkers Run, Strimmels Mobile Home Park, Fox Pointe Mobile Home Park, Blanton Mobile Home Park, Stonington, and Nobles Pond.

Cheswold has a post office for P.O. boxes with a ZIP code of 19936. However, the delivery of mail in Cheswold is handled by the Dover post office associated with ZIP code 19904. The Cheswold name may be used for mail delivered to addresses in town with the 19904 ZIP code.

=== Climate ===
The climate in this area is characterized by hot, humid summers and generally mild to cool winters. According to the Köppen Climate Classification system, Cheswold has a humid subtropical climate, abbreviated "Cfa" on climate maps.

Climate data for Cheswold, Delaware
Month	Jan	Feb	Mar	Apr	May	Jun	Jul	Aug	Sep	Oct	Nov	Dec	Year
Record high °F (°C)	76 (24)	77 (25)	86 (30)	97 (36)	97 (36)	100 (38)	102 (39)	102 (39)	99 (37)	92 (33)	85 (29)	75 (24)	102 (39)
Mean daily maximum °F (°C)	43 (6)	47 (8)	55 (13)	66 (19)	75 (24)	83 (28)	87 (31)	85 (29)	79 (26)	69 (21)	59 (15)	47 (8)	66 (19)
Mean daily minimum °F (°C)	27 (−3)	29 (−2)	36 (2)	44 (7)	54 (12)	63 (17)	69 (21)	67 (19)	60 (16)	49 (9)	40 (4)	31 (−1)	47 (8)
Record low °F (°C)	−5 (−21)	−1 (−18)	8 (−13)	17 (−8)	34 (1)	43 (6)	45 (7)	45 (7)	38 (3)	25 (−4)	16 (−9)	1 (−17)	−5 (−21)
Average precipitation inches (mm)	3.41 (87)	3.18 (81)	4.31 (109)	3.88 (99)	4.25 (108)	4.00 (102)	4.09 (104)	4.36 (111)	4.13 (105)	3.42 (87)	3.48 (88)	3.65 (93)	46.16 (1,174)
Source: The Weather Channel

== Demographics ==
Historical population
Census	Pop.	Note	%±
1890	129		—
1900	201		55.8%
1910	223		10.9%
1920	287		28.7%
1930	211		−26.5%
1940	232		10.0%
1950	292		25.9%
1960	281		−3.8%
1970	286		1.8%
1980	269		−5.9%
1990	321		19.3%
2000	313		−2.5%
2010	1,380		340.9%
2020	1,923		39.3%
U.S. Decennial Census

=== 2020 census ===
As of the 2020 census, Cheswold had a population of 1,923. The median age was 43.0 years. 22.9% of residents were under the age of 18 and 21.7% of residents were 65 years of age or older. For every 100 females there were 88.0 males, and for every 100 females age 18 and over there were 84.5 males age 18 and over.

93.2% of residents lived in urban areas, while 6.8% lived in rural areas.

There were 691 households in Cheswold, of which 35.5% had children under the age of 18 living in them. Of all households, 49.2% were married-couple households, 15.6% were households with a male householder and no spouse or partner present, and 29.4% were households with a female householder and no spouse or partner present. About 21.7% of all households were made up of individuals and 11.5% had someone living alone who was 65 years of age or older.

There were 716 housing units, of which 3.5% were vacant. The homeowner vacancy rate was 2.2% and the rental vacancy rate was 2.5%.

Racial composition as of the 2020 census
Race	Number	Percent
White	883	45.9%
Black or African American	714	37.1%
American Indian and Alaska Native	29	1.5%
Asian	53	2.8%
Native Hawaiian and Other Pacific Islander	1	0.1%
Some other race	79	4.1%
Two or more races	164	8.5%
Hispanic or Latino (of any race)	120	6.2%

=== 2000 census ===
As of the census of 2000, there were 313 people, 116 households, and 80 families residing in the town. The population density was 729.8 inhabitants per square mile (281.8/km^{2}). There were 122 housing units at an average density of 284.5 units per square mile (109.8 units/km^{2}). The racial makeup of the town was 71.57% White, 12.14% African American, 5.11% Native American, 0.32% Asian, 6.39% from other races, and 4.47% from two or more races. Hispanic or Latino of any race were 10.86% of the population.

There were 116 households, out of which 37.1% had children under the age of 18 living with them, 42.2% were married couples living together, 19.0% had a female householder with no husband present, and 30.2% were non-families. 22.4% of all households were made up of individuals, and 7.8% had someone living alone who was 65 years of age or older. The average household size was 2.70 and the average family size was 2.95.

In the town, the population was spread out, with 30.7% under the age of 18, 10.2% from 18 to 24, 32.3% from 25 to 44, 15.7% from 45 to 64, and 11.2% who were 65 years of age or older. The median age was 30 years. For every 100 females, there were 108.7 males. For every 100 females age 18 and over, there were 102.8 males.

The median income for a household in the town was $38,750, and the median income for a family was $32,045. Males had a median income of $31,250 versus $22,083 for females. The per capita income for the town was $14,588. About 18.8% of families and 25.5% of the population were below the poverty line, including 38.7% of those under age 18 and 16.2% of those age 65 or over.

== Government ==
Cheswold has a council-manager system of government with a six-person Town Council, which consists of a mayor and vice mayor among the council members. Elections for the council are held every year, with three council seats up for election for two-year terms. After elections, the Town Council selects a Mayor, who then selects a Vice Mayor and Secretary/Treasurer. The Town Council holds meetings once a month. As of 2023, the Mayor is Santo Faronea, the Vice Mayor is Max A. Amoako, and the Secretary/Treasurer is Theon (Sam) Callender, while the remaining members of Town Council are Judith Johnson, Mark Moxley, and Robin Ridgway. The town government also consists of a Planning Commission, Town Administrator, Town Clerk, Building Inspector, Code Enforcement Officer, and Maintenance Technician.

Police services in Cheswold is provided by the Cheswold Police Department. The Town of Cheswold Police Department is currently under the direction of Chief Christopher Workman and has four full time officers. Cheswold officers currently patrol the Town of Cheswold at seven days a week with some special duty patrols at various times of the day. The Delaware State Police cover the Town when Cheswold Officers are off duty. Fire protection in Cheswold is provided by the Cheswold Volunteer Fire Company-Station 43.

== Infrastructure ==
=== Transportation ===
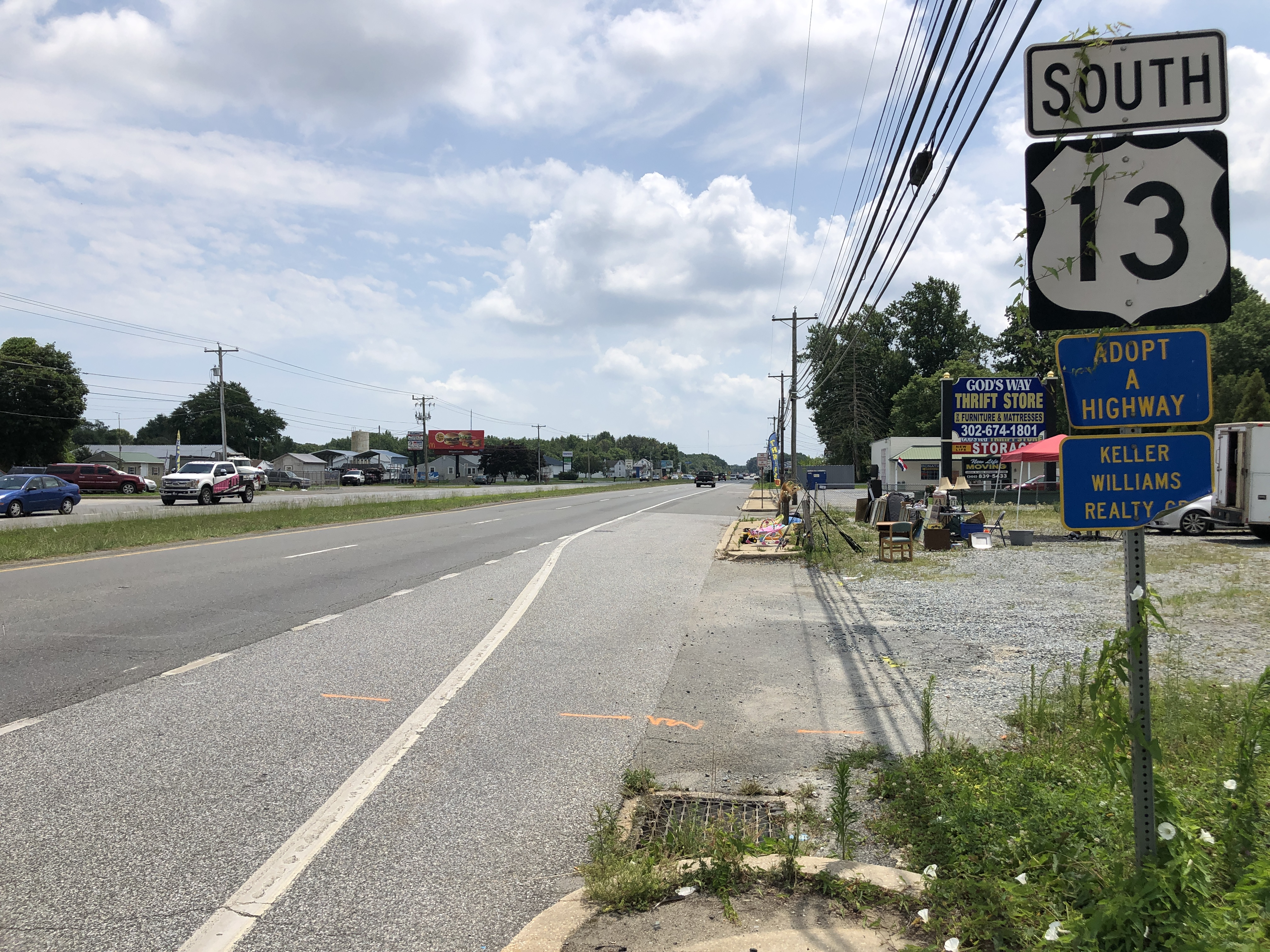
US 13 southbound in Cheswold

U.S. Route 13 runs north–south through the eastern part of Cheswold, heading north to Smyrna and Wilmington and south to Dover. Delaware Route 42 serves as the main east–west road through Cheswold, heading west to Kenton and east to Leipsic. The Delaware Route 1 toll road passes east of Cheswold but the nearest interchange is in Dover. DART First State provides bus service to Cheswold along Route 120, which heads south to Dover to connect to local bus routes serving the Dover area and north to Smyrna. The Delmarva Central Railroad's Delmarva Subdivision line passes north–south through Cheswold. Delaware Airpark, a general aviation airport, is located outside of Cheswold.

=== Utilities ===
Water and sewer service in Cheswold is provided by Middlesex Water Company. Electricity in Cheswold is provided by Delmarva Power, a subsidiary of Exelon. Natural gas service to Cheswold is provided by Chesapeake Utilities. Trash and recycling in the town is provided by Republic Services, Waste Industries, Waste Management, and Burns and McBride. Cable and internet in Cheswold is provided by DirecTV, Xfinity, Dish Network, and Verizon.

== Education ==
Cheswold is in the Capital School District. Dover High School is the comprehensive high school of the district.

== Notable people ==
- J. Caleb Boggs, politician who served as U.S. Representative from Delaware from 1947 to 1953, 62nd Governor of Delaware from 1953 to 1960, and U.S. Senator from Delaware from 1961 to 1973
