= Smyrna River =

Smyrna River Tributary to Delaware Bay
- Location within Delaware Location within the United States

Location
- Country: United States
- State: Delaware
- County: New Castle; Kent
- City: Smyrna

Physical characteristics
- Source
  - location: Smyrna, Delaware
  - coordinates: 39°18′46″N 075°34′30″W
- Mouth
  - location: Smyrna, Delaware
  - coordinates: 39°21′54″N 075°30′48″W
  - elevation: sea level (0 ft.)
- Length: 7 miles
- Basin size: 64 sq. mi

Basin features
- River system: Delaware River
- Tributaries
  - left: Massey Branch; Mill Creek; Corks Point Ditch; Sawmill Branch
  - right: Providence Creek; Greens Branch
- Waterbodies: Duck Creek Pond; Lake Como

The Smyrna River is a 7.3-mile-long (11.7 km) river in central Delaware in the United States.

It rises east of Smyrna, Delaware, at the confluence of Duck Creek and Mill Creek. It flows generally northeast, forming the boundary between Kent and New Castle counties. It enters Delaware Bay approximately 6 miles (10 km) northeast of Smyrna. It is navigable for its entire course.

== See also ==
- List of Delaware rivers
