= Appoquinimink River =

River in Delaware, United States

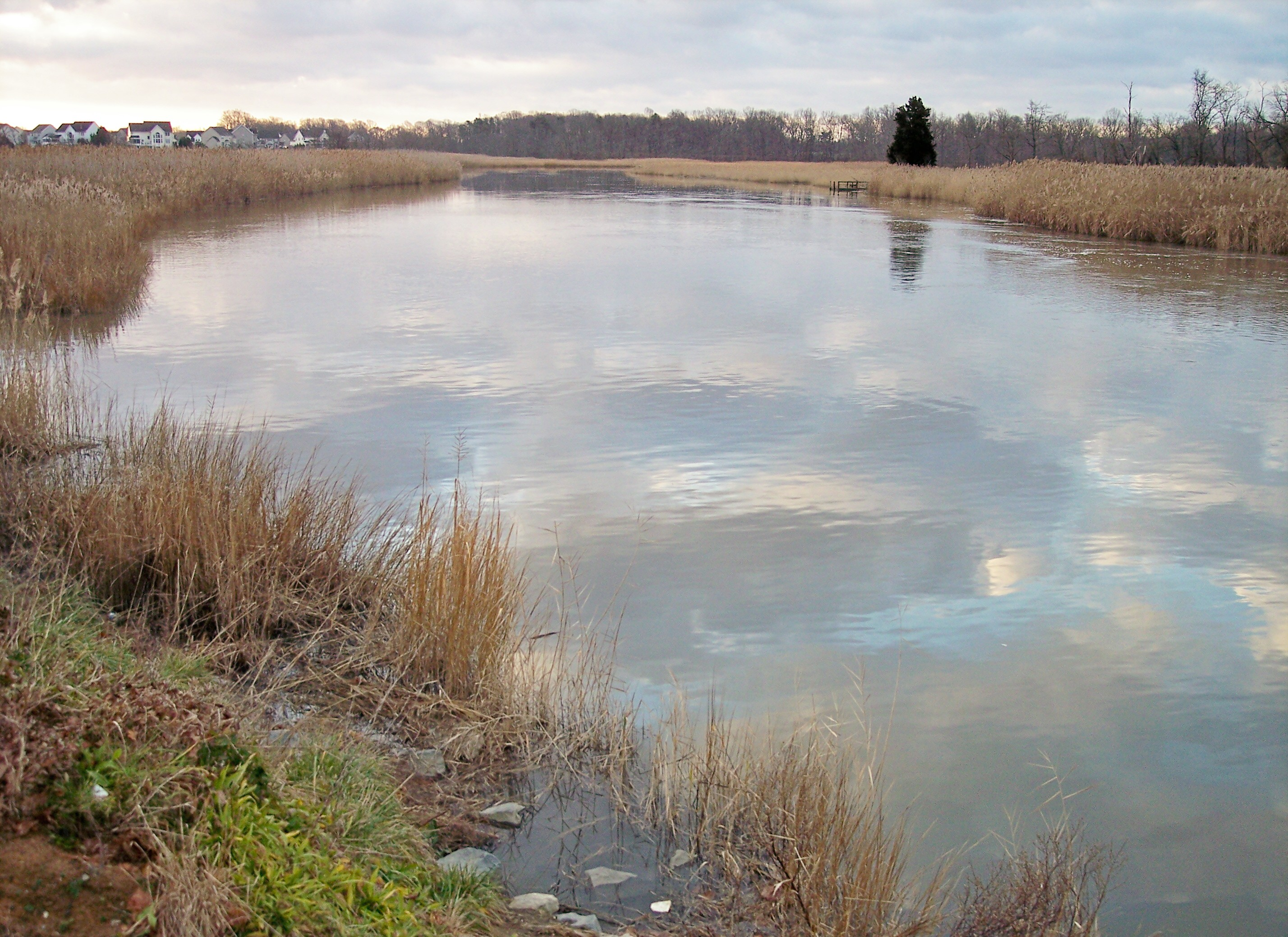
- The Appoquinimink River in Odessa in 2006

- Location of the mouth of the Appoquinimink River Appoquinimink River (the United States)

Location
- Country: United States
- State: Delaware

Physical characteristics
- Source
  - location: Near Townsend
  - coordinates: 39°22′52″N 75°44′14″W
  - elevation: 23 ft (7.0 m)(at Wiggins Mill Pond, approx. 1 mi/2 km downstream of source)
- Mouth: Delaware Bay
  - location: Near Odessa
  - coordinates: 39°26′52″N 75°34′49″W
  - elevation: 0 ft (0 m)
- Length: 15 mi (24 km)
- Basin size: 47 sq mi (120 km^{2})

The Appoquinimink River is a river flowing to Delaware Bay in northern Delaware in the United States. The river is 15.3 miles (24.6 km) long and drains an area of 47 square miles (120 km^{2}) on the Atlantic Coastal Plain.

The Appoquinimink flows for its entire length in southern New Castle County. It rises approximately 2 miles (3 km) west of Townsend and flows generally eastwardly, south of Middletown and past Odessa, to its mouth at the northern end of Delaware Bay, approximately 3 miles (5 km) east of Odessa. In its upper course the river passes through two man-made lakes, Wiggins Mill Pond and Noxontown Lake; the river is tidal to the dam at Noxontown Lake, and salinity from Delaware Bay typically affects the lowermost 5 miles (8 km) of the river. The lower 7 miles (11 km) of the river are considered to be navigable by the U.S. Army Corps of Engineers.

It collects three named tributaries along its course: From the north, Deep Creek, 4.2 miles (6.8 km) long (also known historically as the "North Appoquinimink River"); and Drawyers Creek, 8.2 miles (13.2 km) long; and from the south, Hangmans Run.

According to 2002 data from the United States Environmental Protection Agency, 54.9% of the Appoquinimink River watershed is occupied by agricultural uses (predominantly soybeans, corn, and wheat); 15.1% is residential; 9.9% is wetland; and 8.8% is forested.

In 2004, a non-profit group, The Appoquinimink River Association, was founded with a mission to protect the water and natural resources in the region surrounding the Appoquinimink River.

== Variant names and spellings ==
The United States Board on Geographic Names issued a decision clarifying the stream's name in 1950. According to the Geographic Names Information System, the Appoquinimink River has also been known historically as:

- Apequinemy River
- Apoquemene Creek
- Apoquiminy Creek
- Apoquin Creek
- Apoquinemy Creek
- Apoquinimune Creek
- Apoqunimy Creek
- Appaquinimink Creek
- Appoquenema Kill
- Appoquenimi Creeke
- Appoquinimink Creek
- Appoquinimunk Creek
- Appquenemink Creek
- Drawyer Creek
- Minques Kil
- Minques Kill
- Opoquenin Creek
- Opoquimony Creek
- Opoquimorn Creek
- Oppequimina Creek
- Oppoquenmin Creek
- Oppoquenmink River

== See also ==
- List of Delaware rivers
- List of Delaware River tributaries
