= Ward Branch (Browns Branch tributary) =

Stream in Delaware, USA

Ward Branch Tributary to Browns Branch
- Location of Ward Branch mouth Ward Branch (Browns Branch tributary) (the United States)

Location
- Country: United States
- State: Delaware
- County: Kent

Physical characteristics
- Source: Lednum Branch divide
  - location: about 1 mile east-northeast of Marvels Crossroads, Delaware
  - coordinates: 38°56′35″N 075°29′07″W
  - elevation: 44 ft (13 m)
- Mouth: Browns Branch
  - location: about 1 mile northeast of Argos Choice, Delaware
  - coordinates: 38°58′14″N 075°29′15″W
  - elevation: 0 ft (0 m)
- Length: 2.19 mi (3.52 km)
- Basin size: 2.07 square miles (5.4 km^{2})
- Discharge
  - location: Browns Branch
  - average: 2.61 cu ft/s (0.074 m^{3}/s) at mouth with Browns Branch

Basin features
- Progression: Browns Branch → Murderkill River → Delaware Bay → Atlantic Ocean
- River system: Murderkill River
- Tributaries
  - left: unnamed tributaries
  - right: unnamed tributaries
- Bridges: Sandbox Road, DE 15

Ward Branch is a 2.19 mi (3.52 km) long 1st order tributary to Browns Branch in Kent County, Delaware.

== Course ==
Ward Branch rises on the Lednum Branch divide about 1 mile east-northeast of Marvels Crossroads, Delaware. Ward Branch then flows north to meet Browns Branch about 1-mile northeast of Argos Choice, Delaware.

== Watershed ==
Ward Branch drains 2.07 square miles (5.4 km^{2}) of area, receives about 45.6 in/year of precipitation, has a topographic wetness index of 616.68 and is about 6.7% forested.

== See also ==
- List of Delaware rivers

== Maps ==
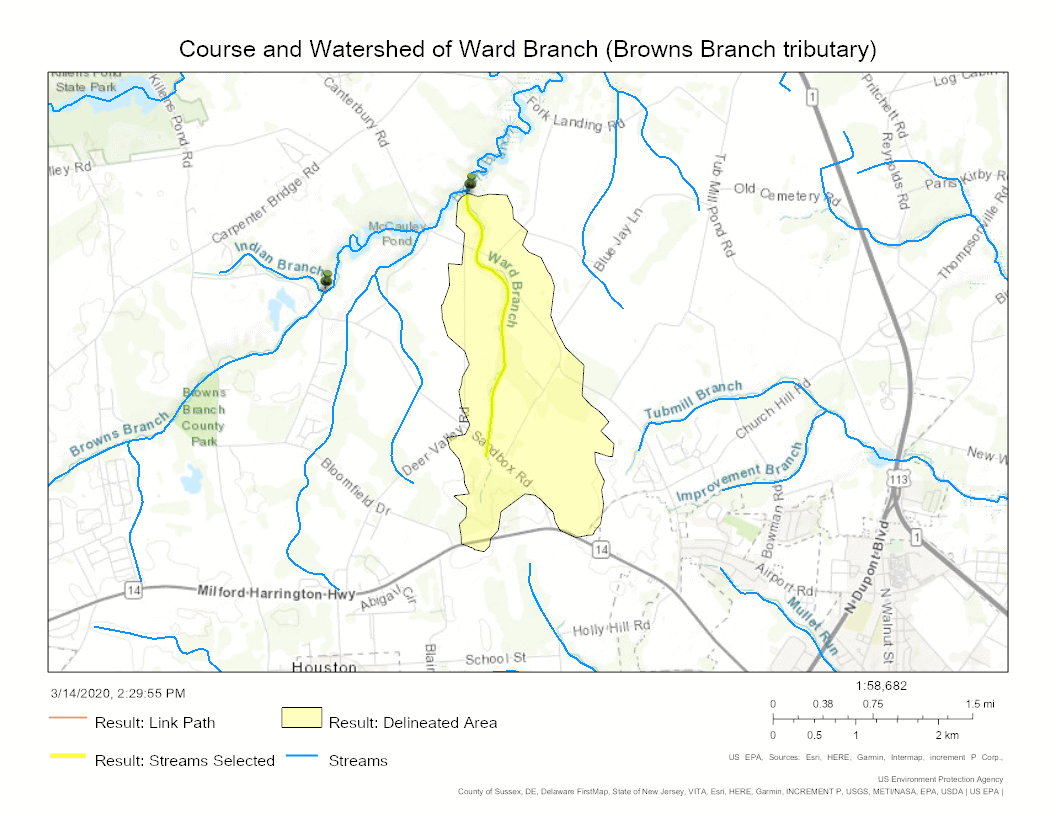
Course and Watershed of Ward Branch (Browns Branch tributary)
