= Indian Branch (Browns Branch tributary) =

Stream in Delaware, USA

Indian Branch Tributary to Browns Branch
- Location of Indian Branch mouth Indian Branch (Browns Branch tributary) (the United States)

Location
- Country: United States
- State: Delaware
- County: Kent

Physical characteristics
- Source: Murderkill River divide
  - location: Melvins Crossroads, Delaware
  - coordinates: 38°57′45″N 075°31′47″W
  - elevation: 35 ft (11 m)
- Mouth: Browns Branch
  - location: about 1 mile southeast of Melvins Crossroads, Delaware
  - coordinates: 38°57′38″N 075°30′27″W
  - elevation: 7 ft (2.1 m)
- Length: 0.94 mi (1.51 km)
- Basin size: 1.36 square miles (3.5 km^{2})
- Discharge
  - location: Browns Branch
  - average: 1.60 cu ft/s (0.045 m^{3}/s) at mouth with Browns Branch

Basin features
- Progression: Browns Branch → Murderkill River → Delaware Bay → Atlantic Ocean
- River system: Murderkill River
- Tributaries
  - left: unnamed tributaries
  - right: unnamed tributaries
- Bridges: none

Indian Branch is a 0.94 mi (1.51 km) long 1st order tributary to Browns Branch in Kent County, Delaware.

== Course ==
Indian Branch rises on the Murderkill River divide at Melvins Crossroads, Delaware. Indian Branch then flows east to meet Browns Branch about 1-mile southeast of Melvins Crossroads, Delaware.

== Watershed ==
Indian Branch drains 1.36 square miles (3.5 km^{2}) of area, receives about 45.3 in/year of precipitation, has a topographic wetness index of 577.69 and is about 3.3% forested.

== See also ==
- List of Delaware rivers

== Maps ==
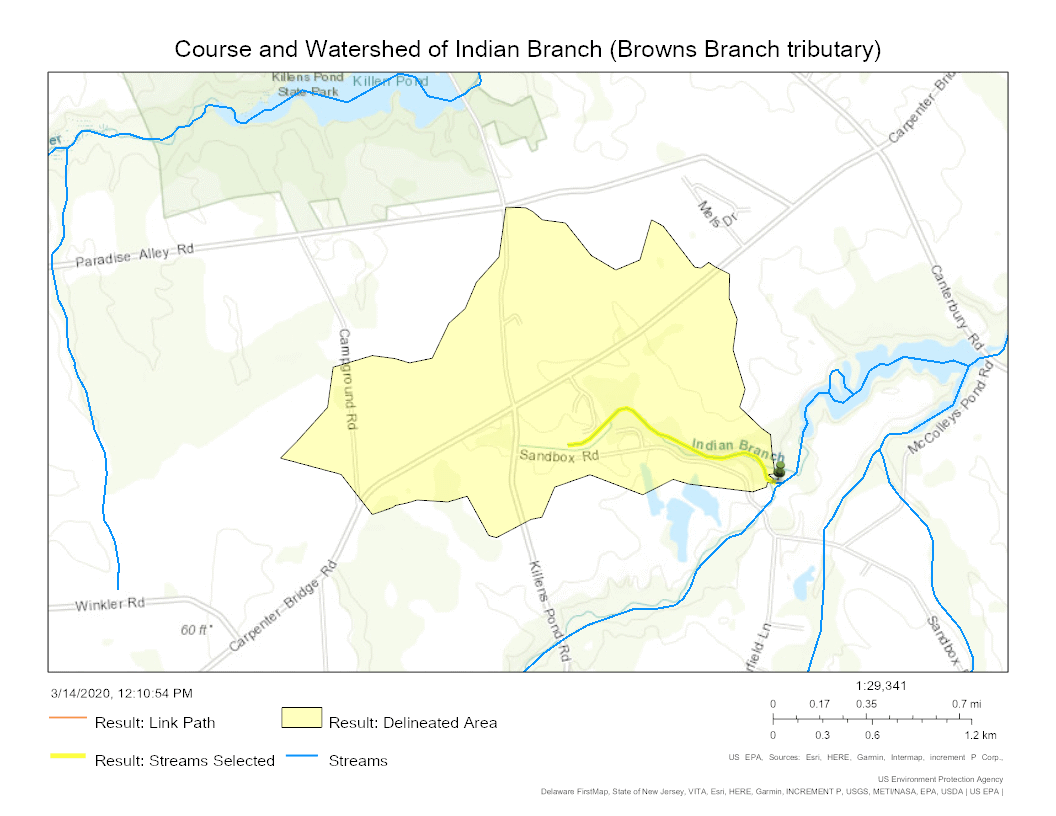
Course and Watershed of Indian Branch (Browns Branch tributary)
