= Ash Gut (Murderkill River tributary) =

Stream in Delaware, USA

Ash Gut Tributary to Murderkill River
- Location of Ash Gut mouth Ash Gut (Murderkill River tributary) (the United States)

Location
- Country: United States
- State: Delaware
- County: Kent

Physical characteristics
- Source: Pratt Branch divide
  - location: about 0.2 miles west of Frederica, Delaware
  - coordinates: 39°00′45″N 075°29′52″W
  - elevation: 30 ft (9.1 m)
- Mouth: Murderkill River
  - location: about 0.5 miles south of Frederica, Delaware
  - coordinates: 38°59′42″N 075°28′14″W
  - elevation: 0 ft (0 m)
- Length: 2.07 mi (3.33 km)
- Basin size: 2.94 square miles (7.6 km^{2})
- Discharge
  - location: Murderkill River
  - average: 3.60 cu ft/s (0.102 m^{3}/s) at mouth with Ash Gut

Basin features
- Progression: Murderkill River → Delaware Bay → Atlantic Ocean
- River system: Murderkill River
- Tributaries
  - left: unnamed tributaries
  - right: unnamed tributaries
- Bridges: DE 12, Carpenter Bridge Road

Ash Gut is a 2.07 mi (3.33 km) long 2nd order tributary to the Murderkill River in Kent County, Delaware, United States.

== Course ==
Ash Gut rises on the Pratt Branch divide about 0.2 miles west of Frederica, Delaware. Ash Gut then flows southeast to meet the Murderkill River about 0.5 miles south of Frederica, Delaware.

== Watershed ==
Ash Gut drains 2.94 square miles (7.6 km^{2}) of area, receives about 45.1 in/year of precipitation, has a topographic wetness index of 586.46 and is about 4.2% forested.

== See also ==
- List of Delaware rivers

== Maps ==
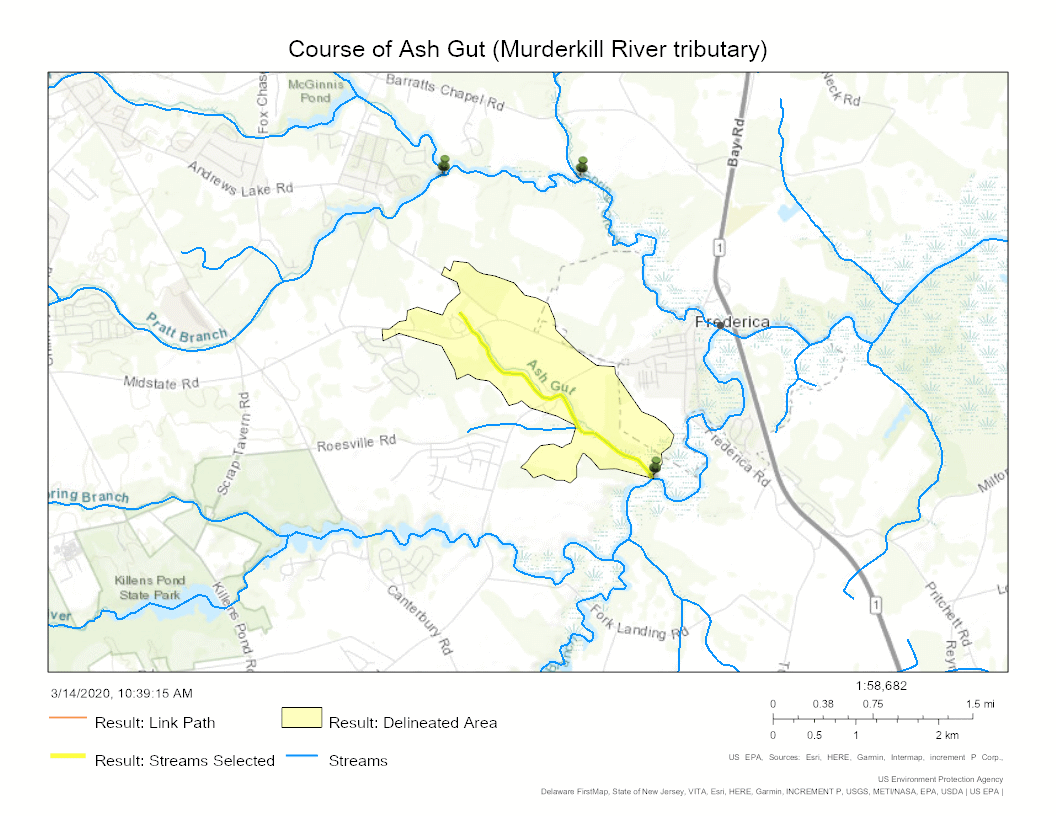
Course of Ash Gut (Murderkill River tributary)

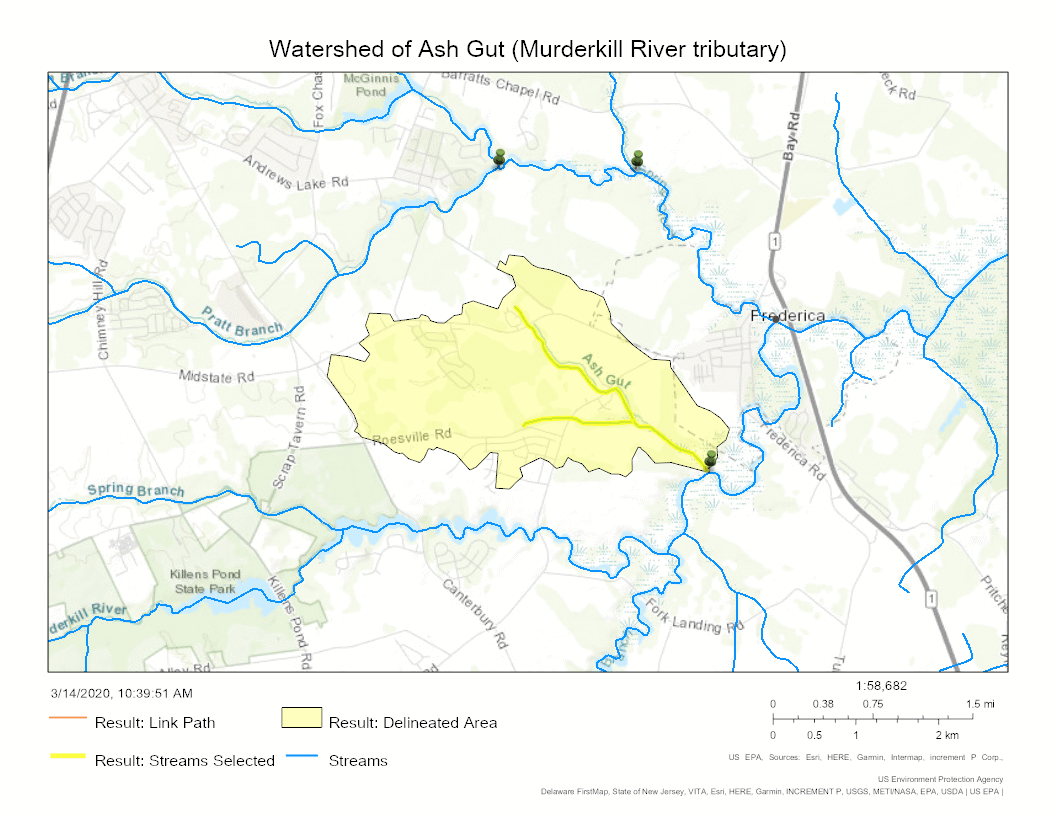
Watershed of Ash Gut (Murderkill River tributary)
