= Double Run (Spring Creek tributary) =

Stream in Delaware, USA

Double Run Tributary to Spring Creek
- Location of Double Run mouth Double Run (Spring Creek tributary) (the United States)

Location
- Country: United States
- State: Delaware
- County: Kent

Physical characteristics
- Source: Heron Drain divide
  - location: about 0.25 miles north of Breezewood, Delaware
  - coordinates: 39°03′19″N 075°33′59″W
  - elevation: 50 ft (15 m)
- Mouth: Spring Creek
  - location: about 1.5 miles north of Frederica, Delaware
  - coordinates: 39°01′41″N 075°28′50″W
  - elevation: 0 ft (0 m)
- Length: 6.65 mi (10.70 km)
- Basin size: 9.27 square miles (24.0 km^{2})
- Discharge
  - location: Spring Creek
  - average: 11.18 cu ft/s (0.317 m^{3}/s) at mouth with Spring Creek

Basin features
- Progression: Spring Creek → Murderkill River → Delaware Bay → Atlantic Ocean
- River system: Murderkill River
- Tributaries
  - left: Thorndyk Branch
  - right: unnamed tributaries
- Bridges: US 13, Barney Jenkins Road, Peachtree Run, Woodlytown Road, Irish Hill Road, Barretts Chapel Road

Double Run is a 6.65 mi (10.70 km) long 2nd order tributary to Spring Creek in Kent County, Delaware.

== Variant names ==
According to the Geographic Names Information System, it has also been known historically as:

- Amsterdam Branch
- Bucks Branch

== Course ==
Double Run rises on the Heron Drain divide about 0.25 miles north of Breezewood, Delaware. Double Run then flows east then southeast to meet Spring Creek about 1.5 miles north of Frederica, Delaware.

== Watershed ==
Double Run drains 9.27 square miles (24.0 km^{2}) of area, receives about 44.8 in/year of precipitation, has a topographic wetness index of 575.19 and is about 9.7% forested.

== See also ==
- List of Delaware rivers

== Maps ==
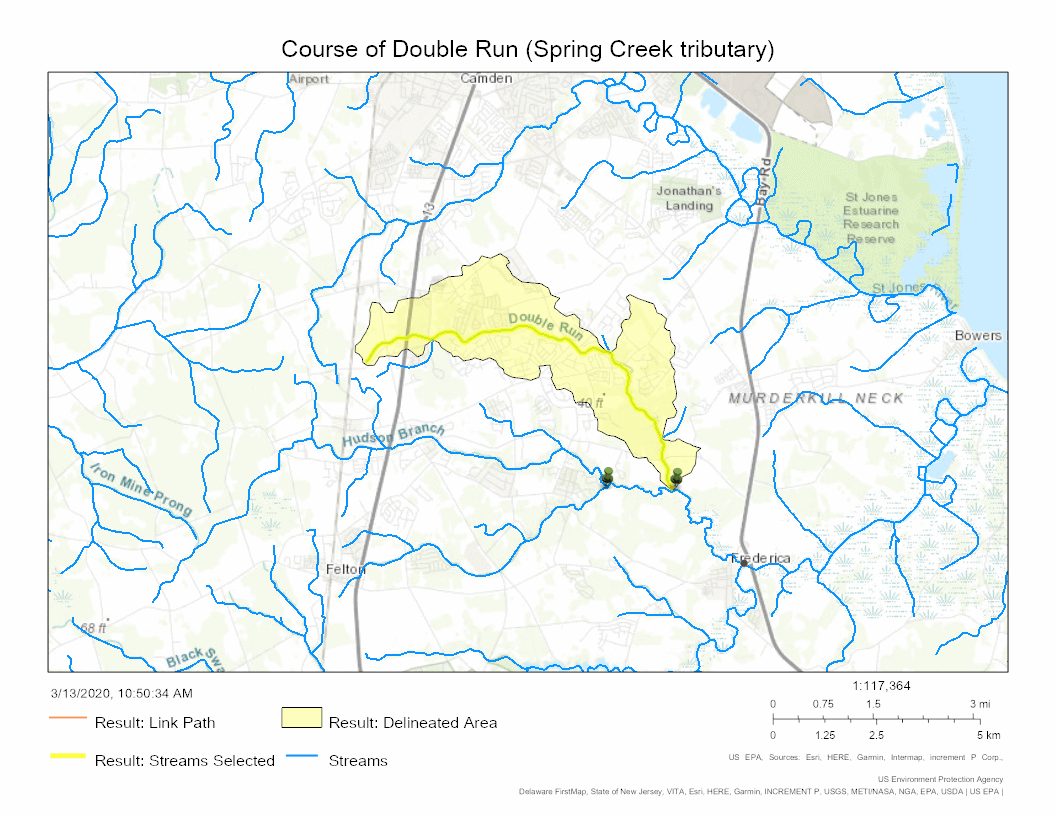
Course of Double Run (Spring Creek tributary)

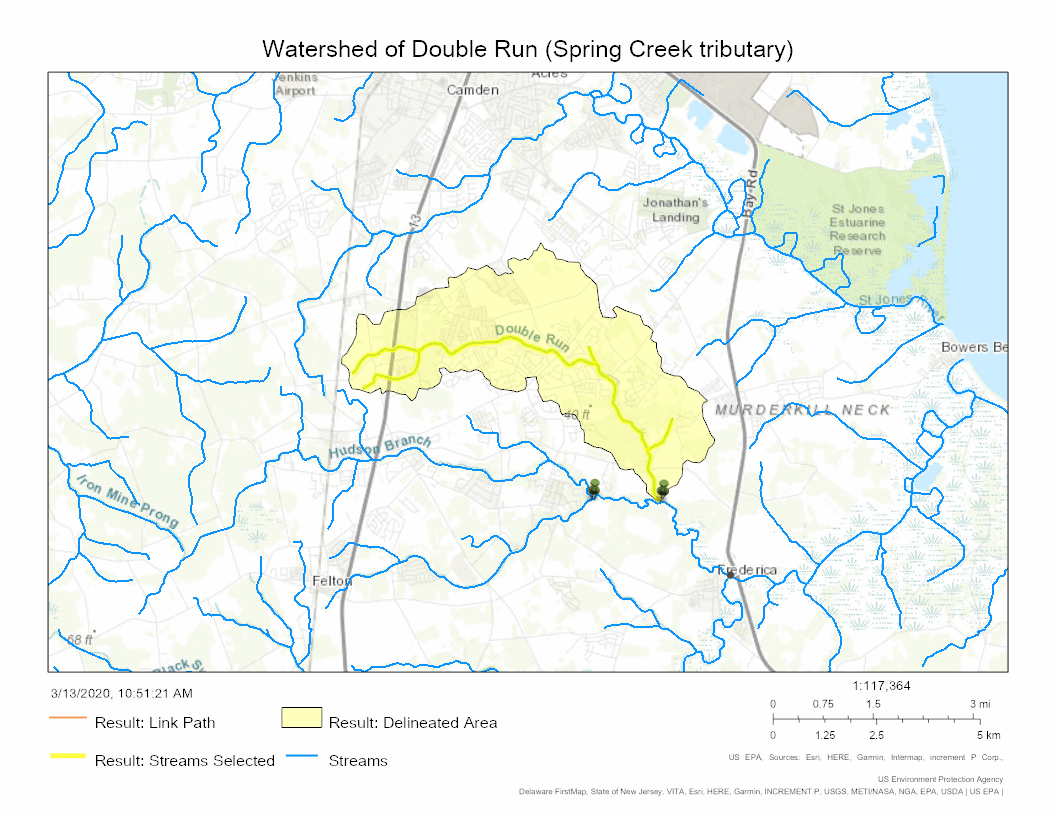
Watershed of Double Run (Spring Creek tributary)
