= Hudson Branch (Spring Creek tributary) =

Stream in Delaware, USA

Hudson Branch Tributary to Spring Creek
- Location of Hudson Branch mouth Hudson Branch (Spring Creek tributary) (the United States)

Location
- Country: United States
- State: Delaware
- County: Kent

Physical characteristics
- Source: Cow Marsh Ditch divide
  - location: about 0.5 miles southwest of Riverdale Estates, Delaware
  - coordinates: 39°00′11″N 075°37′32″W
  - elevation: 60 ft (18 m)
- Mouth: Spring Creek
  - location: about 2.5 miles northwest of Frederica, Delaware
  - coordinates: 39°01′44″N 075°30′00″W
  - elevation: 0 ft (0 m)
- Length: 9.36 mi (15.06 km)
- Basin size: 8.90 square miles (23.1 km^{2})
- Discharge
  - location: Spring Creek
  - average: 10.78 cu ft/s (0.305 m^{3}/s) at mouth with Spring Creek

Basin features
- Progression: Spring Creek → Murderkill River → Delaware Bay → Atlantic Ocean
- River system: Murderkill River
- Tributaries
  - left: unnamed tributaries
  - right: unnamed tributaries
- Waterbodies: McGinnis Pond
- Bridges: Firetower Road, Turkey Point Road, US 13, DE 15, Barratts Chapel Road, Fox Chase Road, McGinnis Pond Road

Hudson Branch is a 9.36 mi (15.06 km) long 2nd order tributary to Spring Creek in Kent County, Delaware.

== Variant names ==
According to the Geographic Names Information System, it has also been known historically as:

- Berrytown Branch
- Canterbury Branch
- Cranberry Branch
- Hudson Ditch
- Hudson's Branch

== Course ==
Hudson Branch rises on the Cow Marsh Ditch divide about 0.5 miles (0.80 km) southwest of Riverdale Estates, Delaware. Hudson Branch then flows easterly to meet Spring Creek about 2.5 miles (4.0 km) northwest of Frederica, Delaware.

== Watershed ==
Hudson Branch drains 8.90 square miles (23.1 km^{2}) of area, receives about 44.9 in/year of precipitation, has a topographic wetness index of 597.91 and is about 6.0% forested.

== See also ==
- List of Delaware rivers

== Maps ==
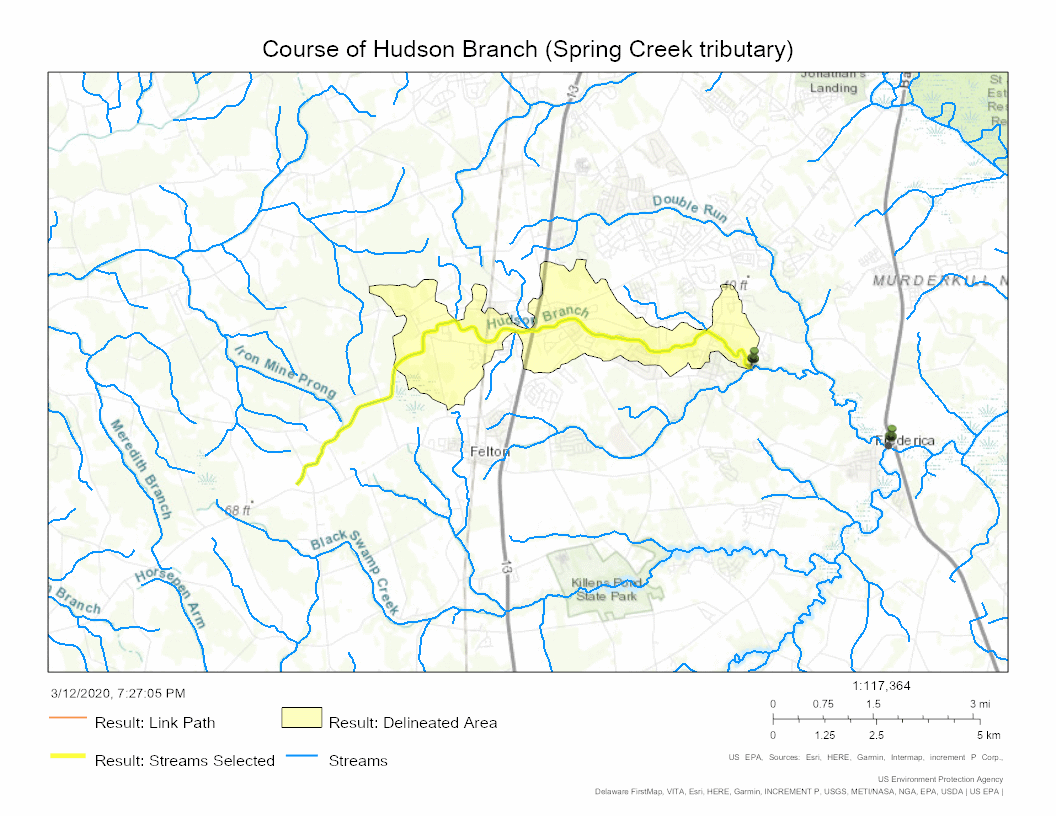
Course of Hudson Branch (Spring Creek tributary)

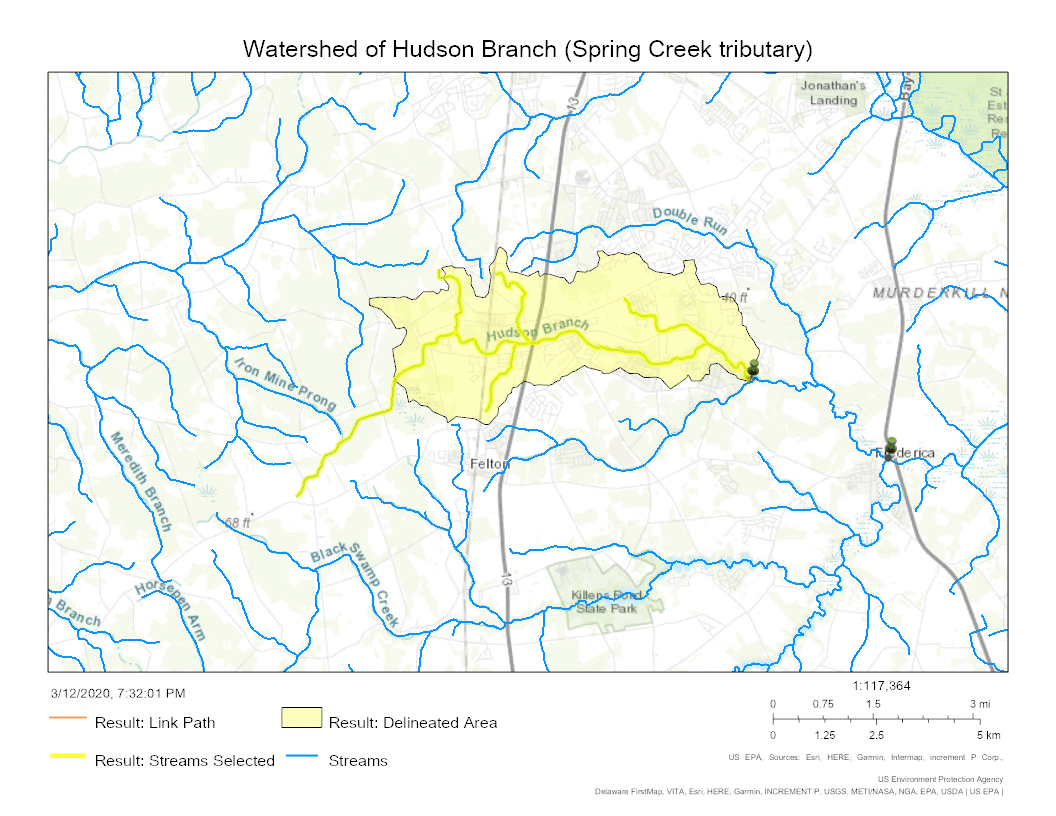
Watershed of Hudson Branch (Spring Creek tributary)
