= South Bowers, Delaware =

Unincorporated community in Delaware, United States

- Unincorporated community
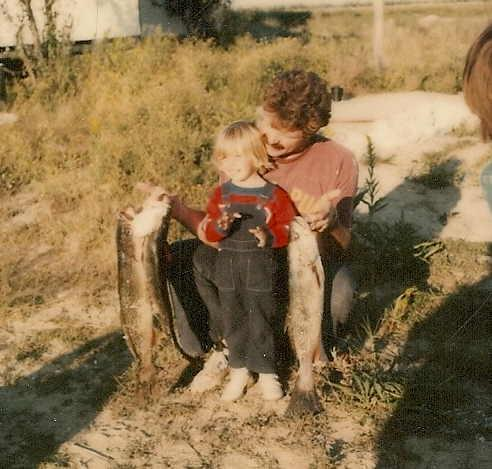
- A father and son celebrating the day's catch, South Bowers, DE, in 1976

- Location within Delaware Location within the United States
- Coordinates: 39°3′26″N 75°23′51″W
- Country: United States
- State: Delaware
- County: Kent
- Elevation: 3 ft (0.91 m)
- Time zone: UTC-5 (Eastern (EST))
  - Summer (DST): UTC-4 (EDT)
- Area code: 302
- GNIS feature ID: 214676

South Bowers is an unincorporated community in Kent County, Delaware, United States. South Bowers is located on the Delaware Bay on the south side of the Murderkill River opposite Bowers. It was a part of the James D. Sipple home farm containing 421 acres of upland, marsh and beachland and he subdivided a small part of the farm into the lots comprising South Bowers before he died in 1890. His son, James H. Sipple acquired the interests of his siblings and conveyed the farm to his daughter, Sarah E. Webb in 1920.The Webb family are in ownership of this land to this day.

The Island Field Site was listed on the National Register of Historic Places in 1972.
