= Carpenters Bridge, Delaware =

Coordinates: 38°59′21″N 75°29′39″W

Carpenters Bridge
- Area
- Interactive map of Carpenters Bridge
- Country: United States
- State: Delaware
- County: Kent
- Established: 1890

Carpenters Bridge in Kent County, Delaware, United States is an area associated with the name Carpenters Bridge. It contains a minor bridge with that name that crosses the Murderkill River, a road by the same name and the immediate area has a pending residential area called Carpenter Bridge Crossing.

== Bridge ==
Carpenters Bridge is a bridge by that name over the Murderkill River in Kent County, Delaware, 6 miles northwest of Milford, Delaware

The bridge was in existence as early as 1890, when it was mentioned in The New York Times as the site of a murder. It was rebuilt or improved in 1899, and replaced with prestressed concrete and mixed box beam and girders construction in 1962.

The bridge spans land that once was considered by local residents to be of historic importance, though neither the State of Delaware nor developers such as Carpenter Bridge Properties, LLC, through the construction company Lessard Builders, now deem it as a historic area.

== Road ==
Road 35, is a state-maintained connector road and is locally designated as Carpenter Bridge Road. This road enables significant commercial and public access between Harrington and Frederica, Delaware. The road has hundreds of houses along its length that spans two zip code areas. The zip code divider is the bridge itself by the same name.

== Area ==
The Carpenter Bridge Crossing Home Owners Association is a pending 193 unit subdivision. The 2006 State of Delaware approved planned residential community is located a little east of the bridge. Construction has been delayed due to the economy and construction has not yet started as of 2012. Carpenters Bridge Properties, LLC is under the construction company Lessard Builders, who are the developers. Google Maps show the planned streets and lots, but the satellite view clearly shows construction has not yet started.

The area is also home to a number of residential subdivisions, natural attractions such as the Burton-Derrickson Tract of the Murderkill River Nature Preserve and Killens Pond State Park, and at least one active bald eagle (Haliaeetus leucocephalus) nest. The area was proposed as the site of a renewable solar energy farm at Carpenters Bridge in 2004 which was still under consideration in 2010.
