= Island Field =

Island Field may refer to:

- Island Field, Limerick, Ireland
- Island Field Site, Delaware, United States
- Island Field, pesäpallo field in Vimpeli, Finland
