= Pratt Branch (Spring Creek tributary) =

Stream in Delaware, USA

Pratt Branch Tributary to Spring Creek
- Location of Pratt Branch mouth Pratt Branch (Spring Creek tributary) (the United States)

Location
- Country: United States
- State: Delaware
- County: Kent
- City: Felton, Delaware

Physical characteristics
- Source: Fan Branch divide
  - location: Felton, Delaware
  - coordinates: 39°00′13″N 075°34′31″W
  - elevation: 55 ft (17 m)
- Mouth: Spring Creek
  - location: about 2.5 miles northwest of Frederica, Delaware
  - coordinates: 39°01′42″N 075°29′57″W
  - elevation: 0 ft (0 m)
- Length: 5.18 mi (8.34 km)
- Basin size: 6.37 square miles (16.5 km^{2})
- Discharge
  - location: Spring Creek
  - average: 7.77 cu ft/s (0.220 m^{3}/s) at mouth with Spring Creek

Basin features
- Progression: Spring Creek → Murderkill River → Delaware Bay → Atlantic Ocean
- River system: Murderkill River
- Tributaries
  - left: unnamed tributaries
  - right: unnamed tributaries
- Waterbodies: Andrews Lake
- Bridges: DE 12, US 13, Chimney Hill Road, DE 15, Andrews Lake Road

Pratt Branch is a 5.18 mi (8.34 km) long 2nd order tributary to Spring Creek in Kent County, Delaware.

== Variant names ==
According to the Geographic Names Information System, it has also been known historically as:

- Bratts Branch
- Pratt's Branch

== Course ==
Pratts Branch rises on the Fan Branch divide at Felton, Delaware. Pratt Branch then flows northeasterly to meet Spring Creek about 2.5 miles northwest of Frederica, Delaware.

== Watershed ==
Pratts Branch drains 6.37 square miles (16.5 km^{2}) of area, receives about 45.0 in/year of precipitation, has a topographic wetness index of 569.67 and is about 7.0% forested.

== See also ==
- List of Delaware rivers

== Maps ==
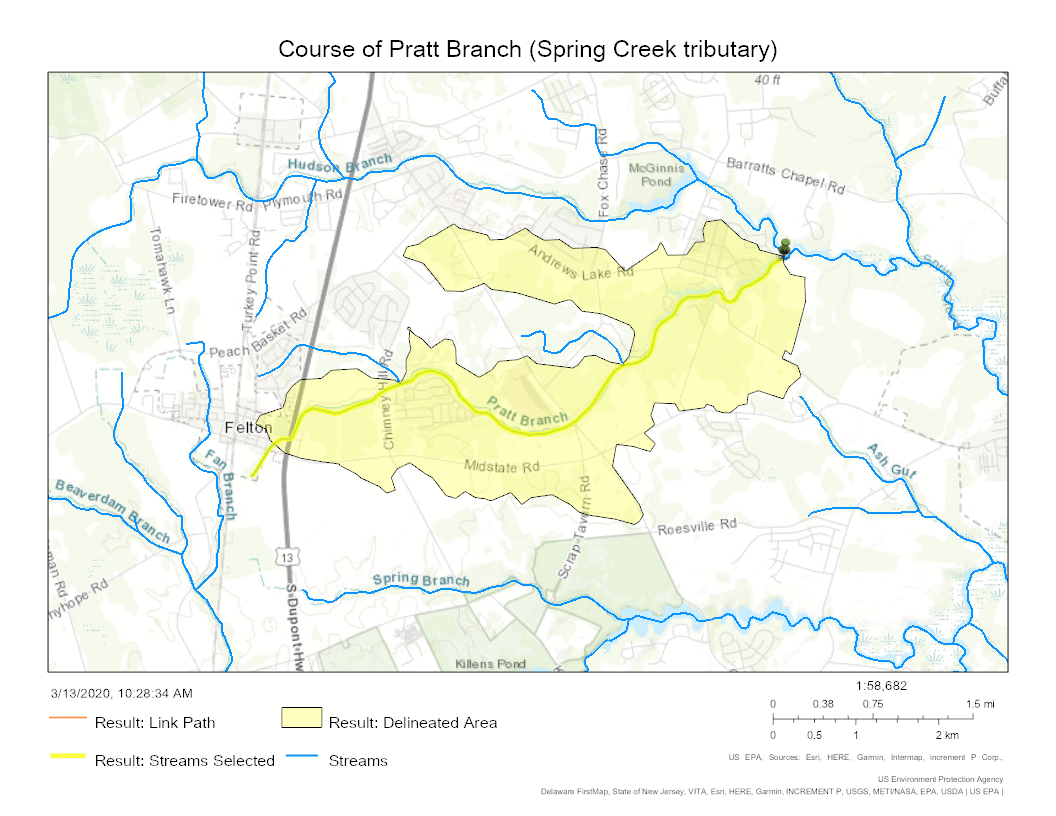
Course of Pratt Branch (Spring Creek tributary)

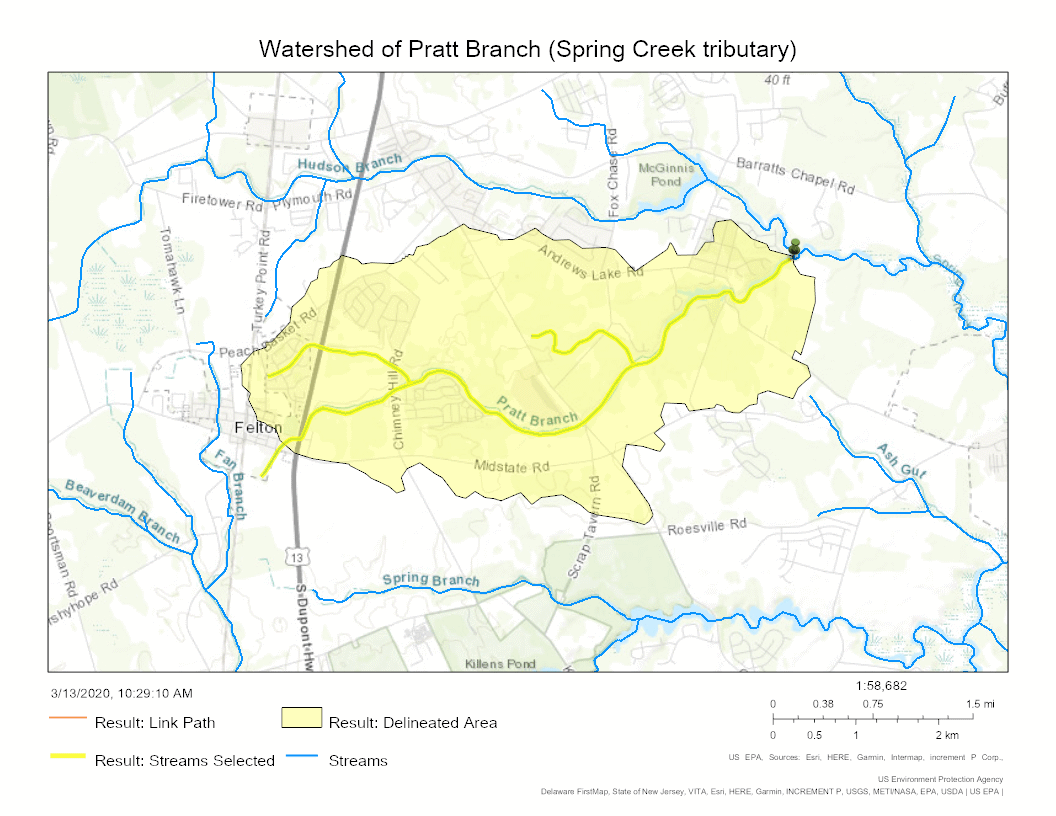
Watershed of Pratt Branch (Spring Creek tributary)
