= Carpenter Bridge =

Carpenter Bridge may refer to:

- Carpenter Bridge (Ohio River)
- Carpenter Bridge (Massachusetts)
- Carpenter Bridge (Iloilo)
- Carpenters Bridge, Delaware
