= Browns Branch (Murderkill River tributary) =

Stream in Delaware, USA

Browns Branch Tributary to Murderkill River
- Location of Browns Branch mouth Browns Branch (Murderkill River tributary) (the United States)

Location
- Country: United States
- State: Delaware
- County: Kent

Physical characteristics
- Source: Nanticoke River divide
  - location: about 1 mile south of Harrington, Delaware
  - coordinates: 38°53′45″N 075°33′50″W
  - elevation: 58 ft (18 m)
- Mouth: Murderkill River
  - location: about 1 mile south-southwest of Frederica, Delaware
  - coordinates: 38°59′12″N 075°28′32″W
  - elevation: 0 ft (0 m)
- Length: 10.27 mi (16.53 km)
- Basin size: 23.02 square miles (59.6 km^{2})
- Discharge
  - location: Murderkill River
  - average: 28.70 cu ft/s (0.813 m^{3}/s) at mouth with Murderkill River

Basin features
- Progression: Murderkill River → Delaware Bay → Atlantic Ocean
- River system: Murderkill River
- Tributaries
  - left: Indian Branch
  - right: Ward Branch
- Waterbodies: McColley Pond
- Bridges: Corn Crib Road, Cluckey Drive, DE 14, Jackson Ditch Road (x2), Killens Pond Road, Sandbox Road, Canterbury Road, Fork Landing Road

Browns Branch is a 10.27 mi (16.53 km) long 3rd order tributary to the Murderkill River in Kent County, Delaware.

== Variant names ==
According to the Geographic Names Information System, it has also been known historically as:

- Spring Branch

== Course ==
Browns Branch rises on the Nanticoke River divide about 1 mile south of Harrington, Delaware. Browns Branch then flows northeasterly to meet the Murderkill River about 1 mile south-southwest of Frederica, Delaware.

== Watershed ==
Browns Branch drains 23.02 square miles (59.6 km^{2}) of area, receives about 45.4 in/year of precipitation, has a topographic wetness index of 648.58 and is about 10.4% forested.

== See also ==
- List of Delaware rivers

== Maps ==
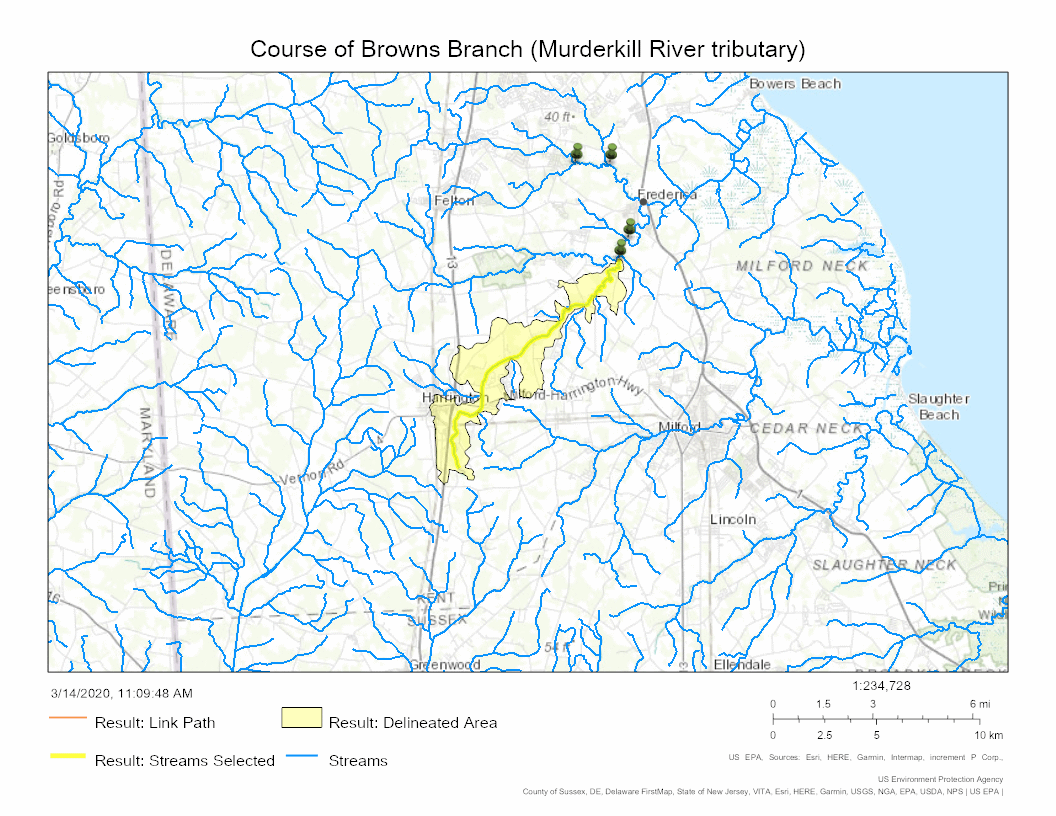
Course of Browns Branch (Murderkill River tributary)

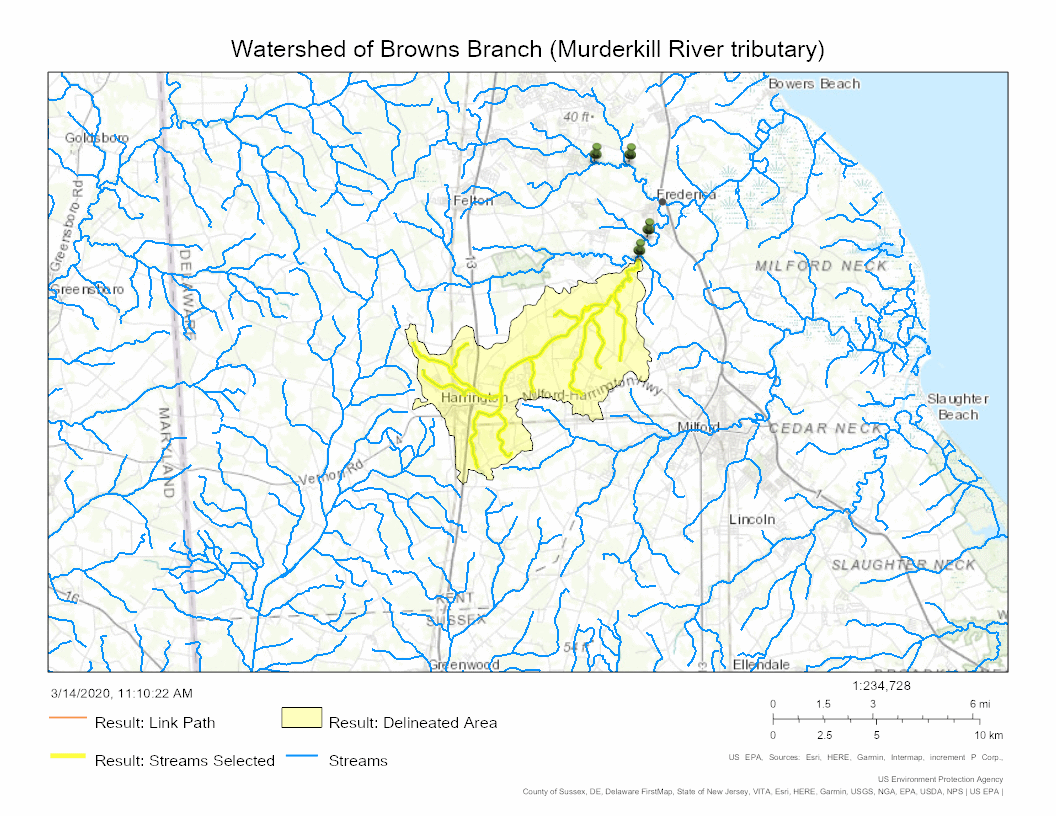
Watershed of Browns Branch (Murderkill River tributary)
