= Spring Creek (Murderkill River tributary) =

Stream in Delaware, USA

Spring Creek Tributary to Murderkill River
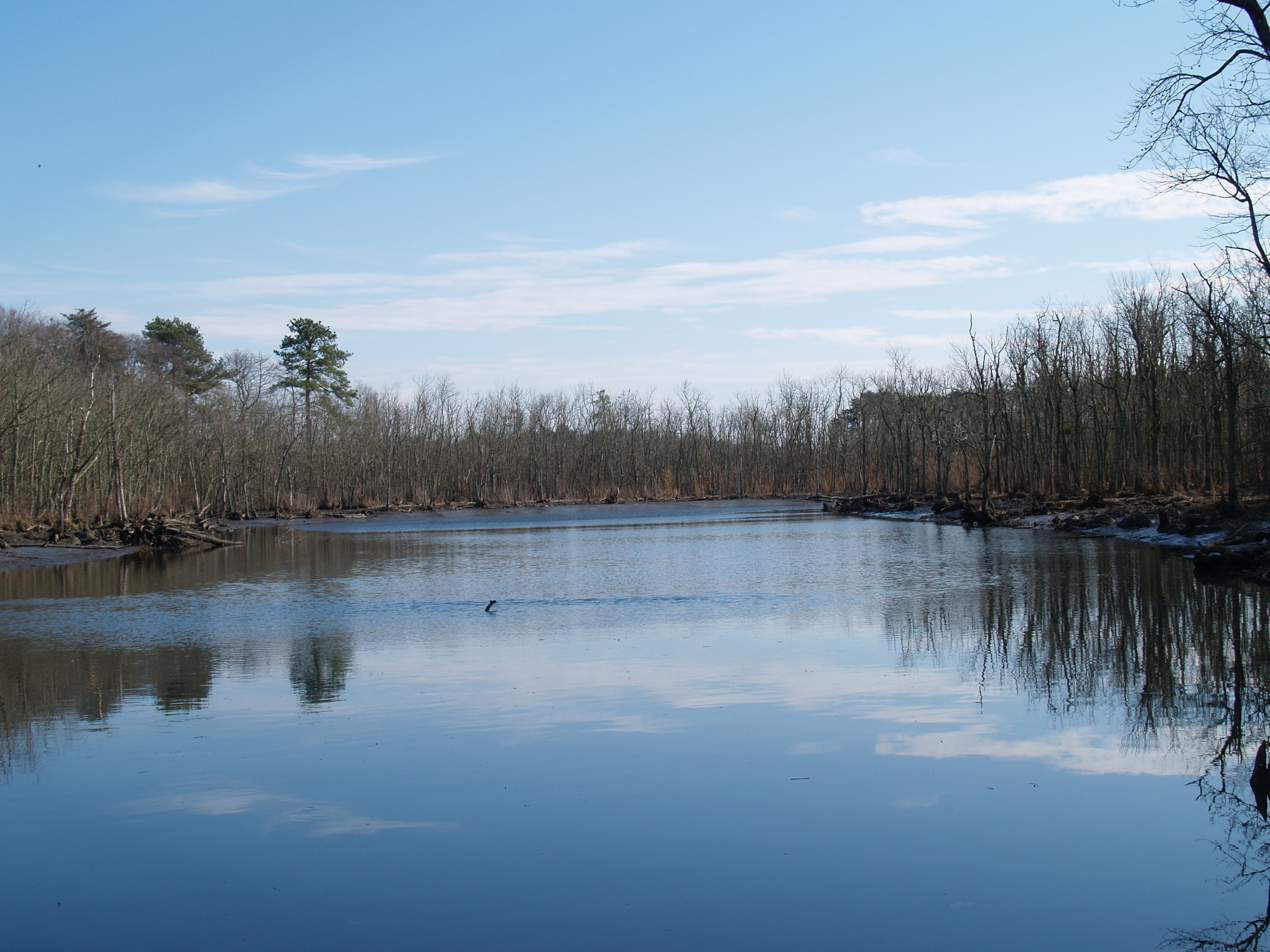
- Spring Creek upstream of Frederica, Delaware

- Location of Spring Creek mouth Spring Creek (Murderkill River tributary) (the United States)

Location
- Country: United States
- State: Delaware
- County: Kent
- City: Frederica

Physical characteristics
- Source: Confluence of Hudson Branch and Pratt Branch
  - location: about 2.5 miles northwest of Frederica, Delaware
  - coordinates: 39°01′42″N 075°29′58″W
  - elevation: 0 ft (0 m)
- Mouth: Murderkill River
  - location: Frederica, Delaware
  - coordinates: 39°00′42″N 075°27′40″W
  - elevation: 0 ft (0 m)
- Length: 3.73 mi (6.00 km)
- Basin size: 27.95 square miles (72.4 km^{2})
- Discharge
  - location: Murderkill River
  - average: 33.73 cu ft/s (0.955 m^{3}/s) at mouth with Murderkill River

Basin features
- Progression: Murderkill River → Delaware Bay → Atlantic Ocean
- River system: Murderkill River
- Tributaries
  - left: Hudson Branch; Double Run
  - right: Pratt Branch
- Bridges: DE 12

Spring Creek is a 3.73 mi (6.00 km) long 3rd order tributary to the Murderkill River in Kent County, Delaware.

== Course ==
Spring Creek forms at the confluence of Hudson Branch and Pratt Branch about 2.5 miles northwest of Frederica, Delaware. Spring Creek then flows southeast to meet the Murderkill River at Frederica, Delaware.

== Watershed ==
Spring Creek drains 27.95 square miles (72.4 km^{2}) of area, receives about 44.5 in/year of precipitation, has a topographic wetness index of 576.55 and is about 8.4% forested.

== See also ==
- List of Delaware rivers
