= Frederica Historic District =

Historic district in Delaware, United States

- U.S. National Register of Historic Places
- U.S. Historic district
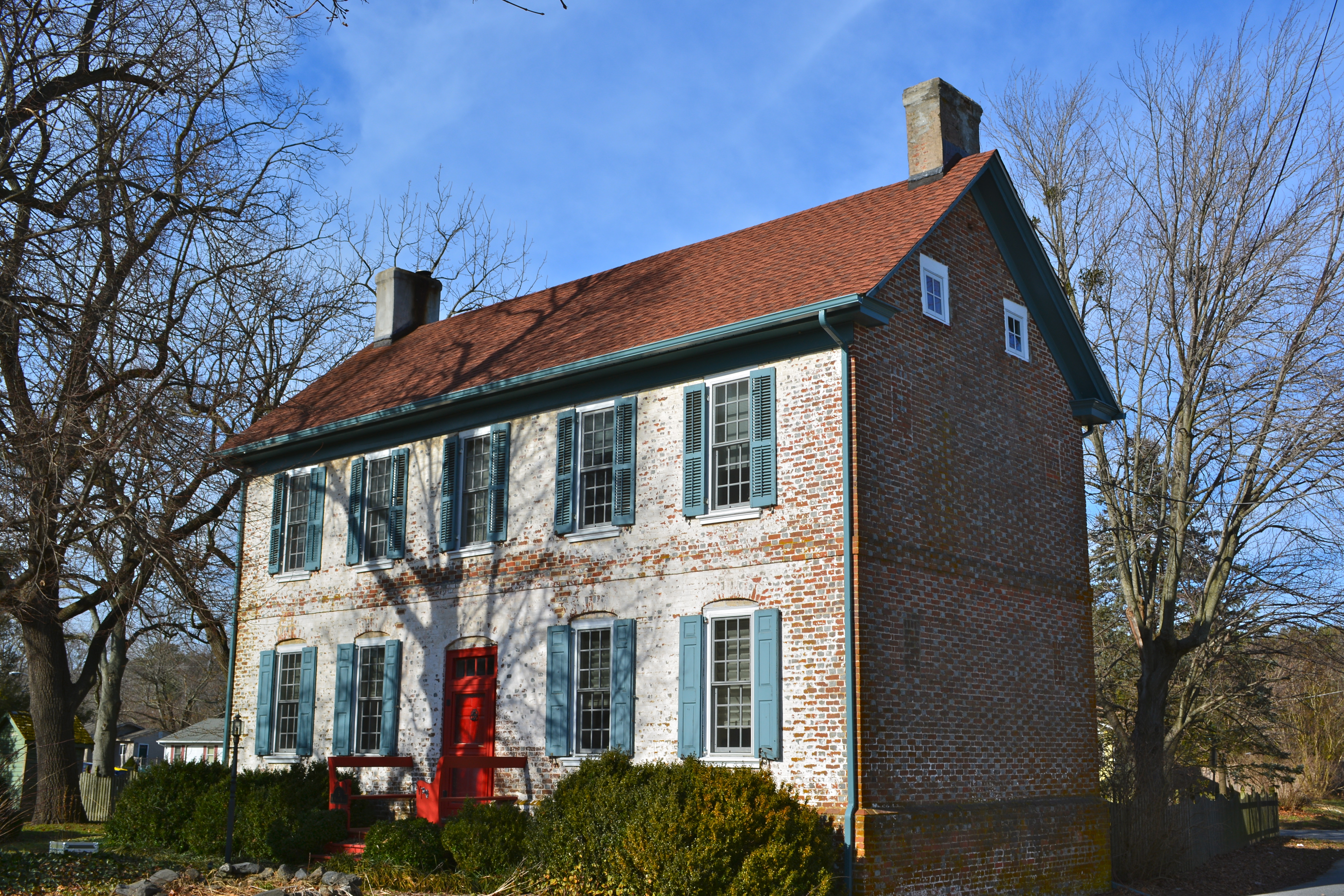
- Hathorn House, c. 1750

- Location within Delaware Location within the United States
- Location: Market, Front, and David Sts., Frederica, Delaware
- Coordinates: 39°00′27″N 75°28′03″W
- Area: 25 acres (10 ha)
- Built: c. 1750
- Architectural style: Greek Revival, Italianate, Federal
- NRHP reference No.: 77000385
- Added to NRHP: November 9, 1977

The Frederica Historic District is a national historic district located at Frederica, Kent County, Delaware. It encompasses 118 contributing buildings in the town of Frederica. The oldest buildings date to the middle of the 18th century. The district includes a number of 18th and 19th century commercial and residential buildings in a variety of popular architectural styles including Greek Revival, Italianate, and Federal. Notable buildings include Trinity Methodist Church (1856), Robbins Hardware Store, the Hathorn House, Wootten Store, John Dill Store, Robert Dill House, firehouse, post office, and the Governor Hall House (1828, c. 1861), the home of Delaware Governor John W. Hall (1817-1892).

It was listed on the National Register of Historic Places in 1977.

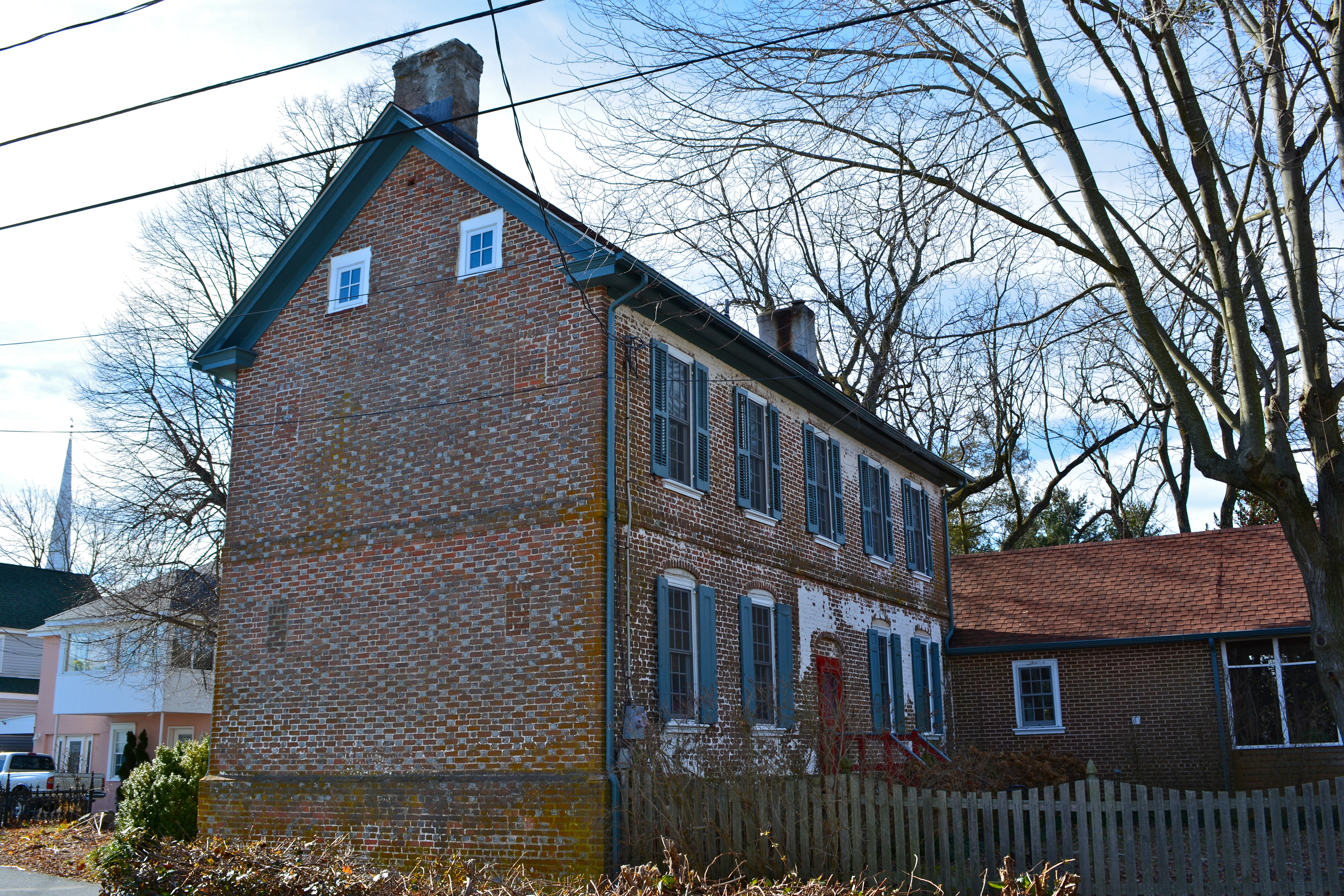
Rear of Hathorn House

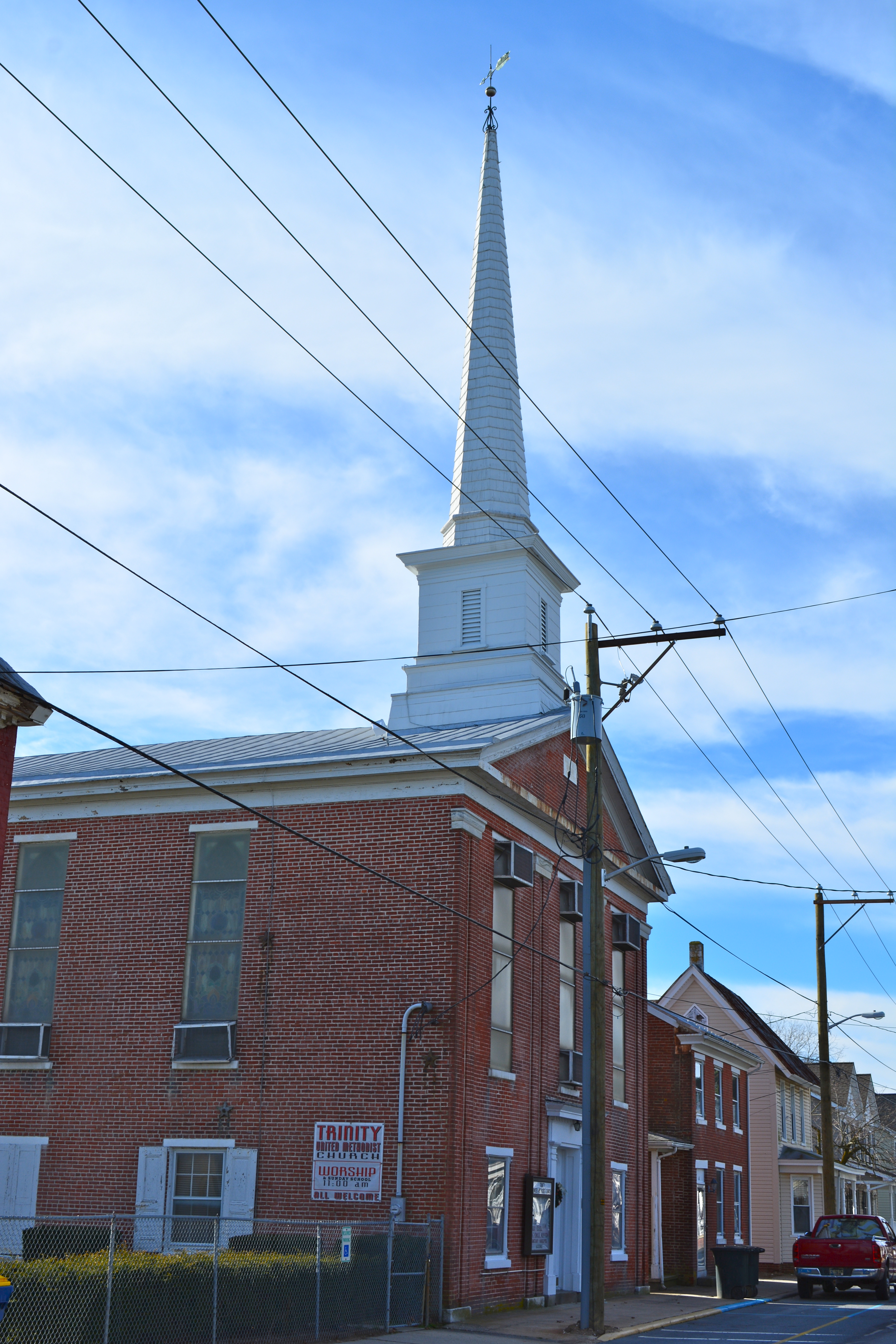
Trinity United Methodist Church

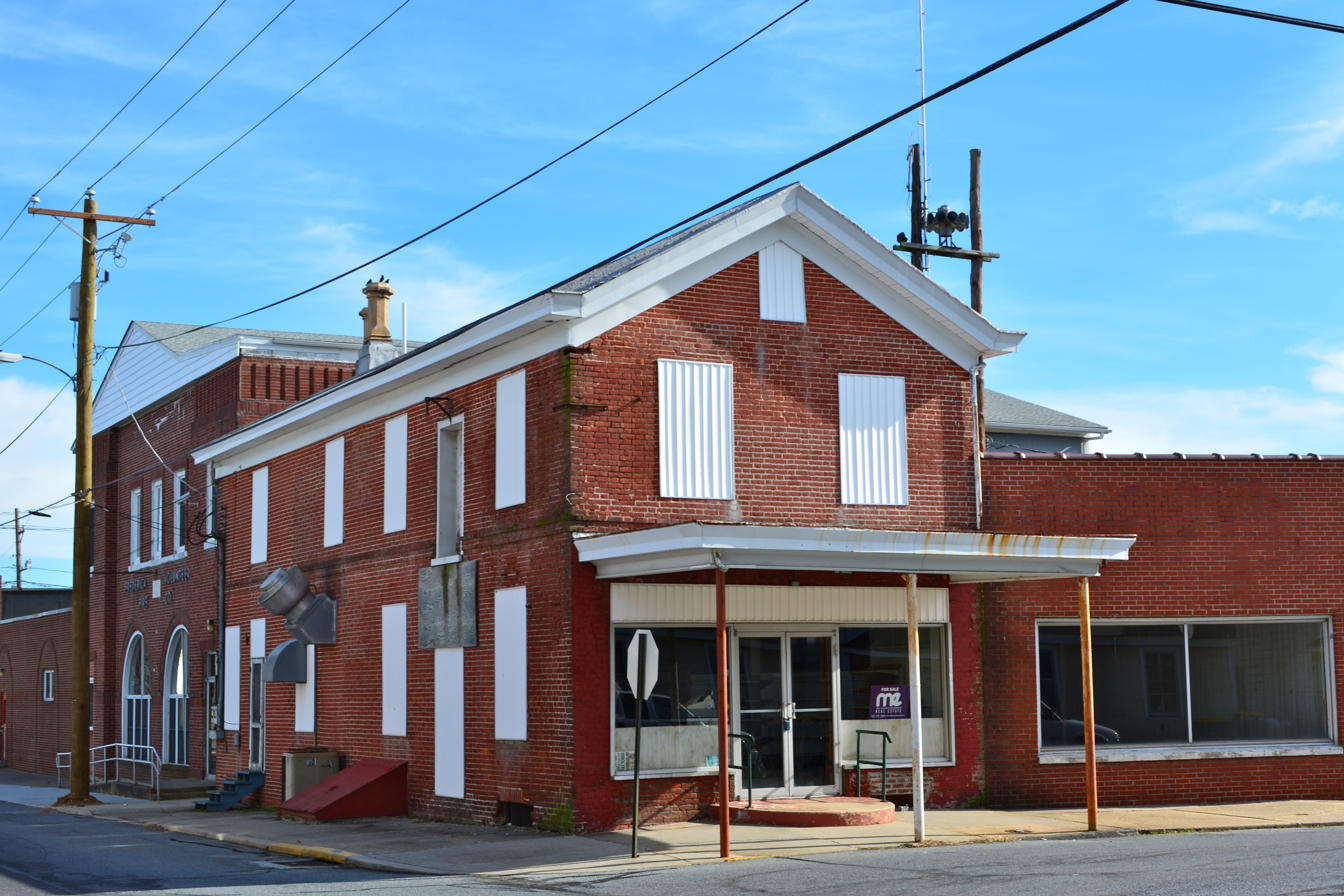
John Dill Store

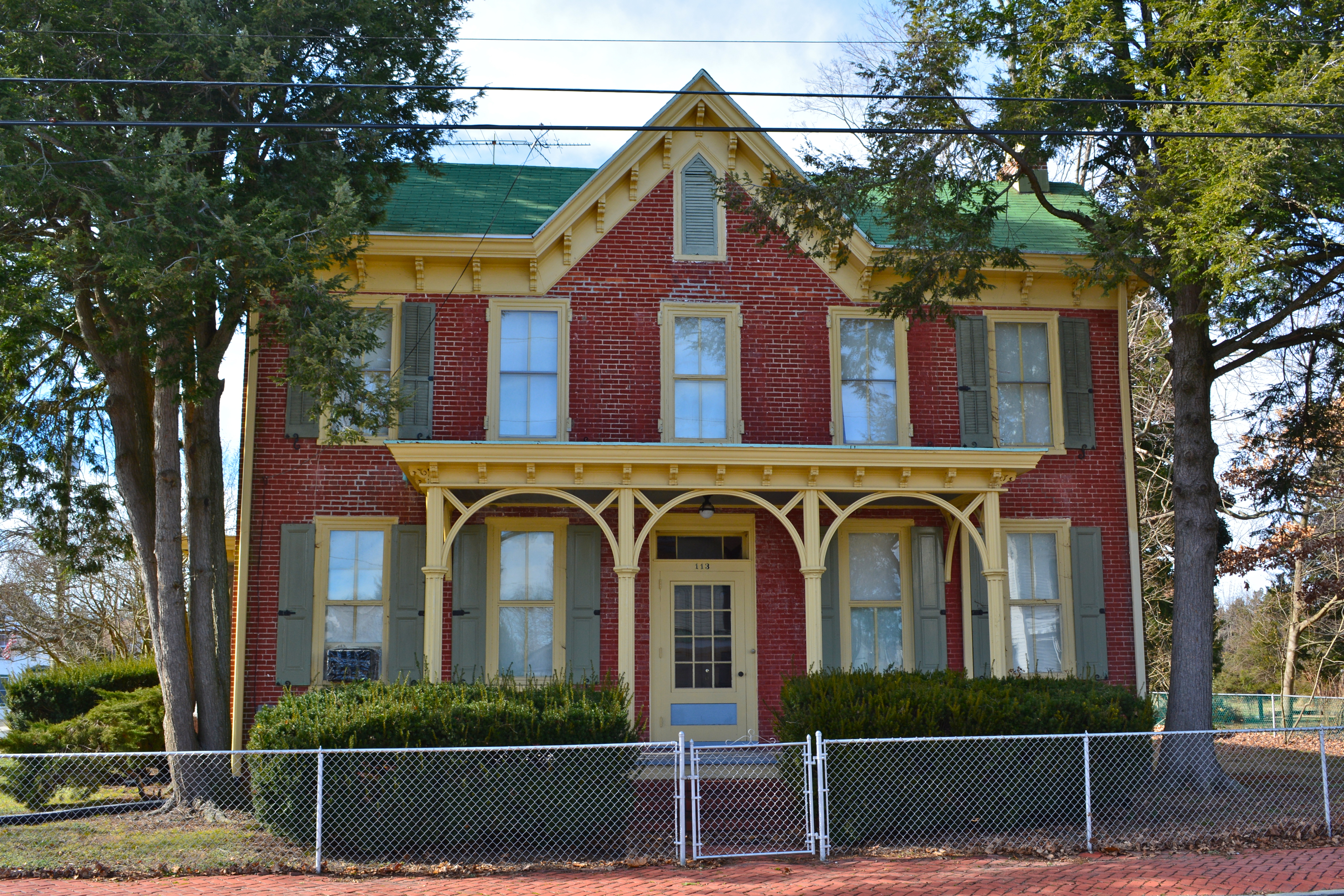
113 Market Street

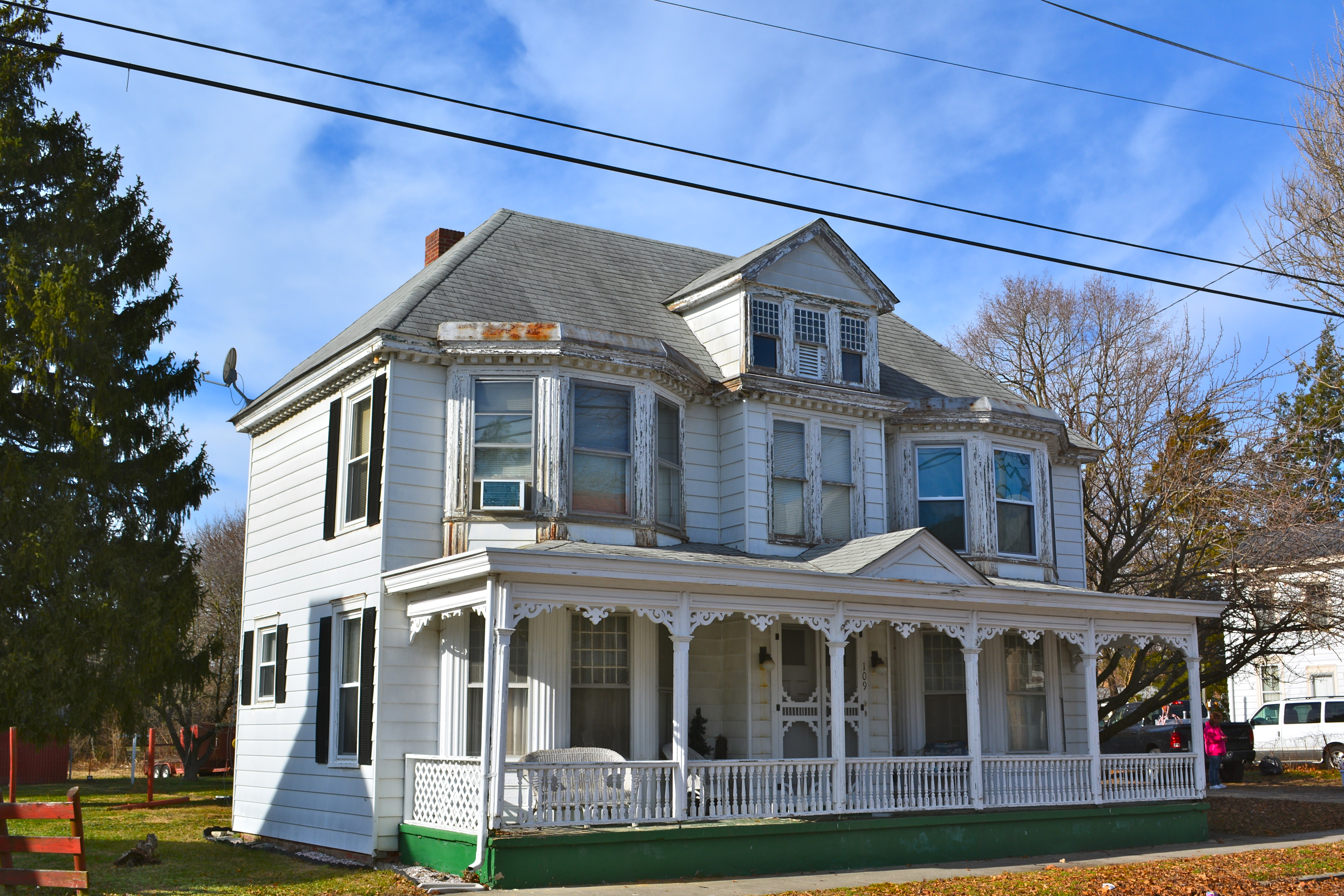
109 Market Street
