= Island Field Site =

Archaeological site in Delaware, United States

- U.S. National Register of Historic Places
- Nearest city: Dover, Delaware
- NRHP reference No.: 72000283
- Added to NRHP: February 1, 1972

The Island Field Site (7K-F-17) is a major archaeological site in Kent County, Delaware, United States. The site is located in South Bowers, just south of the Murderkill River near where it empties into Delaware Bay. The site was a major prehistoric Native American village site, which was most notable for its cemetery. The site was first identified in the 1920s during road work, and was excavated in the 1950s-60s, after which the area was eventually built up to include a museum. In 1986 members of the local Nanticoke tribe protested the display and removal for research of burial remains at the site.

The site was listed on the National Register of Historic Places in 1972.

== See also ==
- National Register of Historic Places listings in Kent County, Delaware
