= Mordington (Frederica, Delaware) =

Historic house in Delaware, United States

- U.S. National Register of Historic Places
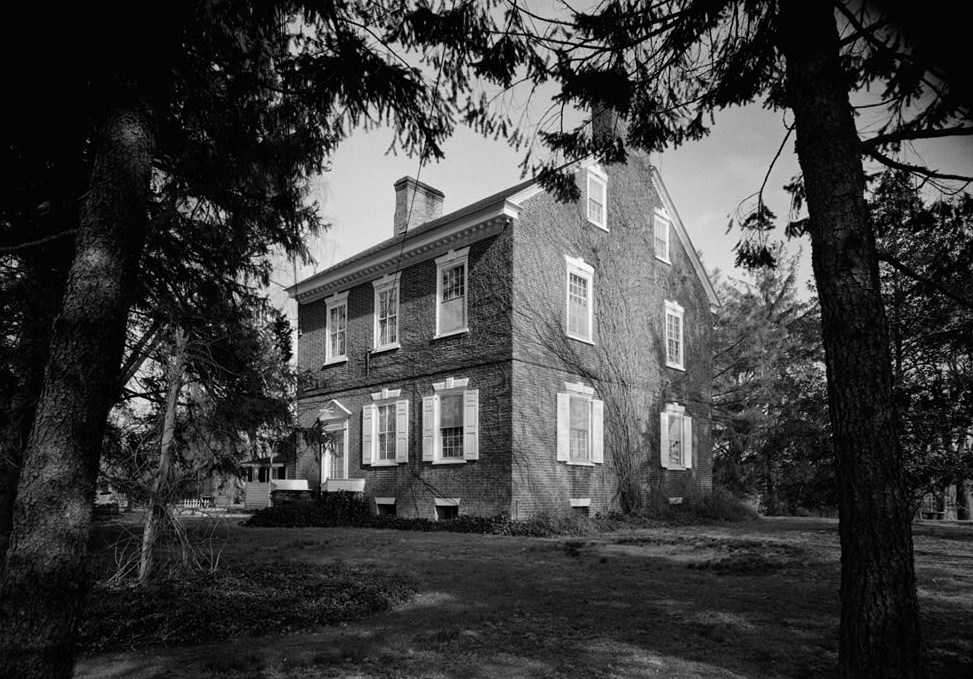
- Mordington, HABS Photo, May 1960

- Location within Delaware Location within the United States
- Location: South of Frederica on Canterbury Rd., near Frederica, Delaware
- Coordinates: 38°58′7″N 75°29′39″W
- Area: 5 acres (2.0 ha)
- Built: 1785
- Architectural style: Georgian
- NRHP reference No.: 73000494
- Added to NRHP: April 13, 1973

Mordington, also known as the Douqlass House, is a historic home located near Frederica, Kent County, Delaware. It dates to about 1785, and is a 2 1/2-story, three-bay, double-pile plan, brick dwelling in the Georgian-style. It has a lower frame and brick wing to the east that was replaced in the late 1960s. The original two main doorways and most of the original interior woodwork were removed to the Winterthur Museum and Country Estate.

It was listed on the National Register of Historic Places in 1973.
