= Fourteen Foot Bank Light =

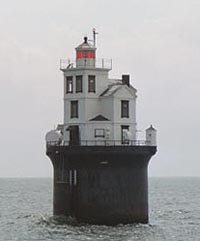
- Fourteen Foot Bank Light
- Location: near Bowers Beach Delaware Bay, Delaware
- Coordinates: 39.0482°N 75.1836°W

Tower
- Constructed: 1886
- Foundation: Cast Iron and Concrete Caisson
- Construction: Cast Iron
- Automated: 1972
- Height: 40 feet (12 m)
- Shape: Square
- Heritage: National Register of Historic Places listed place

Light
- First lit: 1888
- Focal height: 59 feet (18 m)
- Lens: Fourth order Fresnel lens
- Range: 13 nmi (24 km; 15 mi) (white), 10 nmi (19 km; 12 mi) (red)
- Characteristic: white flash every 9 s, red sector covers nearby shoal
- Fourteen Foot Bank Light
- U.S. National Register of Historic Places
- NRHP reference No.: 89000286
- Added to NRHP: March 27, 1989

Fourteen Foot Bank Light is a lighthouse in the Delaware Bay near Bowers Beach, Delaware. Built in 1885–1886 at the south end of Joe Flogger Shoal, it was the first lighthouse to be built using a pneumatic caisson. The wooden caisson structure was excavated to a depth of 23 feet (7.0 m) below the seabed, then filled with 2,000 cubic yards (1,500 m^{3}) of concrete. A cast-iron base was meanwhile erected on the caisson as it sank. A house-like structure was built on top of the base, designed by H.A. Ramsay and Son of Baltimore. Engineers for the structure were Anderson and Barr, and the contractor was D.P. Heap.

The light is 11 miles (18 km) offshore, and therefore not visible from land. It was added to the National Register of Historic Places in 1989.
