= Bonwell House =

Historic house in Delaware, United States

- U.S. National Register of Historic Places
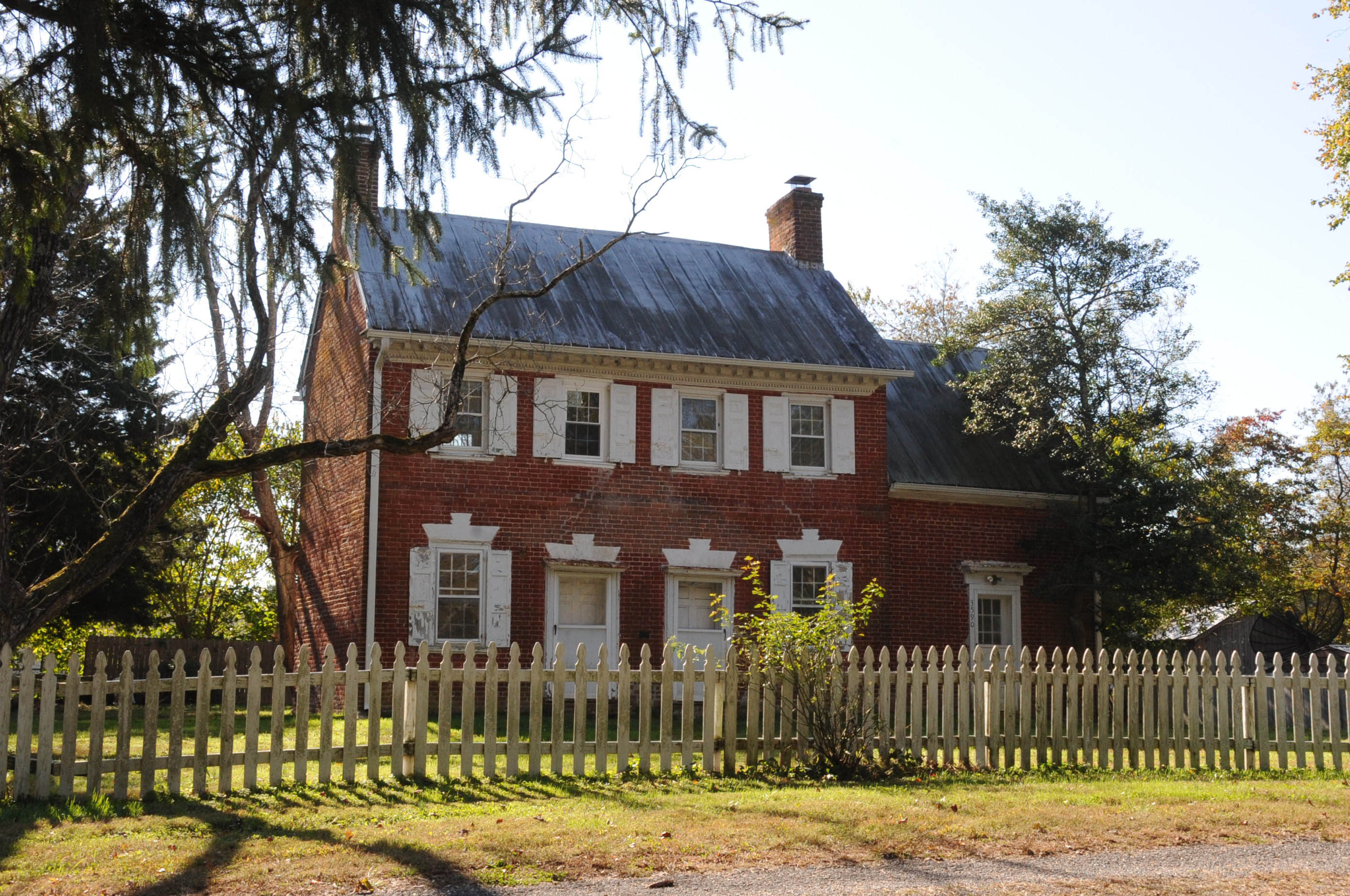

- Location within Delaware Location within the United States
- Location: 4 miles west of Frederica on Road 380, near Frederica, Delaware
- Coordinates: 39°1′23″N 75°30′34″W
- Area: 1 acre (0.40 ha)
- Built: 1747
- NRHP reference No.: 73000493
- Added to NRHP: March 20, 1973

Bonwell House is a historic home located near Frederica, Kent County, Delaware. It dates to the mid-18th century, and is a two-story plus attic, four bay, brick dwelling. It has a lower west wing. Bonwell House was the nucleus of a group of mills called the Leamington Mills.

It was listed on the National Register of Historic Places in 1973.
