= Saxton United Methodist Church =

Historic church in Delaware, United States

- U.S. National Register of Historic Places
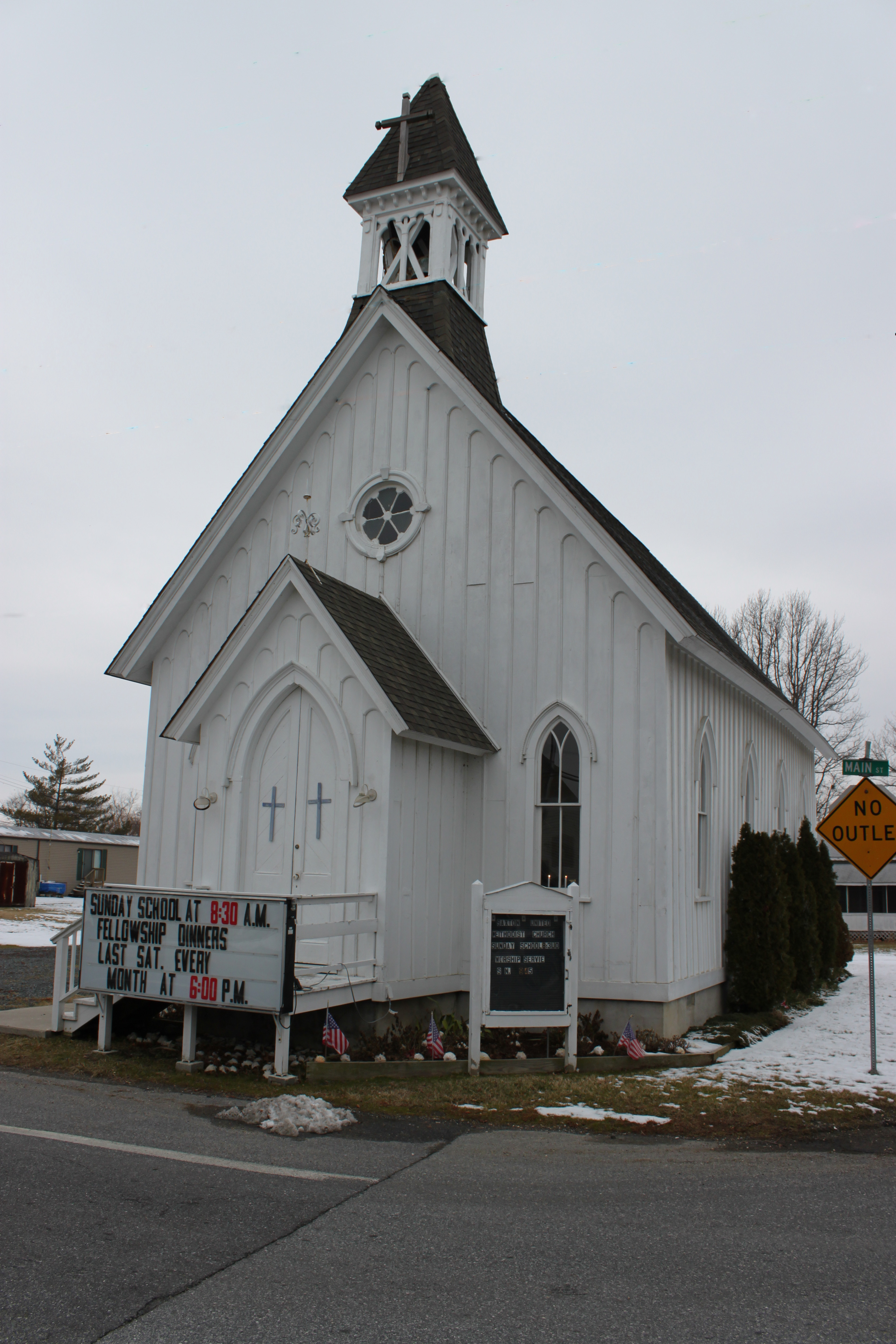
- Saxton United Methodist Church, January 2000

- Location within Delaware Location within the United States
- Location: 3419 Main Street, Bowers, Delaware
- Coordinates: 39°3′30″N 75°24′14″W
- Area: 0.5 acres (0.20 ha)
- Built: 1879, 1893
- Architect: Godwin, George
- Architectural style: Gothic Revival
- NRHP reference No.: 90001070
- Added to NRHP: July 23, 1990

Saxton United Methodist Church is a historic United Methodist church located at the junction of Main and Church Streets in Bowers, Kent County, Delaware. It was built in 1879, and is a long, narrow, one-story, gable-roofed, Gothic-influenced frame building with board-and-batten siding. It measures approximately 40 feet, 5 inches, in length by 24 feet, 5 inches, in width. The steeply pitched roof is topped by a pyramidal-roofed, bell cupola. The church was moved to its present location in 1893.

It was added to the National Register of Historic Places in 1990.
