= Bowers, Delaware =

Bowers, Delaware Bowers Beach
- Town
- Flag Seal

- Location of Bowers in Kent County, Delaware.

- Location within the state of Delaware Bowers (the United States)
- Coordinates: 39°03′35″N 75°24′05″W
- Country: United States
- State: Delaware
- County: Kent

Area
  - Total: 0.32 sq mi (0.83 km^{2})
  - Land: 0.31 sq mi (0.81 km^{2})
  - Water: 0.0077 sq mi (0.02 km^{2})
- Elevation: 3 ft (0.91 m)

Population (2020)
  - Total: 278
  - Density: 892.6/sq mi (344.63/km^{2})
- Time zone: UTC−5 (Eastern (EST))
  - Summer (DST): UTC−4 (EDT)
- ZIP code: 19946
- Area code: 302
- FIPS code: 10-07250
- GNIS feature ID: 213692
- Website: bowersbeach.delaware.gov

Bowers (commonly known as Bowers Beach) is a town in Kent County, Delaware, United States. It is part of the Dover metropolitan area. According to the 2020 census, its population was 278.

== History ==
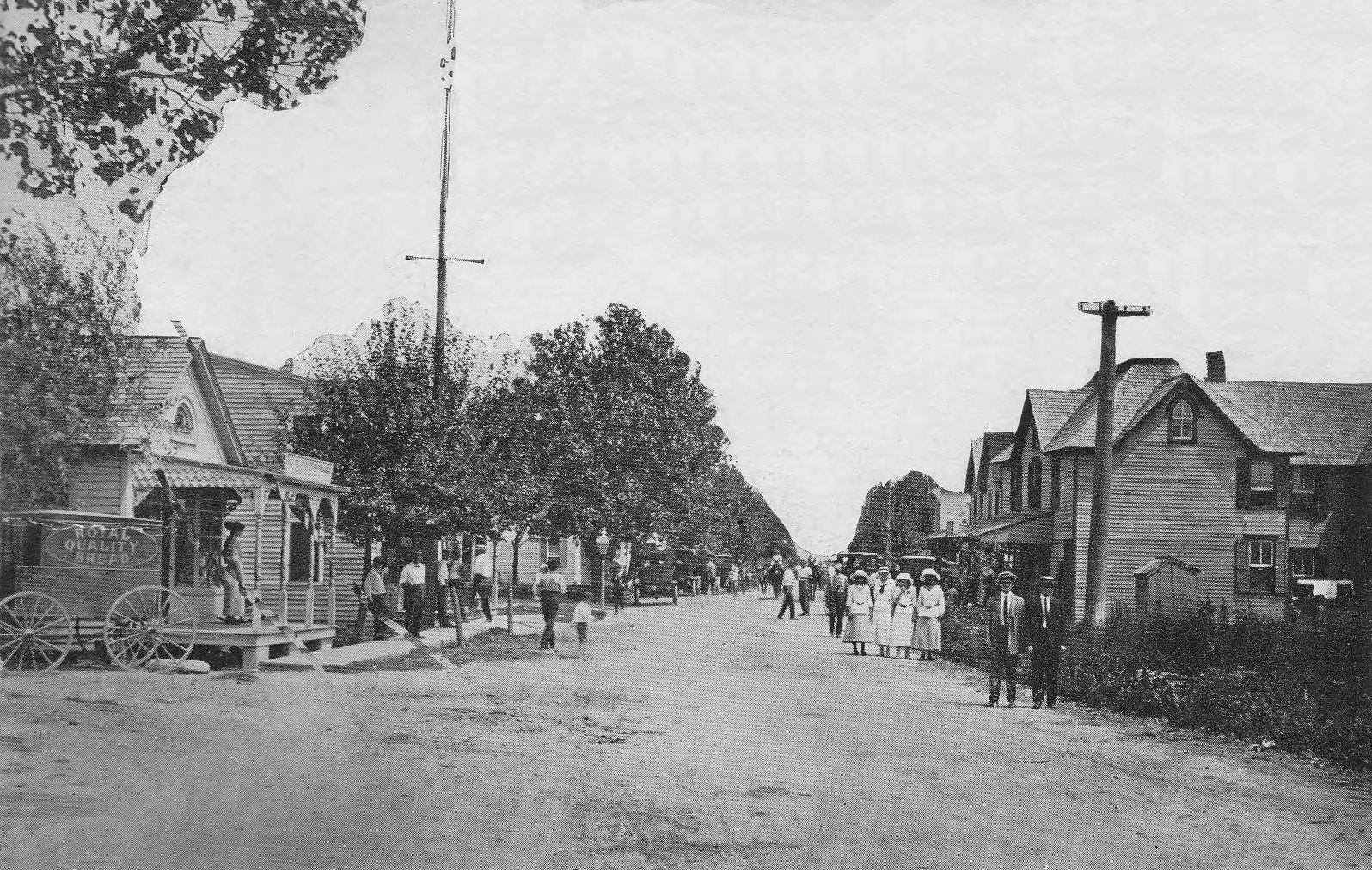
Main Street, 1914

Bowers Beach was originally settled in the late 1600s and was named Whitwell's Delight by Francis Whitwell. The land was acquired by William Frampton in 1685 and was called Dover Peers. After Frampton died, the land was sold to William Bassett. Eventually, 420 acres of Whitwell's Delight belonged to Nathaniel and Mary Hunn. After Nathaniel Hunn died in 1734, his children sold the land to John Bowers and the land along the Delaware Bay between the St. Jones River and Murderkill River became known as Bowers Beach starting on August 16, 1734. The land later belonged to John Bowers' son and then his granddaughter, with the latter being the last person in the Bowers family to own the land. Part of the land was acquired by John Booth in 1750, who sold it later in the year to Benjamin Chew. By the 1800s, the properties in Bowers Beach were owned by Joseph Wood. The properties were later sold to multiple owners.

Bowers' population was 150 in 1890, and was 146 in 1900.

On March 9, 1907, Bowers was incorporated. In 1962, the settlement was reincorporated as the Town of Bowers.

Throughout its history, Bowers Beach was a major fishing town along the Delaware Bay and once saw an average of 300 boats at the docks. Today, people come to Bowers Beach for fishing, swimming, birdwatching, kayaking, sailing, and the beaches along the Delaware Bay.

The Fourteen Foot Bank Light and Saxton United Methodist Church are listed on the National Register of Historic Places.

== Geography ==
According to the United States Census Bureau, the town has a total area of 0.3 square miles (0.78 km^{2}), of which 0.3 square miles (0.78 km^{2}) is land and 3.33% is water.

Bowers Beach is situated along the Delaware Bay between the St. Jones River to the north and the Murderkill River to the south.

== Demographics ==
Historical population
| Census | Pop. | Note | %± |
|---|---|---|---|
| 1910 | 212 | | — |
| 1920 | 174 | | −17.9% |
| 1930 | 246 | | 41.4% |
| 1940 | 328 | | 33.3% |
| 1950 | 284 | | −13.4% |
| 1960 | 324 | | 14.1% |
| 1970 | 268 | | −17.3% |
| 1980 | 198 | | −26.1% |
| 1990 | 179 | | −9.6% |
| 2000 | 305 | | 70.4% |
| 2010 | 335 | | 9.8% |
| 2020 | 278 | | −17.0% |
U.S. Decennial Census

As of the census of 2000, there were 305 people, 138 households, and 81 families residing in the town. The population density was 1,063.4 inhabitants per square mile (410.6/km^{2}). There were 224 housing units at an average density of 781.0 units per square mile (301.5 units/km^{2}). The racial makeup of the town was 91.48% White, 5.25% African American, 0.98% Asian, 0.33% from other races, and 1.97% from two or more races.

There were 138 households, out of which 21.7% had children under the age of 18 living with them, 44.9% were married couples living together, 11.6% had a female householder with no husband present, and 41.3% were non-families. 29.0% of all households were made up of individuals, and 13.0% had someone living alone who was 65 years of age or older. The average household size was 2.21 and the average family size was 2.74.

In the town, the population was spread out, with 20.7% under the age of 18, 7.5% from 18 to 24, 31.8% from 25 to 44, 23.3% from 45 to 64, and 16.7% who were 65 years of age or older. The median age was 39 years. For every 100 females, there were 96.8 males. For every 100 females age 18 and over, there were 89.1 males.

The median income for a household in the town was $37,031, and the median income for a family was $45,625. Males had a median income of $29,500 versus $23,594 for females. The per capita income for the town was $21,404. About 10.6% of families and 12.0% of the population were below the poverty line, including 25.9% of those under the age of eighteen and 15.1% of those 65 or over.

== Infrastructure ==
=== Transportation ===
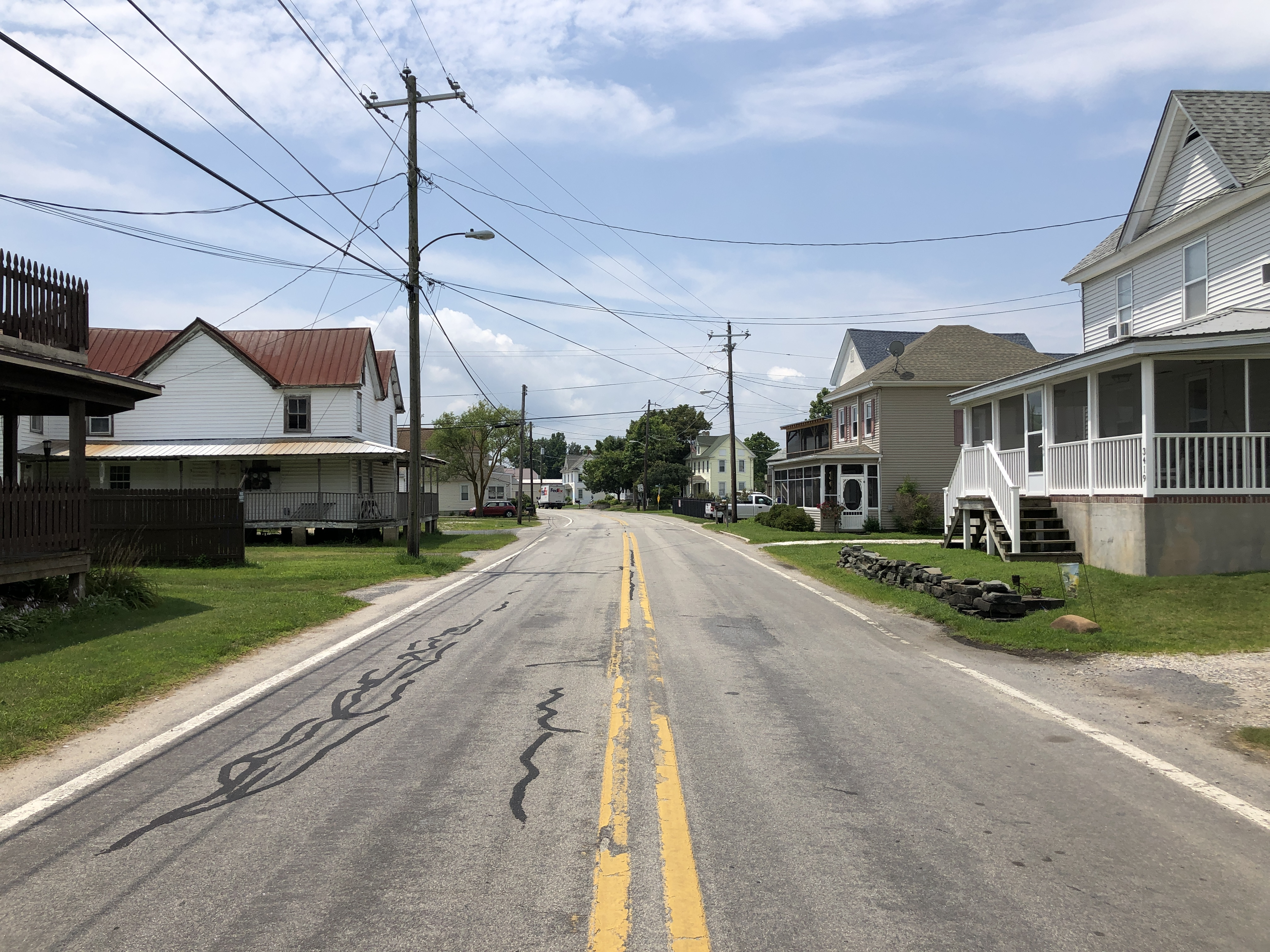
Main Street in 2022

Road access to Bowers Beach is provided by Bowers Beach Road, which leads west to an interchange with Delaware Route 1 in Little Heaven. DE 1 heads north toward Dover and Wilmington and south toward Milford and the Delaware Beaches.

=== Utilities ===
Delmarva Power, a subsidiary of Exelon, provides electricity to Bowers Beach. Chesapeake Utilities provides natural gas to the town. Trash and recycling collection in Bowers Beach is provided under contract by Waste Industries.

== Education ==
Bowers is within the Lake Forest School District. The zoned high school is Lake Forest High School.
