= Killens Pond State Park =

State park in Delaware, United States

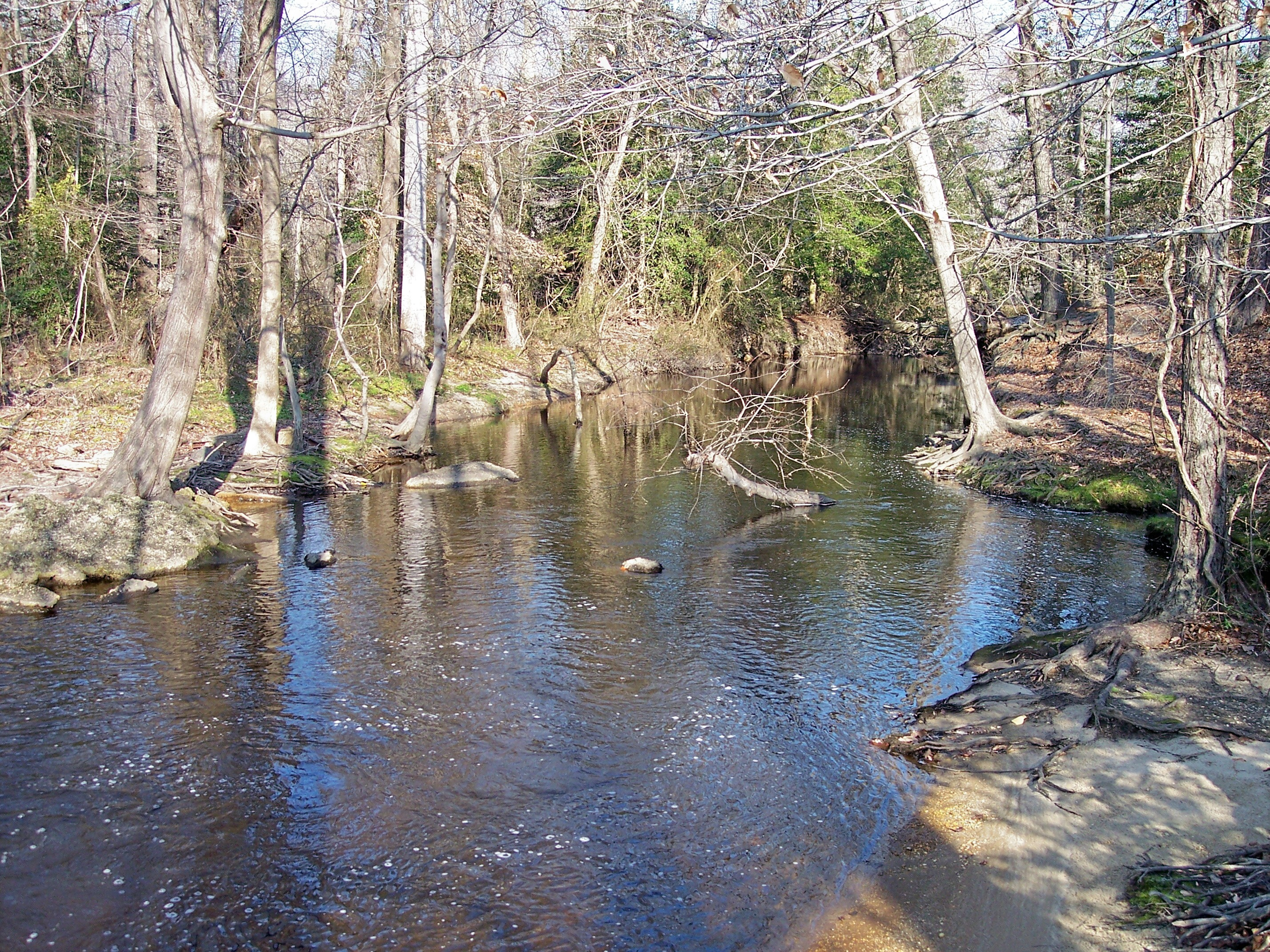
- The Murderkill River in Killens Pond State Park

- Location within Delaware Location within the United States
- Location: Kent County, Delaware, United States
- Coordinates: 38°58′53″N 75°32′10″W
- Area: 1,493.70 acres (604.48 ha)
- Elevation: 16 feet (4.9 m)
- Established: 1965
- Administrator: Delaware Department of Natural Resources and Environmental Control
- Website: Official website

Killens Pond State Park is a Delaware state park located south of the town of Felton in Kent County, Delaware in the United States. The park surrounds a 75-acre (30 ha) pond known as Killens Pond located along the Murderkill River. Amenities include boating, fishing, hiking, playgrounds, picnic areas, nature center, campgrounds, and a water park.

== History ==
Killens Pond State Park on the Murderkill River was previously the site of a millpond and the location of several Native American hunting camps and homes. The millpond was built in the late 18th century. The state park was opened to the public in 1965.

== Recreation ==
Killens Pond State Park is opened for year-round recreation and features a waterpark, Killens Pond Water Park. Killens Pond and the Murderkill River are open to fishing and boating. Common game fish include bass, crappie, bluegill, catfish, perch and pickerel. Canoes, rowboats, kayaks and pedal boats are permitted on the pond and the river is the site of the Murderkill River Canoe Trail.

The park offers 9 miles (14 km) of trails for hiking, biking, cross-country skiing and cross-country running, an 18-hole disc golf, ball fields, playing courts and a bike path that follows the main park entrance from U.S. Route 13.
