= Browns Branch =

Stream in the American state of Missouri

Coordinates: 38°31′44″N 90°57′32″W

Browns Branch is a stream in Franklin County in the U.S. state of Missouri. It is a tributary of Dubois Creek.

Browns Branch has the name of a pioneer citizen.

== See also ==
- List of rivers of Missouri
