= Murderkill River =

River flowing in Delaware, United States

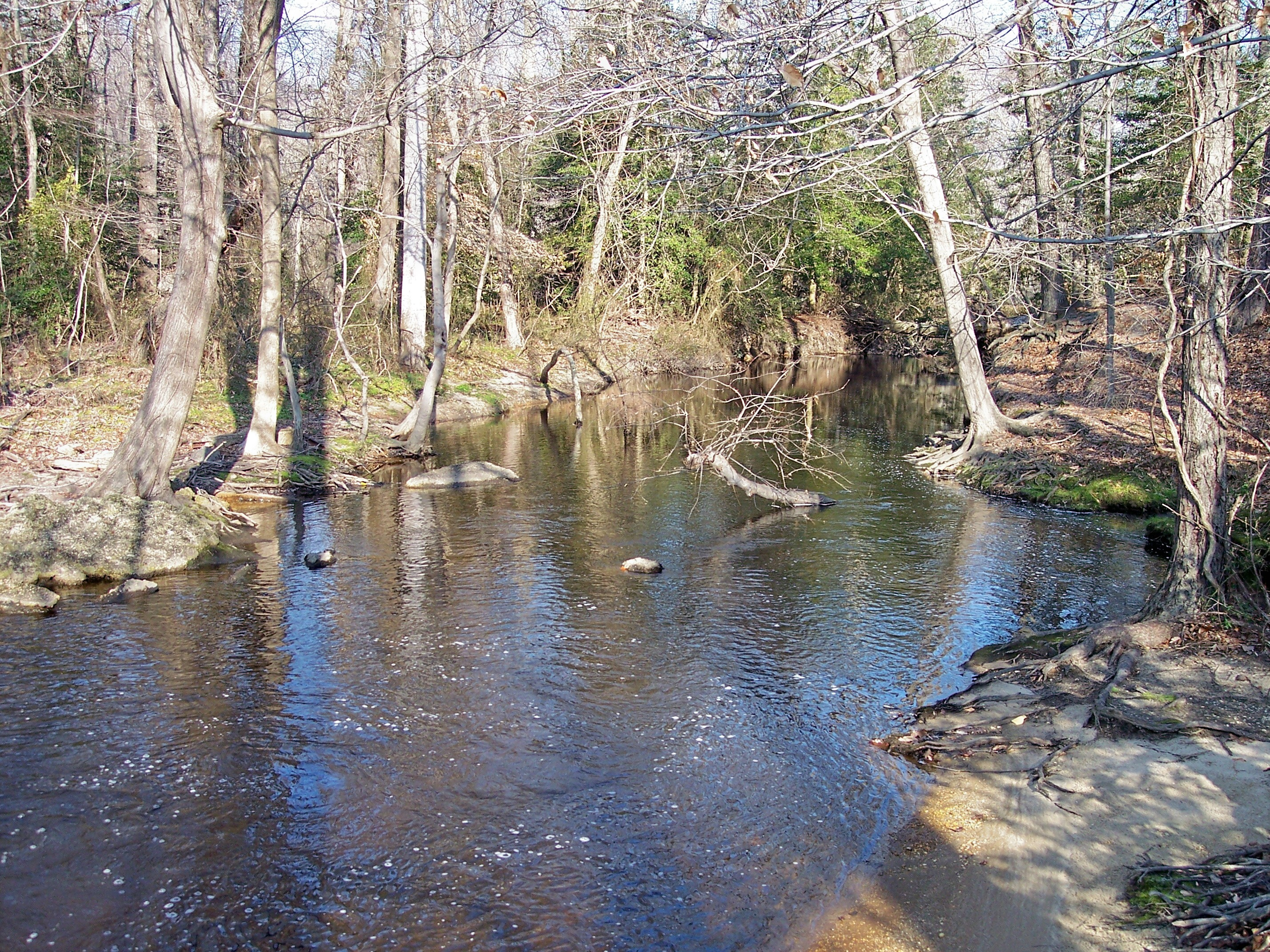
- The Murderkill River downstream of Killens Pond in 2006

- Location of the mouth of the Murderkill River Murderkill River (the United States)

Location
- Country: United States
- State: Delaware
- County: Kent

Physical characteristics
- Source
  - location: near Felton
  - coordinates: 39°01′03″N 75°35′31″W
- Mouth: Delaware Bay
  - location: Bowers
  - coordinates: 39°03′30″N 75°23′48″W
  - elevation: 3 ft (0.91 m)
- Length: 22 mi (35 km)
- Basin size: 106 sq mi (270 km^{2})
- Discharge
  - location: mouth
  - average: 122.8 cu ft/s (3.48 m^{3}/s) (estimate)

Basin features
- Progression: Delaware Bay → Atlantic Ocean
- Tributaries
  - left: Fan Branch; Spring Branch; Ash Gut; Spring Creek
  - right: Beaverdam Branch; Black Swamp Creek; Browns Branch
- Waterbodies: Killen Pond; Coursey Pond

The Murderkill River is a river flowing to Delaware Bay in central Delaware in the United States. It is approximately 21.7 miles (34.9 km) long and drains an area of 106 square miles (270 km^{2}) on the Atlantic Coastal Plain.

The Murderkill flows for its entire length in southern Kent County. It rises just west of Felton and flows generally east-northeastwardly, through Killen Pond (site of Killens Pond State Park) and Coursey Pond, under Carpenters Bridge, and past Frederica to Bowers, where it enters Delaware Bay about 0.5 miles (1 km) south of the mouth of the St. Jones River. The Murderkill River is tidally influenced from its mouth upstream to just past Frederica, and is considered by the U.S. Army Corps of Engineers to be navigable for the lower 10 miles (16 km) of its course.

According to 2002 data from the United States Environmental Protection Agency, 55% of the area of the Murderkill River's watershed is occupied by agricultural uses; 17% is forested; 14% is urban; 9% is wetland; and 2% is water.

== Origin of name ==
One description of the river's naming was recorded in 1945 by George R. Stewart, but is now considered to be a folk tale:

...remembering how they had been served at the Whore-Kill, they went some ten or twelve miles higher, where they landed again and traded with the Indians, trusting the Indians to come onto their stores ashore, and likewise aboard their sloop drinking and debauching with the Indians until they were at last barbarously murdered, and so that place was christened with their blood and to this day is called the Murderer-Kill, that is, Murderers Creek.

— George R. Stewart, Names on the Land: A Historical Account of Place-Naming in the United States

Dick Carter, Chair of the Delaware Heritage Commission, states that the name of Murderkill River is taken from the original Dutch for Mother River. Mother is moeder in Dutch, and river is Kille. Later, under British rule, the word "River" was added to the waterway's name, effectively making it "mother river river." The term "kill" is used in areas of Dutch influence in the Netherlands' former North American colony of New Netherland, primarily the Hudson and Delaware Valleys to describe a creek, river, tidal inlet, strait, or arm of the sea, such as Bronx Kill in New York and Schuylkill River in Pennsylvania.

The Delaware Department of Natural Resources and Environmental Control, however, says, "[t]he name first appears in 1654 as Mordane Kijhlen, Swedish for 'the murderer’s creek,'" so there appears to be some connection to a homicide.

Delaware's creeks and rivers are slow-moving and there is deep mud associated with marshy rivers. Dutch "modder" = mud, a false cognate to "mother." Modder Kill = Muddy Creek or Muddy River. The word is still used in Dutch, such as this Dutch video of a tractor stuck in mud ("vast in de modder").

Also, in New York there is Muddy Kill, with a clear connection to the older Dutch name.

== Variant names ==
According to the Geographic Names Information System, the Murderkill River has also been known historically as:

- Mordare Kijhlen (Swedish)
- Mother Creek
- Mother Kill
- Motherkill
- Motherkiln Creek
- Mothers Creek
- Murder Kill Creek
- Murther Creek
- Murtherkill

== Notable events ==
On June 30, 2020, two brothers, Kevin and Zion George, drowned in Murderkill River near South Bowers. The incident occurred when a group of four, including the brothers, were swimming during low tide, when they were carried away by a tidal current. An unknown person was able to pull away two members of the group, but the brothers were pulled underwater before they could be reached. The state police received a report of the incident around 3 pm, and a search was started the same day. The brothers were found on the morning of the next day.

== See also ==
- List of Delaware rivers
- Kill (body of water)
