= Frederica, Delaware =

- Town
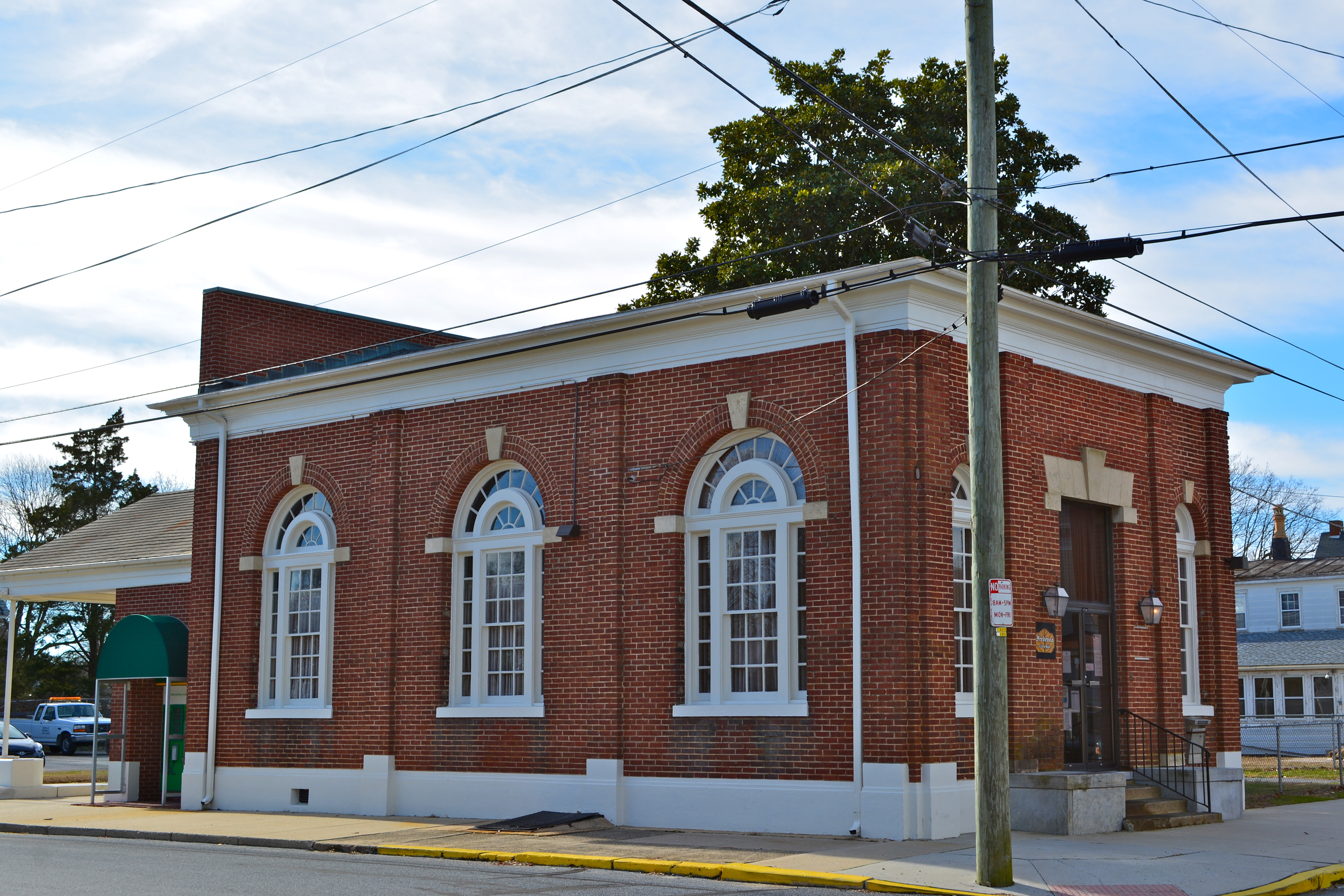
- Town Hall

- Seal
- Nickname: Frogtown
- Location of Frederica in Kent County, Delaware.

- Location within the state of Delaware Frederica (the United States)
- Coordinates: 39°00′32″N 75°27′57″W
- Country: United States
- State: Delaware
- County: Kent

Government
  - Type: Council-manager
  - Mayor: William Glanden

Area
  - Total: 1.74 sq mi (4.51 km^{2})
  - Land: 1.74 sq mi (4.51 km^{2})
  - Water: 0 sq mi (0.00 km^{2})
- Elevation: 16 ft (4.9 m)

Population (2020)
  - Total: 1,073
  - Density: 616.3/sq mi (237.95/km^{2})
- Time zone: UTC−5 (Eastern (EST))
  - Summer (DST): UTC−4 (EDT)
- ZIP code: 19946
- Area code: 302
- FIPS code: 10-28440
- GNIS feature ID: 213981
- Website: Frederica, Delaware

Frederica is a town in Kent County, Delaware, United States. It is part of the Dover metropolitan area. The population was 1,073 in 2020. ILC Dover, the company which manufactured the spacesuits for the Apollo and Skylab astronauts of the 1960s and 1970s, along with fabricating the suit component of the Space Shuttle's Extravehicular Mobility Unit (EMU), is located nearby.

== History ==
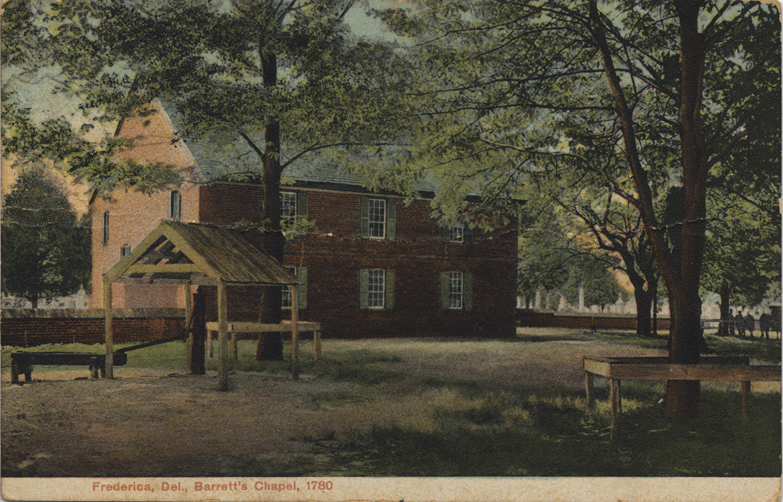
Barratt's Chapel, circa 1780

The present-day town of Frederica was part of a land grant to Boneny Bishop by William Penn in 1681. The location at a bend along the Murderkill River was originally known as Indian Point and later became known as Johnny Cake Landing. The waterfront was surveyed in 1758 and the area where most shipping activity occurred became known as Goforth's Landing.

The remainder of the town was surveyed and laid out by Jonathan Emerson in 1772. In 1796, the community was renamed from Johnny Cake Landing to Frederica Landing at the request of one of Emerson's daughters, as she believed the name Johnny Cake Landing was a rather unceremonious, informal name and inappropriate for a settlement close to Barratt's Chapel, a major landmark for Methodism. (See Johnnycake.) The Town of Frederica was incorporated by the state in 1826. The incorporation act for Frederica was repealed in 1855, only for the town to be reincorporated in 1865.

Frederica was built along the Murderkill River at a point it was still navigable, 6 miles (9.7 km) from the Delaware Bay. The town was surrounded by wetlands, leading to the nickname "Frogtown" for the large number of frogs that live in the wetlands. Frederica developed as a shipping and shipbuilding center due to its location along the navigable Murderkill River; shipping and shipbuilding would dominate the town's economy for several decades. The town was linked by water to other Kent County towns along with the city of Philadelphia, and its fortunes depended on its water connections to these places as roads were often impassable at the time. Important cargo shipped along the Murderkill River in Frederica's early history included bacon, beef, corn, wheat flour, cedar shingles, cheese, butter, tar, pitch and hardwood boards.

In 1857, the Delaware Railroad was constructed across the state, leading to a decline in Frederica's status as a major shipping center. The railroad brought improved transportation across Kent County, diverting the shipment of goods away from the river ports. The shipping interests in Frederica fought against the construction of the Delaware Railroad near the town, which stopped the growth of the town and increased the isolation of Frederica from other towns. The Delaware Railroad was built well to the west of Frederica through Dover and Felton. The town later attempted to get a railroad connection by chartering a railroad line that would run from Dover to Milford via Frederica as well as pushing for a 7-mile (11 km) branch of the Delaware Railroad from Felton to Frederica; both efforts were unsuccessful.

The last shipyard in Frederica closed around 1890, but other industries would become prominent in Frederica. By 1887, the town had three canneries, with other businesses such as fertilizer manufacturing, a hat factory, two brush factories, a cooper, a butcher, a hotel, a clothing house, and ten general stores. A steamship operated by the Frederica and Philadelphia Navigation Company linked Frederica with Philadelphia until the onset of the Great Depression. In the 1920s, improvements to U.S. Route 113 that included a causeway into Frederica cut the town off from the Delaware Bay. Improved roads in the 20th century would provide better connections with Harrington, Dover, and Wilmington, reducing the need for the steamship to Philadelphia. Maritime activity in Frederica declined, the port quieted down, and the canneries and many businesses in the town closed. U.S. Route 113 was rerouted to bypass Frederica to the east along what is now Delaware Route 1. Today, Frederica is a quiet town that has not experienced much change unlike many places in the United States.

The Frederica Historic District is listed on the National Register of Historic Places as are several nearby buildings in Kent County including Barratt Hall, Barratt's Chapel, Bonwell House, and Mordington.

== Geography ==
Frederica is located at 39°00′32″N 75°27′57″W (39.0090017, –75.4657542).

According to the United States Census Bureau, the town has a total area of 0.8 square miles (2.1 km^{2}), all land.

Due to the marsh surrounding Murderkill River to the south of town, residents often have to deal with a very strong odor on hot summer days. Also, several of the roads heading to the south and north out of town to DE 1 are frequently flooded during very high tides and heavy rains.

=== Climate ===
The climate in this area is characterized by hot, humid summers and generally mild to cool winters. According to the Köppen Climate Classification system, Frederica has a humid subtropical climate, abbreviated "Cfa" on climate maps.

Climate data for Frederica, Delaware
Month	Jan	Feb	Mar	Apr	May	Jun	Jul	Aug	Sep	Oct	Nov	Dec	Year
Record high °F (°C)	76 (24)	78 (26)	84 (29)	95 (35)	96 (36)	102 (39)	103 (39)	103 (39)	99 (37)	91 (33)	86 (30)	76 (24)	103 (39)
Mean daily maximum °F (°C)	43 (6)	45 (7)	54 (12)	64 (18)	73 (23)	82 (28)	87 (31)	85 (29)	78 (26)	68 (20)	58 (14)	48 (9)	65 (19)
Mean daily minimum °F (°C)	24 (−4)	25 (−4)	33 (1)	42 (6)	52 (11)	62 (17)	67 (19)	65 (18)	57 (14)	46 (8)	36 (2)	29 (−2)	45 (7)
Record low °F (°C)	−7 (−22)	−4 (−20)	4 (−16)	20 (−7)	30 (−1)	40 (4)	47 (8)	43 (6)	34 (1)	19 (−7)	13 (−11)	2 (−17)	−7 (−22)
Average precipitation inches (mm)	4.08 (104)	3.30 (84)	4.51 (115)	3.50 (89)	4.03 (102)	3.31 (84)	3.69 (94)	4.61 (117)	4.08 (104)	3.48 (88)	3.32 (84)	3.59 (91)	45.5 (1,156)
Source: The Weather Channel

== Demographics ==
Historical population
Census	Pop.	Note	%±
1870	588		—
1880	693		17.9%
1890	621		−10.4%
1900	706		13.7%
1910	659		−6.7%
1920	611		−7.3%
1930	589		−3.6%
1940	645		9.5%
1950	675		4.7%
1960	863		27.9%
1970	878		1.7%
1980	864		−1.6%
1990	761		−11.9%
2000	648		−14.8%
2010	774		19.4%
2020	1,073		38.6%
U.S. Decennial Census

=== 2020 census ===
As of the 2020 census, Frederica had a population of 1,073. The median age was 35.7 years. 25.1% of residents were under the age of 18 and 15.1% of residents were 65 years of age or older. For every 100 females there were 89.6 males, and for every 100 females age 18 and over there were 86.5 males age 18 and over.

0.0% of residents lived in urban areas, while 100.0% lived in rural areas.

There were 399 households in Frederica, of which 40.4% had children under the age of 18 living in them. Of all households, 40.6% were married-couple households, 18.5% were households with a male householder and no spouse or partner present, and 30.1% were households with a female householder and no spouse or partner present. About 22.5% of all households were made up of individuals and 7.5% had someone living alone who was 65 years of age or older.

There were 439 housing units, of which 9.1% were vacant. The homeowner vacancy rate was 1.7% and the rental vacancy rate was 7.6%.

Racial composition as of the 2020 census
Race	Number	Percent
White	640	59.6%
Black or African American	243	22.6%
American Indian and Alaska Native	9	0.8%
Asian	15	1.4%
Native Hawaiian and Other Pacific Islander	0	0.0%
Some other race	44	4.1%
Two or more races	122	11.4%
Hispanic or Latino (of any race)	135	12.6%

=== 2000 census ===
As of the census of 2000, there were 648 people, 246 households, and 168 families residing in the town. The population density was 769.1 inhabitants per square mile (297.0/km^{2}). There were 275 housing units at an average density of 326.4 units per square mile (126.0 units/km^{2}). The racial makeup of the town was 70.22% White, 26.85% African American, 0.15% Native American, 0.31% Asian, 0.15% Pacific Islander, 0.15% from other races, and 2.16% from two or more races. Hispanic or Latino of any race were 3.24% of the population.

There were 246 households, out of which 32.9% had children under the age of 18 living with them, 43.9% were married couples living together, 17.5% had a female householder with no husband present, and 31.7% were non-families. 26.0% of all households were made up of individuals, and 13.4% had someone living alone who was 65 years of age or older. The average household size was 2.63 and the average family size was 3.17.

In the town, the population was spread out, with 29.5% under the age of 18, 6.9% from 18 to 24, 32.1% from 25 to 44, 18.2% from 45 to 64, and 13.3% who were 65 years of age or older. The median age was 35 years. For every 100 females, there were 87.8 males. For every 100 females age 18 and over, there were 89.6 males.

The median income for a household in the town was $30,781, and the median income for a family was $41,389. Males had a median income of $24,688 versus $22,222 for females. The per capita income for the town was $14,118. About 12.0% of families and 16.4% of the population were below the poverty line, including 28.2% of those under age 18 and 12.6% of those age 65 or over.

== Education ==
Most of Frederica lies within the Lake Forest School District, though some of is within the Milford School District. The zoned high school for Lake Forest areas is Lake Forest High School.

On April 7, 1897, the Delaware General Assembly created Frederica School District 32. That district merged into the Lake Forest district on July 1, 1969.

== Government ==
Frederica has a council-manager form of government, consisting of a Town Council. As of the March 2019 election, the Town Council consisted of Mayor William "Chick" Glanden, Treasurer/Secretary Ricky Maddox, Virginia Simpler, Jesus "Poncho" Davila, and John "Jack" Webb. Other branches of the town government include a Planning & Zoning Board, Board of Appeals, and Board of Adjustments.

Police services in Frederica is provided by the Frederica Police Department, which consists of two police officers. Fire protection to Frederica is provided by the Frederica Volunteer Fire Company-Station 49.

== Infrastructure ==
=== Transportation ===
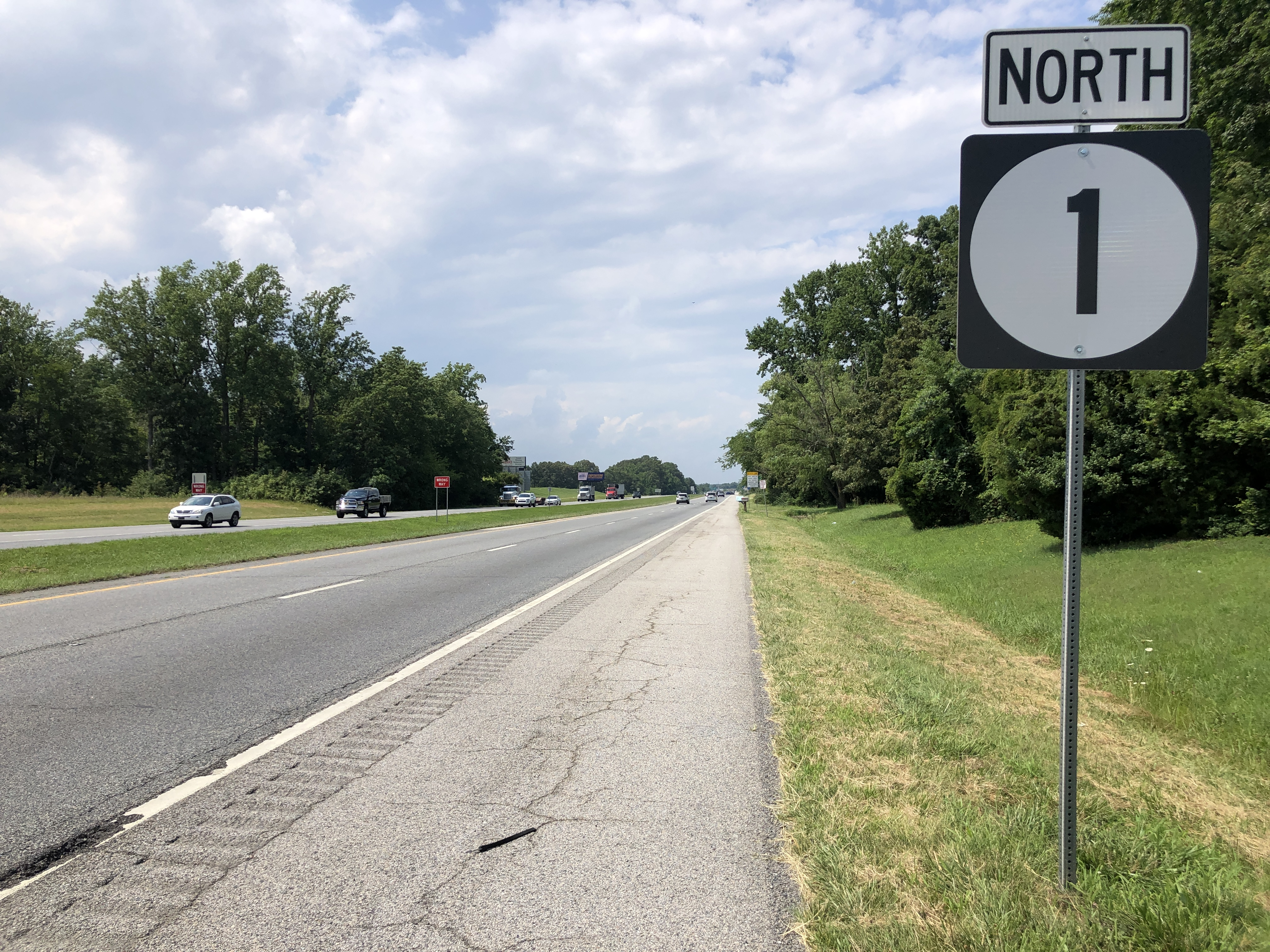
DE 1 northbound in Frederica

Delaware Route 1 passes to the east of Frederica, with Frederica Road running north–south through the town to provide access to DE 1 at the South Frederica interchange (exit 83) and the North Frederica interchange (exit 86). DE 1 leads north toward Dover and Wilmington and south toward Milford and the Delaware Beaches. Delaware Route 12 begins at DE 1 at the North Frederica interchange and passes through the town along Frederica Road, the one-way pair of David Street eastbound and Front Street westbound, and Front Street; DE 12 continues west toward Felton. Carpenter Bridge Road begins at DE 12 on the western edge of Frederica and leads southwest toward Harrington. DART First State provides bus service to Frederica along Route 303, which runs north to Dover and south to Milford and Georgetown. The South Frederica Park and Ride, a park and ride lot at the South Frederica interchange, is served by the Route 307, which runs north to Dover and south to Lewes.

=== Utilities ===
Delmarva Power, a subsidiary of Exelon, provides electricity to Frederica. Chesapeake Utilities provides natural gas to the town. The Town of Frederica Water Department/Public Works provides water service to the town. Trash and recycling collection in Frederica is provided by Charlie's Waste Services.

== See also ==
- ILC Dover
