= National Register of Historic Places listings in Kent County, Delaware =

Location of Kent County in Delaware

Kent County, Delaware, United States, has a number of properties and districts listed on the National Register of Historic Places.

This National Park Service list is complete through NPS recent listings posted October 16, 2026.

Contents: Counties and municipalities in Delaware
Newark (New Castle) | Wilmington (New Castle) | Northern New Castle | Southern New Castle | Kent | Sussex

== Current listings ==
	Name on the Register	Image	Date listed	Location	City or town	Description
1	Allee House	Allee House	March 24, 1971 (#71000220)	Off Delaware Route 9 on Dutch Neck Rd. 39°17′05″N 75°30′32″W	Dutch Neck Crossroads	
2	Archeological Site K-875 (7K-D-37/C)		May 22, 1979 (#79003223)	Address restricted	Kitts Hummock	
3	Archeological Site K-873 (7K-D-35/A, B and D)		May 22, 1979 (#79003228)	Address restricted	Magnolia	
4	Archeological Site K-876 (7K-D-38/C)		May 22, 1979 (#79003222)	Address restricted	Kitts Hummock	
5	Archeological Site K-880 (7K-D-42/F)		May 22, 1979 (#79003225)	Address restricted	Magnolia	
6	Archeological Site K-891 (7K-D-45/A and B)		May 22, 1979 (#79003226)	Address restricted	Magnolia	
7	Archeological Site K-913 (7K-D-47/C, D and E)		May 22, 1979 (#79003229)	Address restricted	Kitts Hummock	
8	Archeological Site K-914 (7K-D-48/F and G)		May 22, 1979 (#79003221)	Address restricted	Kitts Hummock	
9	Archeological Site K-915 (7K-D-86/C)		May 22, 1979 (#79003224)	Address restricted	Kitts Hummock	
10	Archeological Site K-916 (7K-D-49/C)		May 22, 1979 (#79003230)	Address restricted	Kitts Hummock	
11	Archeological Site K-920 (7K-D-52/A and C)		May 22, 1979 (#79003227)	Address restricted	Kitts Hummock	
12	Archeological Site No. 7K F 4 and 23		June 3, 1982 (#82002320)	Address restricted	Milford	
13	George Arnold House		June 27, 1983 (#83001360)	7 Hickories Road; 39°13′22″N 75°39′19″W	Kenton vicinity	Demolished in 2001
14	Aspendale	Aspendale	April 15, 1970 (#70000170)	1 mile west of Kenton on Delaware Route 300; 39°13′18″N 75°41′09″W	Kenton vicinity	
15	Thomas Attix House	Thomas Attix House	June 27, 1983 (#83001361)	Road 140; 39°13′31″N 75°42′28″W	Kenton vicinity	
16	Bank House	Bank House	July 31, 1978 (#78000890)	119 N. Walnut St. 38°54′55″N 75°25′43″W	Milford	
17	Bannister Hall and Baynard House	Bannister Hall and Baynard House	April 11, 1973 (#73000503)	South of Smyrna off Delaware Route 300; 39°17′22″N 75°37′19″W	Smyrna	
18	Barratt Hall	Barratt Hall	April 13, 1973 (#73000492)	South of Frederica off Road 372; 39°01′29″N 75°26′24″W	Frederica vicinity	
19	Barratt's Chapel	Barratt's Chapel	October 10, 1972 (#72000281)	North of Frederica on Delaware Route 1; 39°01′29″N 75°27′34″W	Frederica vicinity	
20	Belmont Hall	Belmont Hall	December 16, 1971 (#71000223)	217 Smyrna-Leipsic Rd. 39°17′40″N 75°35′45″W	Smyrna	
21	Bethel Methodist Protestant Church	Bethel Methodist Protestant Church	September 14, 1998 (#98001093)	Junction of Roads 61, 114, and 304; 38°51′49″N 75°38′13″W	Andrewville	
22	J. F. Betz House	J. F. Betz House	August 29, 1983 (#83001362)	Delaware Route 6; 39°17′02″N 75°40′29″W	Kenton vicinity	
23	Benjamin Blackiston House	Benjamin Blackiston House	June 27, 1983 (#83001363)	Off Delaware Route 6; 39°15′07″N 75°44′13″W	Kenton vicinity	
24	Bonwell House	Bonwell House	March 20, 1973 (#73000493)	4 miles west of Frederica on Road 380; 39°01′23″N 75°30′34″W	Frederica vicinity	
25	Bradford-Loockerman House	Bradford-Loockerman House	November 30, 1972 (#72000277)	419 S. State St. 39°09′19″N 75°31′24″W	Dover	
26	Brecknock	Brecknock	December 24, 1974 (#74000596)	0.5 miles north of Camden off U.S. Route 13; 39°07′26″N 75°32′10″W	Camden	
27	Building 1301, Dover Air Force Base	Building 1301, Dover Air Force Base	December 7, 1994 (#94001377)	Dover AFB, E. Dover Hundred; 39°07′07″N 75°27′24″W	Dover	
28	John Bullen House	John Bullen House	April 14, 1975 (#75000542)	214 S. State St. 39°14′27″N 75°31′28″W	Dover	
29	W. D. Burrows House	W. D. Burrows House	June 27, 1983 (#83001364)	Delaware Route 42; 39°14′10″N 75°40′30″W	Kenton vicinity	
30	Byfield Historic District		May 22, 1979 (#79003232)	Address restricted	Kitts Hummock	
31	Byrd's AME Church	Byrd's AME Church	October 19, 1982 (#82001023)	Smyrna Ave. 39°17′32″N 75°37′38″W	Clayton	
32	Camden Friends Meetinghouse	Camden Friends Meetinghouse	April 3, 1973 (#73000485)	Commerce St. 39°06′52″N 75°32′54″W	Camden	
33	Camden Historic District	Camden Historic District	September 17, 1974 (#74000595)	Both sides of Camden-Wyoming Ave. and Main St. 39°06′49″N 75°32′34″W	Camden	
34	Carey Farm Site		October 20, 1977 (#77000384)	Address restricted	Dover	
35	Cherbourg Round Barn	Cherbourg Round Barn	December 22, 1978 (#78000888)	Southwest of Little Creek off Delaware Route 9; 39°09′04″N 75°27′27″W	Little Creek	
36	Scene of Cheyney Clow's Rebellion	Scene of Cheyney Clow's Rebellion	January 14, 1974 (#74000598)	West of Kenton on Delaware Route 300; 39°12′15″N 75°44′35″W	Kenton vicinity	
37	Christ Church (Milford)	Christ Church (Milford)	May 8, 1973 (#73000502)	3rd and Church Sts. 38°54′56″N 75°25′55″W	Milford	
38	Christ Church (Dover)	Christ Church (Dover)	December 4, 1972 (#72001500)	S. State and Water Sts. 39°09′16″N 75°31′20″W	Dover	
39	Clark-Pratt House	Clark-Pratt House	June 27, 1983 (#83001365)	118 Main Street; 39°13′36″N 75°39′56″W	Kenton	
40	Clayton Railroad Station	Clayton Railroad Station	November 6, 1986 (#86003066)	Bassett St. 39°17′28″N 75°38′00″W	Clayton	
41	Coombe Historic District	Coombe Historic District	April 8, 1982 (#82002313)	West of Felton on Delaware Route 12 and Road 281; 39°00′09″N 75°37′10″W	Felton	
42	Cooper House	Cooper House	March 20, 1973 (#73000495)	33 Main Street; 39°13′40″N 75°39′48″W	Kenton	
43	Thomas B. Coursey House	Thomas B. Coursey House	July 23, 1990 (#90001069)	5578 Canterbury Road; 38°59′27″N 75°30′42″W	Felton	
44	Cow Marsh Old School Baptist Church	Cow Marsh Old School Baptist Church	June 24, 1976 (#76000571)	Northeast of Sandtown on Delaware Route 10; 39°02′31″N 75°41′42″W	Sandtown	
45	David J. Cummins House	David J. Cummins House	October 6, 1983 (#83003504)	587 Smyrna-Leipsic Rd. 39°17′37″N 75°35′16″W	Smyrna (Duck Creek Hundred)	
46	Timothy Cummins House	Timothy Cummins House	October 6, 1983 (#83003505)	3411 Smyrna-Lepsic Rd. 39°16′45″N 75°32′25″W	Smyrna (Duck Creek Hundred)	
47	Thomas Davis House	Thomas Davis House	February 28, 1983 (#83001366)	Delaware Route 6; 39°17′15″N 75°39′26″W	Kenton	
48	Delaware Boundary Markers	Delaware Boundary Markers	February 18, 1975 (#75002101)	State line separating Delaware from Maryland and Pennsylvania	Multiple	Extends into bordering counties in eastern Maryland and southeastern Pennsylvania.
49	Delaware State Museum Buildings	Delaware State Museum Buildings	February 1, 1972 (#72000278)	316 S. Governors Ave. 39°09′22″N 75°31′39″W	Dover	
50	T.H. Denny House	T.H. Denny House	June 27, 1983 (#83001367)	2466 7 Hickories Road; 39°12′46″N 75°37′22″W	Kenton	
51	John Dickinson House	John Dickinson House	October 15, 1966 (#66000258)	5 miles southeast of Dover and 3 miles east of U.S. Route 13 on Kitts Hummock Rd. 39°06′09″N 75°26′55″W	Dover	
52	Dill Farm Site		October 2, 1978 (#78000893)	Address restricted	Sandtown	
53	Dover Green Historic District	Dover Green Historic District	May 5, 1977 (#77000383)	Bounded by Governors Ave., North, South, and East Sts. 39°09′17″N 75°31′26″W	Dover	
54	N. C. Downs House	N. C. Downs House	June 27, 1983 (#83001368)	Road 141; 39°14′04″N 75°42′03″W	Kenton	
55	Downtown Harrington Historic District	Downtown Harrington Historic District	June 20, 2019 (#100004082)	Various; 38°55′25″N 75°34′42″W	Harrington	
56	Duck Creek Village	Duck Creek Village	February 1, 1972 (#72000282)	Road 65 between Duck Creek and Green's Branch; 39°18′28″N 75°37′15″W	Smyrna	
57	Durham-Shores House		September 21, 2001 (#01001005)	Eastern side of Delaware Route 15; 39°11′46″N 75°33′49″W	Dupont Station	
58	Eden Hill	Eden Hill	May 8, 1973 (#73000487)	Western end of Water St. 39°09′05″N 75°32′13″W	Dover	
59	Felton Historic District	Felton Historic District	January 26, 1988 (#87002433)	Roughly bounded by North, Walnut, Main, and Niles Sts. 39°00′27″N 75°34′56″W	Felton	Consists of buildings completed between 1856 and 1940, encompassing much of downtown.
60	Felton Railroad Station	Felton Railroad Station	July 13, 1981 (#81000191)	E. Railroad Ave. 39°00′39″N 75°34′33″W	Felton	
61	Fennimore Store	Fennimore Store	May 24, 1982 (#82002314)	Main, Lombard, and Front Sts. 39°14′27″N 75°30′51″W	Leipsic	
62	Fourteen Foot Bank Light	Fourteen Foot Bank Light	March 27, 1989 (#89000286)	On Fourteen Foot Bank in Delaware Bay, 12 miles east of Bowers; 39°02′54″N 75°10′57″W	Delaware Bay (Bowers)	
63	Frederica Historic District	Frederica Historic District	November 9, 1977 (#77000385)	Market, Front, and David Sts. 39°00′27″N 75°28′03″W	Frederica	
64	Vincelette Futuro House		December 26, 2023 (#100009680)	4388 Deep Grass Lane; 38°55′13″N 75°30′55″W	Houston	
65	George Farmhouse	George Farmhouse	October 19, 1982 (#82001862)	2615 Woodland Beach Rd. 39°18′41″N 75°32′57″W	Smyrna (Duck Creek Hundred)	
66	Golden Mine	Golden Mine	August 24, 1978 (#78000891)	West of Milford on Road 443; 38°54′19″N 75°29′08″W	Milford	
67	Governor's House	Governor's House	December 5, 1972 (#72000279)	Kings Hwy. 39°09′41″N 75°31′25″W	Dover	
68	Great Geneva	Great Geneva	March 26, 1973 (#73000489)	3 miles south of Dover on Road 356; 39°07′03″N 75°30′32″W	Camden	
69	Green Mansion House	Green Mansion House	June 27, 1983 (#83001369)	Main St. 39°13′37″N 75°40′37″W	Kenton	
70	Greenwold	Greenwold	March 20, 1973 (#73000488)	625 S. State St. 39°09′06″N 75°31′19″W	Dover	Demolished 2023
71	Griffith's Chapel	Griffith's Chapel	October 29, 1983 (#83001370)	Junction of Roads 442 and 443; 38°53′45″N 75°30′30″W	Williamsville	
72	Robert Hill House		August 29, 1983 (#83001371)	Delaware Route 6; 39°16′33″N 75°41′21″W	Kenton	Demolished between 2009 and 2011.
73	Hoffecker-Lockwood House	Hoffecker-Lockwood House	June 27, 1983 (#83001372)	Delaware Route 6; 39°13′36″N 75°35′53″W	Kenton	Demolished between 1983 and 1992.
74	Alfred L. Hudson House	Alfred L. Hudson House	June 27, 1983 (#83001373)	Road 90; 39°16′10″N 75°37′24″W	Kenton	
75	Hughes Early Man Sites		July 24, 1979 (#79000623)	Address restricted	Felton	
76	Hughes-Willis Site		November 21, 1978 (#78000887)	Address restricted	Dover	
77	Island Field Site		February 1, 1972 (#72000283)	South of the mouth of the Murderkill River, near Delaware Bay; 39°02′34″N 75°23′17″W	South Bowers	Includes the site of a village occupied during the ninth century AD
78	Ivy Dale Farm	Ivy Dale Farm	April 24, 1973 (#73000504)	1101 Smyrna-Leipsic Rd. 39°17′13″N 75°34′46″W	Smyrna (Duck Creek Hundred)	
79	Enoch Jones House	Enoch Jones House	June 19, 1973 (#73000486)	Southwest of Clayton off Delaware Route 300; 39°16′45″N 75°39′37″W	Clayton vicinity	
80	KATHERINE M. LEE (Schooner)		April 25, 1983 (#83001375)	Fox's Dock at Front and Lombard Sts. 39°14′31″N 75°30′51″W	Leipsic	
81	Kenton Historic District	Kenton Historic District	August 29, 1983 (#83001396)	Commerce St. 39°13′36″N 75°39′13″W	Kenton	
82	Kenton Post Office	Kenton Post Office	June 27, 1983 (#83001376)	64 Main Street; 39°13′38″N 75°39′54″W	Kenton	
83	Thomas Lamb Farm		August 29, 1983 (#83001374)	Road 130; 39°17′35″N 75°41′04″W	Kenton	
84	Thomas Lamb House	Thomas Lamb House	August 29, 1983 (#83001385)	Roads 129 and 130; 39°16′53″N 75°42′26″W	Kenton	House and milk house demolished; barn remains.
85	Alexander Laws House	Alexander Laws House	April 25, 1983 (#83001377)	Front and Walnut Sts. 39°14′27″N 75°31′00″W	Leipsic	
86	Lewis Family Tenant Agricultural Complex	Lewis Family Tenant Agricultural Complex	August 13, 1986 (#86001506)	Road 227; 39°06′15″N 75°36′30″W	Wyoming	
87	Jefferson Lewis House	Jefferson Lewis House	June 27, 1983 (#83001349)	2191 Seeneytown Road; 39°12′48″N 75°37′58″W	Kenton vicinity	
88	John B. Lindale House	John B. Lindale House	May 8, 1973 (#73002231)	24 Walnut St. 39°04′12″N 75°29′11″W	Magnolia	
89	Little Creek Hundred Rural Historic District	Little Creek Hundred Rural Historic District	November 7, 1984 (#84000286)	Delaware Route 9; 39°10′47″N 75°28′31″W	Little Creek	
90	Little Creek Methodist Church	Little Creek Methodist Church	May 24, 1982 (#82002316)	Main St. 39°09′49″N 75°26′49″W	Little Creek	
91	Peter Lofland House	Peter Lofland House	April 22, 1982 (#82002321)	417 N. Walnut St. 38°55′03″N 75°25′43″W	Milford	
92	Logan School House K-834		May 22, 1979 (#79003231)	Road 68; 39°06′01″N 75°25′49″W	Kitts Hummock	
93	Loockerman Hall	Loockerman Hall	June 21, 1971 (#71000218)	Delaware State University campus 39°11′06″N 75°32′44″W	Dover	
94	Matthew Lowber House	Matthew Lowber House	April 16, 1971 (#71000221)	East of Main St. 39°04′21″N 75°28′50″W	Magnolia	
95	Lower St. Jones Neck Historic District	Lower St. Jones Neck Historic District	May 22, 1979 (#79003233)	Address restricted	Kitts Hummock	
96	Macomb Farm	Macomb Farm	December 2, 1974 (#74000597)	Long Point Rd. off Delaware Route 8; 39°10′58″N 75°28′38″W	Dover	
97	MAGGIE S. MYERS (schooner)		April 25, 1983 (#83001378)	Killen's Dock at Front and Lombard Sts. 39°14′30″N 75°30′53″W	Leipsic	
98	McClary House	McClary House	April 25, 1983 (#83001353)	Main and McClary Sts. 39°14′23″N 75°30′49″W	Leipsic	
99	James McColley House	James McColley House	January 7, 1983 (#83001354)	500-502 NW. Front St. 38°54′46″N 75°26′07″W	Milford	
100	Delaplane McDaniel House		June 27, 1983 (#83001379)	Road 92; 39°13′36″N 75°35′53″W	Kenton	
101	Mifflin-Marim Agricultural Complex	Mifflin-Marim Agricultural Complex	November 7, 1984 (#84000269)	Delaware Route 9; 39°12′40″N 75°30′06″W	Dover	
102	Mount Pleasant	Mount Pleasant	September 11, 1992 (#92001134)	5 Margie Dr. 39°16′38″N 75°36′27″W	Smyrna	
103	Milford New Century Club	Milford New Century Club	April 22, 1982 (#82002322)	6 S. Church Ave. 38°54′44″N 75°25′53″W	Milford	
104	Mill House	Mill House	January 7, 1983 (#83001380)	414 NW. Front St. 38°54′47″N 75°26′05″W	Milford	
105	Moore House	Moore House	October 19, 1982 (#82001022)	511 W. Mt. Vernon St. 39°17′45″N 75°36′51″W	Smyrna	
106	Mordington	Mordington	April 13, 1973 (#73000494)	South of Frederica on Canterbury Rd. 38°58′07″N 75°29′39″W	Frederica vicinity	
107	North Milford Historic District	North Milford Historic District	January 7, 1983 (#83001357)	Roughly bounded by Mispillion River, Silver Lake, N. Walnut and NW. 3rd Sts. 38°54′53″N 75°25′52″W	Milford	
108	Octagonal Schoolhouse	Octagonal Schoolhouse	March 24, 1971 (#71000217)	East of Cowgill; 39°11′44″N 75°28′21″W	Cowgill's Corner	
109	Old Fire House	Old Fire House	January 7, 1983 (#83001381)	Church Ave. 38°54′52″N 75°25′50″W	Milford	
110	Old Statehouse	Old Statehouse	February 24, 1971 (#71000219)	The Green; 39°09′23″N 75°31′23″W	Dover	
111	Old Stone Tavern	Old Stone Tavern	July 2, 1973 (#73000499)	Main St. 39°09′51″N 75°26′51″W	Little Creek	
112	Palmer Home	Palmer Home	September 13, 1988 (#88001443)	115 American Ave. 39°09′50″N 75°31′31″W	Dover	
113	Peterson and Mustard's Hermitage Farm	Peterson and Mustard's Hermitage Farm	October 26, 1982 (#82001027)	1653 Big Oak Rd. 39°17′29″N 75°34′10″W	Smyrna	
114	Poinsett House	Poinsett House	June 27, 1983 (#83001350)	Delaware Route 6; 39°15′46″N 75°44′34″W	Kenton	
115	Port Mahon Lighthouse	Port Mahon Lighthouse	October 25, 1979 (#79000624)	Northeast of Little Creek; 39°11′05″N 75°24′04″W	Little Creek	
116	Rawley House	Rawley House	April 25, 1983 (#83001352)	Main St. 39°14′26″N 75°30′51″W	Leipsic	
117	Raymond Neck Historic District	Raymond Neck Historic District	November 8, 1982 (#82001026)	North of Leipsic between Leipsic River and Road 85; 39°14′53″N 75°30′32″W	Leipsic	
118	Reed House	Reed House	April 25, 1983 (#83001351)	Lombard St. 39°14′31″N 75°30′47″W	Leipsic	
119	Jehu Reed House	Jehu Reed House	June 4, 1973 (#73000500)	Delaware Route 1; 39°02′30″N 75°27′27″W	Little Heaven	
120	Ruth Mansion House	Ruth Mansion House	April 11, 1973 (#73000496)	Main St. 39°14′25″N 75°30′51″W	Leipsic	
121	St. Paul A.M.E. Church	St. Paul A.M.E. Church	October 17, 2016 (#16000726)	103 W. Mispillion St. 38°55′21″N 75°34′58″W	Harrington	
122	St. Joseph's Industrial School	St. Joseph's Industrial School	December 12, 2002 (#02001491)	355 W. Duck Creek Rd. 39°17′37″N 75°38′13″W	Clayton	
123	St. Stephen's P.E. Church	St. Stephen's P.E. Church	October 8, 2014 (#14000825)	110 Fleming St. 38°55′30″N 75°34′42″W	Harrington	
124	Savin-Wilson House	Savin-Wilson House	September 11, 1992 (#92001135)	551 Hurd Rd. 39°17′11″N 75°32′07″W	Smyrna (Duck Creek Hundred)	
125	Saxton United Methodist Church	Saxton United Methodist Church	July 23, 1990 (#90001070)	3419 Main Street; 39°03′30″N 75°24′14″W	Bowers	
126	Short's Landing Hotel Complex	Short's Landing Hotel Complex	October 17, 1983 (#83003506)	6180 Hay Point Landing Road; 39°20′49″N 75°32′12″W	Smyrna	
127	Sipple House	Sipple House	May 24, 1982 (#82002315)	Denny and Front Sts. 39°14′27″N 75°31′04″W	Leipsic	
128	Smyrna Historic District	Smyrna Historic District	May 23, 1980 (#80000930)	Delaware Route 6 and U.S. Route 13; 39°17′59″N 75°36′24″W	Smyrna	
129	Snowland	Snowland	March 20, 1973 (#73000497)	Delaware Route 42; 39°13′46″N 75°31′39″W	Leipsic	
130	Somerville	Somerville	December 31, 1974 (#74000599)	1073 7 Hickories Road; 39°13′18″N 75°38′45″W	Kenton	
131	Star Hill AME Church	Star Hill AME Church	November 25, 1994 (#94001389)	357 Voshells Mill Star Hill Road; 39°06′06″N 75°32′10″W	Camden vicinity	
132	William Stevens House		August 29, 1983 (#83001406)	Delaware Route 6; 39°16′33″N 75°40′30″W	Kenton	Demolished February 2001.
133	Elizabeth Stubbs House		May 24, 1982 (#82002317)	Main St. 39°09′48″N 75°26′51″W	Little Creek	
134	Thomas Sutton House	Thomas Sutton House	April 11, 1973 (#73000505)	Florio Road; 39°19′31″N 75°30′22″W	Woodland Beach	
135	Tharp House	Tharp House	March 20, 1973 (#73000491)	East of Farmington on U.S. Route 13; 38°52′17″N 75°34′35″W	Farmington	
136	Thomas' Methodist Episcopal Chapel	Thomas' Methodist Episcopal Chapel	January 26, 1994 (#93001516)	Road 206 west of Chapeltown, West Dover Hundred; 39°05′55″N 75°42′15″W	Chapeltown	
137	Parson Thorne Mansion	Parson Thorne Mansion	June 21, 1971 (#71000222)	501 NW. Front St. 38°54′49″N 75°26′07″W	Milford	
138	Todd's Chapel	Todd's Chapel	September 14, 1998 (#98001094)	Junction of Todd's Chapel Rd., and Hickman Rd. 38°50′07″N 75°40′25″W	Greenwood	
139	Town Point	Town Point	December 5, 1972 (#72000280)	Kitts Hummock Rd. 39°04′53″N 75°25′44″W	Dover	
140	Gov. George Truitt House	Gov. George Truitt House	December 12, 1978 (#78000889)	Southwest of Magnolia on Road 388; 39°01′10″N 75°32′18″W	Magnolia	
141	Tyn Head Court	Tyn Head Court	March 1, 1973 (#73000490)	East of Dover on S. Little Creek Rd. 39°09′15″N 75°28′36″W	Dover	
142	Victorian Dover Historic District	Victorian Dover Historic District	July 16, 1979 (#79000622)	Roughly bounded by Silver Lake, St. Jones River, North and Queen Sts. 39°09′51″N 75°31′35″W	Dover	
143	Vogl House	Vogl House	November 7, 1976 (#76000570)	West of Masten; 38°57′52″N 75°37′44″W	Masten's Corner	
144	John M. Voshell House	John M. Voshell House	October 6, 1983 (#83003507)	887 Hawkey Branch Rd. 39°18′05″N 75°31′06″W	Smyrna (Duck Creek Hundred)	
145	Walnut Farm	Walnut Farm	November 10, 1982 (#82001025)	Roosa Rd. 38°55′39″N 75°26′09″W	Milford	
146	Gov. William T. Watson Mansion	Gov. William T. Watson Mansion	April 22, 1982 (#82002323)	600 N. Walnut St. 38°55′12″N 75°25′47″W	Milford	
147	Wheel of Fortune	Wheel of Fortune	April 11, 1973 (#73000498)	South of Leipsic off Delaware Route 9; 39°12′53″N 75°30′46″W	Leipsic	
148	White-Warren Tenant House	White-Warren Tenant House	September 21, 2001 (#01001009)	Northeastern side of Road 261; 39°00′56″N 75°40′15″W	Sandtown	
149	J. H. Wilkerson & Son Brickworks	J. H. Wilkerson & Son Brickworks	July 12, 1978 (#78000892)	Off Road 409; 38°55′08″N 75°24′50″W	Milford	Listed as destroyed or demolished
150	James Williams House	James Williams House	June 27, 1983 (#83001382)	1064 7 Hickories Road; 39°13′12″N 75°38′48″W	Kenton	
151	Woodlawn	Woodlawn	October 19, 1982 (#82001863)	1165 DuPont Blvd. 39°17′15″N 75°35′39″W	Smyrna (Duck Creek Hundred)	Demolished July 14th, 2017
152	Jonathan Woodley House	Jonathan Woodley House	May 24, 1982 (#82002318)	Main St. 39°09′46″N 75°26′48″W	Little Creek	
153	Woodside Methodist Episcopal Church	Woodside Methodist Episcopal Church	February 16, 1996 (#96000107)	Main St., North Murderkill Hundred; 39°04′19″N 75°34′03″W	Woodside	
154	Wright-Carry House		June 27, 1983 (#83001383)	Commerce St. 39°13′35″N 75°39′56″W	Kenton	
155	Wyoming Historic District	Wyoming Historic District	February 18, 1987 (#86003037)	Roughly bounded by Front St., Caesar Rodney Ave., Southern Blvd., and Mechanic St. 39°07′11″N 75°33′29″W	Wyoming	
156	Wyoming Railroad Station	Wyoming Railroad Station	December 4, 1980 (#80000931)	1 N. Railroad Ave. 39°07′06″N 75°33′32″W	Wyoming	
157	Zion African Methodist Episcopal Church	Zion African Methodist Episcopal Church	November 25, 1994 (#94001388)	Center St. 39°07′01″N 75°33′05″W	Camden	

== Former listing ==
	Name on the Register	Image	Date listed	Date removed	Location	City or town	Description
1	Governor John Cook House		October 6, 1983 (#83003503)	June 5, 1986	S of Smyrna	Smyrna	Birthplace of former Delaware Governor John Cook. Removed after being relocated to the National Building Museum in Washington, DC.
