= St. Jones Neck =

Archaeological site in Delaware, United States

St. Jones Neck is a geographic region of eastern central Kent County, Delaware, United States, with a rich prehistory and colonial history. Originally known just as Jones Neck, it is bounded on the west by the St. Jones River, on the north by Little Creek (roughly, the southeast boundary of Dover Air Force Base), and on the east by Delaware Bay. The area consists of low rolling hills that do not rise very much above sea level, interspersed with bodies of fresh and salt water. Streams are headed by marshes, and there are tidal marshlands along the bay. The neck has pockets of woodland which are concentrated near the freshwater marshes and tributaries. Land use in the neck is at present predominantly agricultural.

== Prehistory ==
The St. Jones Neck area has seen human activity for about 8,000 years. The clearest evidence of early human use occurs in the Late Archaic Period (between 4000 and 2000 BCE), a period in which a surface-level archaeological survey identified sixteen sites associated with this time period. Five of these (K-873, K-891, K-913, K-914, and K-920) have been listed on the National Register of Historic Places, as have another five (K-875, K-876, K-880, K-915, and K-916) associated with later periods. Analysis suggests that these sites were only short-term encampments, but excavations may yield more information.

Activity in the area apparently subsided until the Middle Woodland Period (700 BCE – 1000 AD), a time in which the native population began producing ceramics. Three sites (K-913, K-915, and K-891) included finds of the earliest types of ceramics from this period. At one site (K-875), trade goods from as far off as present-day Ohio were found. Usage of the land continued to be seasonal and transitional in nature until the Late Woodland Period (after 1000 AD) in which evidence of longer-term stable seasonal bases of operations appeared. K-891, in particular, appears to have been a major seasonal base, affiliated with a more permanent village elsewhere. K-914 is the only prehistoric native site with evidence of European contact; it lies adjacent to one of the earliest European contact points in the region.

== History ==
The Kent County area did not come under significant colonial control until Delaware came under the control of James, the Duke of York. Under his administration, which began in the 1670s, land grants were made on St. Jones Neck. One of the notable land grants was to Daniel Jones, whose daughter married William Rodney, the grandfather of Delaware statesman Caesar Rodney. Only archaeological remnants are left of the Jones-Rodney Byfield estate. Although these tracts of land would have been cleared and farmed by the grantees and their descendants, over time they became tenant farms, as the comparatively wealthy landowners moved to live in more urban settings.

During the late 18th century, the lands of the neck along the St. Jones River were almost entirely bought up by Delaware and Pennsylvania statesman John Dickinson. Dickinson spent time at his father's house, built c. 1740, on the neck, and organized his extensive holdings (several thousand acres at its greatest extent) into a collection of tenant farms. Much of this land remained in the hands of Dickinson descendants well into the 20th century. In other portions of the neck the larger tracts were gradually broken down in the 19th century, but larger-scale agriculture in the 20th century again coalesced some of these parcels together.

== See also ==
- National Register of Historic Places listings in Kent County, Delaware
