= Reed House (Leipsic, Delaware) =

Historic house in Delaware, United States

- U.S. National Register of Historic Places
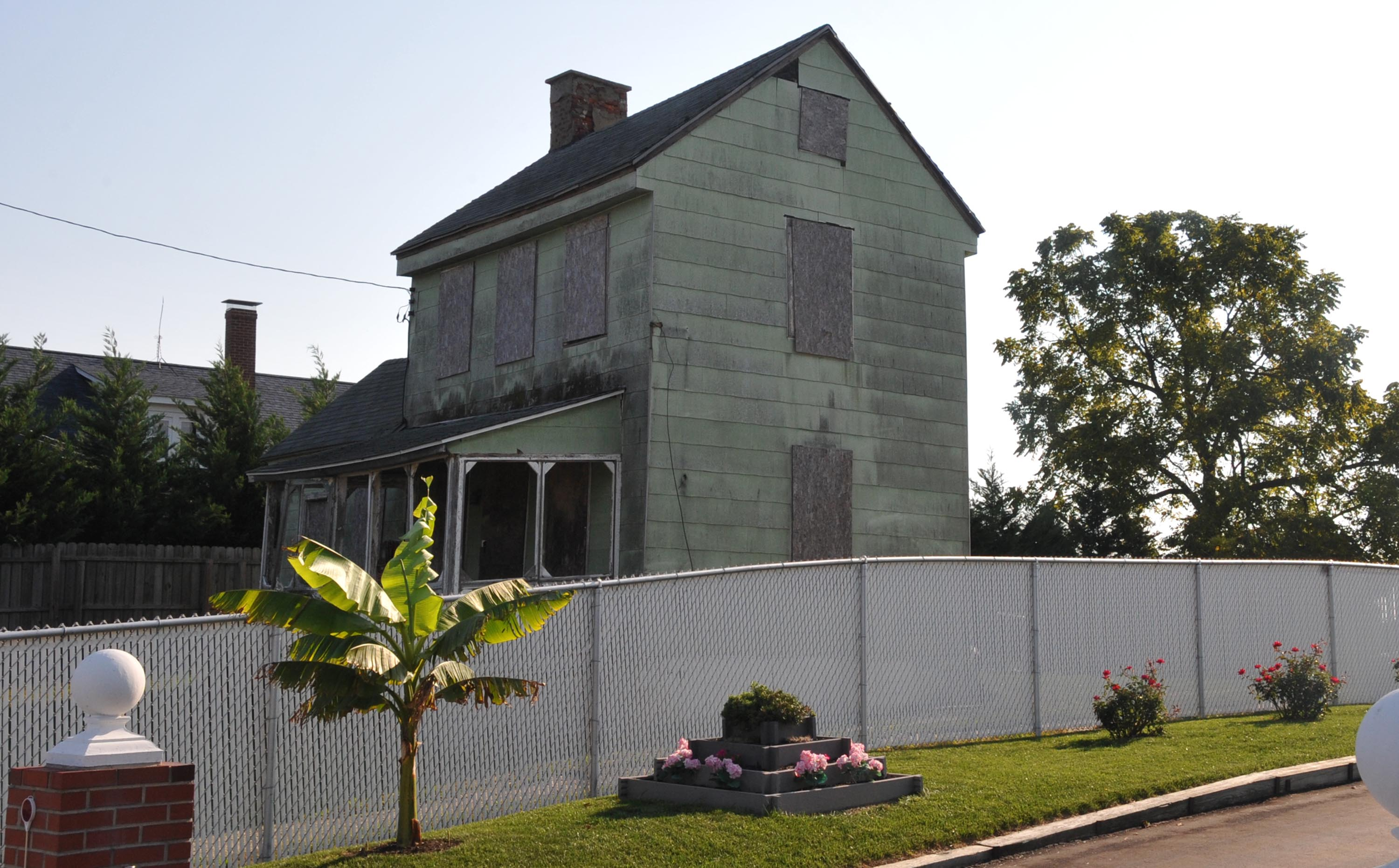
- Reed House, September 2012

- Location within Delaware Location within the United States
- Location: Lombard St., Leipsic, Delaware
- Coordinates: 39°14′31″N 75°30′47″W
- Area: 0.3 acres (0.12 ha)
- MPS: Leipsic and Little Creek MRA
- NRHP reference No.: 83001351
- Added to NRHP: April 25, 1983

Reed House is a historic home located at Leipsic, Kent County, Delaware. It dates to the first quarter of the 19th century, and is a two-story, three-bay, gable roofed timber-frame vernacular dwelling. It has a later one-story frame extending wing from the east gable end. The front facade features a plain tetra-style front porch with squared supports and a shed roof.

It was listed on the National Register of Historic Places in 1983.
