= St. Paul A.M.E. Church (Harrington, Delaware) =

Historic church in Delaware, United States

- U.S. National Register of Historic Places
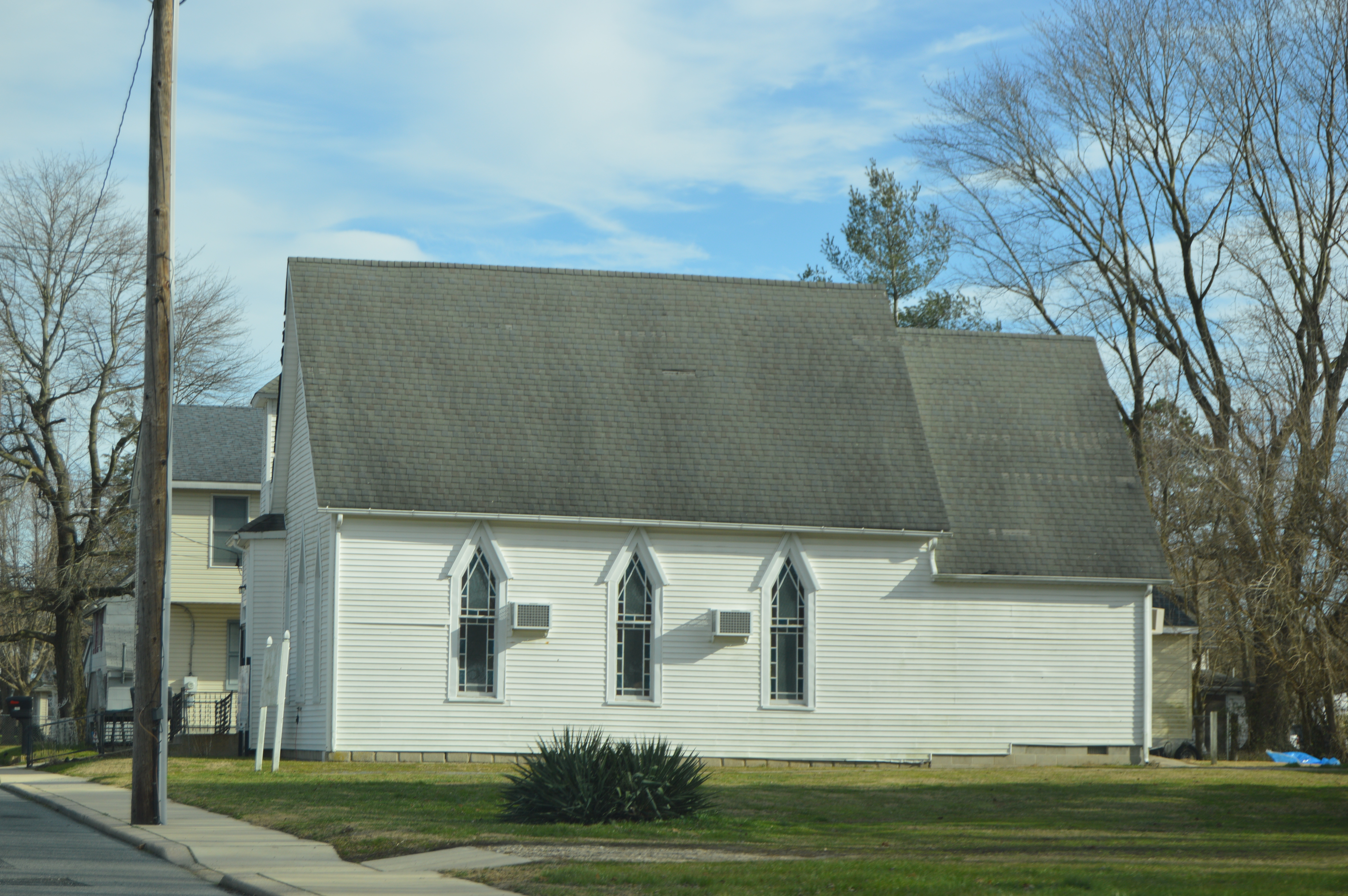

- Location within Delaware Location within the United States
- Location: 103 W. Mispillion St., Harrington, Delaware
- Coordinates: 38°55′21″N 75°34′58″W
- Area: less than one acre
- Built: 1895
- Architectural style: Gothic revival
- NRHP reference No.: 16000726
- Added to NRHP: October 17, 2016

The St. Paul African Methodist Episcopal Church is a historic African Methodist Episcopal (AME) church at 103 Mispillion Street in Harrington, Kent County, Delaware. It is a single-story wood-frame structure with vernacular Gothic Revival features. It has a steeply pitched gable roof, and narrow pointed-arch stained-glass windows with scissor-like muntins and mullions. It was built about 1895 for a predominantly African-American congregation founded in 1830.

The church was listed on the National Register of Historic Places in 2016.

== See also ==
- National Register of Historic Places listings in Kent County, Delaware
