= Carey Farm Site =

Archaeological site in Delaware, United States

- U.S. National Register of Historic Places
- Nearest city: Dover, Delaware
- Area: 8.9 acres (3.6 ha)
- NRHP reference No.: 77000384
- Added to NRHP: October 20, 1977

The Carey Farm Site (7K-D-3) is a prehistoric Native American archaeological site in central Kent County, Delaware, near Dover. The site, located along the St. Jones River, encompasses what is believed to be a major seasonal base camp from the Woodland Period. Ceramics dating back to 200 CE have been found at the site.

The site was listed on the National Register of Historic Places in 1977.

== See also ==
- National Register of Historic Places listings in Kent County, Delaware
