= Raymond Neck Historic District =

Historic district in Delaware, United States

- U.S. National Register of Historic Places
- U.S. Historic district
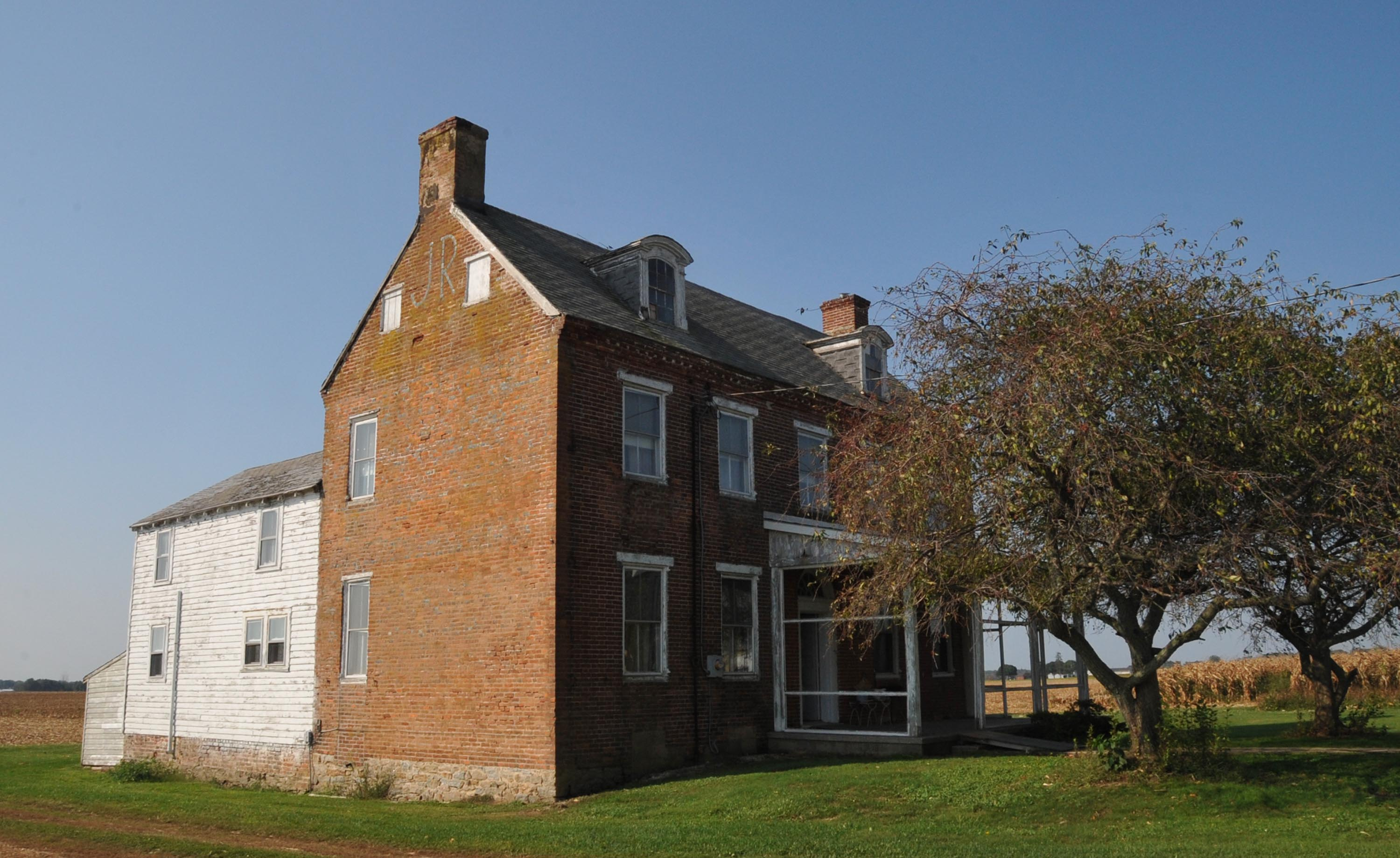
- John Raymond house, Raymond Neck Historic District, September 2012

- Location within Delaware Location within the United States
- Location: North of Leipsic between Leipsic River and Road 85, near Leipsic, Delaware
- Coordinates: 39°14′53″N 75°30′32″W
- Area: 432 acres (175 ha)
- Built: c. 1820-1830, 1867
- NRHP reference No.: 82001026
- Added to NRHP: November 8, 1982

Raymond Neck Historic District is a national historic district located near Leipsic, Kent County, Delaware. It encompasses eight contributing buildings and four contributing structures in a rural area near Leipsic. There are three two-story, center hall plan, brick dwellings dated between 1820 and 1867 and known as the John Raymond house (c. 1830), James Hoffecker house (c. 1820), and Robert Wilson's "Hebron" (1867). The other contributing buildings and structures are related outbuildings.

It was listed on the National Register of Historic Places in 1982.
