= McClary House =

Historic house in Delaware, United States

- U.S. National Register of Historic Places
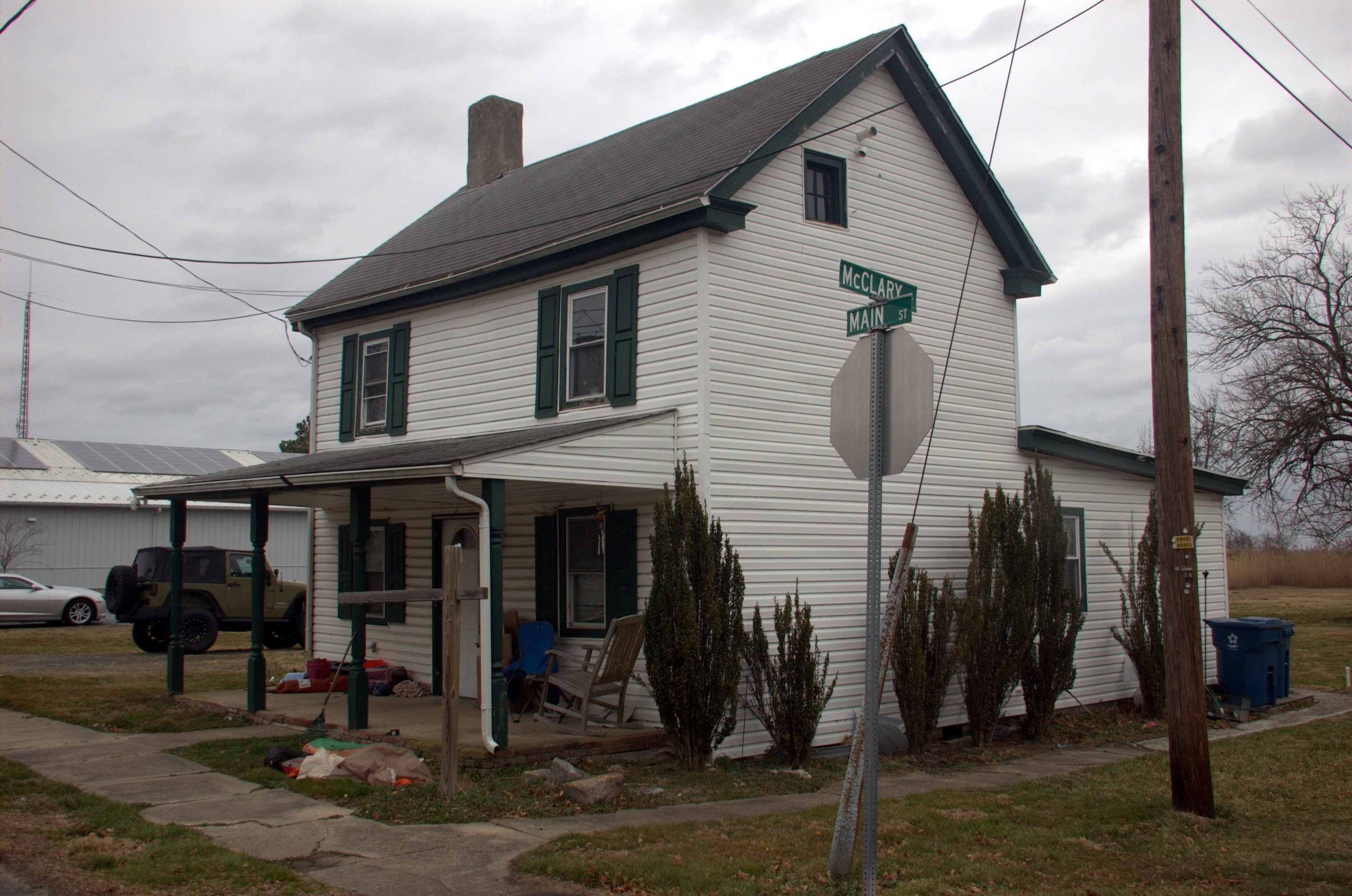

- Location within Delaware Location within the United States
- Location: Main and McClary Sts. Leipsic, Delaware
- Coordinates: 39°14′23″N 75°30′49″W
- Area: 0.1 acres (0.040 ha)
- MPS: Leipsic and Little Creek MRA
- NRHP reference No.: 83001353
- Added to NRHP: April 25, 1983

McClary House is a historic home located at Leipsic, Kent County, Delaware. It dates to the mid-19th century, and is a two-story, gable roofed timber-frame vernacular dwelling on a brick foundation. It was built as a hall-and-parlor plan house and retains an interior gable end chimney at either end of the structure.

It was listed on the National Register of Historic Places in 1983.
