= Rawley House =

Historic house in Delaware, United States

- U.S. National Register of Historic Places
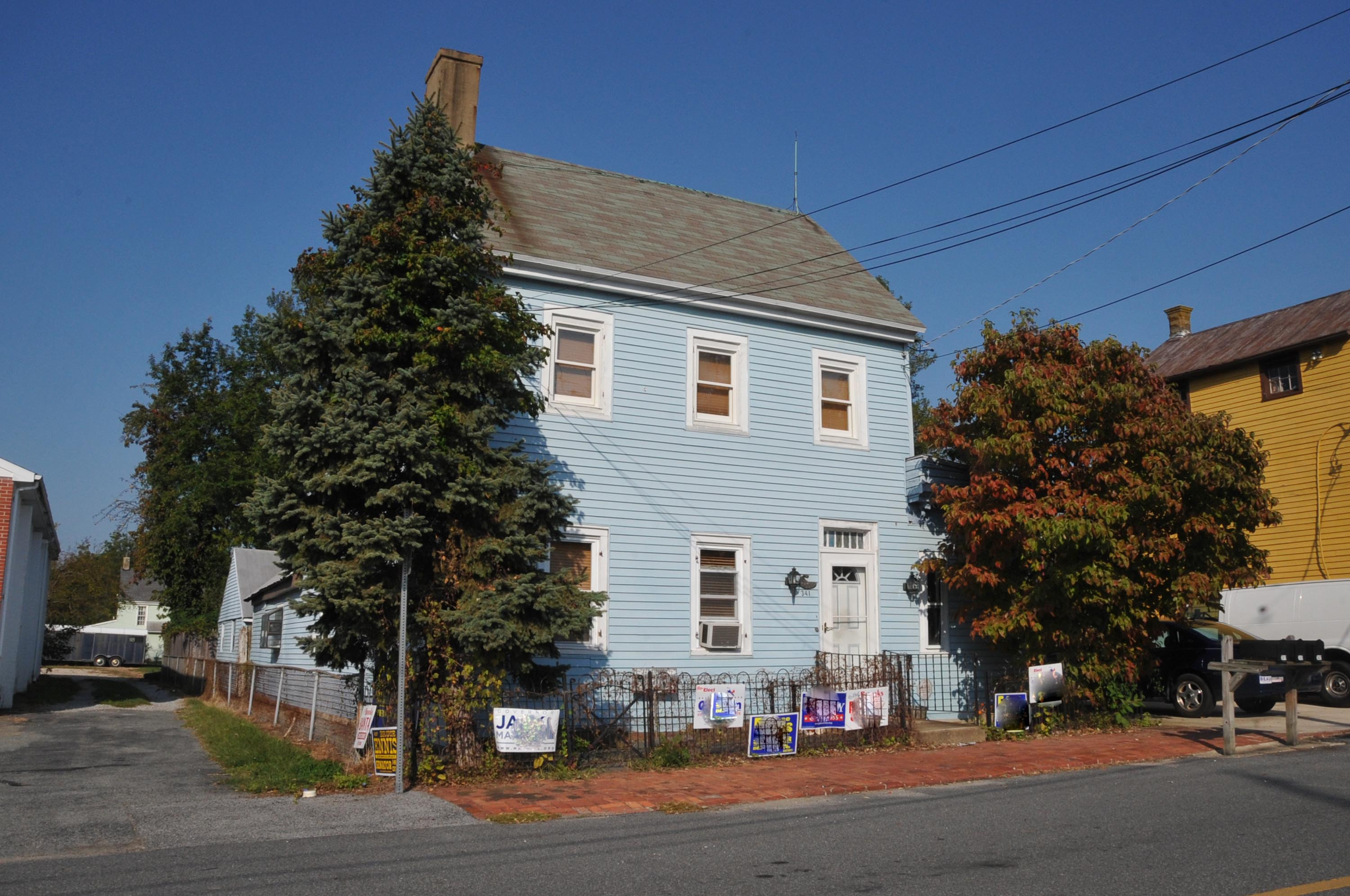
- Rawley House, September 2012

- Location within Delaware Location within the United States
- Location: Main St., Leipsic, Delaware
- Coordinates: 39°14′26″N 75°30′51″W
- Area: 4.2 acres (1.7 ha)
- MPS: Leipsic and Little Creek MRA
- NRHP reference No.: 83001352
- Added to NRHP: April 25, 1983

Rawley House is a historic home located at Leipsic, Kent County, Delaware. It dates to the mid-19th century, and is a two-story, three-bay, gable roofed frame vernacular dwelling. It was built as a side hall plan, single pile house and later transformed to a double pile dwelling with additions. Additions are a two-story lean-to, a one-story, one-room plan lean-to the north and a one-story frame ell to the rear.

It was listed on the National Register of Historic Places in 1983.
