= Logan School House K-834 =

- U.S. National Register of Historic Places
- Location within Delaware Location within the United States
- Location: Road 68, Kitts Hummock, Delaware
- Coordinates: 39°6′1″N 75°25′49″W
- Area: 0 acres (0 ha)
- Built: c. 1868
- MPS: St. Jones Neck MRA
- NRHP reference No.: 79003231
- Added to NRHP: May 22, 1979

Logan School House is a historic one-room school building located at Kitts Hummock, Kent County, Delaware. It was built about 1868, and is a one-story, gable roofed frame structure with grey simulated brick composition siding. The interior has a plastered barrel vault ceiling. The school served the educational requirements of the agricultural community of lower St. Jones Neck School District. Sometime after 1920 the building ceased to function as a school and it was converted into a private dwelling.

It was listed on the National Register of Historic Places in 1979.
