= Wheel of Fortune (house) =

Historic house in Delaware, US

- U.S. National Register of Historic Places
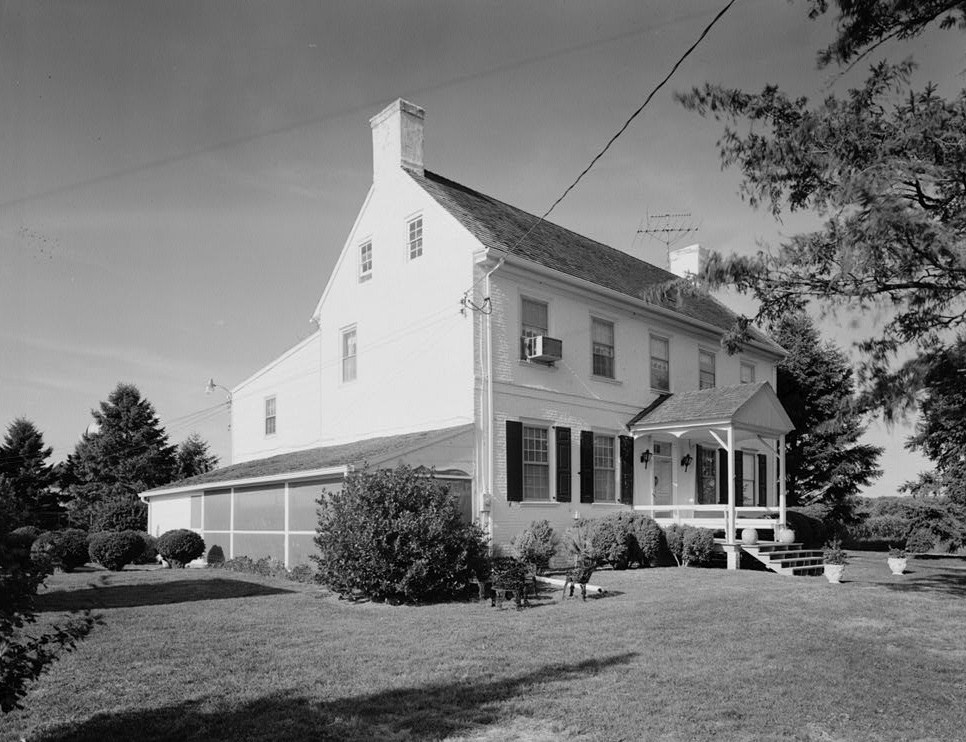
- Wheel of Fortune, HABS Photo, November 1982

- Location within Delaware Location within the United States
- Location: South of Leipsic off Delaware Route 9, near Leipsic, Delaware
- Coordinates: 39°12′53″N 75°30′46″W
- Area: 1 acre (0.40 ha)
- Architectural style: Georgian
- NRHP reference No.: 73000498
- Added to NRHP: April 11, 1973

Wheel of Fortune is a historic home located near Leipsic, Delaware, United States. It was built in the 18th century, and is a two-story, five-bay, one room deep whitewashed brick dwelling in the Georgian style. It has a gable roof and the front facade features a one-bay entrance portico. It has a two-story rear wing, that originally contained a kitchen and servants quarters. Also on the property are a contributing meat house and milk house. The property was owned by Congressman John A. Nicholson (1827-1906) before 1888, and later by U.S. Senator James H. Hughes (1867-1953), who purchased it in 1910.

The house's name comes from a piece of land by the same name located along Muddy Branch south of Leipsic. While local lore claims the land was named as a play on owner John Chance's name, it was known as Wheel of Fortune at least three years before Chance acquired the land in 1738.

It was listed on the National Register of Historic Places in 1973.
