= Hughes-Willis Site =

Archaeological site in Delaware, United States

- U.S. National Register of Historic Places
- Nearest city: Dover, Delaware
- Area: 8 acres (3.2 ha)
- NRHP reference No.: 78000887
- Added to NRHP: November 21, 1978

The Hughes-Willis Site is a prehistoric Native American archaeological site in Kent County, Delaware. It is located in Dover, Delaware on the banks of the Little River, and was identified in 1971. The site contains evidence of occupation dating back 5,000 years, with its most significant occupational period being the Middle Woodland Period. Finds at the site include projectile points, and tools for cutting and scraping made of stone. The evidence suggests the site was occupied seasonally, probably sometime in the period between late fall and mid-winter.

The site was listed on the National Register of Historic Places in 1978.

== See also ==
- National Register of Historic Places listings in Kent County, Delaware
