= Archeological Site No. 7K F 4 and 23 =

Archaeological site in Delaware, United States

- U.S. National Register of Historic Places
- Nearest city: Milford, Delaware
- Area: 33 acres (13 ha)
- NRHP reference No.: 82002320
- Added to NRHP: June 3, 1982

7K-F-4 and 7K-F-23 are a pair of archaeological sites in southern Kent County, Delaware, near the town of Milford. Both are Early Woodland Period Native American camp sites, at which ceramics have been found.

The sites were listed on the National Register of Historic Places in 1982.

== See also ==
- National Register of Historic Places listings in Kent County, Delaware
