= Ruth Mansion House =

Historic house in Delaware, United States

- U.S. National Register of Historic Places
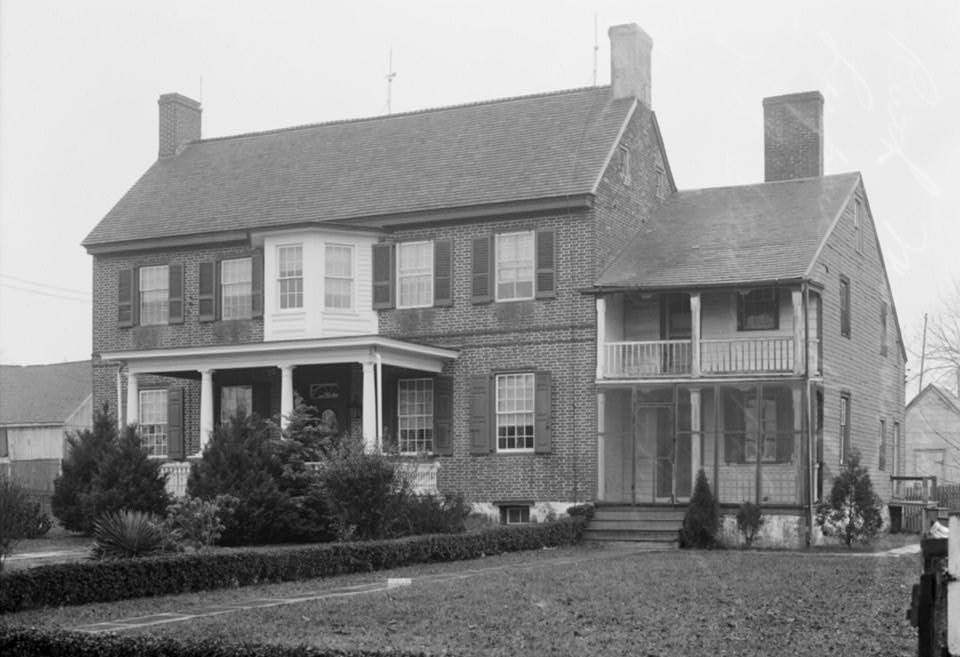
- Ruth Mansion House, HABS Photo, 1936

- Location within Delaware Location within the United States
- Location: Main St., Leipsic, Delaware
- Coordinates: 39°14′25″N 75°30′51″W
- Area: 1 acre (0.40 ha)
- Built: 1780
- Architectural style: Georgian
- MPS: Leipsic and Little Creek MRA
- NRHP reference No.: 73000496
- Added to NRHP: April 11, 1973

The William Ruth Mansion House is a historic house in Leipsic, Delaware. Originally built for William Ruth, a merchant and trustee of the first free school in Delaware, the house was listed in the National Register of Historic Places on April 11, 1973.

Ruth bought the property in 1807 and started his "Mansion House" soon thereafter. His house-builder used Owen Biddle's 1805 pattern book, The Young Carpenter's Assistant, for some of the designs, specifically the step end brackets of the main stair, which match the pattern book exactly (see photo). The house has been added to and renovated a number of times. The north section was added ca. 1841. The house contains 9 fireplaces, 6 in the original brick L-shaped section, including a large kitchen fireplace with original crane intact.

The main section had a second floor bay window added during the Victorian period, and the main section was renovated in the 1910s, adding a new newel post and main front door in the entrance hall, as well as sliding double doors into the main parlor, and French doors between the main parlor and the new dining room in a new frame addition to the rear, and a new front porch. The new front door and newel post are very similar to designs published in the Sears catalogues in the 1910s. An open porch behind the 1920s kitchen was enclosed in the 1950s. There are a number of shed additions to the rear of varying dates.

William Ruth was a merchant who bought local produce and shipped it to Philadelphia from the port of Leipsic, Delaware, then known as Fast Landing, which was renamed Leipsic in 1814. He died in 1822, willing the property in two halves, splitting the house in half.

== Gallery ==
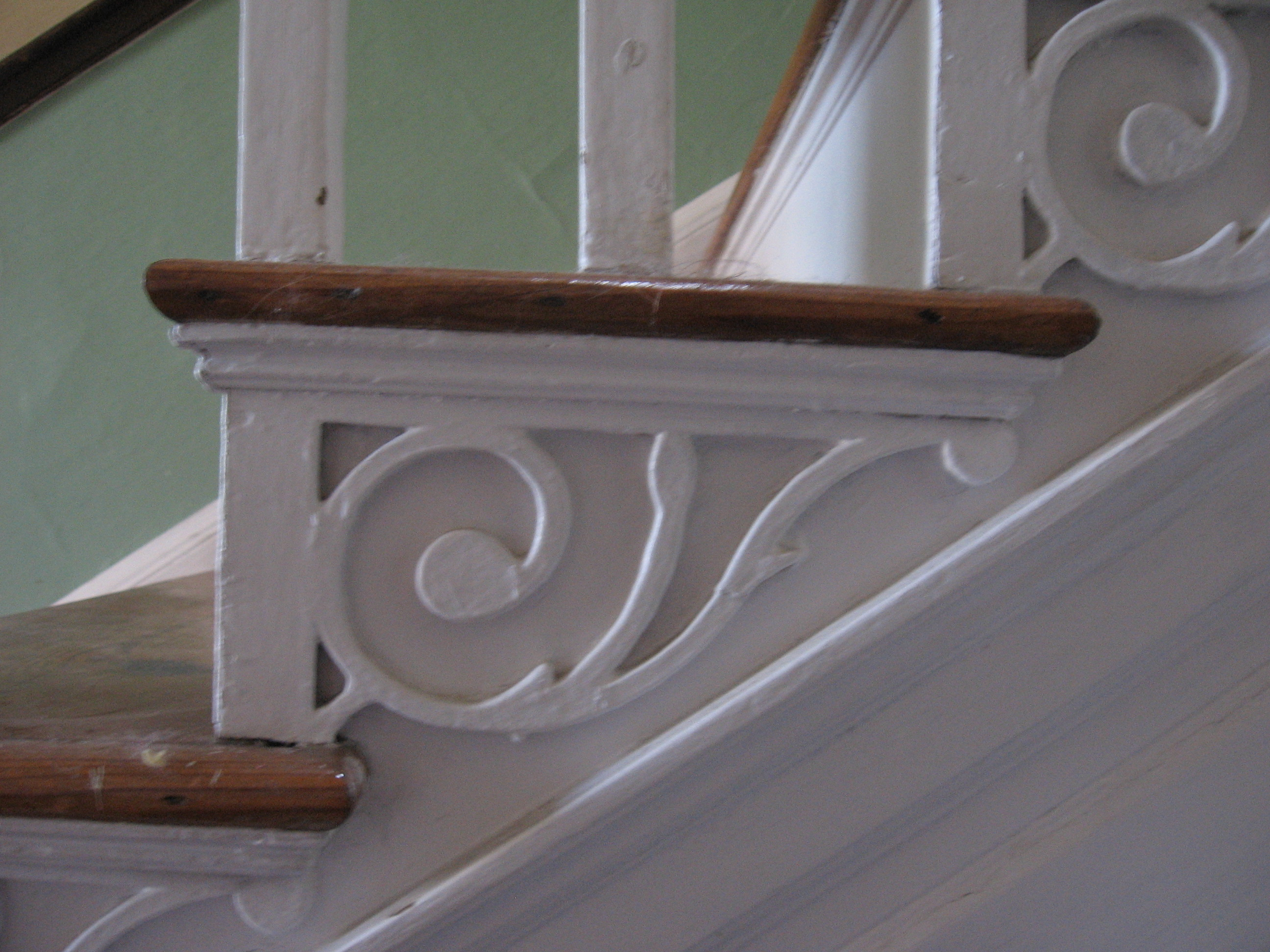
Stair bracket

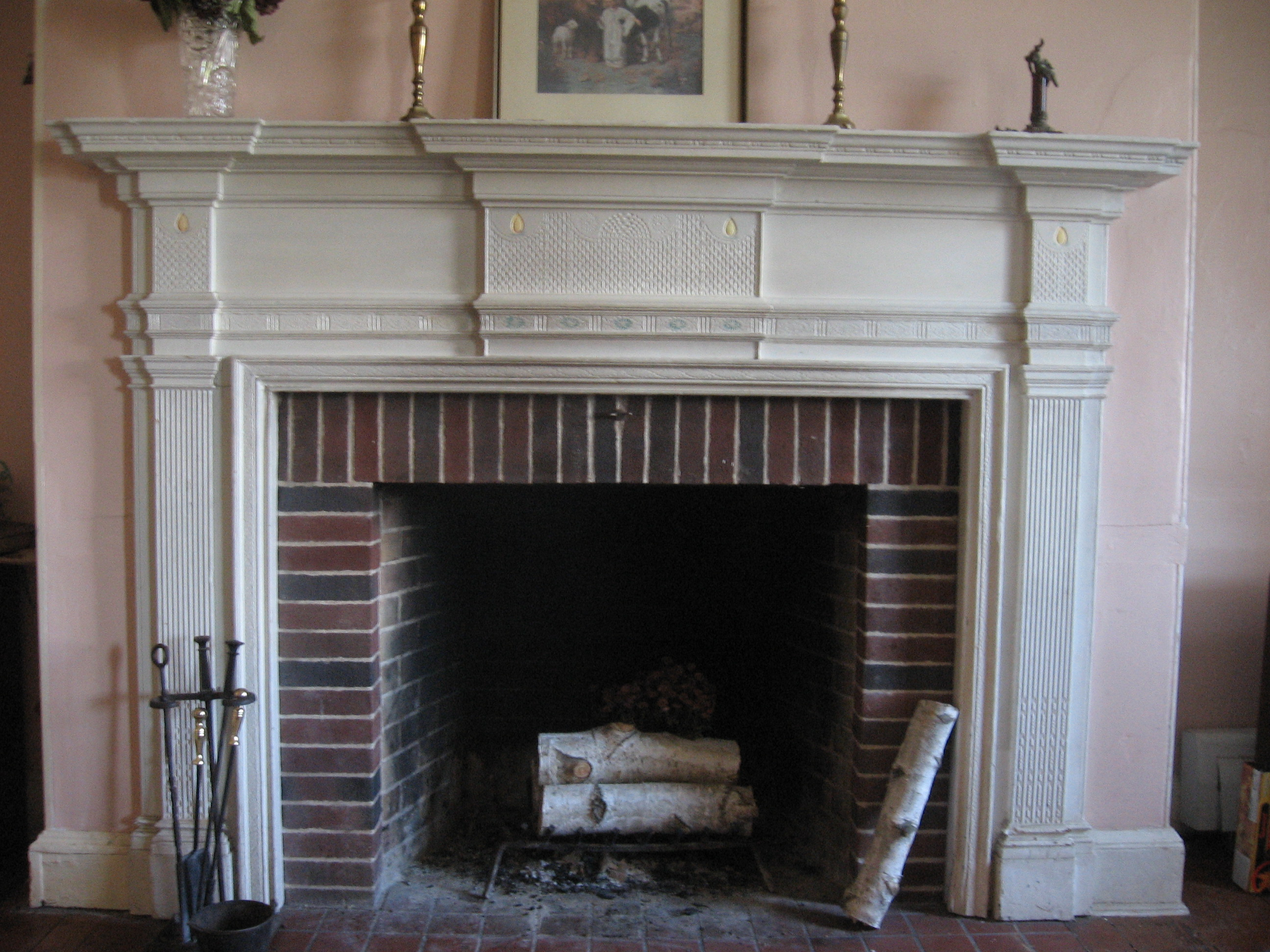
Mantel

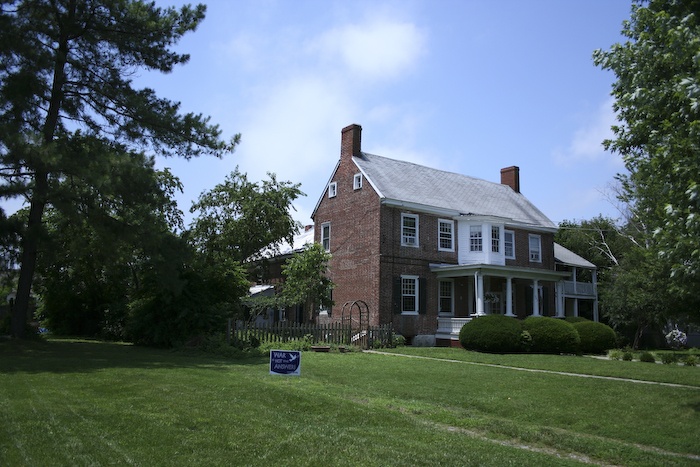
Exterior from southeast
