= Fennimore Store =

- U.S. National Register of Historic Places
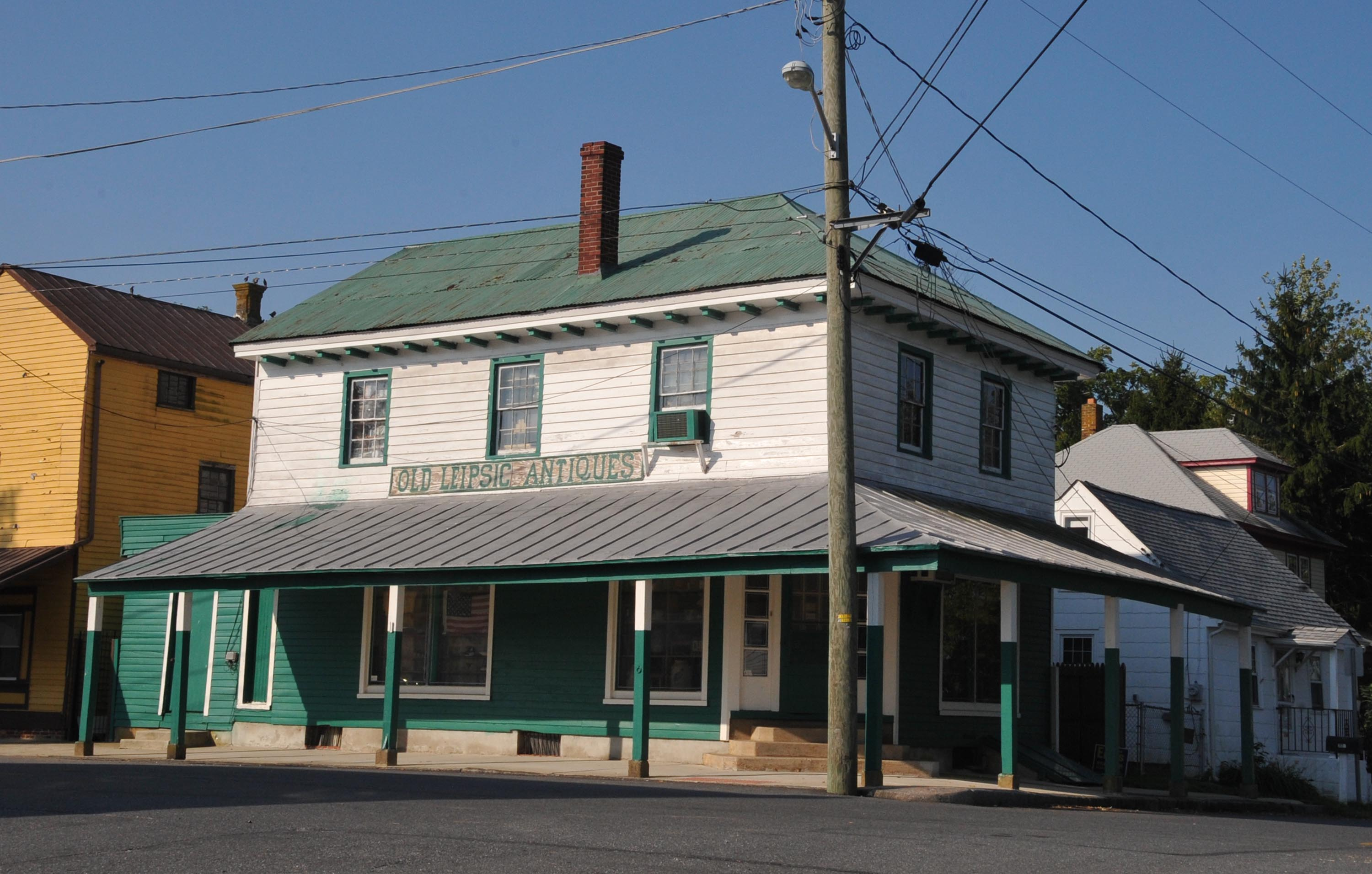
- Fennimore Store, September 2012

- Location within Delaware Location within the United States
- Location: Main, Lombard, and Front Sts., Leipsic, Delaware
- Coordinates: 39°14′27″N 75°30′51″W
- Area: 0.1 acres (0.040 ha)
- Built: 1840-1860
- MPS: Leipsic and Little Creek MRA
- NRHP reference No.: 82002314
- Added to NRHP: May 24, 1982

Fennimore Store is a historic commercial building located at Leipsic, Kent County, Delaware. It was built between 1840 and 1860, and is a two-story, hipped roofed frame structure clad in weatherboard siding. It features a full-width porch on two sides. It is representative of mid-19th-century commercial vernacular architecture. It has housed a general store, grocery and gas station, muskrat skinner's store and antique shop at various periods.

It was listed on the National Register of Historic Places in 1982.
