= Byfield Historic District =

Historic district in Delaware, United States

- U.S. National Register of Historic Places
- U.S. Historic district
- Nearest city: Kitts Hummock, Delaware
- Area: 692 acres (280 ha)
- Built: 1859
- MPS: St. Jones Neck MRA
- NRHP reference No.: 79003232
- Added to NRHP: May 22, 1979

Current farm that was the location of Byfield, an early colonial community in eastern Kent County

The Byfield Historic District encompasses the remains of an early colonial community in eastern Kent County, in the U.S. state of Delaware. The district includes four separate archaeological sites, each of which have been associated with early English settlers of the area. The site designated K-929 is the location of a brick kiln, which documentary evidence suggests was associated with Daniel Jones, the first settler in the area. K-917 is speculated to be associated with William Rodney, who married Jones' daughter. K-916 is a site that may have been a slave residence, and K-890 is believed to be the site of one of the homes of Caesar Rodney, Sr., the father of Delaware Revolutionary War leader and United States Founding Father Caesar Rodney. The only 19th-century structure in the district is the S. A. Sipple House.

The district was listed on the National Register of Historic Places in 1979.

== See also ==
- National Register of Historic Places listings in Kent County, Delaware
