= Alexander Laws House =

Historic house in Delaware, United States

- U.S. National Register of Historic Places
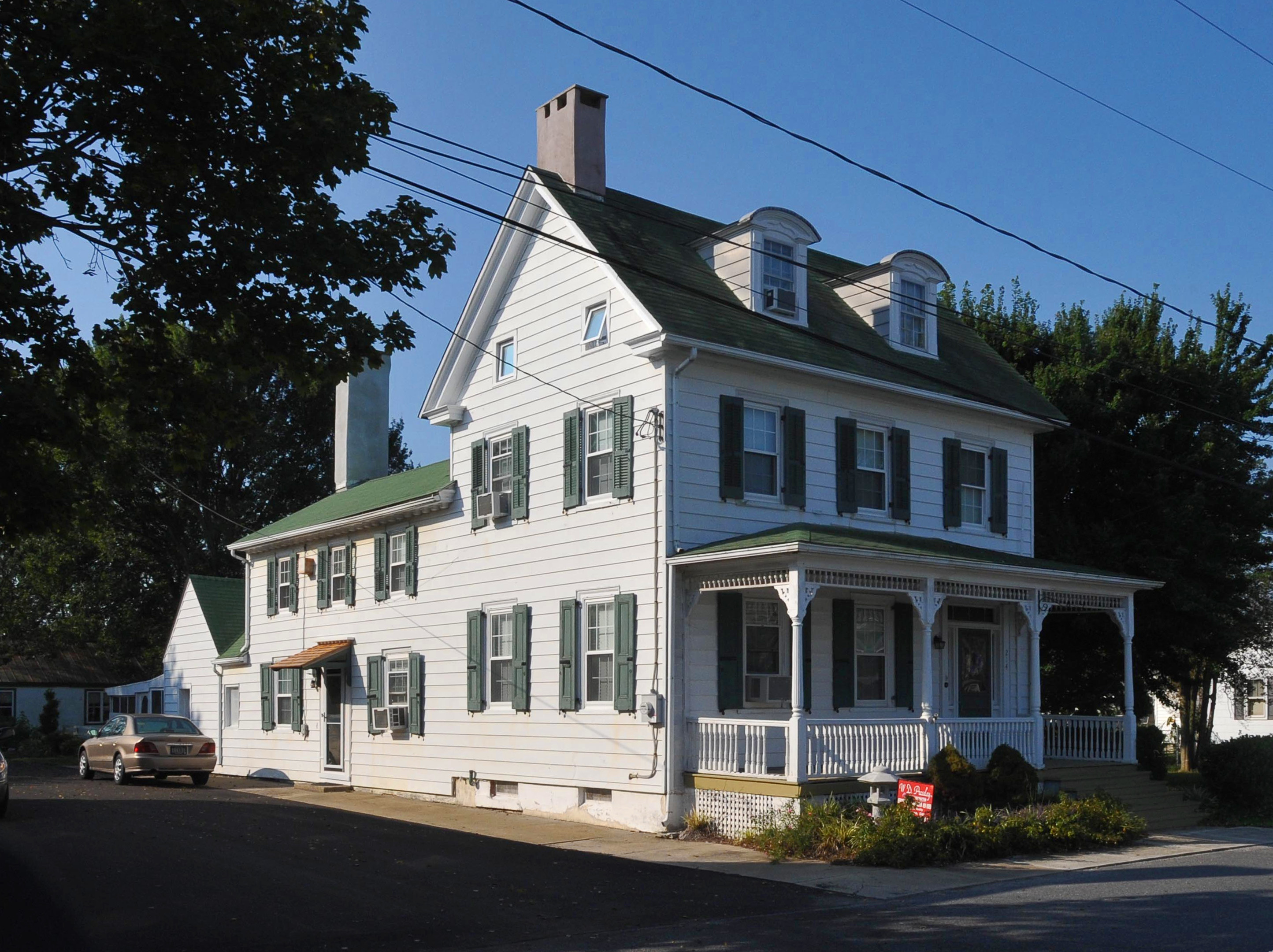
- Alexander Laws House, September 2012

- Location within Delaware Location within the United States
- Location: Front and Walnut Sts., Leipsic, Delaware
- Coordinates: 39°14′27″N 75°31′0″W
- Area: 0.8 acres (0.32 ha)
- MPS: Leipsic and Little Creek MRA
- NRHP reference No.: 83001377
- Added to NRHP: April 25, 1983

Alexander Laws House is a historic home located at Leipsic, Kent County, Delaware. It is a 2 1/2-story, gable roofed frame structure with rear wings. The earliest part of the house may be the one-story kitchen wing, with the main section of the house added between 1820 and 1830. It features a fine Eastlake porch, round-arched roof dormers, and handsome Greek Revival style entry.

It was listed on the National Register of Historic Places in 1983.
