= St. Stephen's Protestant Episcopal Church =

Historic church in Delaware, United States

- St. Stephen's P.E. Church
- U.S. National Register of Historic Places
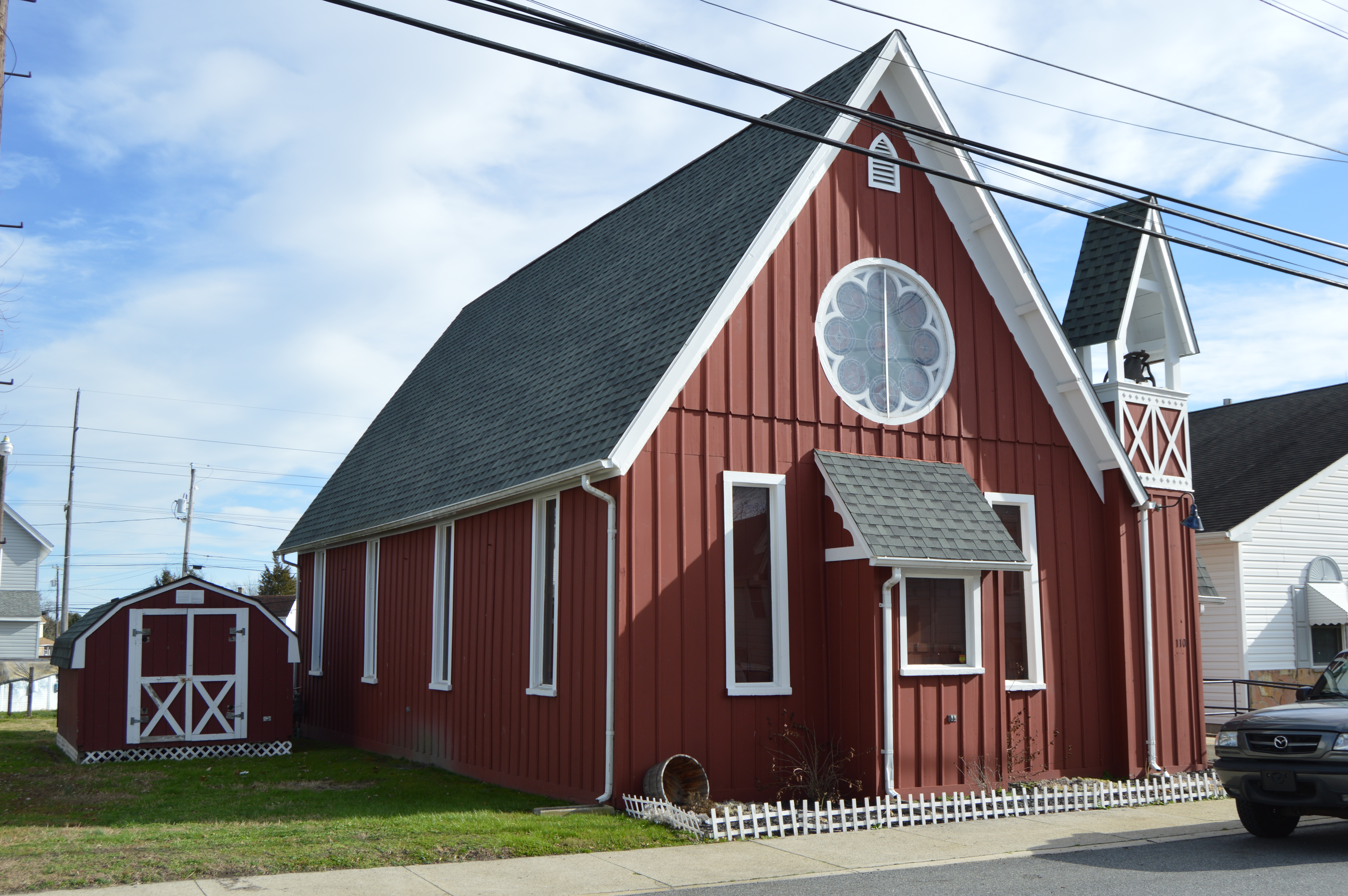
- Front and northern side

- Location within Delaware Location within the United States
- Location: 110 Fleming Street, Harrington, Delaware
- Coordinates: 38°55′30″N 75°34′42″W
- Built: 1876
- Architectural style: Carpenter Gothic
- NRHP reference No.: 14000825
- Added to NRHP: October 8, 2014

The St. Stephen's Protestant Episcopal Church is a historic church building at 110 Fleming Street in Harrington, Delaware. It is a single-story wood-frame structure, built in 1876 in the Carpenter Gothic style.

Original features from its construction include the stained glass window in the western facade, and the exterior board-and-batten siding. The building was built by the Rev. J. Leighton McKim as a mission church, and remained his personal property until his death in 1918, when it was transferred to the Episcopal Diocese of Delaware. It is now owned by the Harrington Historical Society, who operate it as a local history museum.

The building was listed on the National Register of Historic Places in 2014.

== See also ==
- National Register of Historic Places listings in Kent County, Delaware
