= Lower St. Jones Neck Historic District =

Historic district in Delaware, United States

- U.S. National Register of Historic Places
- U.S. Historic district
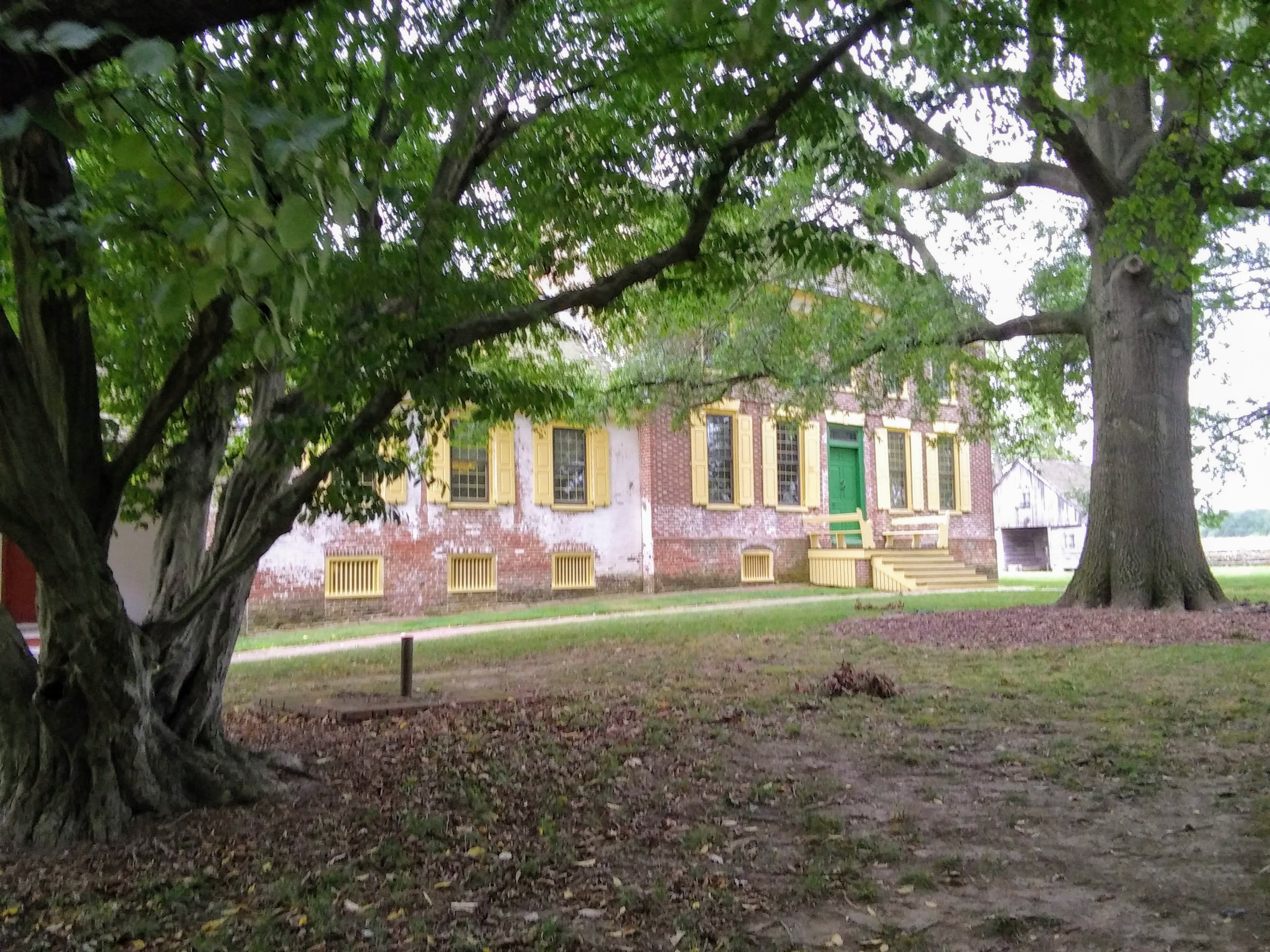
- Nearest city: Kitts Hummock, Delaware
- Area: 2,350 acres (950 ha)
- Built: 1750
- MPS: St. Jones Neck MRA
- NRHP reference No.: 79003233
- Added to NRHP: May 22, 1979

The Lower St. Jones Neck Historic District encompasses an expansive area of eastern Kent County, Delaware, east of Dover, Delaware. It is prominent in part for its association with the politically powerful Dickinson family, and in particular John Dickinson, the statesman of Pennsylvania and Delaware. Most of the land in the district was owned in the late 18th and early 19th centuries by Dickinson, who built a summer house at Logan Lane Farm early in the 19th century, and an overseer's house now called the Dickinson Mansion. The area has remained in the hands of Dickinson descendants into the 20th century.

The district was listed on the National Register of Historic Places in 1979.

== See also ==
- National Register of Historic Places listings in Kent County, Delaware
