= Sipple House =

Historic house in Delaware, US

- U.S. National Register of Historic Places
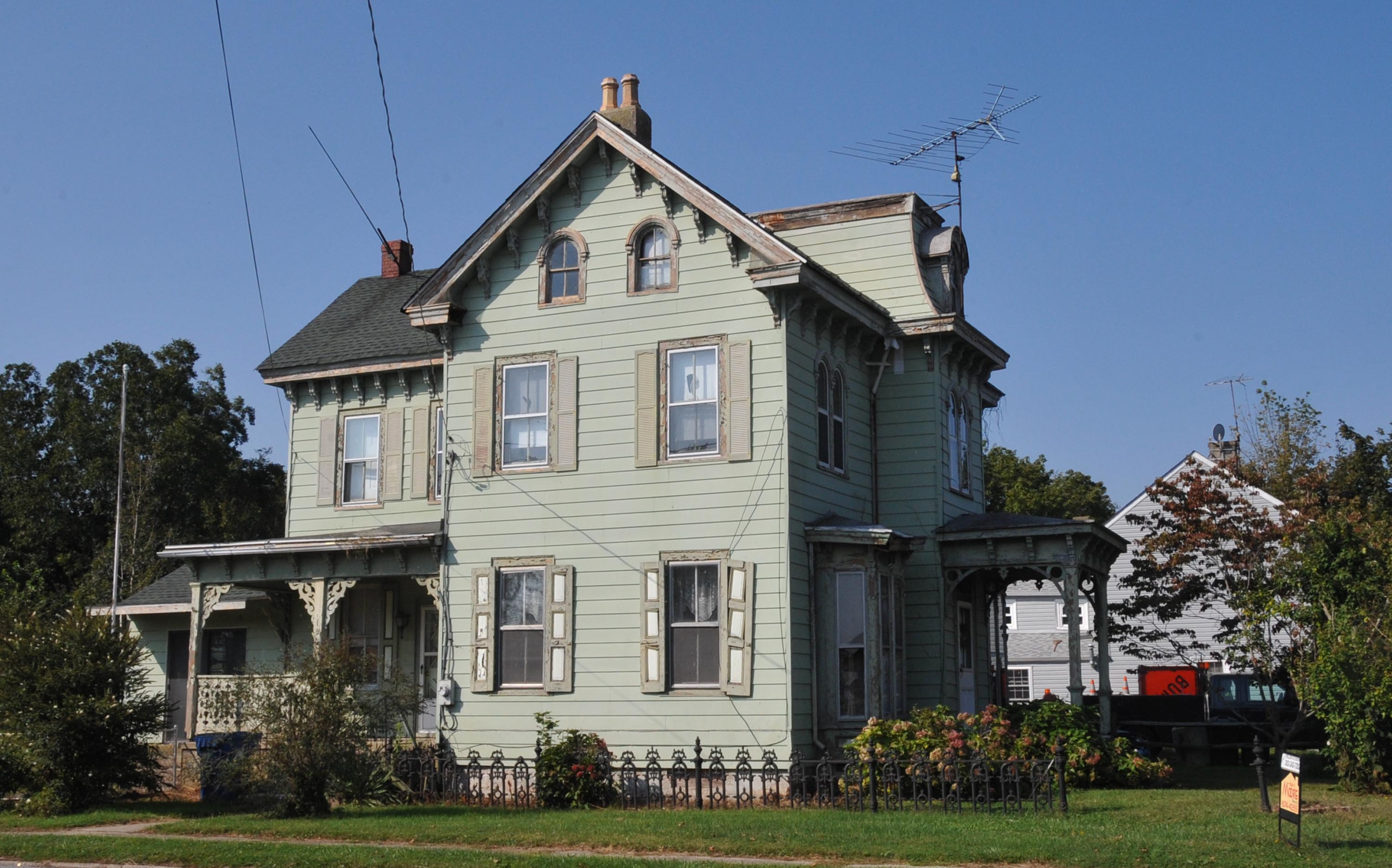
- Sipple House, September 2012

- Location within Delaware Location within the United States
- Location: Denny and Front Sts., Leipsic, Delaware
- Coordinates: 39°14′27″N 75°31′4″W
- Area: 0.2 acres (0.081 ha)
- Built: c. 1880-1890
- Architectural style: Late Victorian, Italianate
- MPS: Leipsic and Little Creek MRA
- NRHP reference No.: 82002315
- Added to NRHP: May 24, 1982

Sipple House is a historic home located at Leipsic, Kent County, Delaware. It was built about 1885, and is a two-story, cruciform plan frame single pile dwelling with a later rear ell. It has a gable roof with box cornice and Italianate style brackets and a projecting center bay topped by a mansard roof. It features a distyle front porch and tetrastyle east gable-end porch.

It was listed on the National Register of Historic Places in 1982.
