= Todd's Chapel =

Historic church in Delaware, United States

- U.S. National Register of Historic Places
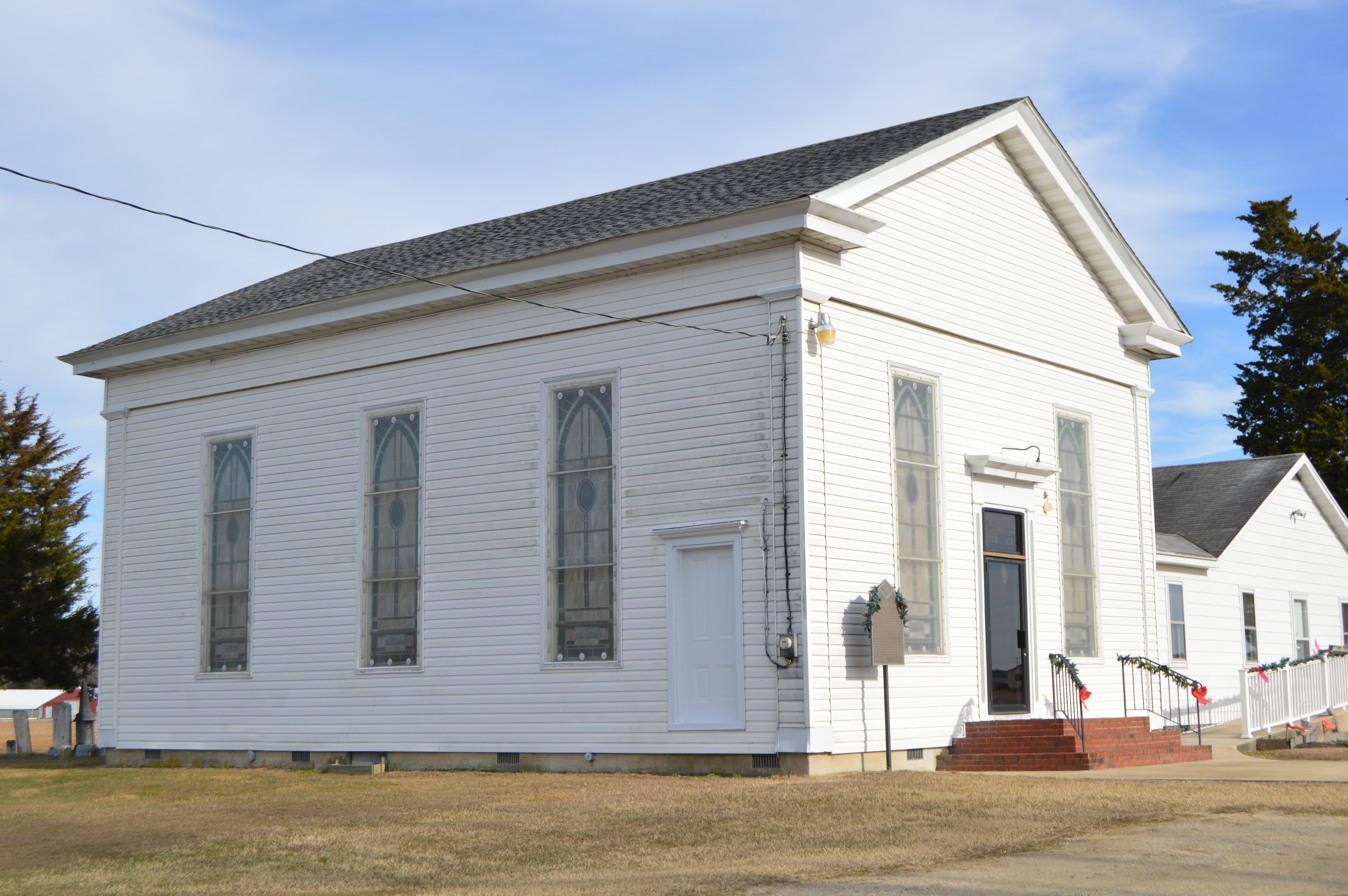
- Western side and front

- Location within Delaware Location within the United States
- Location: Jct. of Todd's Chapel Rd., and Hickman Rd., near Greenwood, Delaware
- Coordinates: 38°50′7″N 75°40′25″W
- Area: 6.2 acres (2.5 ha)
- Built: 1858
- Architectural style: vernacular Greek Revival
- NRHP reference No.: 98001094
- Added to NRHP: September 14, 1998

Todd's Chapel, also known as Todd's Methodist Episcopal Church and Todd's United Methodist Church, is a historic Methodist chapel at the junction of Todd's Chapel Road, and Hickman Road near Greenwood, Kent County, Delaware. It was built in 1858, and is a one-story, rectangular frame building in a vernacular Greek Revival style. It measures 32 feet, 9 inches, wide by 44 feet, 9 inches deep. It has a gable roof and features stained glass windows. The one story Church School Building wing was added to the church in 1966. Located east and north of the church are cemeteries dating to the third quarter of the 19th century, with the earliest marker dated 1861.

It was added to the National Register of Historic Places in 1998.
