= Camden Historic District =

Historic district in Delaware, United States

- U.S. National Register of Historic Places
- U.S. Historic district
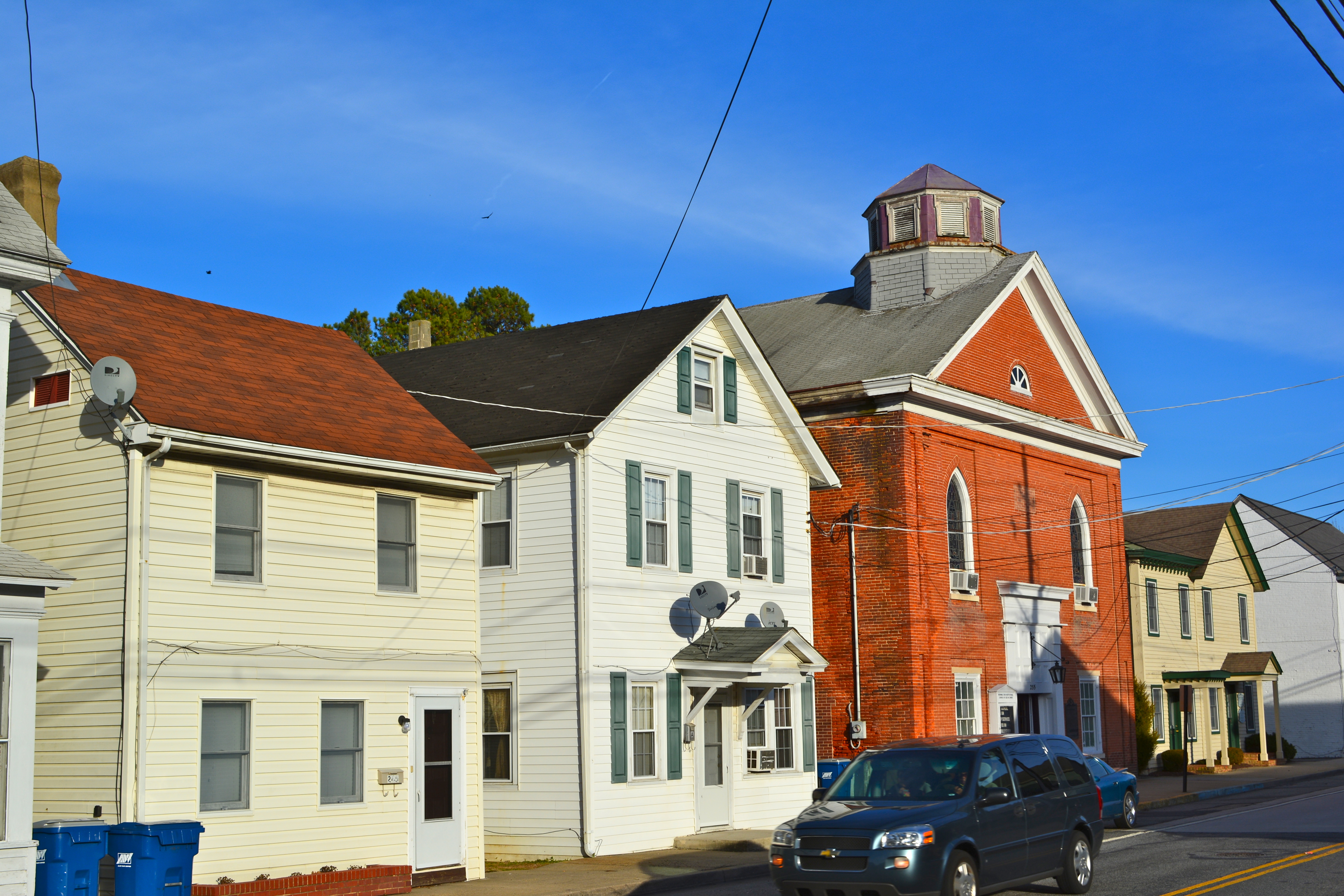
- Whatcoat Church on the right

- Location within Delaware Location within the United States
- Location: Both sides of Camden-Wyoming Ave. and Main St., Camden, Delaware
- Coordinates: 39°06′49″N 75°32′34″W
- Area: 31.6 acres (12.8 ha)
- Built: 1780
- Architectural style: Greek Revival, Italianate, Georgian
- NRHP reference No.: 74000595
- Added to NRHP: September 17, 1974

Camden Historic District is a national historic district located at Camden, Kent County, Delaware. It encompasses 65 contributing buildings in the crossroads community of Camden. At least 18 of the contributing buildings date between 1780 and 1820, with the remainder dated to the 19th century. Notable buildings include the Greek Revival style "Spruce Acres", Georgian style Mifflin House, the 1856 Whatcoat Methodist Church, Amity Lodge Building, Gov. George Truitt House, and a number of Italianate style dwellings.

It was added to the National Register of Historic Places in 1974.

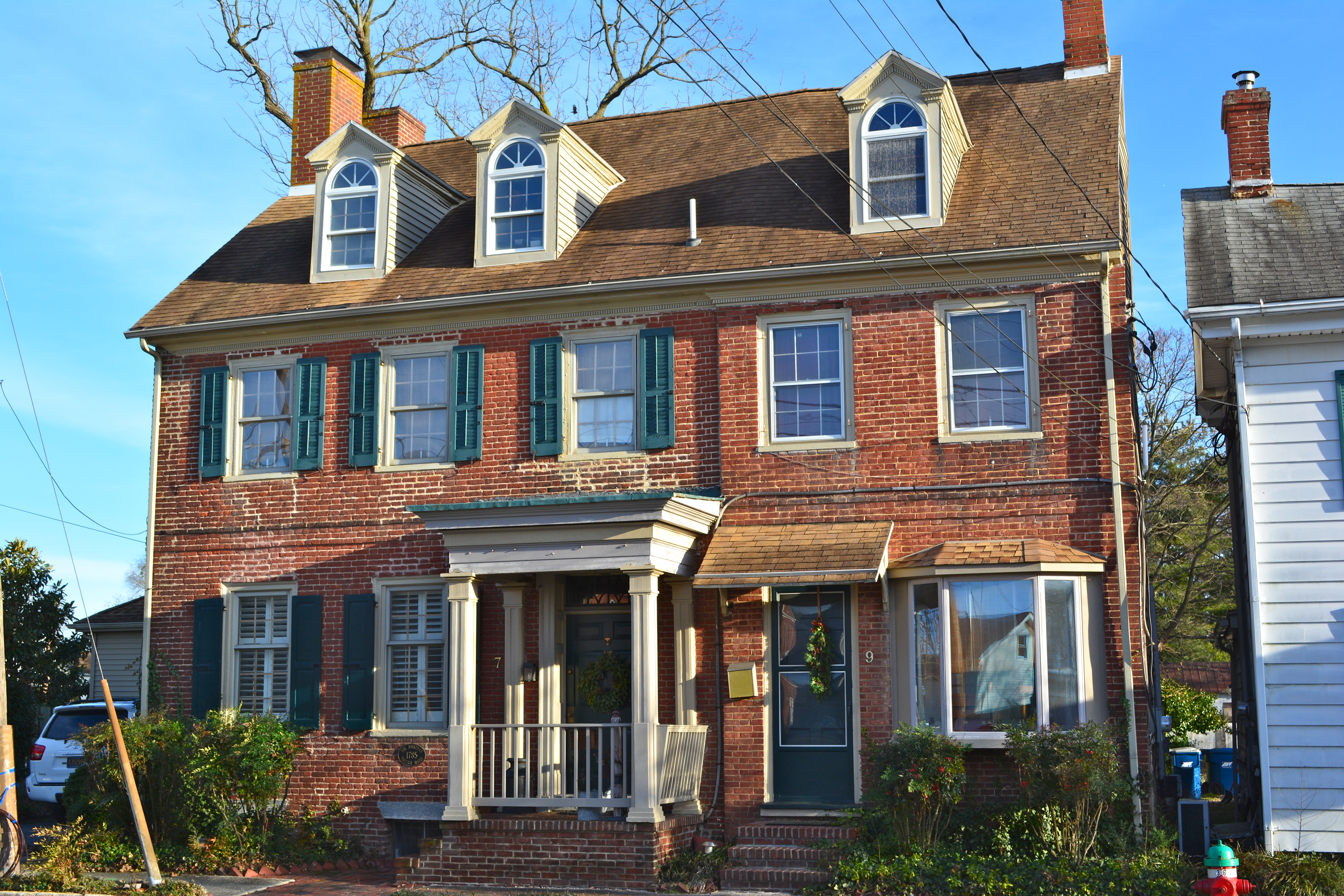
7-9 Main Street

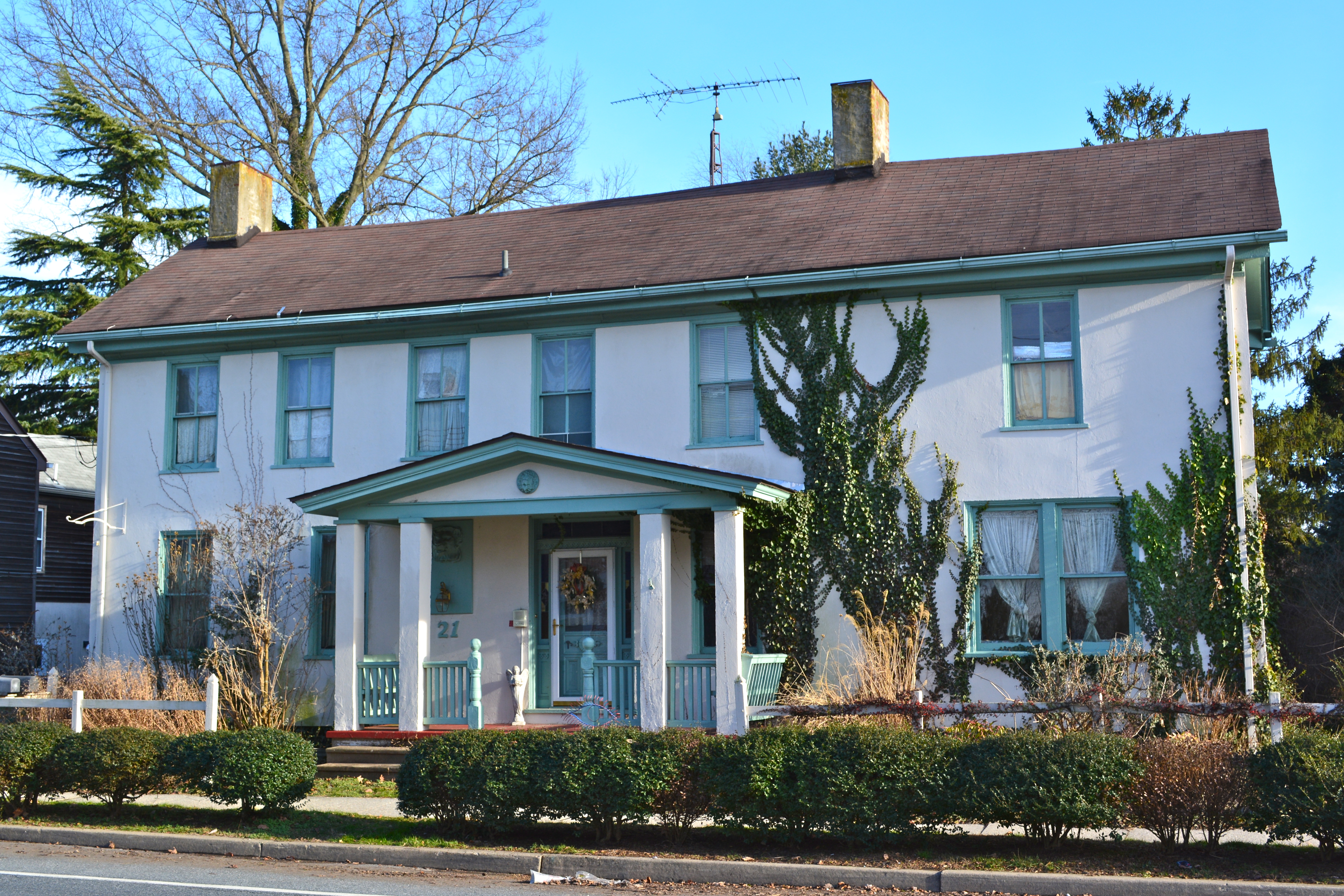
21 Main Street

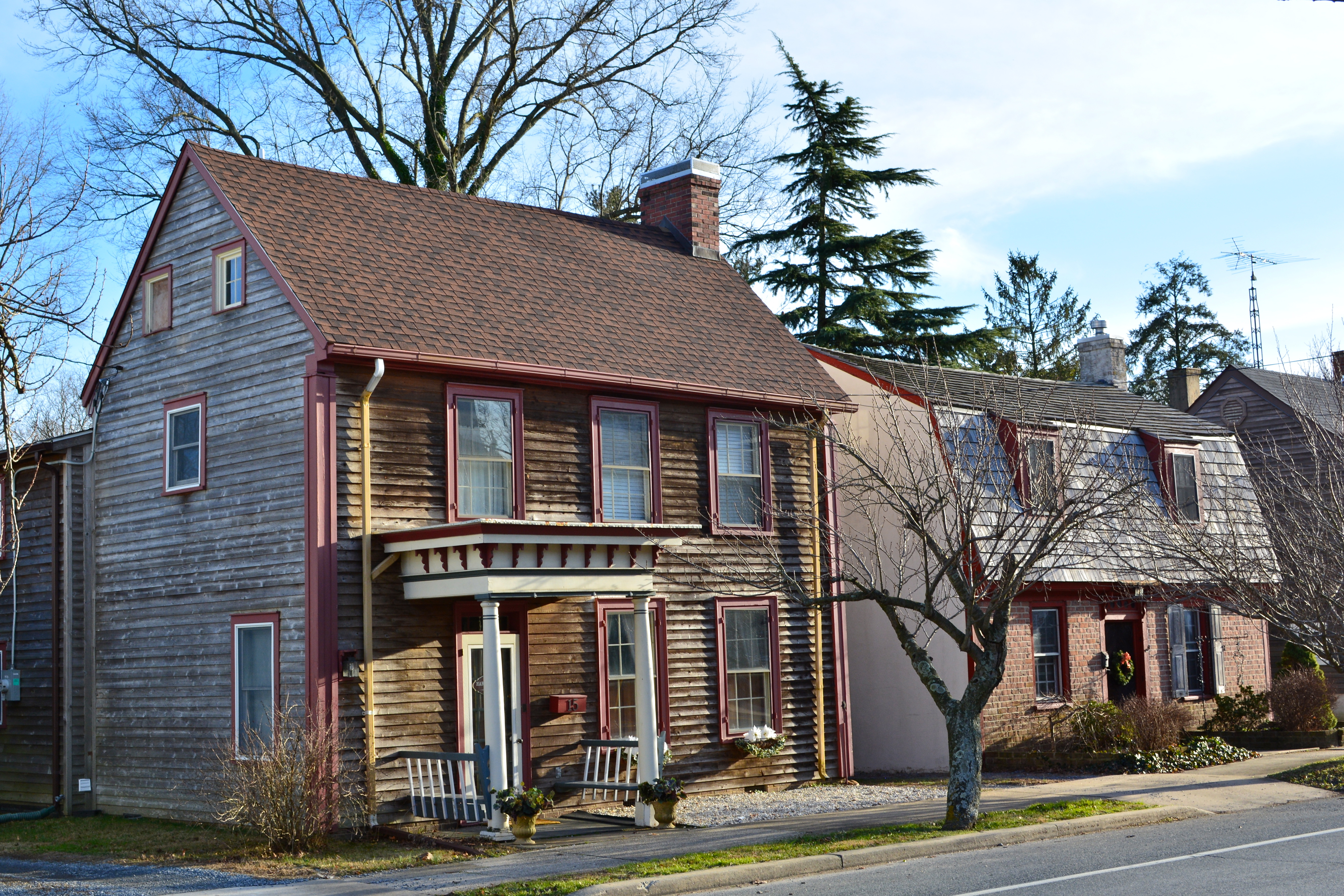
15 Main Street

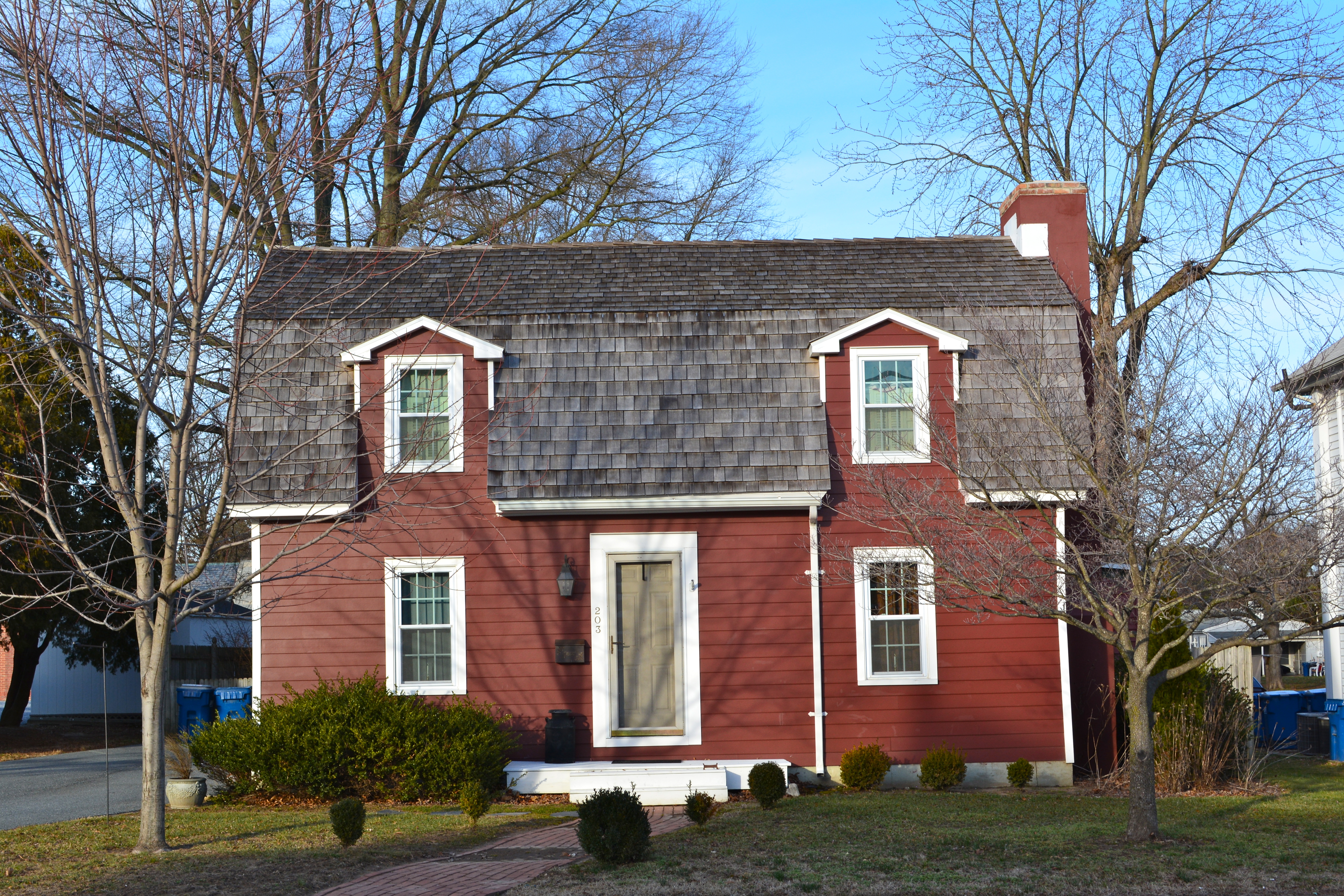
203 Camden-Wyoming Ave.
