= Great Geneva =

Historic house in Delaware, United States

- U.S. National Register of Historic Places
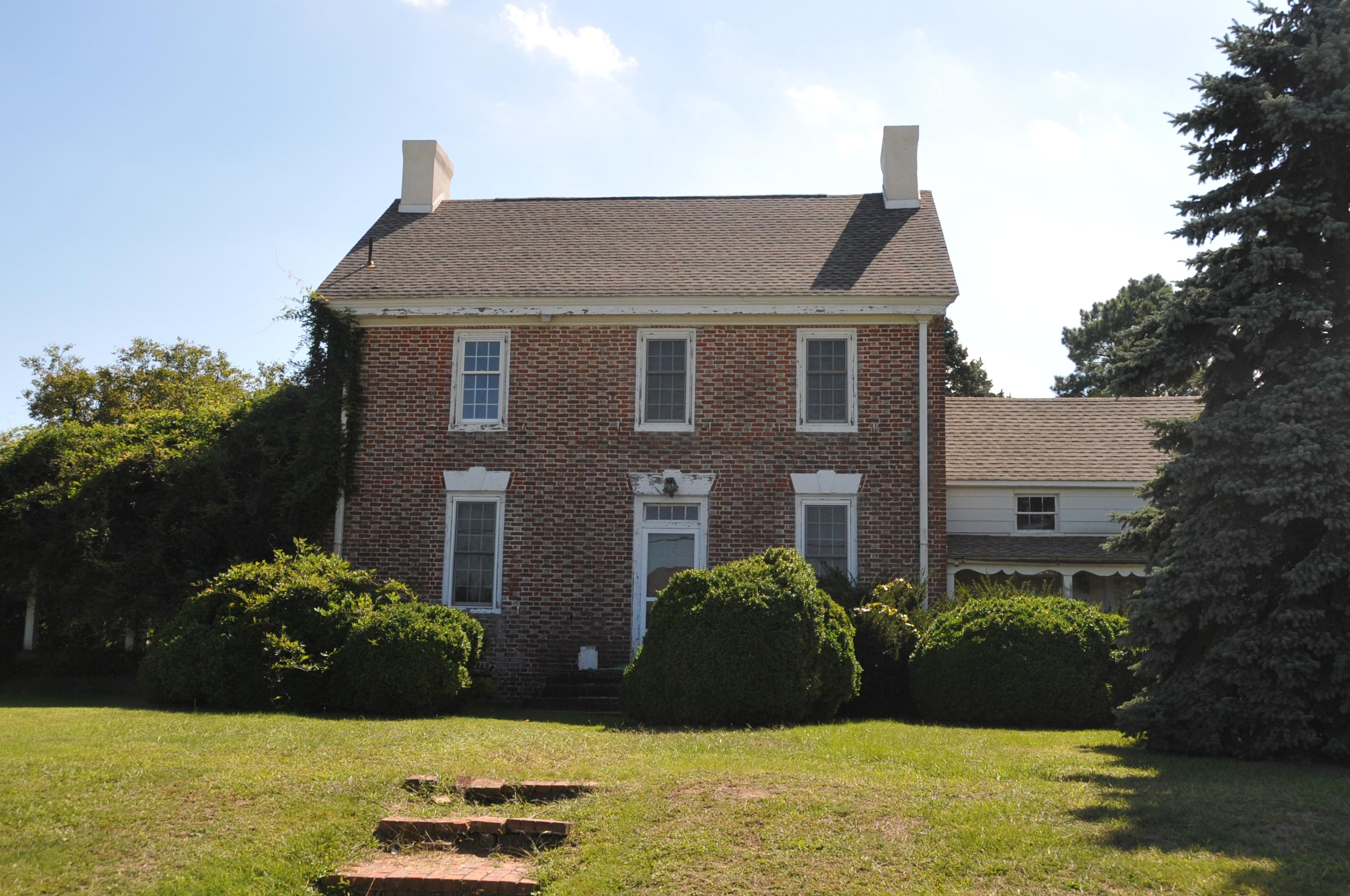
- Great Geneva, September 2012

- Location within Delaware Location within the United States
- Location: 3 miles south of Dover on Road 356, near Camden, Delaware
- Coordinates: 39°7′03″N 75°30′32″W
- Area: 1 acre (0.40 ha)
- Built: c. 1765
- NRHP reference No.: 73000489
- Added to NRHP: March 26, 1973

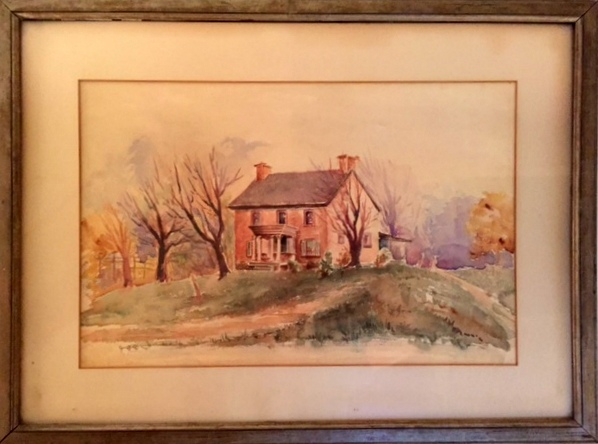
This is a watercolor painting of Great Geneva painted circa 1850 by Lydia Sharpless Hunn. It remains in the Hunn family.

Great Geneva is a historic home located near Camden, Kent County, Delaware. It was built in about 1765, and is a 2 1/2-story, brick, hall-and-parlor plan dwelling with a small frame kitchen wing. The layout is an adaptation of the Resurrection Manor plan. It is associated with the prominent Hunn family and the local Quaker community. The house was an important station on the Underground Railroad.

It was added to the National Register of Historic Places in 1973.

== Description ==
Situated to the north of the Tidbury Branch of St. Jones River, Great Geneva stands as a two-story-and-attic brick dwelling built in accordance with a hall and parlor plan. The house exhibits a northern facade designed with a Flemish bond pattern, featuring a box cornice, keyed lintels, and a rectangular transom positioned above the central entrance.

The rear wall of the house is constructed using English bond. Within the three southern bays, two doorways can be found, with one previously leading to a rear kitchen. This wing has since been replaced by a newer addition attached to the western gable wall.

The western gable wall showcases a Flemish bond with glazed headers, while the eastern gable has been stuccoed. The latter is further concealed by a recent extension housing bathrooms.

Notable original features on the ground floor are scarce. The present owners have added crown molding, chair railing, paneled end walls, and cupboards. Additionally, modern kitchen amenities now occupy the southeast room, created by installing a partition wall adjacent to the eastern fireplace breast.

The second floor has preserved some of its original elements more successfully. The western bed chamber boasts an original paneled end wall, chair railing, and cornice. The eastern chamber retains certain portions of its original detailing. Curiously, the second floor has been divided into four distinct spaces, with the two-bed chambers located to the south and a hallway and anteroom positioned to the north.

The basement, encompassed by brick foundation walls laid in English bond, comprises three fireplaces adorned with segmental brick arches. Inside, a water table exists, resulting in a decrease in wall thickness by one brick course between the basement and the first floor. Similarly, the wall thickness diminishes between the first and second floors.

== Significance ==
Great Geneva holds a significant historical association with the growth of the Friends community near Camden and the Hunn family's fortunes.

The Hunn lineage in Delaware traces its origins to Nathaniel Hunn of Boston. Following Nathaniel's demise in King Philip's War, his wife Priscilla remarried and relocated to Kent County, accompanied by her young children.

Jonathan Hunn, Priscilla Hunn's great-grandson, acquired the parcel of land known as Great Geneva before 1765 and likely constructed his residence around the same period. The land had originally been surveyed for Alexander Humphreys in 1683 and changed hands multiple times until the mid-18th century. In proximity to the Great Geneva property lies Brecknock, from which a portion was used by Daniel Mifflin in 1783 to establish Piccadilly, now known as Camden, which became a central hub for the Society of Friends in Delaware.

Generations of the Hunn family, including sons, grandsons, and great-grandsons of the original builder, resided at Great Geneva and continued their involvement within the Friends community. During the 19th century, they also actively participated in the abolitionist movement. Ezekiel and John, grandsons of Jonathan Hunn, were staunch opponents of slavery. The latter, a close associate of abolitionist Thomas Garrett, purportedly confided in his son about a diary documenting the Underground Railroad's activities in Delaware, urging its destruction. Before his son left the bedside, John inquired if the diary had been copied before its disposal. He reiterated his request to burn the diary, and his son, also named John, went on to serve as Delaware's governor from 1901 to 1905.

A different individual named John Hunn, who may or may not have been born at Great Geneva, received training for a seafaring career and commanded the privateer security in Delaware Bay during the Revolutionary War. Through this John Hunn, the Hunn family established connections with another notable Delaware family when his daughter married Caesar Augustus Rodney, who happened to be the nephew of Caesar Rodney.
