= John Dickinson House =

Historic house in Delaware, United States

- U.S. National Register of Historic Places
- U.S. National Historic Landmark
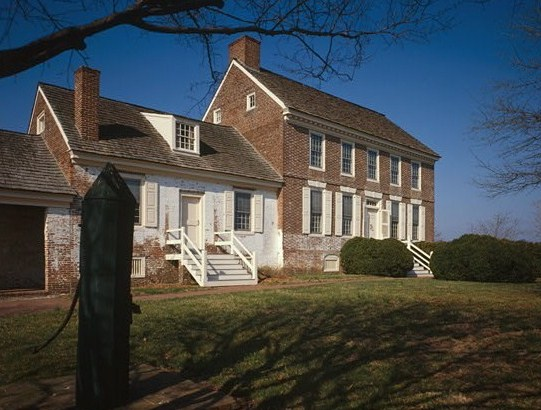
- John Dickinson House

- Location within Delaware Location within the United States
- Location: 340 Kitts Hummock Road, Dover, Delaware
- Coordinates: 39°6′10″N 75°26′58″W
- Built: 1739/40
- Architectural style: Georgian
- NRHP reference No.: 66000258

Significant dates
- Added to NRHP: October 15, 1966
- Designated NHL: January 20, 1961

The John Dickinson House, generally known as Poplar Hall, is a National Historic Landmark on the John Dickinson Plantation in Kent County, Delaware, 5 miles (8.0 km) south of Dover. It was the boyhood home and sometime residence of Founding Father John Dickinson (1732-1808), principal author of the Articles of Confederation and a drafter of the Constitution of the United States. The property is owned by the State of Delaware and run as a museum by the Delaware Division of Historical and Cultural Affairs. It became part of the First State National Historical Park in 2013.

The main house is an Early Georgian mansion and was built on a 13,000-acre (5,300 ha) plantation in 1739–40 by Judge Samuel Dickinson, the father of John Dickinson. Wings were added in 1752 and 1754. The house faced a nearby bend of the St. Jones River which is no longer there as the river has been straightened. The original house suffered major damage during a British raid in August 1781 and was nearly destroyed in a fire in 1804. John Dickinson lived there for extended periods only in 1776–77 and 1781–82, although he kept up a keen interest in the property and often visited. Purchased by the National Society of Colonial Dames of America in 1952, it was given to the State of Delaware and declared a National Historic Landmark in 1961.

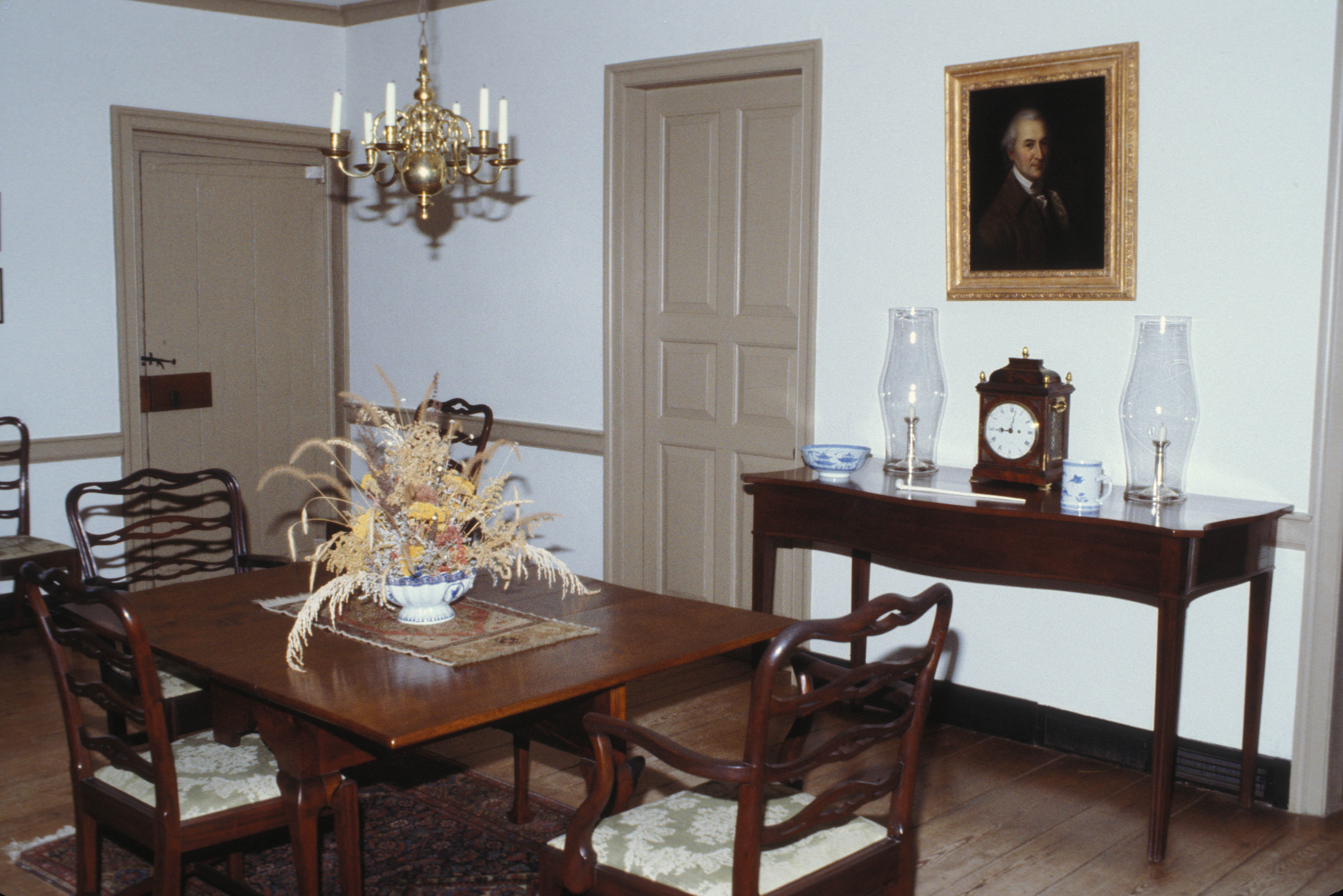
Interior

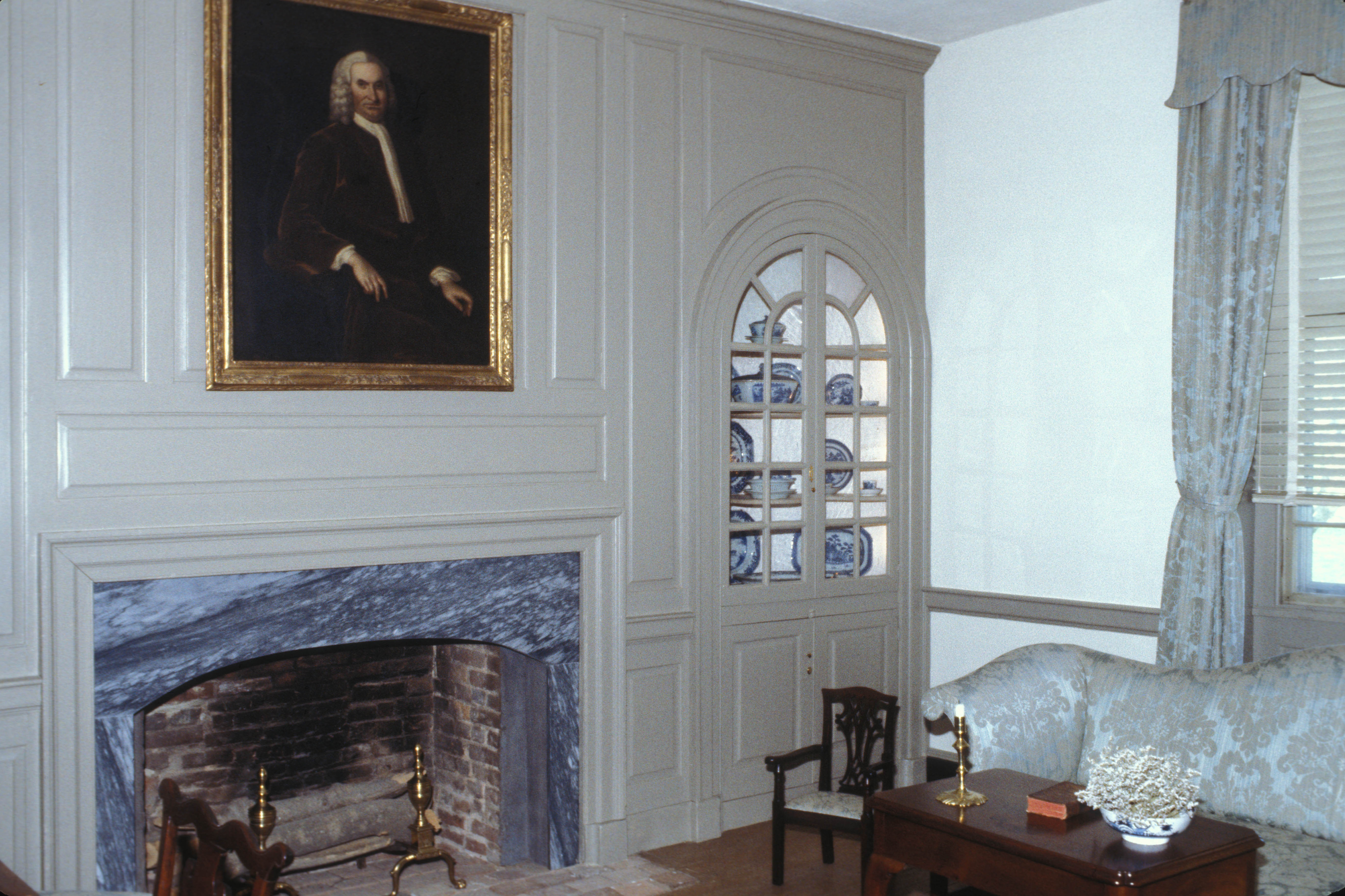
Interior

John Dickinson was a lawyer and politician who spent most of the time in Philadelphia, Pennsylvania, and Wilmington, Delaware. He was at various times a Continental Congressman from Pennsylvania and Delaware, a delegate to the Constitutional Convention in 1787, President of Delaware, and President of Pennsylvania. Among the wealthiest men in the American colonies, he became known as the Penman of the Revolution, for his Letters from a Farmer in Pennsylvania, where he eloquently argued the cause of American liberty. Although refusing to vote in favor of the Declaration of Independence in 1776, he supported the establishment of the new government during the American Revolution and afterward in many official capacities.
