= Kitts Hummock, Delaware =

Unincorporated community in Delaware, United States

- Unincorporated community
- Location within Delaware Location within the United States
- Coordinates: 39°6′9″N 75°24′8″W
- Country: United States
- State: Delaware
- County: Kent
- Elevation: 3 ft (0.91 m)
- Time zone: UTC-5 (Eastern (EST))
  - Summer (DST): UTC-4 (EDT)
- Area code: 302
- GNIS feature ID: 214198

Kitts Hummock is an unincorporated community in Kent County, Delaware, United States. Kitts Hummock is located on the Delaware Bay at the end of Kitts Hummock Road, southeast of Dover. It was originally named "Kidds Hammock" after 17th century pirate Captain William Kidd and rumors he buried treasure there. The "Hammock" referred to is the ecological version, meaning a stand of hardwood trees, and the name was inadvertently changed by employees of the Delaware Department of Transportation. A hummock is a similar rise in elevation, leading some to believe the reasoning behind the name.

Kitts Hummock Beach is an official sanctuary for horseshoe crabs, the state marine animal of Delaware and a "signature species" of the Delaware Bay Estuary.
