= Leipsic, Delaware =

- Town
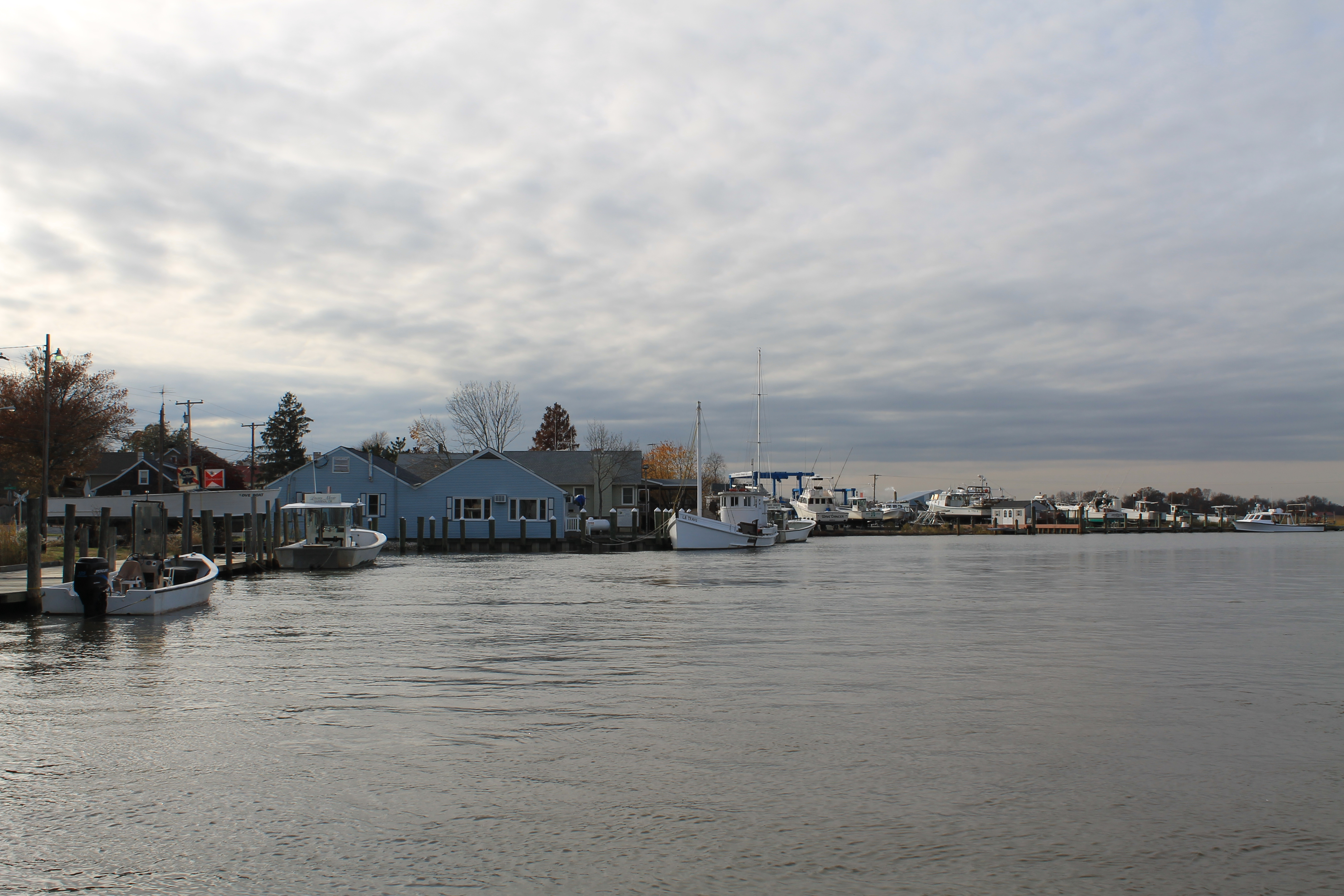
- Leipsic waterfront along the Leipsic River

- Seal Logo

- Location of Leipsic in Kent County, Delaware.

- Location within the state of Delaware Leipsic (the United States)
- Coordinates: 39°14′27″N 75°31′01″W
- Country: United States
- State: Delaware
- County: Kent

Government
  - Mayor: Samuel J. Fox IV

Area
  - Total: 0.32 sq mi (0.84 km^{2})
  - Land: 0.30 sq mi (0.77 km^{2})
  - Water: 0.027 sq mi (0.07 km^{2})
- Elevation: 7 ft (2.1 m)

Population (2020)
  - Total: 178
  - Density: 599.6/sq mi (231.52/km^{2})
- Time zone: UTC-5 (Eastern (EST))
  - Summer (DST): UTC-4 (EDT)
- ZIP code: 19901
- Area code: 302
- FIPS code: 10-41700
- GNIS feature ID: 214213
- Website: leipsic.delaware.gov

Leipsic is a town in Kent County, Delaware, United States. It is part of the Dover metropolitan area. The population was 178 in 2020.

== History ==
A post office called Leipsic was established in 1839, and remained in operation until 1902. The name is a variation of Leipzig, one of the largest cities in eastern Germany.

== Geography ==
According to the United States Census Bureau, the town has a total area of 0.3 square miles (0.78 km^{2}), of which 0.3 square miles (0.78 km^{2}) is land and 0.04 square miles (0.10 km^{2}) (6.67%) is water.

The Leipsic River flows through the town on the southern edge of the Bombay Hook National Wildlife Refuge.

== Demographics ==
Historical population
Census	Pop.	Note	%±
1880	407		—
1890	355		−12.8%
1900	305		−14.1%
1910	271		−11.1%
1920	244		−10.0%
1930	254		4.1%
1940	210		−17.3%
1950	253		20.5%
1960	281		11.1%
1970	247		−12.1%
1980	228		−7.7%
1990	236		3.5%
2000	203		−14.0%
2010	183		−9.9%
2020	178		−2.7%
U.S. Decennial Census

As of the census of 2000, there were 203 people, 79 households, and 48 families residing in the town. The population density was 722.0 inhabitants per square mile (278.8/km^{2}). There were 89 housing units at an average density of 316.6 units per square mile (122.2 units/km^{2}). The racial makeup of the town was 93.10% White, 1.97% Native American, 0.99% Asian, 0.49% from other races, and 3.45% from two or more races. Hispanic or Latino of any race were 2.46% of the population.

There were 79 households, out of which 31.6% had children under the age of 18 living with them, 41.8% were married couples living together, 10.1% had a female householder with no husband present, and 39.2% were non-families. 26.6% of all households were made up of individuals, and 7.6% had someone living alone who was 65 years of age or older. The average household size was 2.57 and the average family size was 3.21.

In the town the age demographic was as follows: 29.1% of the residents were under the age of 18, 8.4% ranged in age from 18 to 24, 26.1% from 25 to 44, 25.1% from 45 to 64, and 11.3% were 65 years of age or older. The median age was 36 years. For every 100 females there were 82.9 males. For every 100 females age 18 and over, there were 92.0 males.

The median income for a household in the town was $37,656, and the median income for a family was $39,219. Males had a median income of $35,156 versus $22,500 for females. The per capita income for the town was $13,825. About 10.2% of families and 14.9% of the population were below the poverty line, including 20.0% of those under the age of eighteen and none of those sixty-five or over.

== Education ==
Portions south of the Leipsic River are in the Capital School District. Portions north of the river are in the Smyrna School District.

Dover High School is the comprehensive high school of the Capital school district. Smyrna High School is the comprehensive high school of the Smyrna school district.

== Infrastructure ==
=== Transportation ===
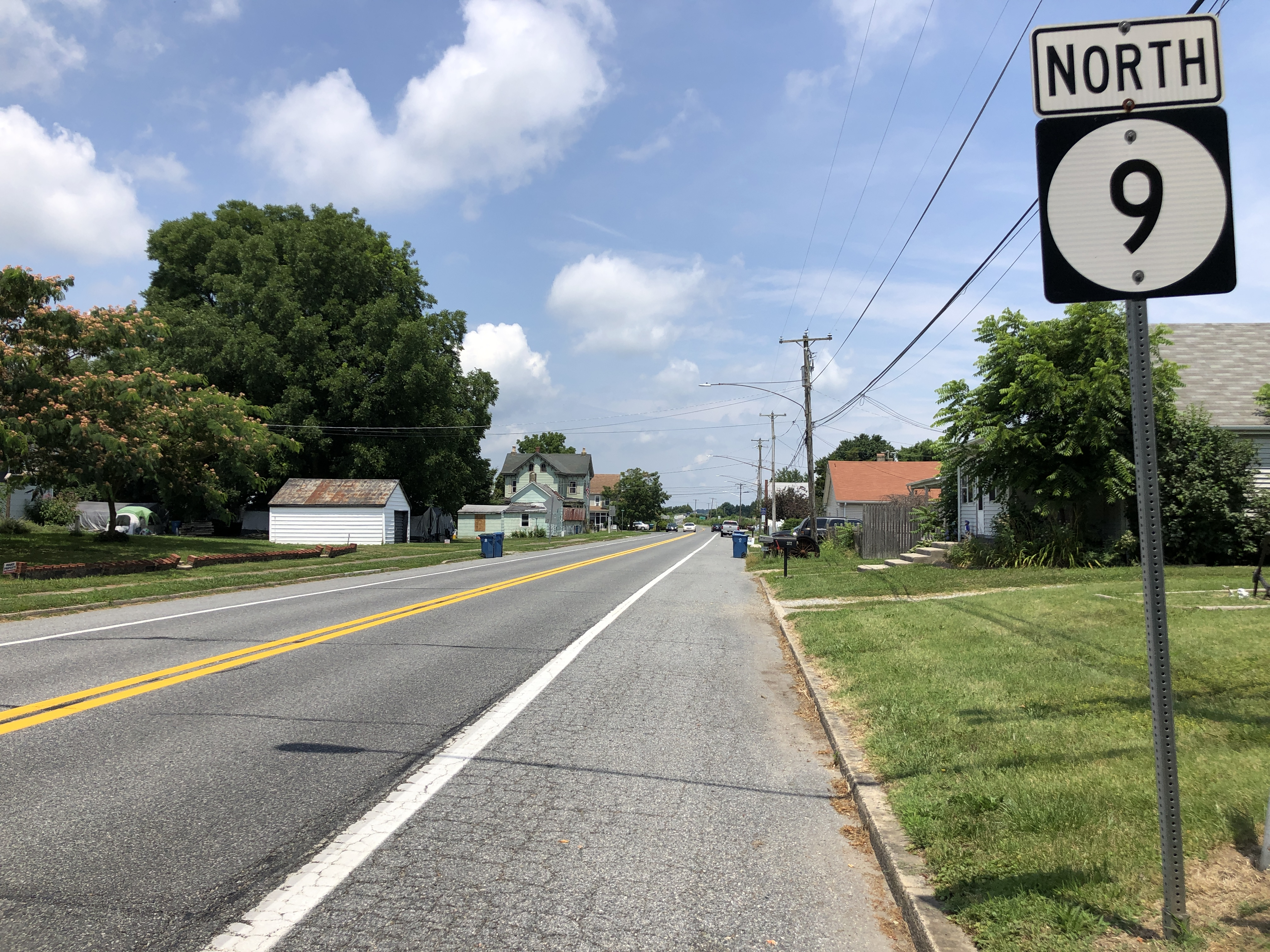
DE 9 northbound in Leipsic

Delaware Route 9, a scenic route running near the Delaware Bay, passes north–south through Leipsic along Denny Street, heading north toward the Bombay Hook National Wildlife Refuge and south toward Little Creek. Delaware Route 42 begins at DE 9 in Leipsic and heads west along Fast Landing Road toward Cheswold and an intersection with U.S. Route 13. Smyrna-Leipsic Road splits northwest from DE 9 north of Leipsic and heads toward Smyrna. Leipsic Road begins at DE 9 south of Leipsic and heads southwest toward Dover.

=== Utilities ===
Delmarva Power, a subsidiary of Exelon, provides electricity to Leipsic. Chesapeake Utilities provides natural gas to the town.

== Notable people ==
- William Jackson Palmer, Civil War general and railroad developer
