= George Floyd protests in Delaware =

2020 civil unrest after the murder of George Floyd

- Part of George Floyd protests
- Date: May 28 – June 13, 2020 (2 weeks and 2 days)
- Location: Delaware, United States
- Caused by: Police brutality; Institutional racism against African Americans; Reaction to the murder of George Floyd; Economic, racial and social inequality

Cities in Delaware that held a protest with approximately 100 or more participants

This is a list of George Floyd protests in Delaware, United States.

== Locations ==
=== Camden ===
On June 9, a group of protesters marched along U.S. Route 13 in Camden, blocking traffic and defying police orders. 21 protesters were detained, including Dover Post reporter Andre Lamar.

=== Dover ===
On May 31, over 200 protesters gathered in Dover outside the Dover Police Department and Delaware Legislative Hall before marching north along U.S. Route 13, causing portions of the road to be closed. Looting took place at two stores at the Dover Mall before police secured the mall. The protesters then made their way to the Delaware State Police headquarters. Mayor Robin Christiansen declared a state of emergency and issued a curfew going into effect at 9pm on Sunday night.

On June 12, the Delaware Law Enforcement Memorial was damaged and urinated on.

=== Frankford ===
On June 2, about 25 protesters laid down on their stomachs outside the Frankford Volunteer Fire Company's fire hall for nine minutes to honor George Floyd. Several police officers kneeled with them in solidarity. The group then gathered in the parking lot and stood in a circle as they recited the Lord's Prayer.

=== Georgetown ===
On June 3, approximately 200 people gathered at the Georgetown Circle in Georgetown to peacefully protest police brutality.

=== Middletown ===
On June 4, hundreds of people marched from Food Lion to Louis L. Redding Middle School in Middletown, with a rally being held there and later at the Middletown Police Station. On June 7, hundreds of protesters held a march to protest police brutality and honor the memory of George Floyd. The event began with nine prayers to represent the amount of time Derek Chauvin's knee was on Floyd's neck while he was murdering Floyd, then the protesters marched from Broad and Main Street through downtown Middletown.

=== Newark ===
On June 13, hundreds of protesters gathered at Lumbrook Park and marched down Main Street and Delaware Avenue in Newark with an additional protest planned on June 14. The protest on the 14th would be the fourth protest in the city.

=== Rehoboth Beach ===
About 30 protesters gathered in Rehoboth Beach at the Rehoboth Beach Bandstand on June 1. The protesters then marched to Rehoboth City Hall, with the crowd growing to 50 protesters. A protest took place June 5 at 4 pm along Delaware Route 1 (Coastal Highway) by Southern Delaware Alliance for Racial Justice and Women's March Sussex, with up to 500 people in attendance.

=== Seaford ===
On May 31, hundreds of protesters gathered in Seaford at Soroptimist Park and marched to Gateway Park and back to protest the murder of George Floyd.

=== Wilmington ===
On May 30, hundreds of protesters peacefully marched and blocked part of Interstate 95 in Wilmington for several hours. The protests were led by Black Lives Matter and Food Not Bombs. Subsequently, on the evening of May 30, several dozens businesses in downtown were looted including a jewelry store, sporting goods store and local restaurants. Many businesses spared had "black owned" signs. A police vehicle and personal vehicles of local residents were smashed including in the Trolley Square neighborhood.

On May 31, Joe Biden and U.S. Representative Lisa Blunt Rochester toured the areas damaged in the protest and spoke with residents.

On June 5, another protest was held in the Tubman-Garrett Riverfront park, and a march to the New Castle County Courthouse to inspire reform and honor the death of Jeremy "Bam Bam" McDole. McDole was a man using a wheelchair who was killed in 2015 by Wilmington Police. Demonstrators also marched onto Interstate 95 and kneeled. Protesters were joined by several police officers, who walked with the group for 8 minutes. The protests were also attended by politicians including Governor John Carney, State Senator Darius Brown, Mayor Mike Purzycki, and U.S. Representative Blunt Rochester.
