= Victorian Dover Historic District =

Historic district in Delaware, United States

- U.S. National Register of Historic Places
- U.S. Historic district
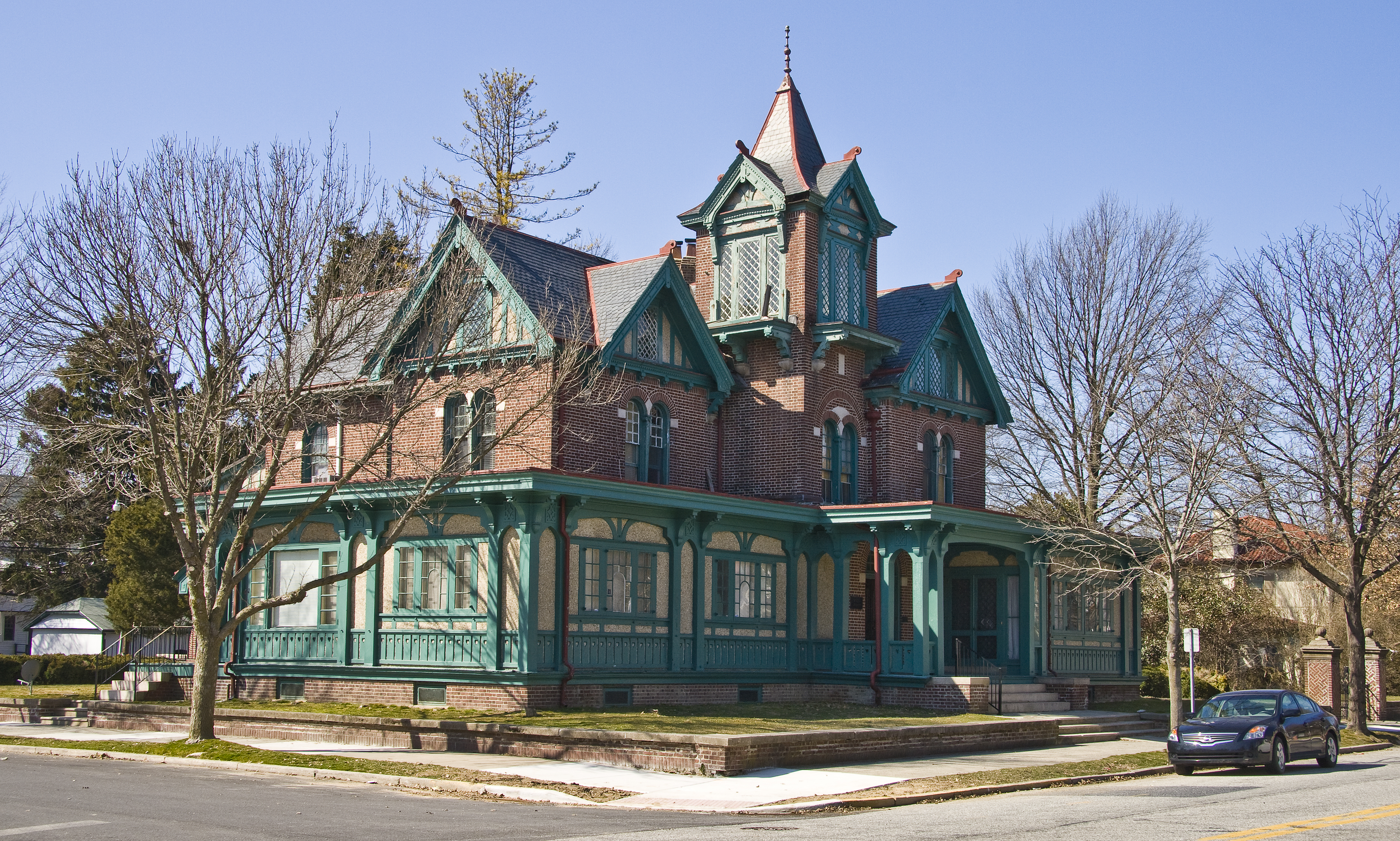
- Houses in the Victorian Dover Historic District, March 2010

- Location within Delaware Location within the United States
- Location: Roughly bounded by Silver Lake, St. Jones River, North and Queen Sts., Dover, Delaware
- Coordinates: 39°09′51″N 75°31′35″W
- Area: 179 acres (72 ha)
- Built by: Bradford, Rev. Thomas B.
- Architectural style: Colonial Revival, Queen Anne, Gothic Revival
- NRHP reference No.: 79000622
- Added to NRHP: July 16, 1979

Victorian Dover Historic District is a national historic district located at Dover, Kent County, Delaware. It encompasses 482 contributing buildings representative of the community's commercial, domestic and industrial development between the first quarter of the 19th century and the first quarter of the 20th century. Notable buildings include the Wesley United Methodist Church (c. 1850), Whatcoat United Methodist Church (1871-1872), Dover's Railroad Station (1860s, 1911), Capitol Theatre (1903-1904), and Priscilla Block (1896). Located in the district is the separately listed John Bullen House.

It was added to the National Register of Historic Places in 1979.
