= Christ Church, Dover =

Christ Church, Dover may refer to

- Christ Church (Dover, Delaware), United States
- Christ Church, Dover, Kent, England

== See also ==
- Dover, Christ Church, Barbados
