= Dover Post =

Weekly newspaper in Dover, Delaware

The Dover Post
- Type: Weekly newspaper
- Owner: USA Today Co.
- Publisher: Amy Newton
- News editor: Adam Koppeser
- Founded: 1975; 51 years ago
- Headquarters: 1196 S. Little Creek Rd. Dover, Delaware 19901
- Country: United States
- Price: $1.00
- Website: doverpost.com

The Dover Post is a weekly newspaper based in Dover, Delaware and founded in 1975. It is part of the USA TODAY Network.

GateHouse Media bought the Dover Post from the newspaper's founder and longtime publisher, Jim Flood, Sr., in 2008. In 2019, GateHouse Media merged with Gannett, now the USA TODAY Co., which also owns the Wilmington News Journal and several other local publications.

Flood established the Dover Post with a staff of 11. The paper struggled financially and faced competition from the Delaware State News. "To begin with we were tucked into two rooms in Treadway Towers," Flood wrote on the Post's 40th anniversary in 2015. "The cost of the two rooms became a little too much to handle and it wasn't long before the whole staff was crammed into one room." On the paper's one-year anniversary, Flood had free copies delivered across Dover. In time, the Post expanded, moving into a larger space that could accommodate a printing operation.

In 2017, printing of the Dover Post was moved to the News Journal plant in New Castle. In 2021, Gannett announced the Dover Post website, along with other local publications owned by the company, would merge with Delaware Online, at delawareonline.com. The company said print editions for the merged papers would continue "unchanged."
