= Palmer Home =

- U.S. National Register of Historic Places
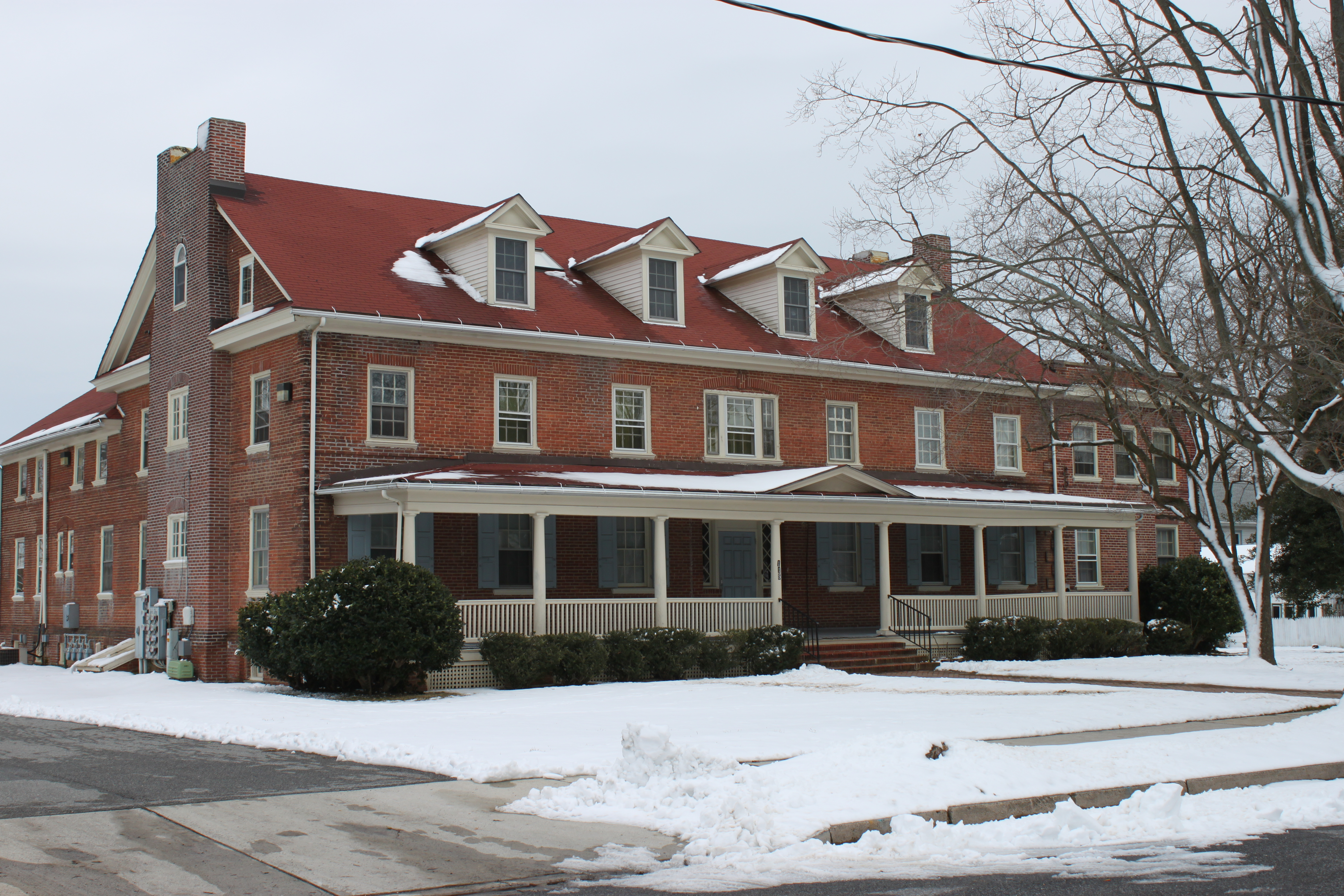
- The Palmer Home in 2011

- Location within Delaware Location within the United States
- Location: 115 American Ave., Dover, Delaware
- Coordinates: 39°9′50″N 75°31′31″W
- Area: 1.1 acres (0.45 ha)
- Built: 1907
- Architect: Vaux, William S.
- Architectural style: Colonial Revival
- NRHP reference No.: 88001443
- Added to NRHP: September 13, 1988

Palmer Home is a historic home for the aged located at Dover, Kent County, Delaware. It was built in 1907, and is a 2 1/2-story, brick structure with a gable roof in the Colonial Revival style. A two-story, flat roofed wing was added in 1930. The front facade features a hip roofed porch with Doric order columns and a square balustrade. It was built by the woman's organization The King's Daughters, and remained in operation until 1987.

It was added to the National Register of Historic Places in 1988.
