= Macomb Farm =

Historic house in Delaware, United States

- U.S. National Register of Historic Places
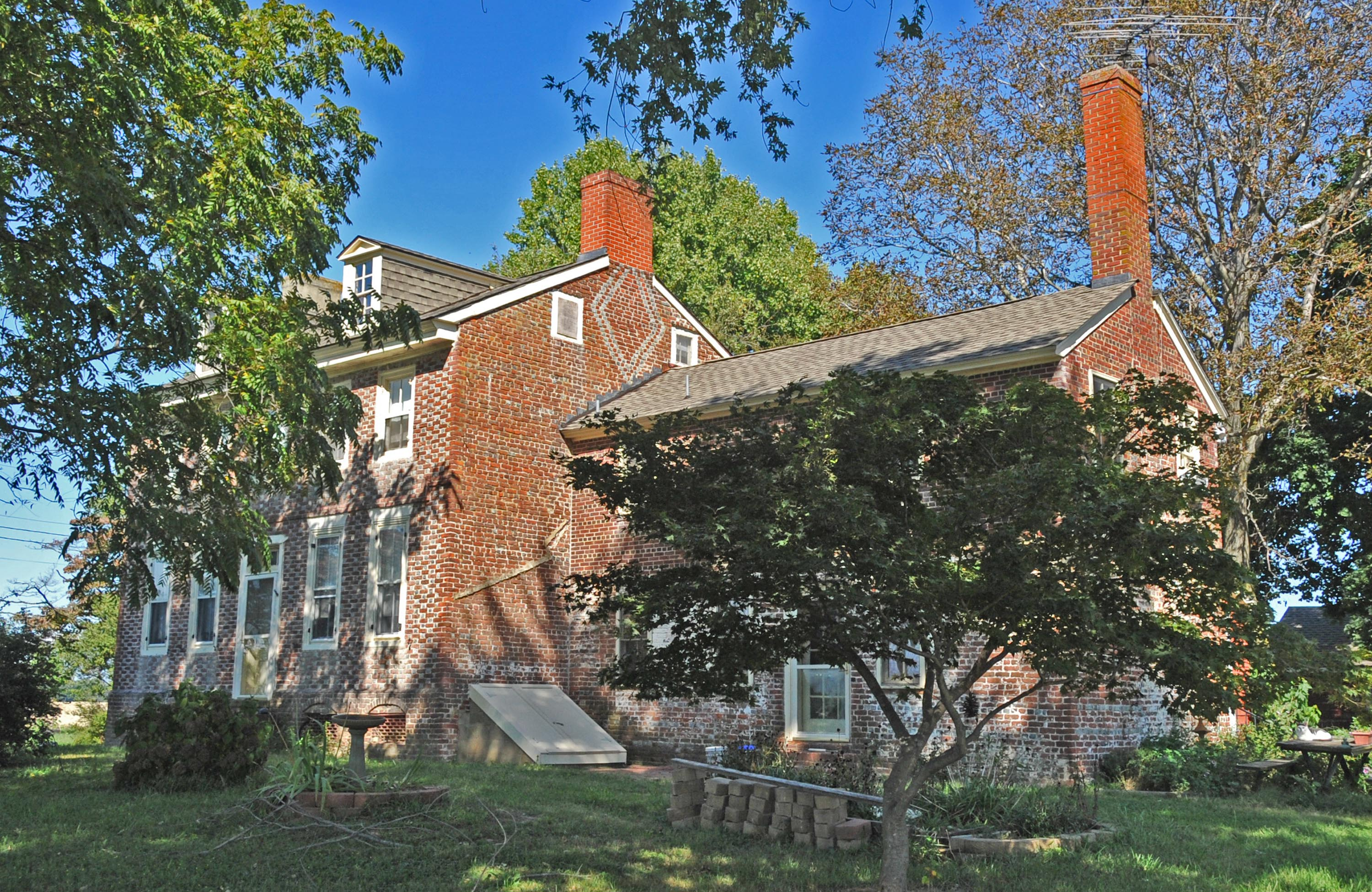

- Location within Delaware Location within the United States
- Location: Long Point Rd. off DE 8, Dover, Delaware
- Coordinates: 39°10′58″N 75°28′38″W
- Area: 4 acres (1.6 ha)
- NRHP reference No.: 74000597
- Added to NRHP: December 2, 1974

Macomb Farm, also known as the Thomas Irons House, is a historic home located at Dover, Delaware. It dates to the 18th century, and is a two-story, brick dwelling. It has a brick wing extending the original house. The interior is arranged according to the so-called Quaker or Penn plan.

It was added to the National Register of Historic Places in 1974.
