= Dover Green Historic District =

Historic district in Delaware, United States

- U.S. National Register of Historic Places
- U.S. Historic district
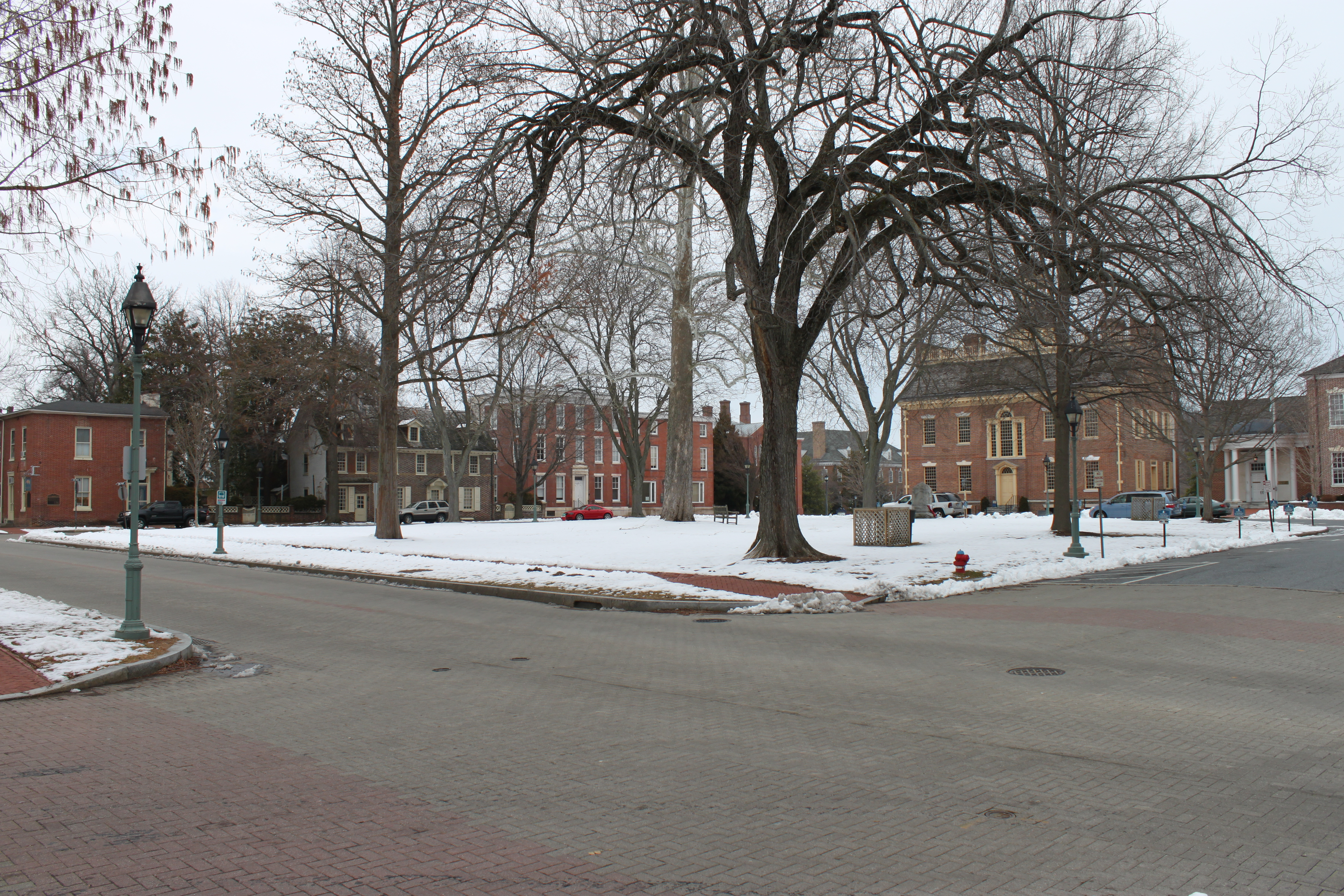
- Dover Green Historic District, January 2011

- Location within Delaware Location within the United States
- Location: Bounded by Governors Ave., North, South, and East Sts., Dover, Delaware
- Coordinates: 39°09′05″N 75°32′13″W
- Area: 50.1 acres (20.3 ha)
- Architect: Reynolds, Alonzo
- Architectural style: Colonial Revival, Italianate, Georgian
- NRHP reference No.: 77000383
- Added to NRHP: May 5, 1977

Dover Green Historic District is a national historic district located at Dover, Kent County, Delaware. It encompasses 79 contributing buildings centered on The Green and including most of the inhabited part of 18th century Dover. Notable buildings include the Eagle Tavern (bef. 1791), Kent County Court House (1875), Baptist Church-Dover Century Club (1852), King Dougall House and Store House, Parke-Ridgely House (1728), and a number of 19th century Italianate-style commercial buildings. Also located in the district are the separately listed Bradford-Loockerman House, Christ Church, and Old Statehouse.

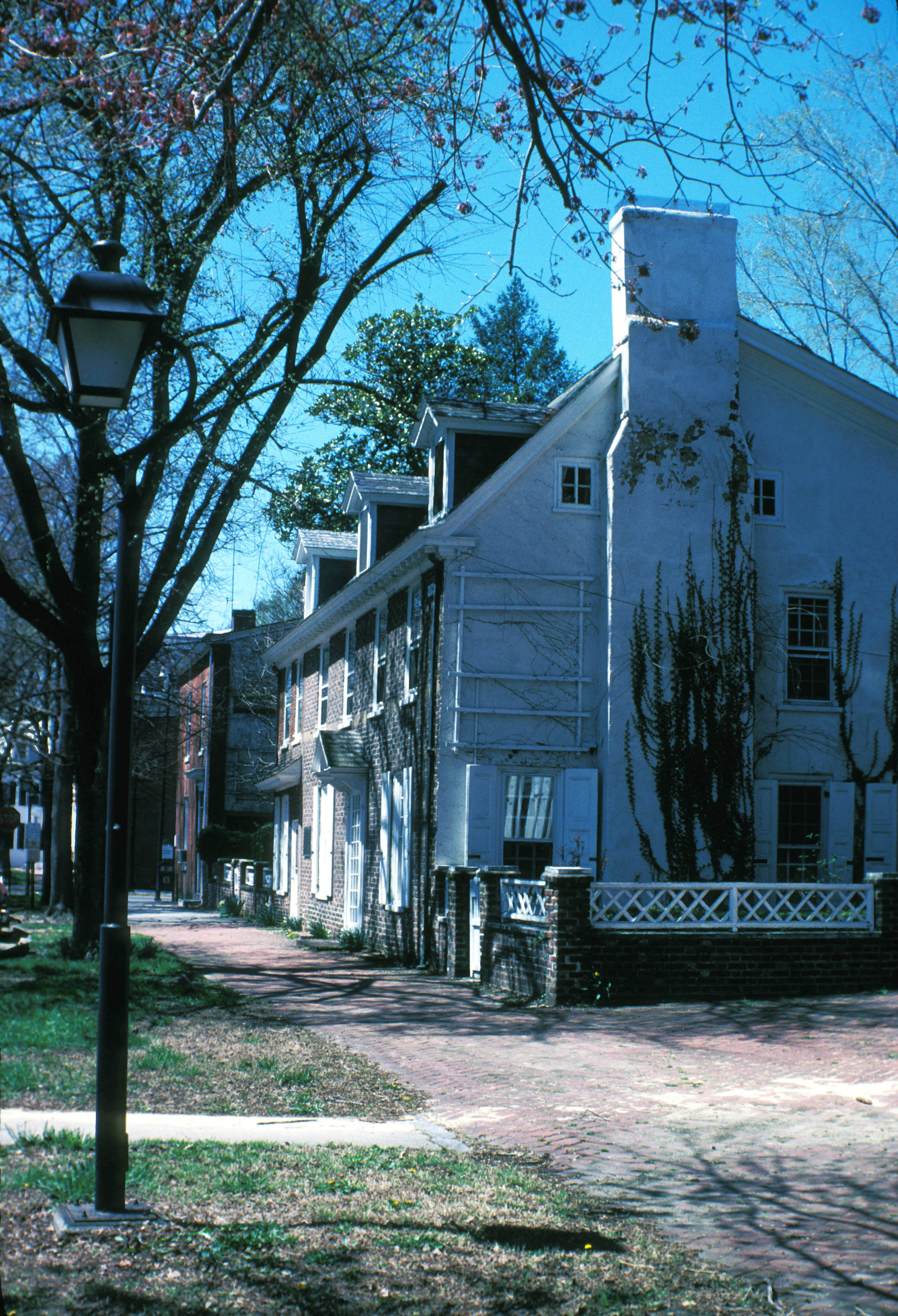
Parke-Ridgley House

It was added to the National Register of Historic Places in 1977. The Green also became part of First State National Historical Park on March 25, 2013, and is administered in cooperation with the National Park Service.
