= Tyn Head Court =

Historic house in Delaware, United States

- U.S. National Register of Historic Places
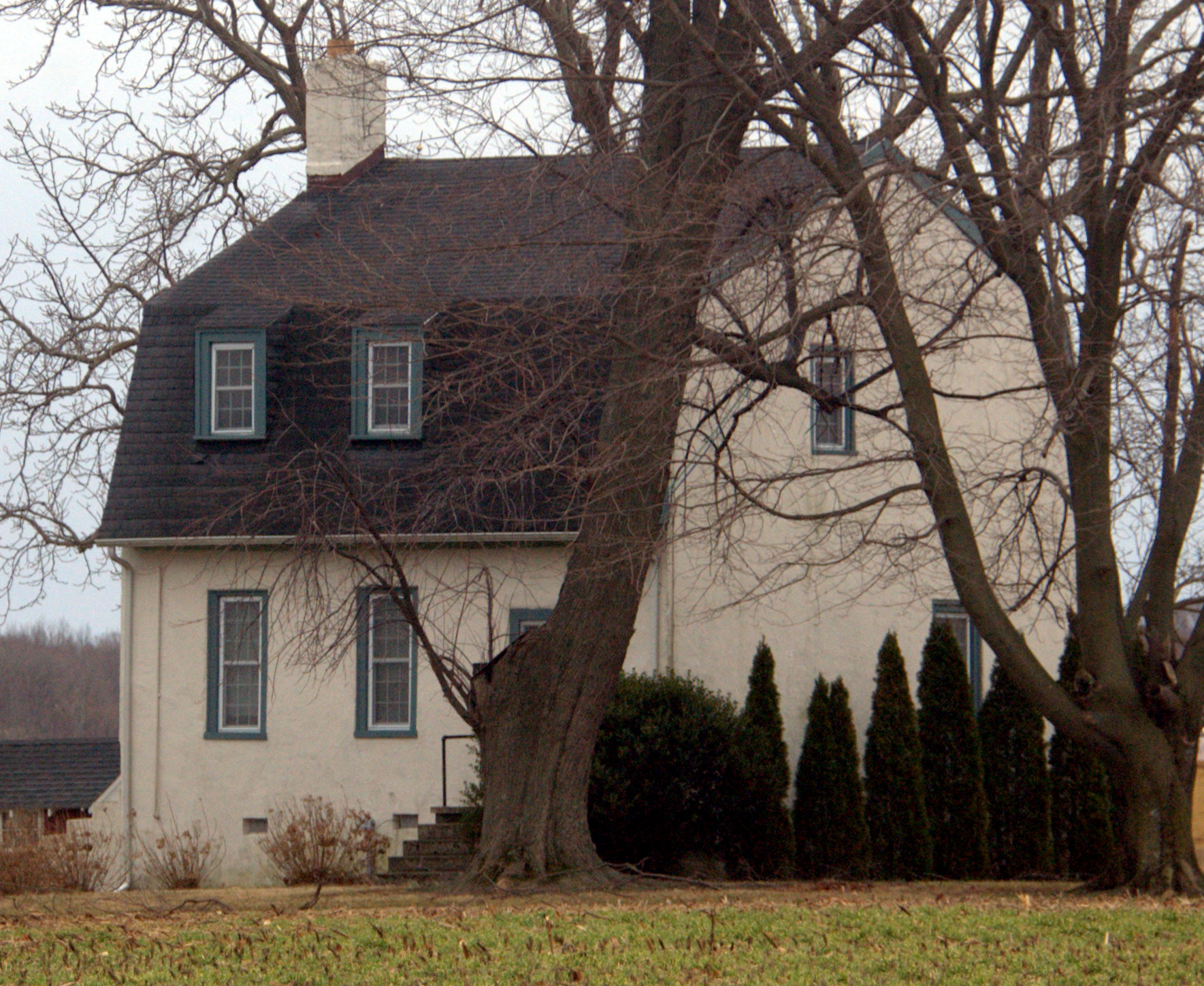

- Location within Delaware Location within the United States
- Location: East of Dover on S. Little Creek Rd., near Dover, Delaware
- Coordinates: 39°9′15″N 75°28′36″W
- Area: 5 acres (2.0 ha)
- Built: c. 1740
- NRHP reference No.: 73000490
- Added to NRHP: March 1, 1973

Tyn Head Court, later known as Wethered Court, is a historic home located east of Dover, Delaware. The main home dates to about 1740, and is a two-story, three-bay, stuccoed brick dwelling with a gambrel roof. It is listed in National Register of Historic Places.

== History ==
Prior to 1680, under the government of the Duke of York, Griffth Jones and John Glover established a 650-acre tract called Tyn Head Court. In 1681, Jones and Glover, who had become prominent, were given patents to the land by William Penn's government.

Later, Robert French acquired the Tyn Head tract of 700 acres, willing it to his daughter Catherine in 1713. Catherine married John Shannon. They split the tract between their two daughters, Mary and Ann.

Ann Shannon married Major John Patton, an officer in the 1st Delaware Regiment during the Revolutionary War. He was captured by the British in 1780 in the Battle of Camden Court House.

The Patton tract included a frame house. Mary Shannon married James Svkes, a Lieutenant in Caesar Rodney's Company, who was a delegate to the Continental Congresses of 1777 and 1778. Sykes was also a delegate to the State Constitutional Convention. On the Sykes tract, the surviving brick, gambrel-roofed house was erected, sometime before 1780. The Sykes tract and house were inherited by their daughter, Mary, who married John Wethered. The property became known as Wethered Court.

In 1816, Wethered Court was bought by William Heverin, a shipowner, grain merchant, and farmer. Heverin added a lower brick wing to the south of the main portion. The wing contained a kitchen with servant's quarters above. Heverin sold Wethered Court in 1871. Thereafter the house was occupied by various farmers and tenants. The south wing was removed in 1954.

== Design ==
Wethered Court, a three-bay gambrel-roofed structure, is constructed of brick and completely stuccoed. The front (west facade) is distinguished by a shallow box cornice with simple moulding, and a beveled water table. Three shed-roofed dormers form the roof. Details include a rectangular light over the entry and segmental arch supports over the basement windows.The rear (east facade) matches the front with the exception of the absence of a water table and entry over-light.

The roof is pierced by two dormers, located over the center and south bays. The north facade is marked by two asymmetric windows. The south facade retains evidence of a lower wing, originally flush with the east facade. Two windows, both on the first floor, remain; the east window is modern and occupies the position of the portal connection to the south wing.

The first floor is divided into two rooms with a north hall. An open stair occupies the northeast corner. Two interior doors are located on the south partition wall. Of the original detailing, a chair rail along the south wall remains. The east room is obscured by modern kitchen appliances and cabinetry.

The west room, however, retains its chair railing and crown molding. A corner fireplace, now sealed, is complete with bracketed mantel and breast paneling; a cupboard remains in the southwest corner.

The second floor is a mixture of remaining original woodwork and later paneling. It is divided into a central hall with three chambers and a modern bathroom. The basement is contained by common bond brick foundation walls. To the south are two corner fireplaces, which adjoin a supporting partition wall. The floor remains unfinished.
