= Bradford-Loockerman House =

Historic house in Delaware, United States

- U.S. National Register of Historic Places
- U.S. Historic district – Contributing property
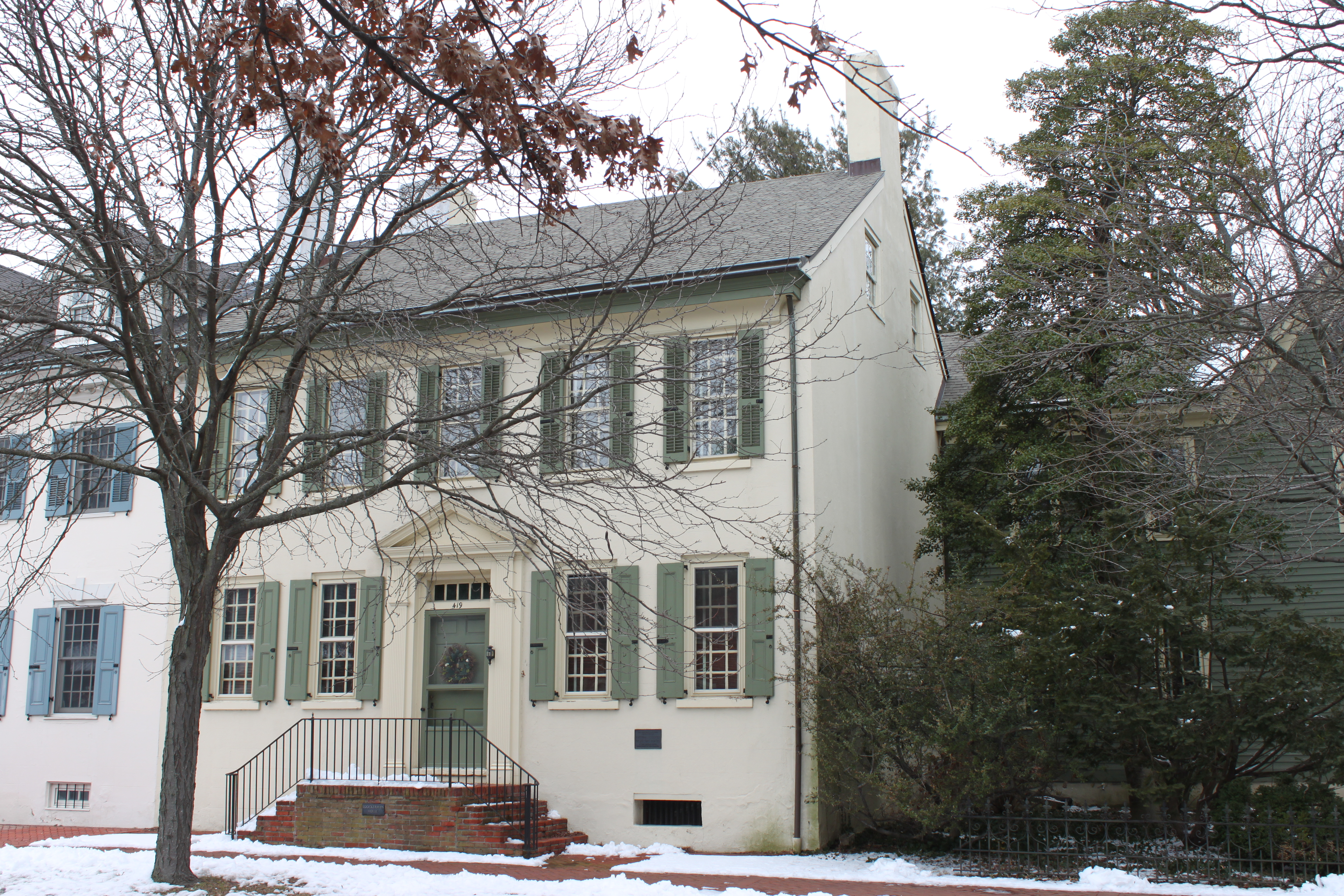
- Bradford-Loockerman House, January 2011

- Location within Delaware Location within the United States
- Location: 419 S. State St., Dover, Delaware
- Coordinates: 39°9′19″N 75°31′24″W
- Area: 0.3 acres (0.12 ha)
- Built: 1742
- Built by: Loockerman, Vincent
- NRHP reference No.: 72000277
- Added to NRHP: November 30, 1972

Bradford-Loockerman House, also known as the Loockerman House, is a historic home located at Dover, Kent County, Delaware. The house is in two sections; one of brick and one frame. The original section dates from 1742 and is a 2 1/2-story, brick, nearly square five bay structure in a First Period English(late-Medieval) / early-Georgian style. Attached is a substantial later frame addition. It fronts directly on the sidewalk with no front dooryard, but has a large and very handsome garden behind the main house and on its south side.

It was added to the National Register of Historic Places in 1972. It is located in the Dover Green Historic District.
