= Old State House (Dover, Delaware) =

- Old Statehouse
- U.S. National Register of Historic Places
- U.S. Historic district – Contributing property
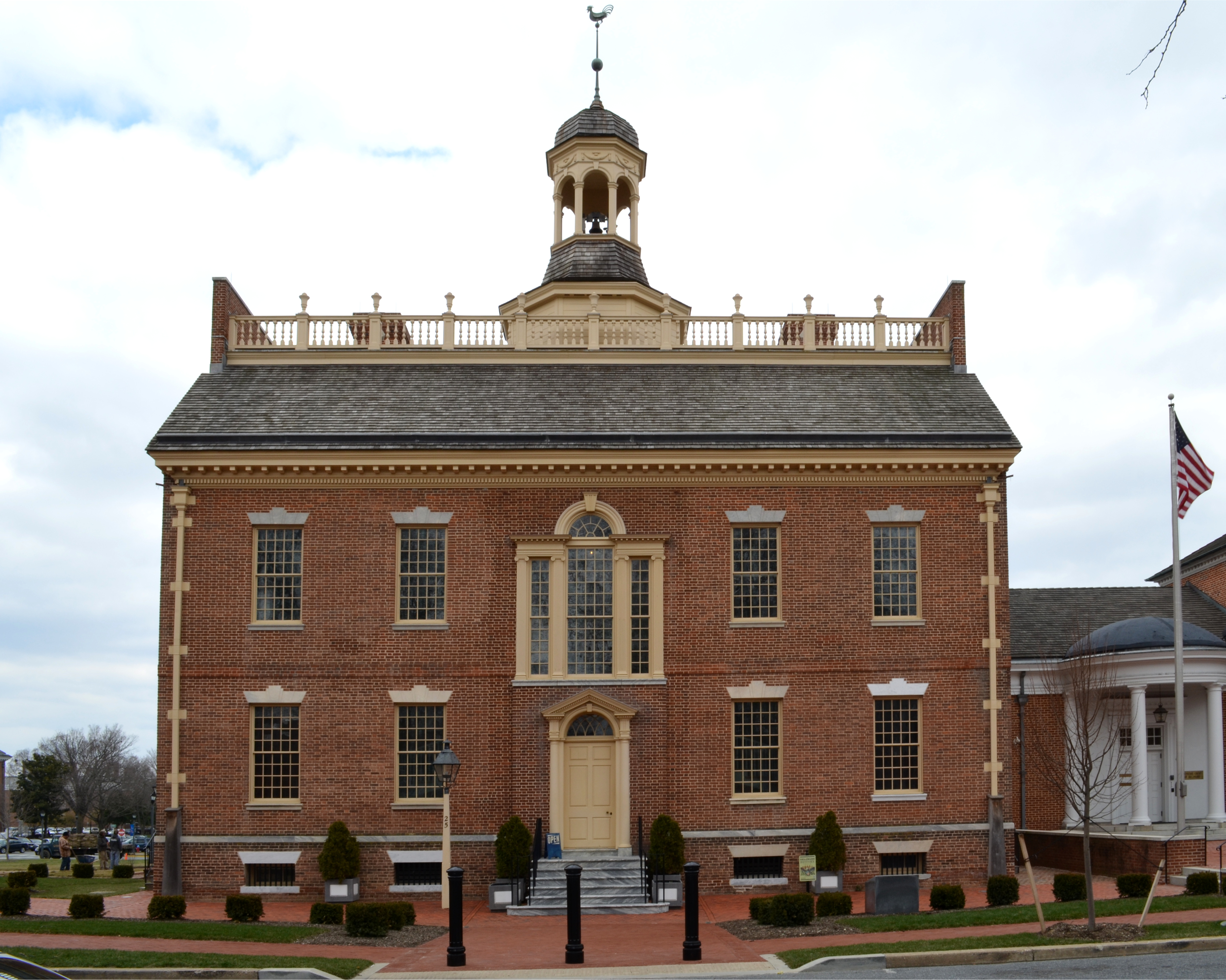
- Old State House, March 2013

- Location within Delaware Location within the United States
- Location: The Green, Dover, Delaware
- Coordinates: 39°9′23″N 75°31′23″W
- Area: 0.1 acres (0.040 ha)
- Built: 1787–1792
- Architectural style: Georgian
- Part of: Dover Green Historic District (ID77000383)
- NRHP reference No.: 71000219
- Added to NRHP: February 24, 1971

Old Statehouse is a historic state capitol building located on The Green at Dover, Kent County, Delaware. It was built between 1787 and 1792, and is a two-story, five-bay, brick structure in a Middle Georgian style. The front facade features a fanlight over the center door and above it a Palladian window at the center of the second floor. It has a shingled side gabled roof topped with an octagonal cupola. A number of attached wings were added between 1836 and 1926. From 1792 to 1932 it was the sole seat of State government, while from 1792 until 1873 it served also as Kent County Court House.

The state house was remodeled in 1873 to reflect a Victorian style and restored in 1976 to its original appearance. Extensive renovations of the State House also took place in 2007.

It was added to the National Register of Historic Places in 1971. It is located in the Dover Green Historic District. It is now part of the Delaware National Historic Park and a museum run by the Delaware Division of Historic and Cultural Affairs. It can be toured Monday–Saturday 9–4:30 and Sundays 1:30–4:30 free of charge.

== Gallery ==
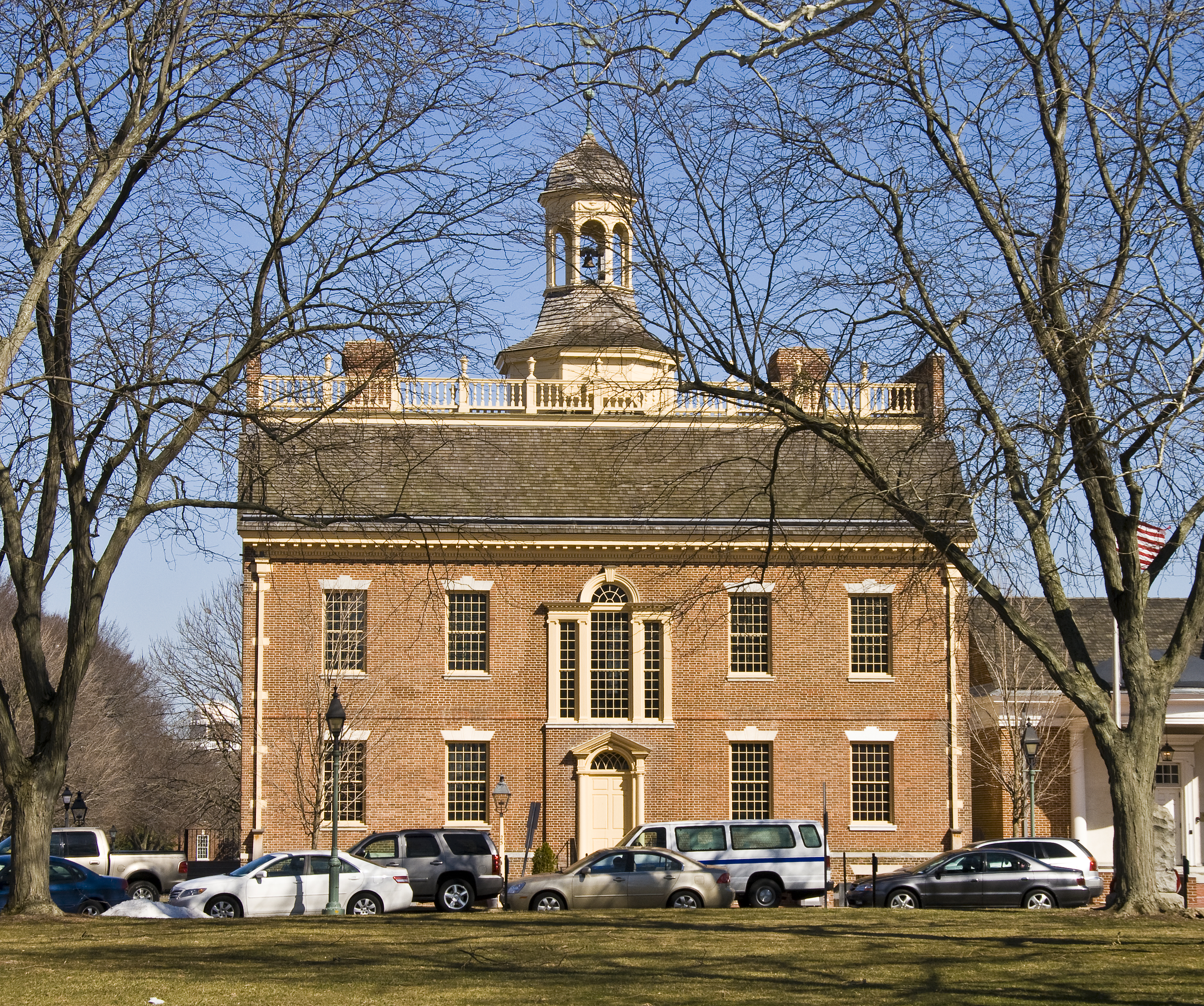
The building's exterior in 2010

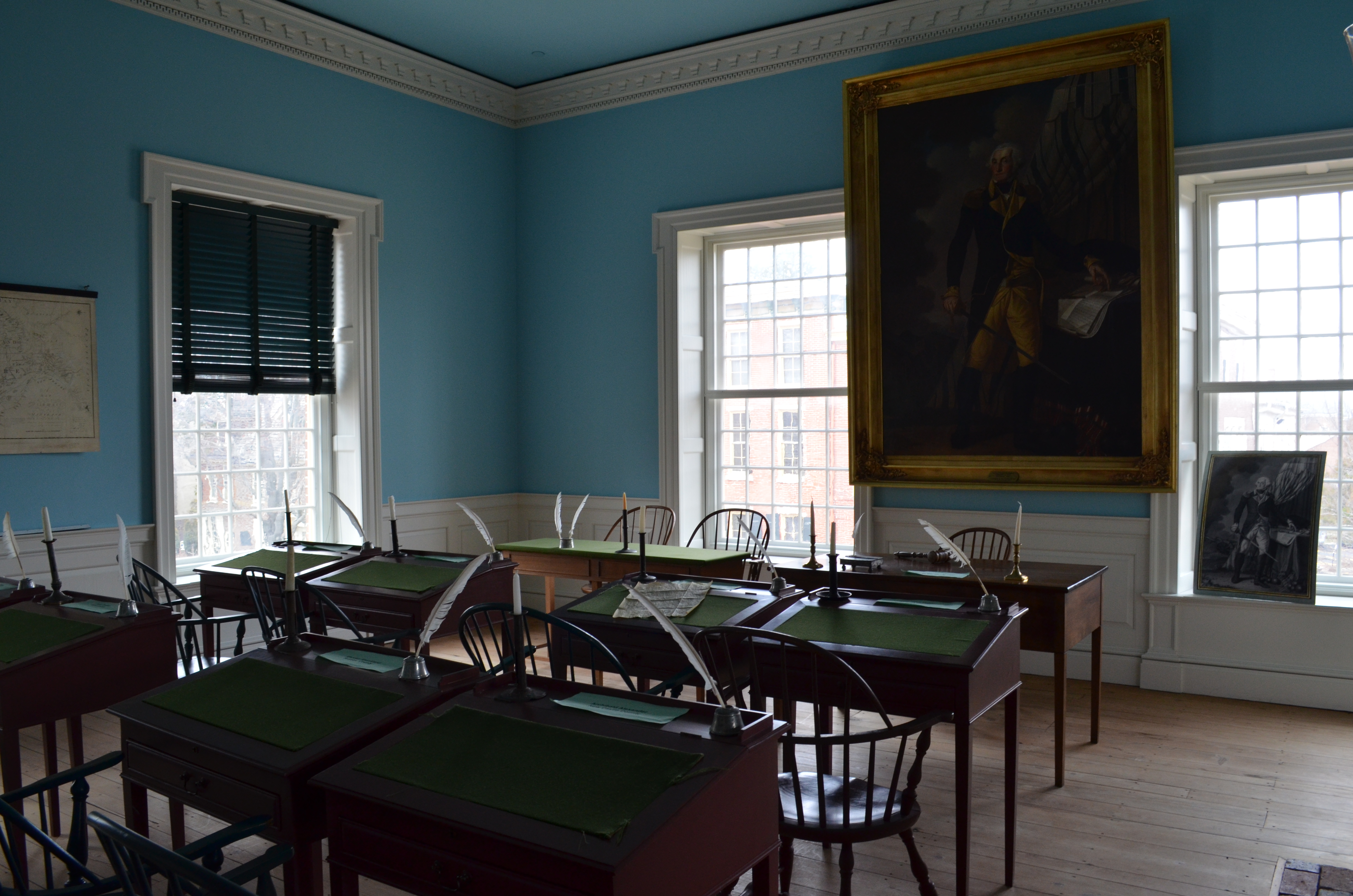
Old State Senate chamber

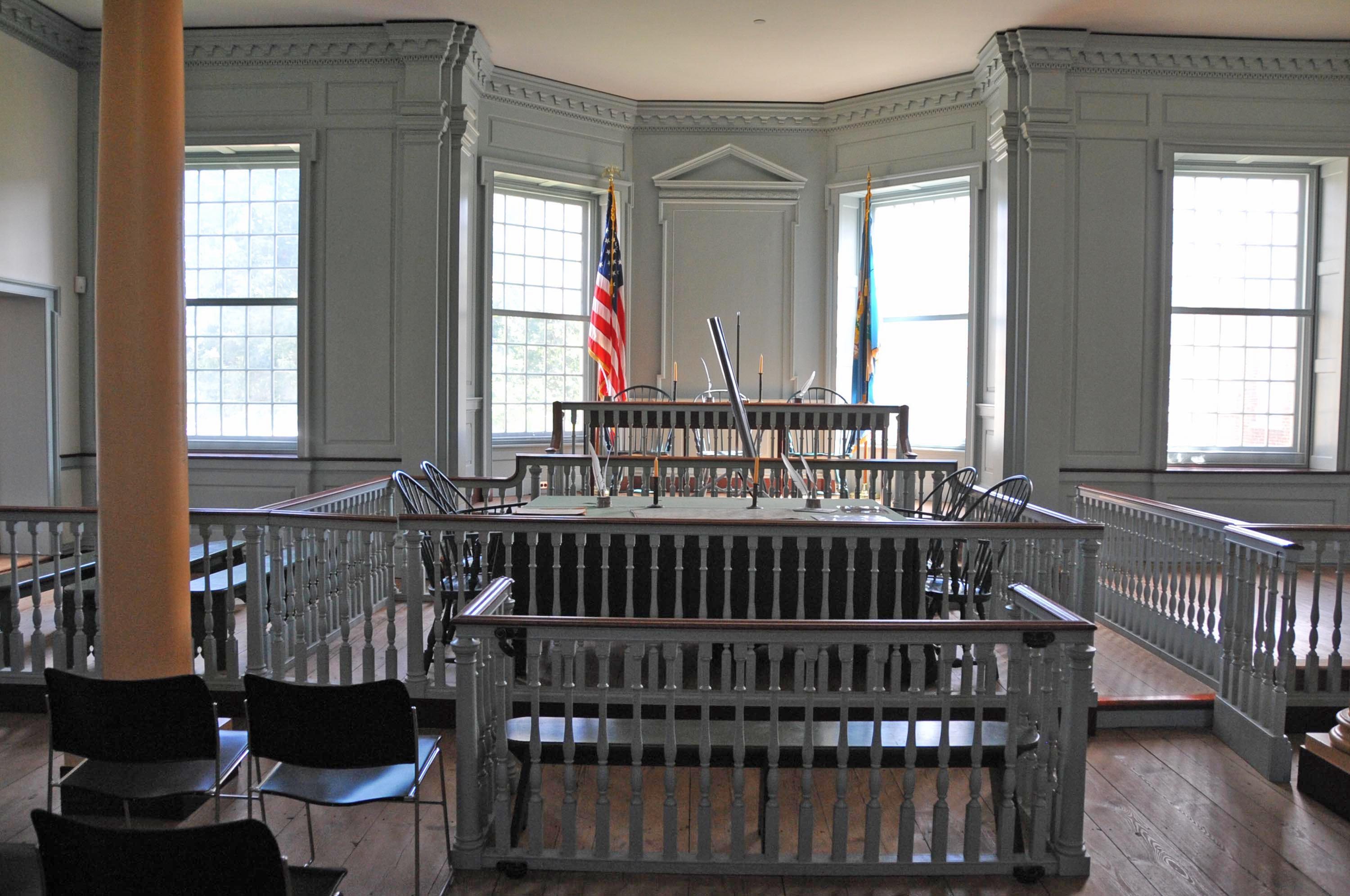
Original courtroom

== Description ==
The Old State House is an elegant brick building constructed in the late Middle Georgian style. It boasts five bays and is laid in Flemish bond at the front and Liverpool bond on the sides, both displaying excellent craftsmanship. The windows are topped with marble lintels, while the water table is also adorned with marble. A fanlight can be seen above the door, and at the center of the second-floor fenestration is a beautiful Palladian window. The building is crowned with a shingled-hipped roof and an octagonal cupola. The State House underwent a complete reconstruction between 1787 and 1792, incorporating the hard brick and other reusable materials from its predecessor, a courthouse built in 1722.

Except for unfortunate changes in 1873-1875, which substituted a mansard roof and bricked in most of the Palladian window, exterior alterations to the State House have been in the form of attached wings, added between 1836 and 1926. In 1910 the original roof line and five second-floor windows were restored to their pre-1873 appearance. The enlargements are a brick two-story and basement addition to the east, built in 1836 and extended in 1895-1897; a pillared rotunda and south wing in 1910; and an annex to the east in 1925-1926. In 1968-1969 the rotunda was removed, leaving an inconspicuous single-story recessed structure between the original Old State House and the remodeled former south wing, now a separate Supreme Court Building.

The interior of both the oldest section and the successive additions has been repeatedly altered to meet changing needs. Research to determine the nature and dates of these changes is far advanced. Restoration of the original 1787-1792 State House is scheduled for the near future.

The State House stands on The Green, centrally located in the Colonial portion of Dover. It faces west, occupying, the Supreme Court Building, all the east side of the small eighteenth-century square. The State House shares The Green with Kent County Courthouse, private homes, several of them handsome, and former private homes converted to State or professional office use. A four-lane street, widened for extra parking in front of the State House, separates the tree-shaded grass plot from the buildings, nearly all of which open directly on the sidewalk. Many are of eighteenth-century date, some with Victorian facades. State Street, a portion of U.S. Alternate 113, bisects The Green parallel with the front of the State House.

To the east of The Green, adjacent to the newer rear additions to the State House, is a large open space laid out circa 1930. About it are centered additional small and medium sized State buildings erected in and after 1932 but of Georgian design to harmonize with the original structure. Together with the public buildings fronting on The Green, they comprise a Capitol Buildings Complex.

== Significance ==
The Capitol Buildings Complex in Delaware comprises several important units, but none are as architecturally and historically significant as the Old State House. Since 1777, this building and its surrounding area have been directly or indirectly linked to almost all legislative and executive decisions of the state. It served as the sole seat of the state government from 1792 to 1932 and also functioned as Kent County Courthouse from 1722 to 1873. The Declaration of Independence was read here in July 1776, and King George's portrait was ceremonially burned. Delaware ratified the Federal Constitution on December 7, 1787, making it the First State, at or near the same site. On January 3, 1861, the General Assembly of this northernmost slave state expressed its "unqualified disapproval" of secession within the Old State House. Throughout Delaware's history, other noteworthy events have occurred in or near the Old State House, demonstrating its significance.

== See also ==
- 18th-century Western domes
