= Mifflin-Marim Agricultural Complex =

- U.S. National Register of Historic Places
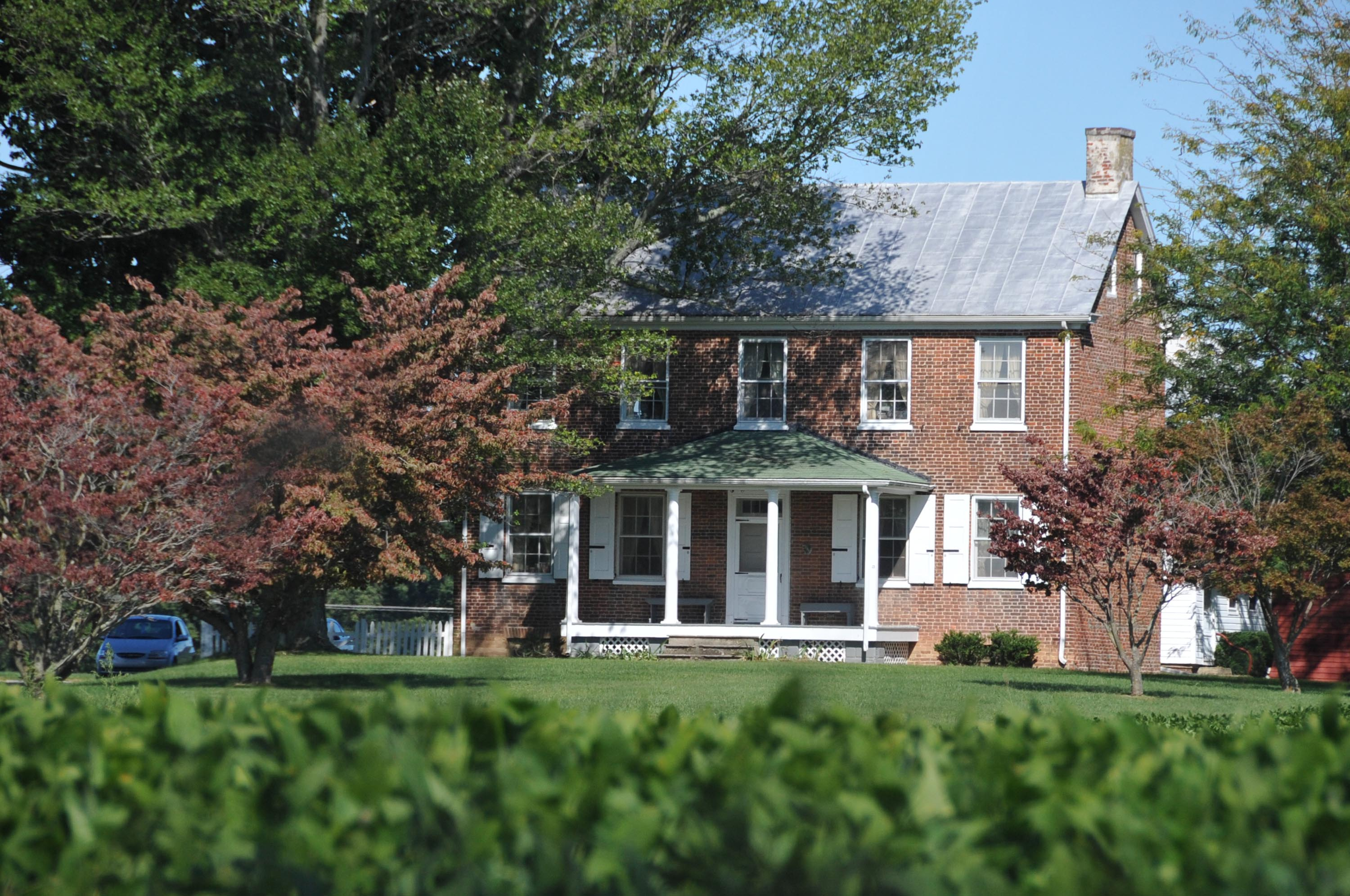

- Location within Delaware Location within the United States
- Location: Delaware Route 9, Dover, Delaware
- Coordinates: 39°12′40″N 75°30′6″W
- Area: 5 acres (2.0 ha)
- Built: 1820
- NRHP reference No.: 84000269
- Added to NRHP: November 7, 1984

Mifflin-Marim Agricultural Complex is a historic home located at Dover, Kent County, Delaware. The complex consists of four contributing buildings and two contributing structures. The main house dates to about 1820, and is a two-story, five-bay, center hall plan brick dwelling. The L-shaped dwelling has a low two-story rear wing. The house and its associated agricultural outbuildings are reflective of 18th-century building techniques. They are a barn, stable, frame corn crib and granary on brick piers and a series of small sheds and utility buildings.

It was added to the National Register of Historic Places in 1984.
