= Christ Church (Dover, Delaware) =

Historic church in Delaware, United States

- U.S. National Register of Historic Places
- U.S. Historic district – Contributing property
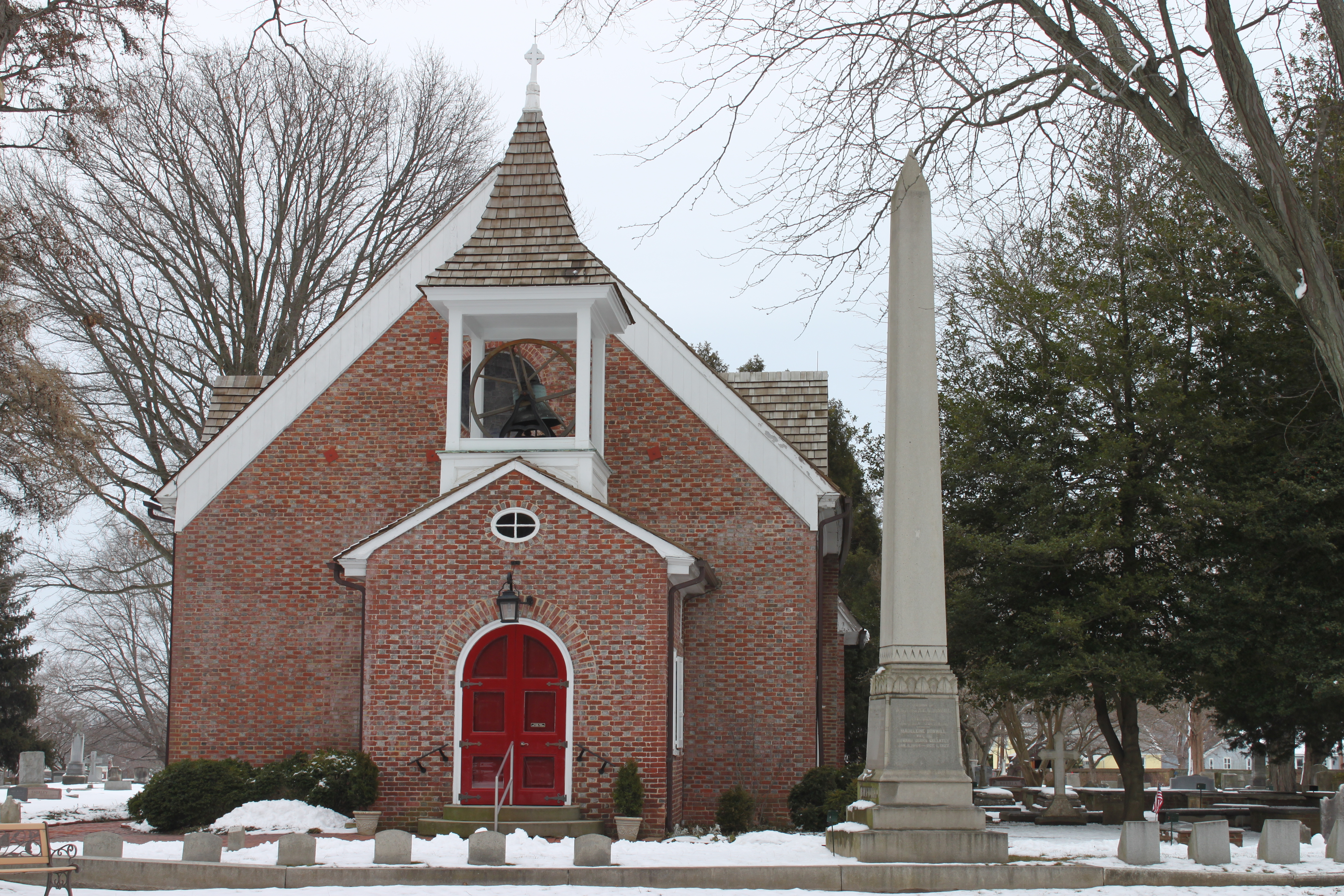
- Christ Church, January 2011

- Location within Delaware Location within the United States
- Location: S. State and Water Sts., Dover, Delaware
- Coordinates: 39°9′16″N 75°31′20″W
- Area: 1 acre (0.40 ha)
- Built: 1734
- NRHP reference No.: 72001500
- Added to NRHP: December 04, 1972

Christ Church is a historic Episcopal church and cemetery located at S. State and Water Streets at Dover, Kent County, Delaware. It is located on one of two public squares set aside for houses of worship in the Dover town plan of 1717.

The church reported 414 members in 2017 and 159 members in 2023; no membership statistics were reported in 2024 parochial reports. Plate and pledge income reported for the congregation in 2024 was $303,245 with average Sunday attendance (ASA) of 79 persons. This was a relative decrease from ASA of 155 reported in 2019.

The church was established as a mission church of the Society for the Propagation of the Gospel in 1704 and the building constructed in 1734. It was remodeled in 1859 and 1887. It is a brick structure composed of the original rectangular nave, surrounded by brick appendages. Adjacent to the church is the cemetery, with a number of notable burials. The cemetery includes a cenotaph to a signer of the Declaration of Independence Caesar Rodney; the actual location of Rodney's remains is unknown.

The church was added to the National Register of Historic Places in 1972. It is located in the Dover Green Historic District.

It is part of the Episcopal Diocese of Delaware, which encompasses the entire state and whose current bishop is the Right Reverend Kevin Brown.
