= Dover, Delaware =

Dover
- State capital
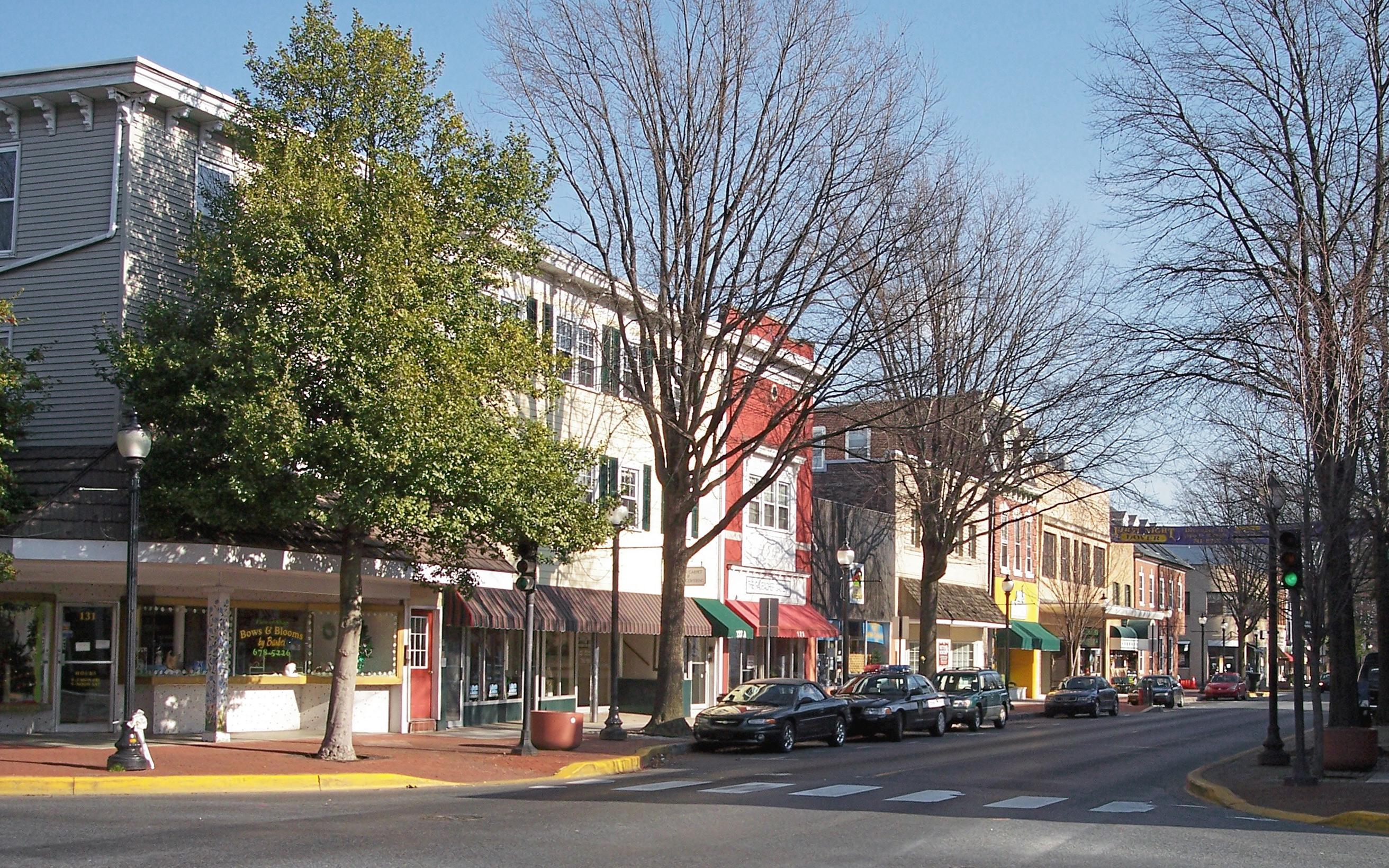
- View of Loockerman Street in downtown Dover

- Flag Seal
- Etymology: Dover, Kent, England
- Nickname: Capital of the First State
- Location in Kent County & the state of Delaware

- Location in the United States
- Coordinates: 39°09′29″N 75°31′28″W
- Country: United States
- State: Delaware
- County: Kent
- Founded: 1683
- Incorporated: 1717

Government
  - Type: Council-manager
  - Mayor: Robin Christiansen (D)

Area
  - State capital: 23.97 sq mi (62.09 km^{2})
  - Land: 23.67 sq mi (61.30 km^{2})
  - Water: 0.31 sq mi (0.79 km^{2})
- Elevation: 30 ft (9.1 m)

Population (2020)
  - State capital: 40,191
  - Estimate (2024): 40,191
  - Density: 1,664.8/sq mi (642.79/km^{2})
  - Metro: 152,255
- Time zone: UTC−05:00 (EST)
  - Summer (DST): UTC−04:00 (EDT)
- ZIP Codes: 19901–19906
- Area code: 302
- FIPS code: 10-21200
- GNIS feature ID: 217882
- Website: cityofdover.gov

Dover (/ˈdoʊvər/ DOH-vər) is the capital and the second-most populous city of the U.S. state of Delaware, after Wilmington. It is also the county seat of Kent County and the principal city of the Dover metropolitan statistical area, which encompasses all of Kent County and is part of the Philadelphia metropolitan area. It is located on the St. Jones River in the Delaware River coastal plain. It was named by William Penn for Dover in Kent, England (for which Kent County is named). As of 2024, its population was estimated as 40,191.

== Etymology ==
The city is named after Dover, in Kent, England. First recorded in its Latinised form of Portus Dubris, the name derives from the Brythonic word for waters (dwfr in Middle Welsh). The same element is present in the town's French (Douvres) and Modern Welsh (Dofr) forms.

== History ==
Dover was founded as the court town for newly established Kent County in 1683 by William Penn, the proprietor of the territory generally known as the "Lower Counties on the Delaware." Later, in 1717, the city was officially laid out by a special commission of the Delaware General Assembly. The capital of the state of Delaware was moved here from New Castle in 1777 because of its central location and relative safety from British raiders on the Delaware River. Because of an act passed in October 1779, the assembly elected to meet at any place in the state they saw fit, meeting successively in Wilmington, Lewes, Dover, New Castle, and Lewes again, until it finally settled down permanently in Dover in October 1781. The city's central square, known as The Green, was the location of many rallies, troop reviews, and other patriotic events. To this day, The Green remains the heart of Dover's historic district and is the location of the Delaware Supreme Court and the Kent County Courthouse.

Dover was most famously the home of Caesar Rodney, the popular wartime leader of Delaware during the American Revolution. He is known to have been buried outside Dover, but the precise location of his grave is unknown. A cenotaph in his honor is erected in the cemetery of the Christ Episcopal Church near The Green in Dover.

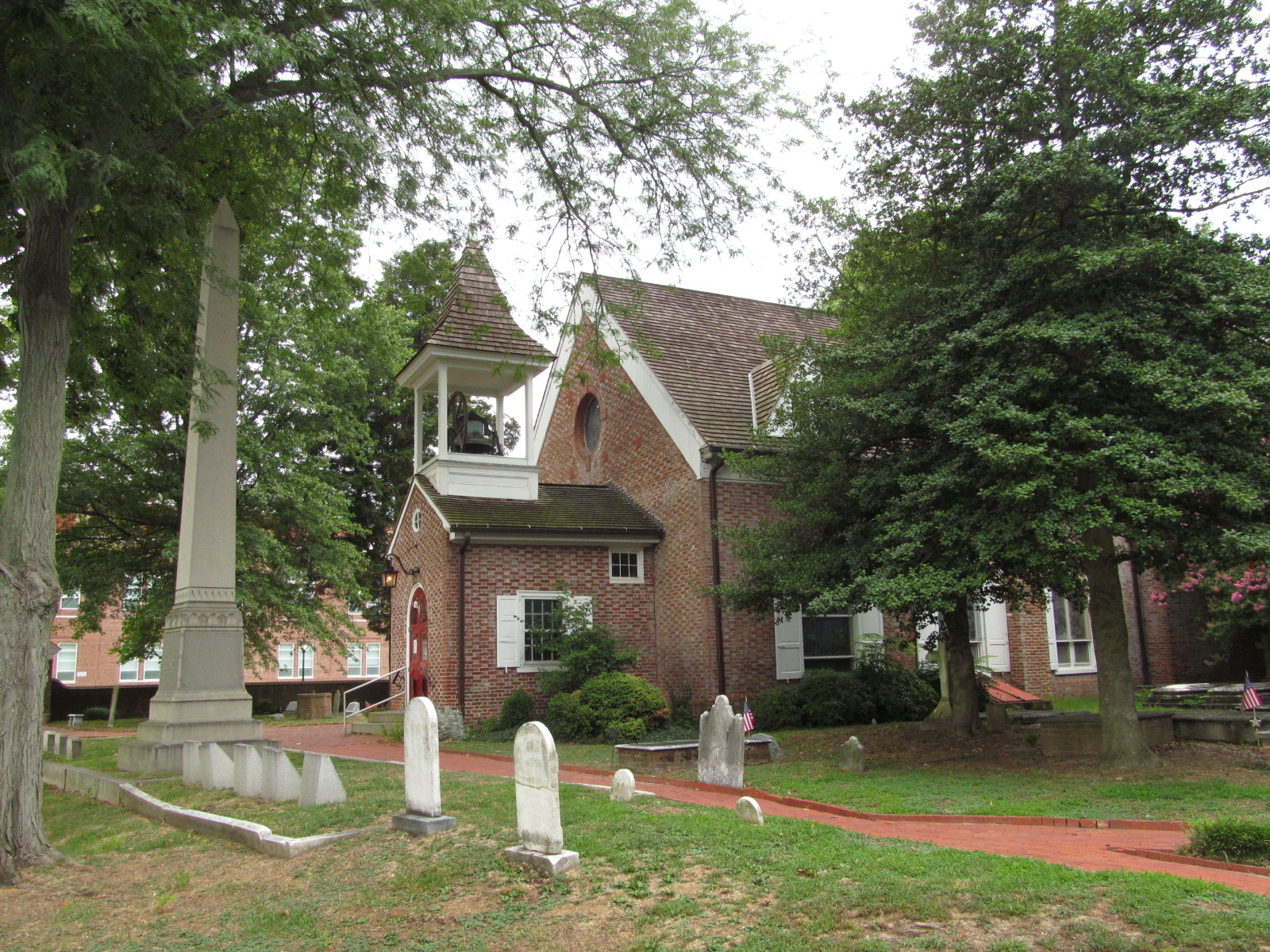
Christ Church entrance and bell tower in Dover

Dover and Kent County were deeply divided over the issue of slavery, and the city was a "stop" on the Underground Railroad because of its proximity to slave-holding Maryland and free Pennsylvania and New Jersey. It was also home to a large Quaker community that encouraged a sustained emancipation effort in the early 19th century. There were very few slaves in the area, but the institution was supported, if not practiced, by a small majority, who saw to its continuation.

The Bradford-Loockerman House, Building 1301, Dover Air Force Base, John Bullen House, Carey Farm Site, Christ Church, Delaware State Museum Buildings, John Dickinson House, Dover Green Historic District, Eden Hill, Delaware Governor's Mansion, Greenwold, Hughes-Willis Site, Loockerman Hall, Macomb Farm, Mifflin-Marim Agricultural Complex, Old Statehouse, Palmer Home, Town Point, Tyn Head Court, and Victorian Dover Historic District are listed on the National Register of Historic Places.

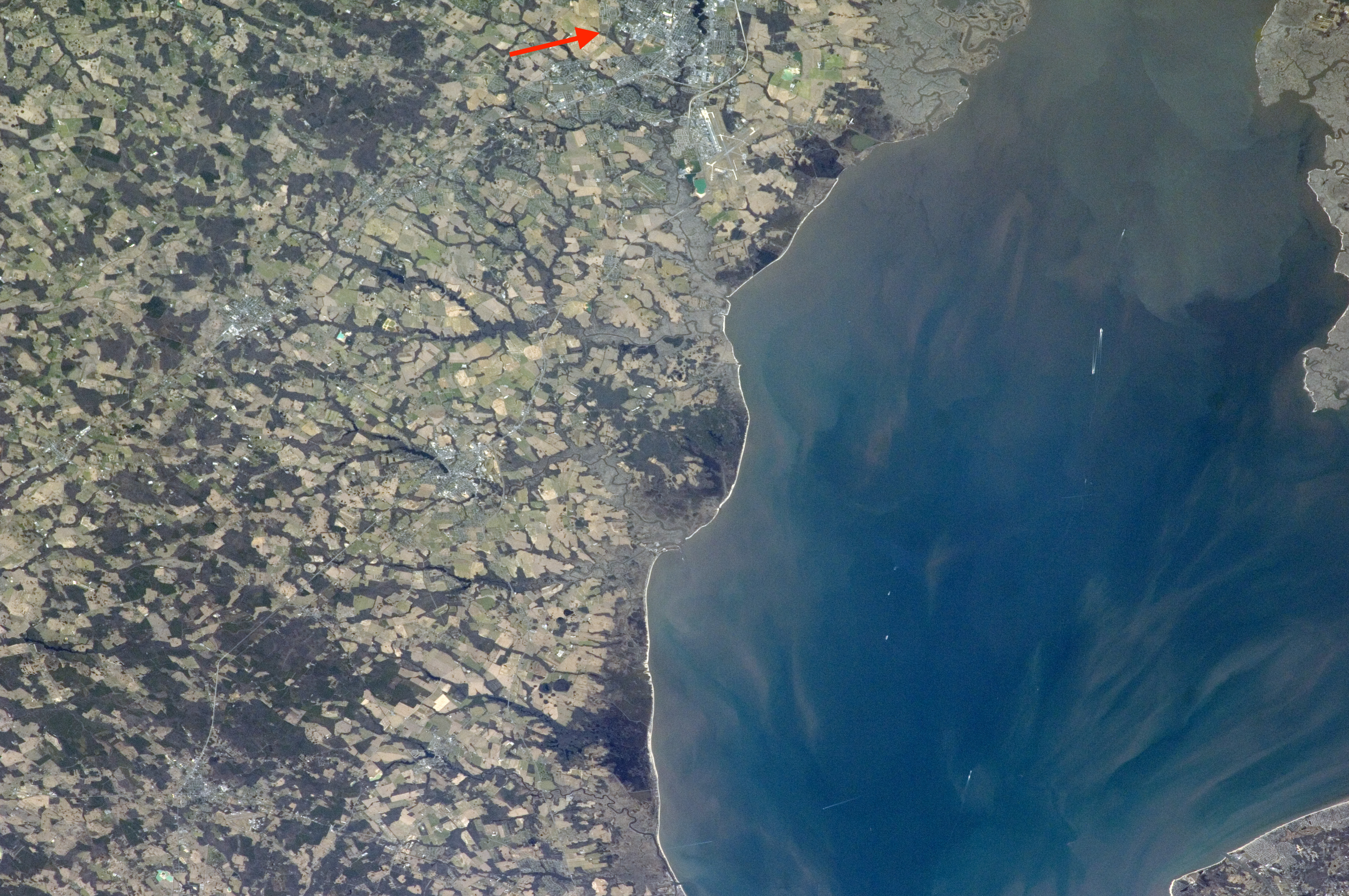
Satellite photo of Dover taken from the International Space Station. The red arrow points at Dover.

On August 4, 2020, Hurricane Isaias produced an EF2 tornado that struck the city. Trees were significantly damaged, including some that fell on homes, roofing was blown off a middle school, a warehouse had metal walls torn off, some tractor trailers were blown over and a garage was severely damaged. Damage in Dover was rated EF1. The tornado was on the ground for tracked 35.78 miles (57.58 km), becoming the longest-tracked tornado in the state, but there were no casualties.

== Geography ==
According to the United States Census Bureau, the city has a total area of 22.7 square miles (59 km^{2}), of which 22.4 square miles (58 km^{2}) is land and 0.3 square miles (0.78 km^{2}), or 1.32%, is water.

=== Climate ===
Climate chart for Dover

Dover has a warm temperate climate or humid subtropical climate (Köppen Cfa). Summers are hot and humid, with 25 days per year reaching or surpassing 90 °F (32 °C). Brief, but heavy summer thunderstorms are common. Winters are moderated by the Delaware Bay and the partial shielding of the Appalachians, though there are normally 8−9 days when the daily high remains below freezing and 15 nights with lows below 20 °F (−7 °C). Snow is typically light and sporadic, averaging only 13.2 inches (34 cm) per year, and does not usually remain on the ground for long. The hardiness zone is 7b. Spring and autumn provide transitions of reasonable length and are similar, though spring is wetter. The monthly mean temperature ranges from 36.0 °F (2.2 °C) in January to 77.9 °F (25.5 °C) in July. The annual total precipitation of around 47.61 inches (1,209.3 mm) is spread rather evenly year-round.

Climate data for Dover, Delaware (1991−2020 normals, extremes 1893–present)
Month	Jan	Feb	Mar	Apr	May	Jun	Jul	Aug	Sep	Oct	Nov	Dec	Year
Record high °F (°C)	77 (25)	80 (27)	88 (31)	97 (36)	98 (37)	101 (38)	104 (40)	102 (39)	99 (37)	95 (35)	85 (29)	75 (24)	104 (40)
Mean maximum °F (°C)	65.7 (18.7)	65.4 (18.6)	73.5 (23.1)	83.0 (28.3)	88.1 (31.2)	93.1 (33.9)	95.4 (35.2)	93.1 (33.9)	89.0 (31.7)	82.8 (28.2)	73.9 (23.3)	66.1 (18.9)	96.1 (35.6)
Mean daily maximum °F (°C)	44.4 (6.9)	47.4 (8.6)	54.5 (12.5)	66.0 (18.9)	74.4 (23.6)	82.7 (28.2)	86.9 (30.5)	85.1 (29.5)	79.2 (26.2)	68.9 (20.5)	58.0 (14.4)	48.6 (9.2)	66.3 (19.1)
Daily mean °F (°C)	36.0 (2.2)	38.2 (3.4)	45.0 (7.2)	55.5 (13.1)	64.4 (18.0)	73.2 (22.9)	77.9 (25.5)	76.2 (24.6)	70.1 (21.2)	59.2 (15.1)	48.7 (9.3)	40.3 (4.6)	57.1 (13.9)
Mean daily minimum °F (°C)	27.6 (−2.4)	29.0 (−1.7)	35.4 (1.9)	44.9 (7.2)	54.4 (12.4)	63.8 (17.7)	69.0 (20.6)	67.3 (19.6)	61.0 (16.1)	49.5 (9.7)	39.3 (4.1)	32.1 (0.1)	47.8 (8.8)
Mean minimum °F (°C)	10.8 (−11.8)	13.3 (−10.4)	20.5 (−6.4)	31.1 (−0.5)	40.7 (4.8)	51.0 (10.6)	59.5 (15.3)	58.4 (14.7)	47.7 (8.7)	34.4 (1.3)	24.0 (−4.4)	17.8 (−7.9)	8.8 (−12.9)
Record low °F (°C)	−7 (−22)	−11 (−24)	7 (−14)	14 (−10)	28 (−2)	41 (5)	45 (7)	35 (2)	30 (−1)	25 (−4)	11 (−12)	−3 (−19)	−11 (−24)
Average precipitation inches (mm)	3.43 (87)	3.08 (78)	4.21 (107)	3.72 (94)	3.89 (99)	4.56 (116)	4.14 (105)	4.92 (125)	4.25 (108)	4.06 (103)	3.36 (85)	3.99 (101)	47.61 (1,209)
Average snowfall inches (cm)	4.1 (10)	5.9 (15)	0.6 (1.5)	0.0 (0.0)	0.0 (0.0)	0.0 (0.0)	0.0 (0.0)	0.0 (0.0)	0.0 (0.0)	0.0 (0.0)	0.0 (0.0)	2.6 (6.6)	13.2 (34)
Average precipitation days (≥ 0.01 in)	9.7	9.2	9.8	10.3	10.5	9.2	9.0	8.2	8.2	8.0	7.4	10.2	109.7
Average snowy days (≥ 0.1 in)	1.8	1.9	0.4	0.0	0.0	0.0	0.0	0.0	0.0	0.0	0.0	0.8	4.9
Average ultraviolet index	2	3	5	6	8	9	9	8	7	4	2	2	5
Source 1: NOAA
Source 2: Weather Atlas (UV)

== Demographics ==
Historical population
Census	Pop.	Note	%±
1870	1,906		—
1880	2,811		47.5%
1890	3,061		8.9%
1900	3,329		8.8%
1910	3,720		11.7%
1920	4,042		8.7%
1930	4,800		18.8%
1940	5,517		14.9%
1950	6,223		12.8%
1960	7,250		16.5%
1970	17,488		141.2%
1980	23,507		34.4%
1990	27,630		17.5%
2000	32,135		16.3%
2010	36,047		12.2%
2020	39,403		9.3%
U.S. Decennial Census

=== Racial and ethnic composition ===
Dover city, Delaware – Racial and ethnic composition Note: the US Census treats Hispanic/Latino as an ethnic category. This table excludes Latinos from the racial categories and assigns them to a separate category. Hispanics/Latinos may be of any race.
Race / Ethnicity (NH = Non-Hispanic)	Pop 2000	Pop 2010	Pop 2020	% 2000	% 2010	% 2020
White alone (NH)	17,123	16,443	15,070	53.28%	45.62%	38.25%
Black or African American alone (NH)	11,776	14,798	16,785	36.65%	41.05%	42.60%
Native American or Alaska Native alone (NH)	137	164	169	0.43%	0.45%	0.43%
Asian alone (NH)	1,001	975	1,289	3.11%	2.70%	3.27%
Native Hawaiian or Pacific Islander alone (NH)	11	16	31	0.03%	0.04%	0.08%
Other race alone (NH)	75	85	272	0.23%	0.24%	0.69%
Mixed race or Multiracial (NH)	685	1,204	2,511	2.13%	3.34%	6.37%
Hispanic or Latino (any race)	1,327	2,362	3,276	4.13%	6.55%	8.31%
Total	32,135	36,047	39,403	100.00%	100.00%	100.00%

=== 2020 census ===
As of the 2020 census, Dover had a population of 39,403. The median age was 32.8 years. 21.2% of residents were under the age of 18 and 16.5% of residents were 65 years of age or older. For every 100 females there were 87.3 males, and for every 100 females age 18 and over there were 83.7 males age 18 and over.

98.9% of residents lived in urban areas, while 1.1% lived in rural areas.

There were 15,155 households in Dover, of which 29.7% had children under the age of 18 living in them. Of all households, 31.6% were married-couple households, 20.2% were households with a male householder and no spouse or partner present, and 40.4% were households with a female householder and no spouse or partner present. About 34.1% of all households were made up of individuals and 13.9% had someone living alone who was 65 years of age or older.

There were 16,055 housing units, of which 5.6% were vacant. The homeowner vacancy rate was 1.7% and the rental vacancy rate was 4.3%.

Racial composition as of the 2020 census
Race	Number	Percent
White	15,617	39.6%
Black or African American	17,179	43.6%
American Indian and Alaska Native	218	0.6%
Asian	1,300	3.3%
Native Hawaiian and Other Pacific Islander	34	0.1%
Some other race	1,425	3.6%
Two or more races	3,630	9.2%

=== 2010 census ===
In 2010, Dover had a population of 36,047. The racial makeup of the city was 48.3% White, 42.2% African American, 2.7% Asian, 0.5% Native American, 0.1% Pacific Islander, 2.1% from other races, and 4.1% from two or more races; 6.6% of the population were Hispanic or Latino of any race.

=== 2000 census ===
During the census of 2000, there were 32,135 people, 12,340 households, and 7,502 families residing in the city. The population density was 1,435.0 inhabitants per square mile (554.1/km^{2}). There were 13,195 housing units at an average density of 589.2 per square mile (227.5/km^{2}).

As of 2000, 30.0% of households had children under the age of 18 living with them, 40.4% were married couples living together, 16.7% had a female householder with no husband present, and 39.2% were non-families. 31.4% of all households were made up of individuals, and 10.6% had someone living alone who was 65 years of age or older. The average household size was 2.35 and the average family size was 2.98. In the city of Dover the age distribution of the population shows 23.5% under the age of 18, 15.7% from 18 to 24, 27.9% from 25 to 44, 19.5% from 45 to 64, and 13.3% who were 65 years of age or older. The median age was 33 years. For every 100 females, there were 88.9 males. For every 100 females age 18 and over, there were 85.1 males.

In 2000, the median income for a household in the city was $38,669, and the median income for a family was $48,338. Males had a median income of $34,824 versus $26,061 for females. The per capita income for the city was $19,445. About 11.5% of families and 13.8% of the population were below the poverty line, including 19.6% of those under age 18 and 10.4% of those age 65 or over.

=== American Community Survey estimates ===
In 2021, the median household income for a household in the city was $51,073 (~$60,682 in 2025) and 20.5% of the population lived at or below the poverty line.

== Economy ==
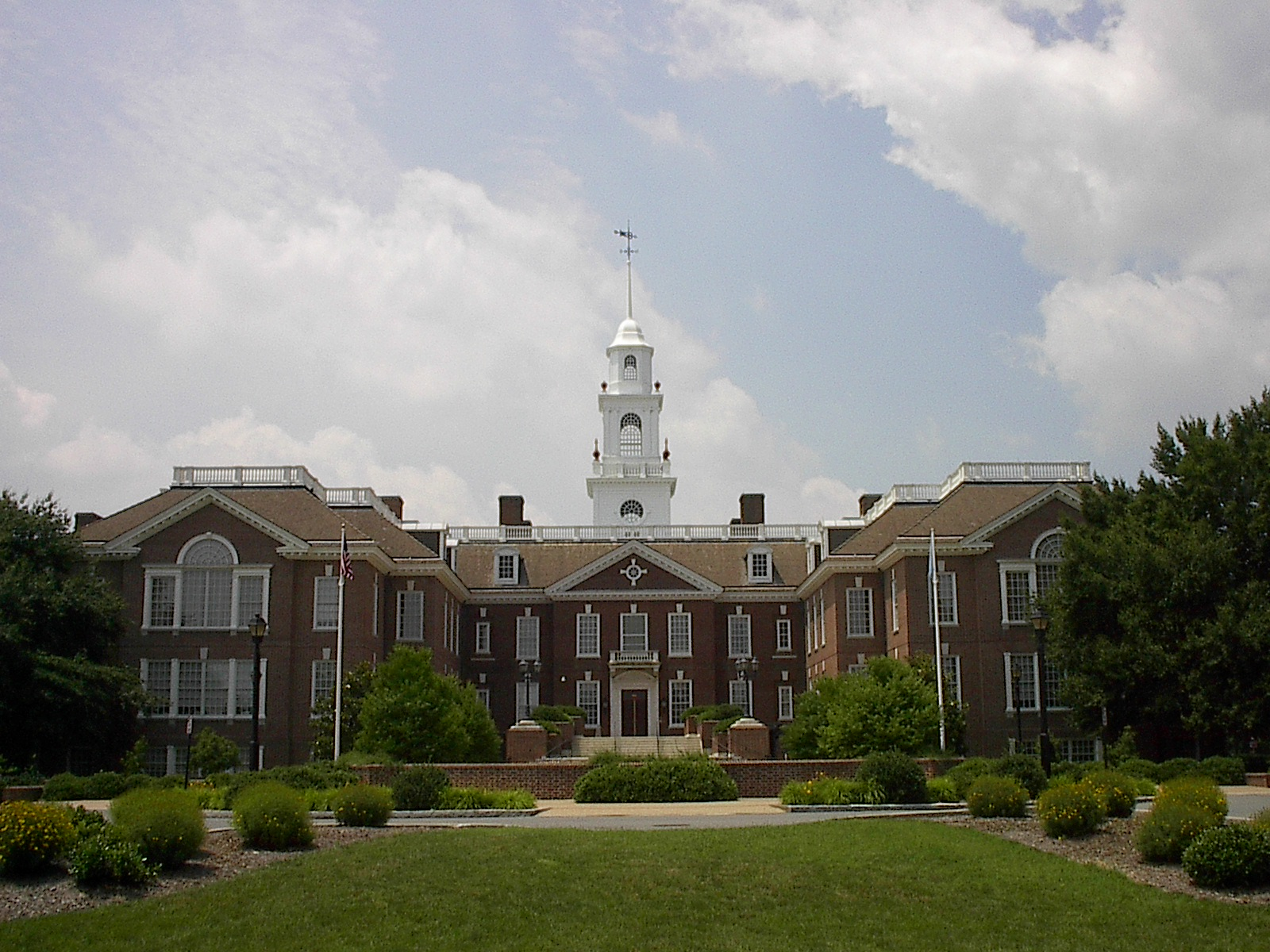
Legislative Hall

Delaware's largest employer is also Dover's: the state government. A large portion, but not all, of the state's bureaucracy is in and around Dover. Wilmington, in northern Delaware and the state's largest city, has many state offices and employees one might expect to find in the state capital, including the headquarters of the Office of the Attorney General, especially as many large American corporations maintain nominal offices in that city to register their Delaware corporation.

Dover is one of the fastest-growing areas in Delaware, due in large part to the relatively low cost of living. As a consequence, the Kent County government is a major employer in the area. Apart from the state and county governments, Dover's significant employers include Dover Air Force Base, in the southeast corporate limits of the city. The base houses two airlift wings as well as the U.S. military's only mortuary in the continental U.S., which accepts and processes the remains of soldiers killed in battle. In addition, Kraft Foods and Procter & Gamble have manufacturing facilities in Dover. Kraft Foods' Dover plant has been the plant that manufactures Jell-O since 1964, when it relocated from LeRoy, New York. The P&G plant makes Pampers Baby Fresh wipes. ILC Dover, in nearby Frederica, produces fabrics for military and aerospace uses and is the primary contractor for production of the Apollo and Skylab spacesuits, as well as the spacesuit assembly for the Space Shuttle's Extravehicular Mobility Unit (EMU). Several local and national retailers and restaurants line US 13 through Dover, with the Dover Mall situated along this corridor and serving as the area's only shopping mall.

One weekend a year in the spring, NASCAR races are held at Dover Motor Speedway, attracting about 65,000 spectators. Attendance at the races is much lower than in the 1990s and 2000s, when 140,000 spectators sometimes came. The races bring in increased patronage for local businesses, and hotels and motels sell out weeks in advance. Many race fans camp in RVs and tents adjacent to the track. These races, and in recent years adjacent slot machine gambling at Bally's Dover, contribute millions of dollars to Dover's economy.

Firefly Music Festival has been held in the Woodlands of Dover Motor Speedway every summer since 2012.

== Education ==
=== Colleges and universities ===
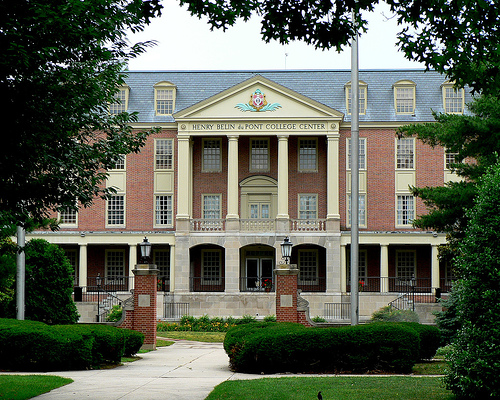
Wesley College, now the Delaware State University Downtown campus

Dover is home to Delaware State University, a land-grant university and Delaware's only historically black university. The city was also home to Wesley College, which is now the Delaware State University Downtown campus. Campus Community School, a public charter school, is located on the Wesley College grounds. It is also home to the Terry Campus of the Delaware Technical Community College and that college's administrative offices. Dover also has satellite locations of the University of Delaware and Wilmington University.

=== K-12 education ===
Three public school districts serve Dover residents. The majority of the city is served by the Capital School District, which includes Dover High School. The southern portion of Dover is served by the Caesar Rodney School District, which includes Caesar Rodney High School located just outside the city in Camden. The Polytech School District, which includes Polytech High School located in Woodside, serves as an overlay district for vocational-technical students.

The Dover Air Force Base Middle School is located on the premises of the Dover Air Force Base. This school is unusual in that it is run not by the Department of Defense Education Activity (DoDEA), but by the Caesar Rodney School District.

Dover Academy, which incorporated in 1810, was a private school. On April 14, 1919, the Delaware General Assembly created the Dover Special School District. The Delaware State Board of Education counted Dover's segregated school for black children as its own school district in minutes recorded during the 1919–1920 school year. The Dover special school district merged into the Capital School District on July 1, 1969.

== Culture ==
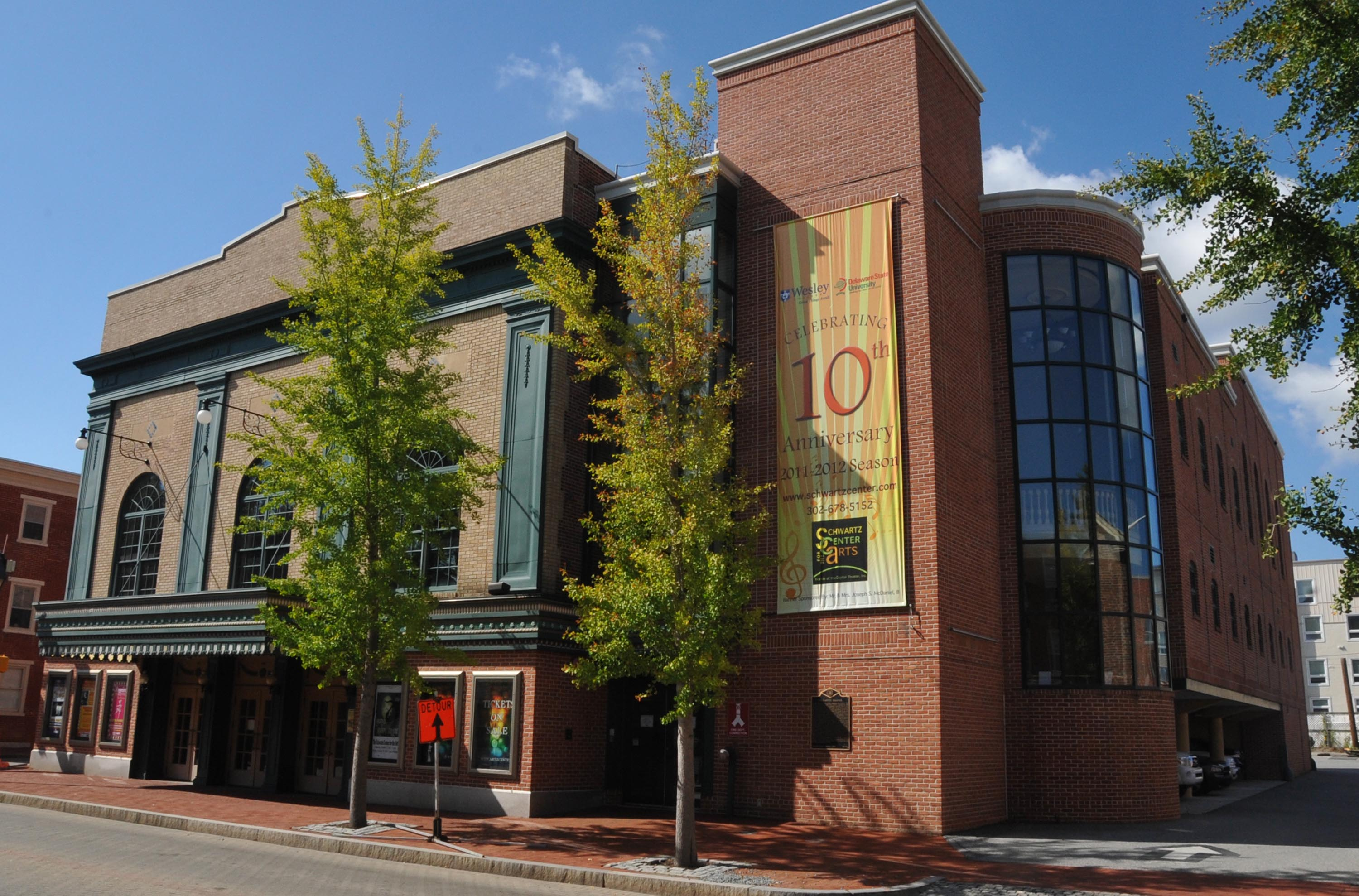
The Capitol Theater

The former Dover Opera House, built in 1904, was renovated and converted to the Schwartz Center for the Arts, which hosted performances by the Dover Symphony Orchestra, ballet, and classic films. The Schwartz Center for the Arts closed on June 30, 2017, due to financial issues.

The Kent County Theatre Guild was founded in 1953 and presents a five-show season at the organization's theater, the Patchwork Playhouse. It is run solely by volunteers, who handle everything from governance and building maintenance to set construction, acting and directing. It is open to anyone interested in participating in or learning about live theater.

Dover is also home to The Children's Theatre, Inc. of Dover and Kent County, a non-profit organization.

The Delaware State Library, the Delaware State Museum, and the Delaware State Archives are in downtown Dover and are open to the public for research and browsing.

In Dover's historical district is the Sewell C. Biggs Museum of American Art, featuring collections from the Colonial days to the present.

An Amish community resides to the west of Dover, consisting of 11 church districts and about 1,650 people. The Amish first settled in Kent County in 1915, with the settlement almost dying out in the '20s and '30s, but rebounding from the 60's to present. The area is home to several Amish businesses selling items such as Amish food, furniture, quilts, and handmade crafts. Every September, the Amish Country Bike Tour, the largest bike ride in Delaware, takes place in the area. In recent years, increasing development has led to the decline in the number of Amish living in the community, with some moving to areas with cheaper farmland and less traffic, such as Michigan, Upstate New York, Illinois, Kentucky, and southern Virginia.

== Parks and recreation ==
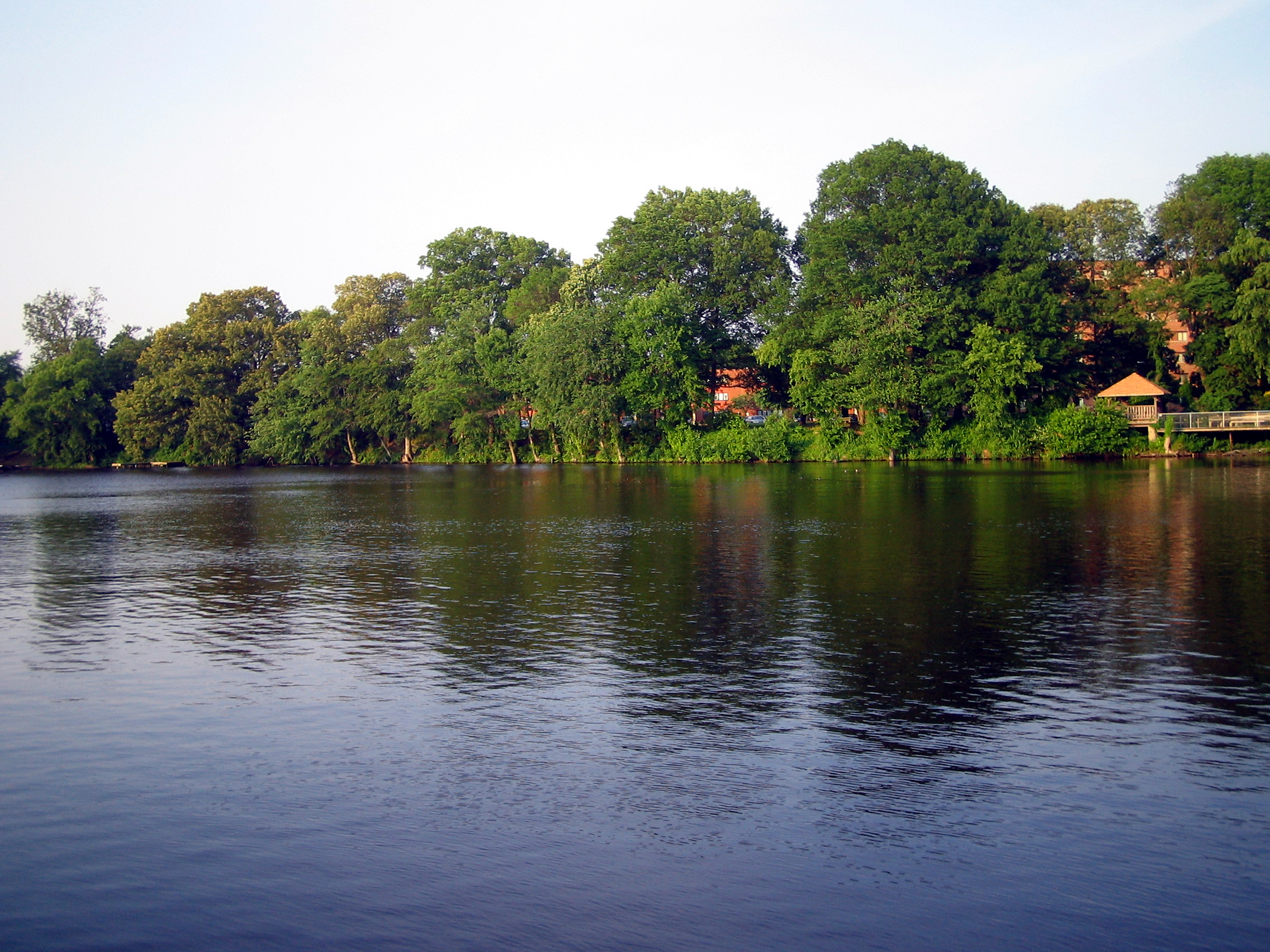
Silver Lake

The City of Dover Parks & Recreation Department maintains several parks in the city, consisting of three larger parks and 27 smaller parks. Silver Lake Park is a 182-acre park located along Silver Lake and offers fishing, boating, a walking/jogging path that provides views of the lake, a playground, benches, and pavilions. Schutte Park offers a variety of athletic facilities including 10 multipurpose fields, four lighted softball fields, a pavilion, a playground, a cross country course, waking paths, the Dover Little League baseball fields, and the John W. Pitts Recreation Center. The recreation center at Schutte Park has meeting rooms, a gym with two basketball courts and three volleyball courts, and an indoor walking track; it is home to a variety of fitness classes, sports, and sport leagues. Dover Park offers three tennis courts, a softball field, multipurpose field, two basketball courts, a disc golf course, and two pavilions. Dover is home to several smaller neighborhood parks including City Hall Plaza, Continental Park, Crossgates Park, Division & Kirkwood Streets Park, Kirkwood & Mary Streets Park, Hamlet, Heatherfield East, Mallard Pond, Mayfair Park, Millcreek Park, New & Dover Streets Park, Orville Myers, Paul's Property, Richardson Park, Saulsbury Park, The Green, Turner Drive, Westfield, Westwind Meadows, Williams Park, and Woodbrook.

== Media ==
Two newspapers are headquartered in Dover, the Dover Post, printed weekly and online, and the daily Delaware State News.

Kent County is within the Philadelphia television market, with the local Xfinity cable system carrying most channels from that city, alongside Salisbury stations WBOC-TV 16 (CBS), WMDT 47 (ABC), WCPB 28 (PBS), and low-powered NBC affiliate WRDE-LD 31. WBOC-TV maintains a bureau in Dover, and WHYY-TV 12, the PBS member station in Philadelphia, maintains a studio and broadcasting facility in Dover. WHYY programming is seen locally on WDPB-TV channel 64 from Seaford (part of the Salisbury television market).

WDDE, Delaware's first NPR station, launched in August 2012. It broadcasts on 91.1 FM. Delaware was the last state in the nation to have an NPR station located within its borders.

== Sports ==
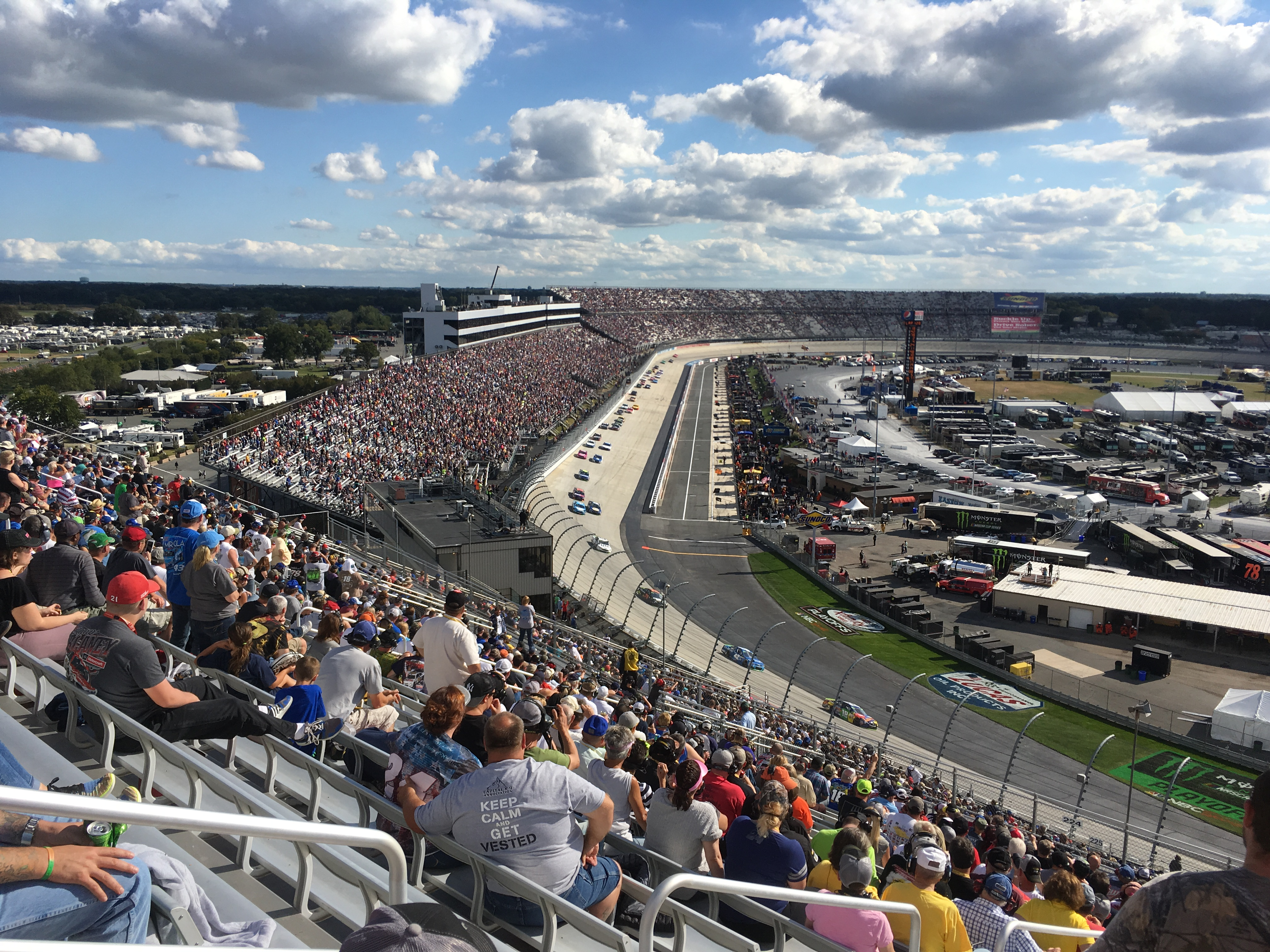
NASCAR racing at Dover Motor Speedway

Dover Motor Speedway is home to a NASCAR race weekend in May. The race weekend features the NASCAR Craftsman Truck Series on Friday, the NASCAR O'Reilly Auto Parts Series on Saturday, and the NASCAR Cup Series on Sunday. Located with DMS is Bally's Dover, a harness horse racing track, hotel and casino. The harness track is located within the NASCAR track.

The two colleges in town are both active in sports. The Wesley College Wolverines are a perennial powerhouse in NCAA Division III football, where they began play in the New Jersey Athletic Conference in 2015, while other sports compete in the Capital Athletic Conference. The Delaware State Hornets compete in NCAA Division I, with football competing at the FCS level of Division I, as a member of the Mid-Eastern Athletic Conference made up of other historically black colleges and universities.

For one week during the middle of July every year, Dover also hosts the Big League (Little League 16–18) Eastern Regionals, attracting teams from all of New England and the Mid-Atlantic.

There are several golf courses located near Dover. They include the Maple Dale Country Club in Dover, Wild Quail Country Club near Camden, Jonathan's Landing Golf Course near Magnolia, Dover Center Par 3 and Driving Range in Dover, and the Eagle Creek Golf Course (Must have military I.D.) on the Dover Air Force Base.

Historically, Dover hosted a farm team of the Philadelphia Phillies in the Eastern Shore Baseball League. It also served as an affiliate of the minor-league Baltimore Orioles. The teams were variously known as the Senators, Dobbins, Orioles, and Phillies.

In 2008, there was high attendance for the NASCAR races and Delaware State's football team making its first FCS tournament appearance.

Combat Zone Wrestling held its yearly Tournament of Death in Dover twice.

== Government ==
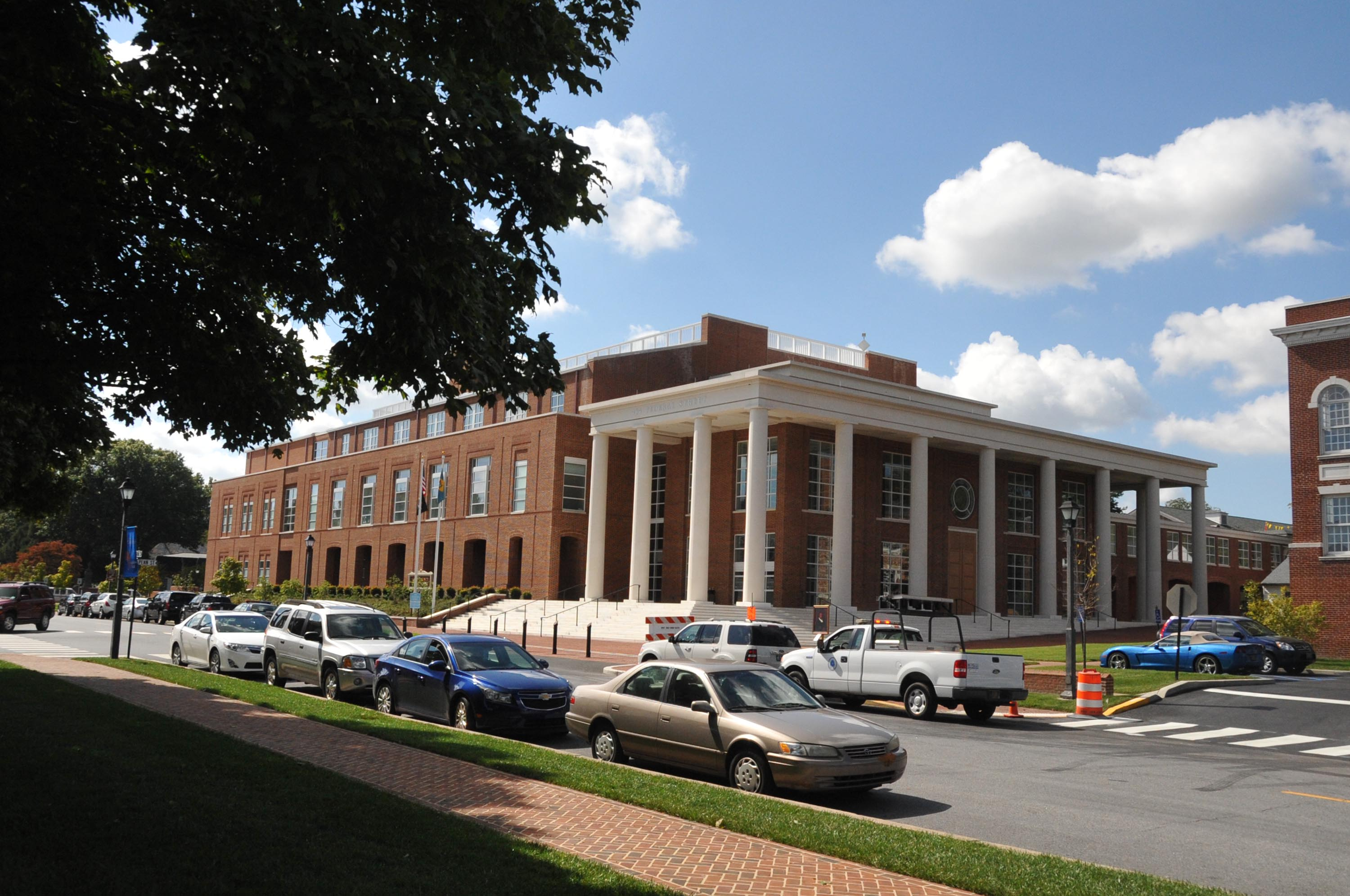
The new Kent County Courthouse

Dover is governed via the council-manager system with an elected mayor, currently Robin R. Christiansen since 2014. The council consists of nine members, eight of whom are elected from four districts with each district having two members. One member of the council is elected at large. Municipal elections, which are nonpartisan, are held on the third Tuesday in April in odd-numbered years. The mayor is elected directly by the city voters for a four-year term. City council members are elected to staggered four-year terms.

There have been four full-time Mayors of Dover to date: James "Hutch" Hutchison from 1994 to 2004; Stephen Speed from 2004 to 2007; Carleton Carey from 2007 to 2014; Robin R. Christiansen since 2014.

The Dover Police Department provides police services to the city of Dover. The police department is led by a Chief of Police, currently Thomas Johnson, and consists of 101 officers, responding to 43,000 calls a year. The Dover Police Department is composed of several sworn police units along with civilian units. Fire protection in Dover is provided by the Dover Fire Department, a volunteer fire department which has served the city since 1882 and operates two stations in Dover. Station 1 is the department's headquarters and houses Engines 4, 6, and 7; Ladder 2; Rescue 1; Brush 9; and Marine 1. The Dover Fire Department Museum is also located at the headquarters. Station 2 houses Engines 2 and 3; Ladder 1; Utility 1; and the foam trailer. Dover is the only state capital in the United States with a volunteer fire department.

Federally, Dover is part of Delaware's at-large congressional district, represented by Democrat Sarah McBride, elected in 2024. The state's senior member of the United States Senate is Democrat Chris Coons, first elected in 2010. The state's junior member of the United States Senate is Democrat Lisa Blunt Rochester, elected in 2024. The governor of Delaware is Democrat Matt Meyer, elected in 2024.

== Infrastructure ==
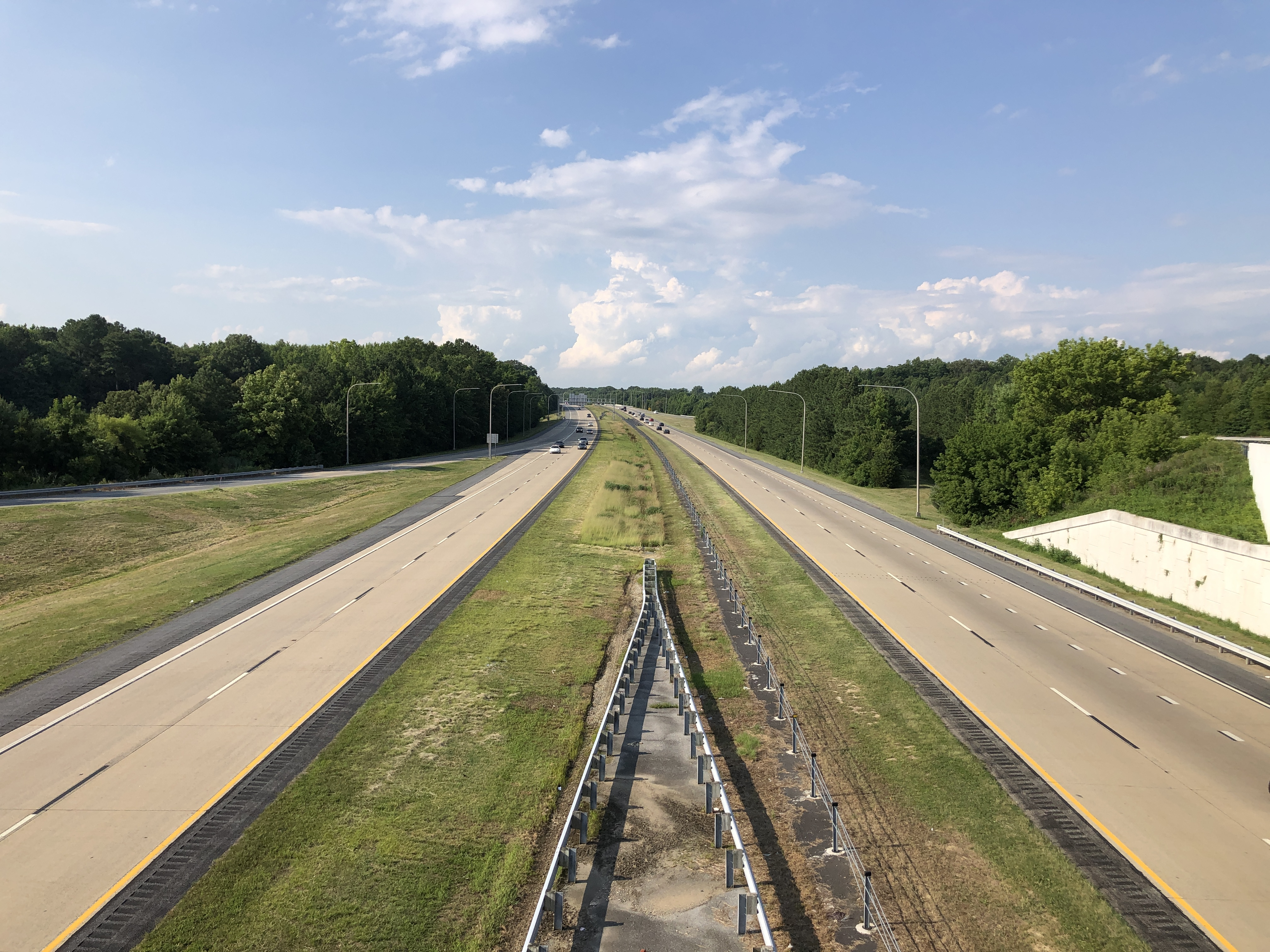
DE 1 northbound in Dover

=== Transportation ===
The most prominent highway serving Dover is the Delaware Route 1 toll road, which is the main route to Wilmington and the Delaware Beaches. It passes east of downtown, with the toll portion ending near the Dover Air Force Base and DE 1 continuing south on Bay Road. U.S. Route 113 formerly ran along Bay Road from Milford to US 13 near the State Capitol Complex, but was decommissioned north of Milford in 2004 to avoid the concurrency with DE 1 between the Dover Air Force Base and Milford.

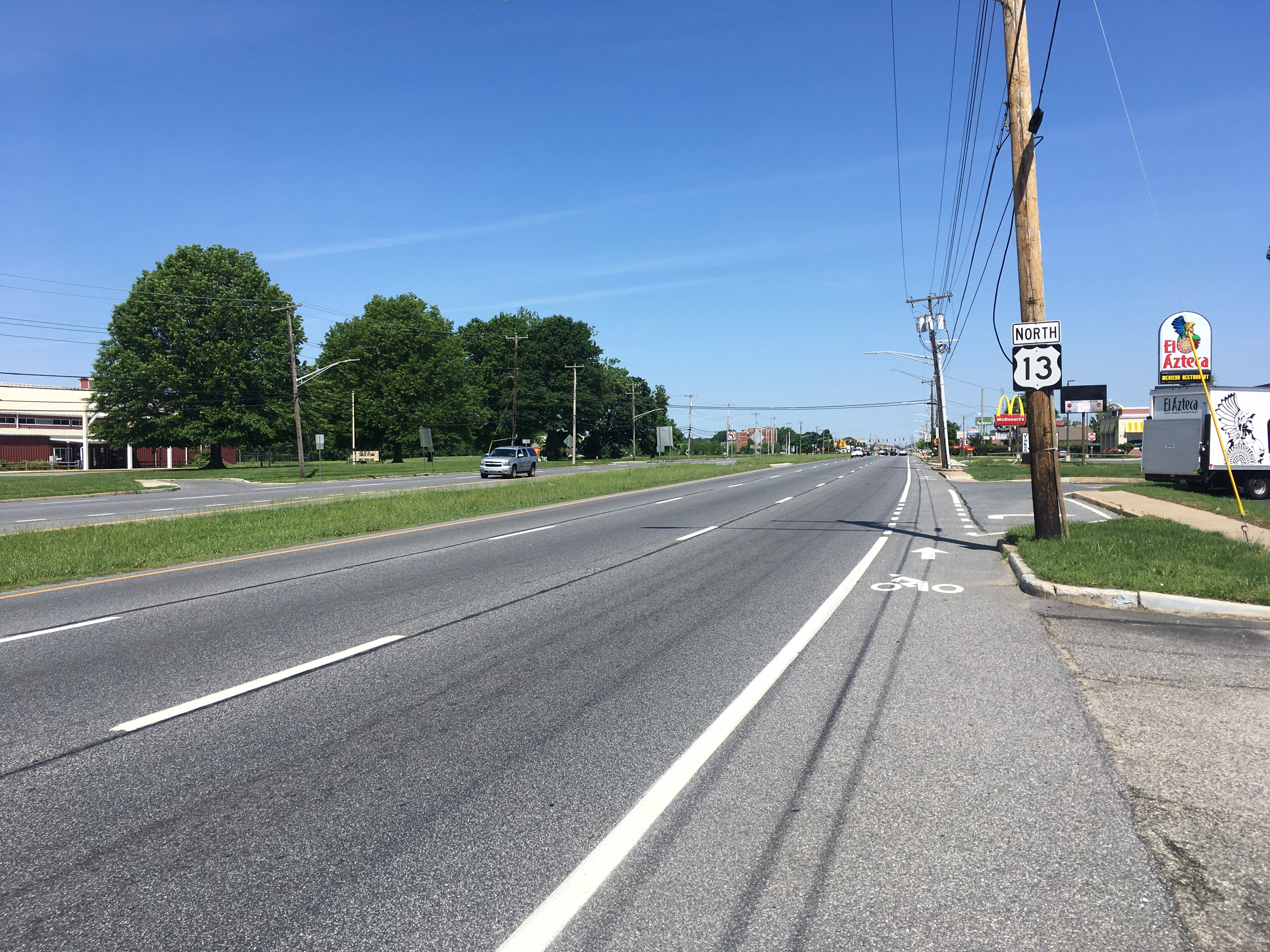
US 13 northbound on Dupont Highway in Dover

The main north–south highway through central Dover is U.S. Route 13, which runs through the main commercial strip of Dover on the multi-lane, divided Dupont Highway. An alternate route of U.S. Route 13, U.S. Route 13 Alternate, passes through downtown Dover on Governors Avenue. Delaware Route 8 is the main east–west route through Dover, passing through downtown on Division Street and West Dover on Forrest Avenue. It continues west toward Maryland to provide access to the Chesapeake Bay Bridge. Delaware Route 15 passes north–south through the western part of Dover along Hazlettville Road, West North Street, Saulsbury Road, and McKee Road. Dover is one of only four state capitals not served by an Interstate highway. Pierre, South Dakota; Jefferson City, Missouri; and Juneau, Alaska are the other three state capitals with this distinction.

Parking in the downtown area of Dover consists of free on-street two-hour parking and five off-street parking lots offering a total of 440 spaces. Parking lots in downtown Dover contain a mix of permit parking, parking meters, and free two-hour, 15-minute, and handicapped parking spaces along with spaces reserved for tenants and apartments. Parking is free on evenings and weekends.

Dover Air Force Base is located within the southeast corporate limits of Dover. Airports near Dover with commercial air service include the Wilmington Airport in Wilmington, the Wicomico Regional Airport in Salisbury, Maryland, the Baltimore-Washington International Thurgood Marshall Airport in Baltimore, and the Philadelphia International Airport in Philadelphia. Other general aviation airports near Dover include Chandelle Estates Airport to the northeast of the city, Delaware Airpark near Cheswold, and Jenkins Airport near Wyoming.

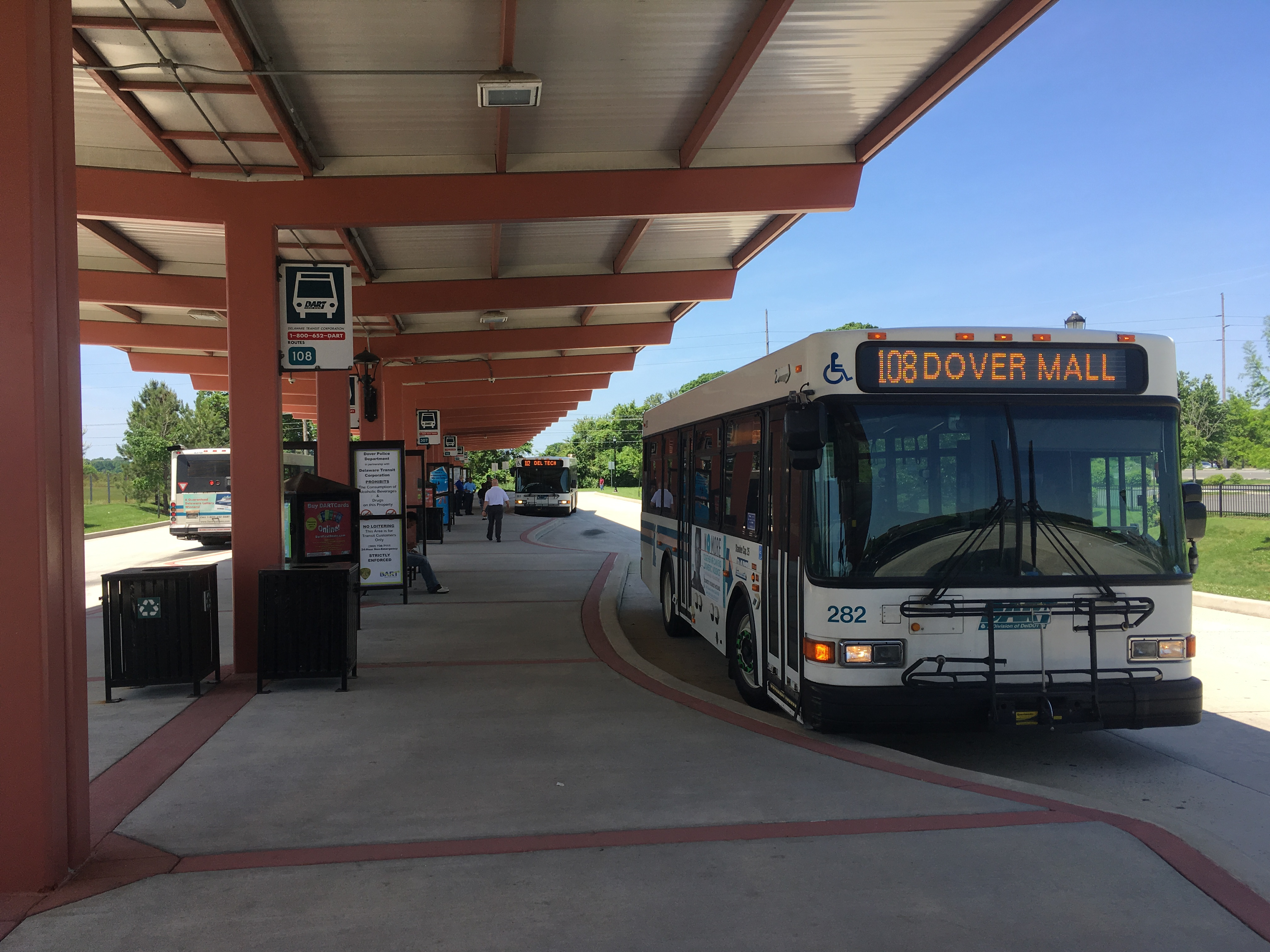
The Dover Transit Center, which serves as the main hub for DART First State buses in Dover

Dover is located on a former Pennsylvania Railroad line, later operated by Penn Central, Conrail, and Norfolk Southern and now operated by the Delmarva Central Railroad as its Delmarva Subdivision. Into the 1950s multiple PRR passenger trains daily, on a Philadelphia-Cape Charles, Virginia circuit, made stops in Dover, including the Del-Mar-Va Express and the night train, the Cavalier. Passenger service ended when the Blue Diamond was discontinued on December 31, 1965. In later years, Dover was served by special Amtrak trains to NASCAR races at Dover International Speedway and the Delaware State Fair in Harrington. Today, the rail line is just used for local freight. The closest passenger rail station is the Wilmington station in Wilmington, served by Amtrak's Northeast Corridor and SEPTA Regional Rail's Wilmington/Newark Line.

DART First State provides local bus service throughout Dover and Kent County, radiating as a hub-and-spoke system from the Dover Transit Center in downtown. They also provide inter-county service to Wilmington on the Route 301, Middletown on the Route 302, Georgetown on the Route 303, and Lewes on the Route 307 and seasonal service to Lewes on the Route 305 "Beach Connection".

Greyhound Lines are provided as intercity bus transportation along a route running between the Port Authority Bus Terminal in New York City and Richmond, Virginia, with a bus stop at the 7-Eleven store along U.S. Route 13 in the northern part of Dover.

=== Utilities ===
The city of Dover provides various utility services to businesses and residents. The Department of Public Works provides trash collection, recycling, water, and sewer service to the city. Republic Services provides recycling collection under contract to the city. The City of Dover Electric Department provides electricity to the city and some surrounding areas to the south and east, including the town of Little Creek. The city's electric department is a member of the Delaware Municipal Electric Corporation, a wholesale electric utility that represents municipal electric departments in the state of Delaware. The City of Dover Electric Department generates some of its electricity from the Van Sant Generating Station, which consists of one natural gas-powered unit that is used on a limited basis. The city also generates electricity from solar power at the Dover SUN Park, a 10 MW solar power farm on 103 acres at the Garrison Oak technology park owned by SunPower. The remainder of the city's electricity is purchased. Natural gas service in Dover is provided by Chesapeake Utilities.

=== Health care ===
Bayhealth Medical Center operates the Bayhealth Hospital, Kent Campus in Dover. The hospital offers various inpatient services including a birthing room and cardiovascular and cancer services. The Kent Campus also offers numerous outpatient services, patient and family support services, community outreach, and imaging services. The hospital has a 24-hour emergency room with a Level III trauma center.

== Notable people ==
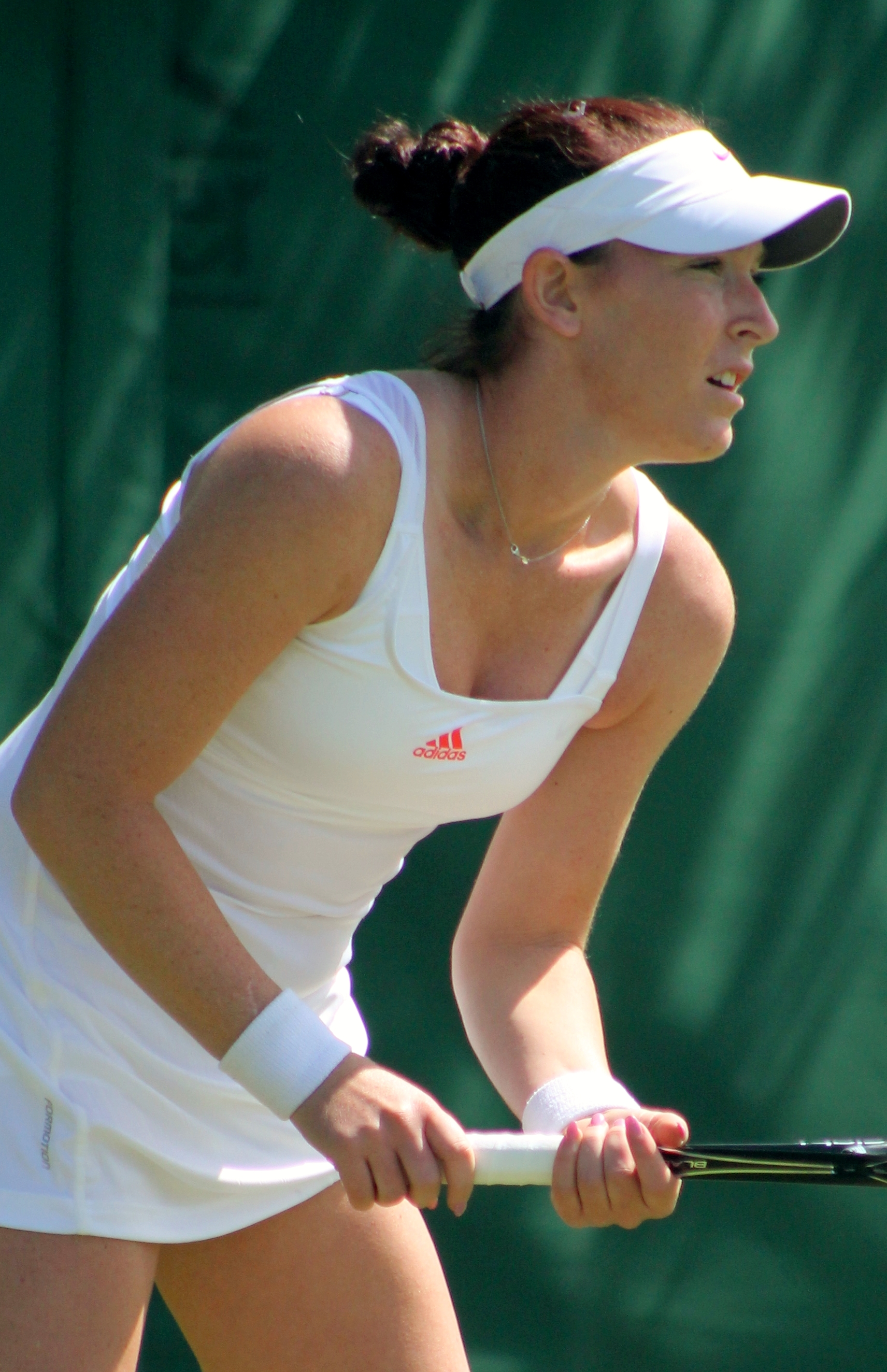
Madison Brengle

- Jacob Appel (born 1973), short story writer and bioethicist, lived in Dover 1982–1991
- David H. Berger (born 1959), 38th Commandant of the United States Marine Corps
- Madison Brengle (born 1990), professional tennis player
- Randy Bush (born 1958), Major League Baseball player
- Annie Jump Cannon (1863–1941), astronomer and co-creator of Harvard Classification Scheme
- Robert Crumb (born 1943), underground artist, lived in Dover from 1959 to 1961
- William D. Denney (1873–1953), 56th Governor of Delaware, born in Dover
- Murphy Guyer (born 1952), actor, director, playwright, born in Dover
- Doug Hutchison (born 1960), actor, born in Dover
- Gilder D. Jackson Jr. (1893–1966), Brigadier General USMC during World War II
- Mike Meade (born 1960), NFL player, born in Dover
- Teri Polo (born 1969), actress, born in Dover
- Mabel Lloyd Ridgely (1872–1962), suffragist and historical preservationist, based in Dover
- Ian Snell (born 1981), Major League Baseball pitcher
- Dave Taylor (born 1957), retired professional wrestler
- Rob Tornoe (born 1978), nationally syndicated, award-winning cartoonist, attended Dover High School
- Alexei Trader (born 1965), Eastern Orthodox bishop
