= Delaware State News =

- Type: Daily newspaper
- Format: Tabloid
- Owner(s): Independent Newsmedia Inc. USA
- President: Charlene Bisson, President & CEO
- Editor-in-chief: Andrew West
- Founded: May 24, 1902
- Headquarters: 110 Galaxy Drive, Dover, Delaware 19901, United States
- Circulation: 9,000 Daily (digital and print); 13,000 Sunday (digital and print) (as of 2023)
- ISSN: 0745-8096
- Website: baytobaynews.com

Delaware State News is an American daily newspaper published in Dover, Delaware. It is owned by Independent Newsmedia Inc. USA and prints seven days a week.

It bills itself as "The Capital Daily" and "downstate Delaware's dominant daily newspaper", primarily covering Dover and the state's two southern counties, Kent and Sussex. It is one of two dailies based in the state of Delaware; the other is The News Journal in New Castle County, at the state's northern end.

== History ==
The Delaware State News debuted as a four-page weekly newspaper in Dover in May 1902. Thirty years later, the paper said it aimed to deliver "a live, readable newspaper at all times. While Democratic in politics, we shall not swerve from our policy of many years' standing to maintain an independent attitude at all times. ..."

The paper was founded by Robert H. Wilson, who owned it from May 24, 1902, to June 28, 1908. He sold it to James C. Wickes, who owned it until his death August 1, 1945.

Wickes, who had cut his teeth in journalism as a printer's devil at a previous Dover paper in the early 1880s, was on the inaugural staff of the Delaware State News. Under his leadership, the paper championed the progressive politics of the day. He supported Woodrow Wilson and, in a series of editorials, was the first Delaware publisher to push for the presidential nomination of Franklin D. Roosevelt. He was affectionately known as the dean of Delaware publishers and as "Colonel Jim", having been appointed a Kentucky Colonel in 1935.

George Willets Parker purchased the paper from Wickes' estate in January 1946, then sold it half a year later to J. Hampton Barnes Jr.

Bernard "Jack" Smyth, a newspaper owner in Renovo, Pennsylvania, purchased the Delaware State News and a competing weekly in 1953 for $40,000 (equivalent to $470,100 in 2024), with the intention of turning it into a daily newspaper, after learning that Dover was the only state capital without one. The Delaware State News became the first daily newspaper in Delaware outside of Wilmington, starting with its edition of September 14, 1953.

Smyth moved to Arizona for health reasons in 1969, selling the paper to his children. His son Joe Smyth bought out his siblings' shares in the 1970s, establishing Independent Newspapers Inc. and expanding his holdings into Arizona and Florida. In 1991, he transferred ownership of the company to a nonprofit trust, INI Holdings Inc., to ensure that the papers remain independent.

In May 1997, the Delaware State News announced it would merge with the Daily Whale of Lewes, Delaware. The Lewes paper had been purchased by Independent Newspapers in March 1996.

Independent Newspapers Inc. changed its name to Independent Newsmedia Inc. USA in 2011.

== Sister papers ==
The Delaware State News is the East Coast flagship publication of Independent Newsmedia Inc. USA, a company founded by the Smyth family and now owned by a nonprofit trust. The company owns newspapers in Arizona, Delaware, Florida and Maryland, including the Daily Independent of Sun City, Arizona.

The Dover newsroom publishes four monthly community papers covering specific cities and regions in Delaware:

- Milford Chronicle of Milford, Delaware
- Smyrna Extra of Smyrna, Delaware
- Sussex Post of Sussex County, Delaware

Independent Newsmedia also owns three weekly newspapers nearby on the Delmarva Peninsula:

- Dorchester Banner of Cambridge, Maryland, published Wednesdays
- Crisfield-Somerset County Times of Crisfield, Maryland, published Wednesdays
- Salisbury Independent of Salisbury, Maryland, published Thursdays
