= John Bullen House =

Historic house in Delaware, United States

- U.S. National Register of Historic Places
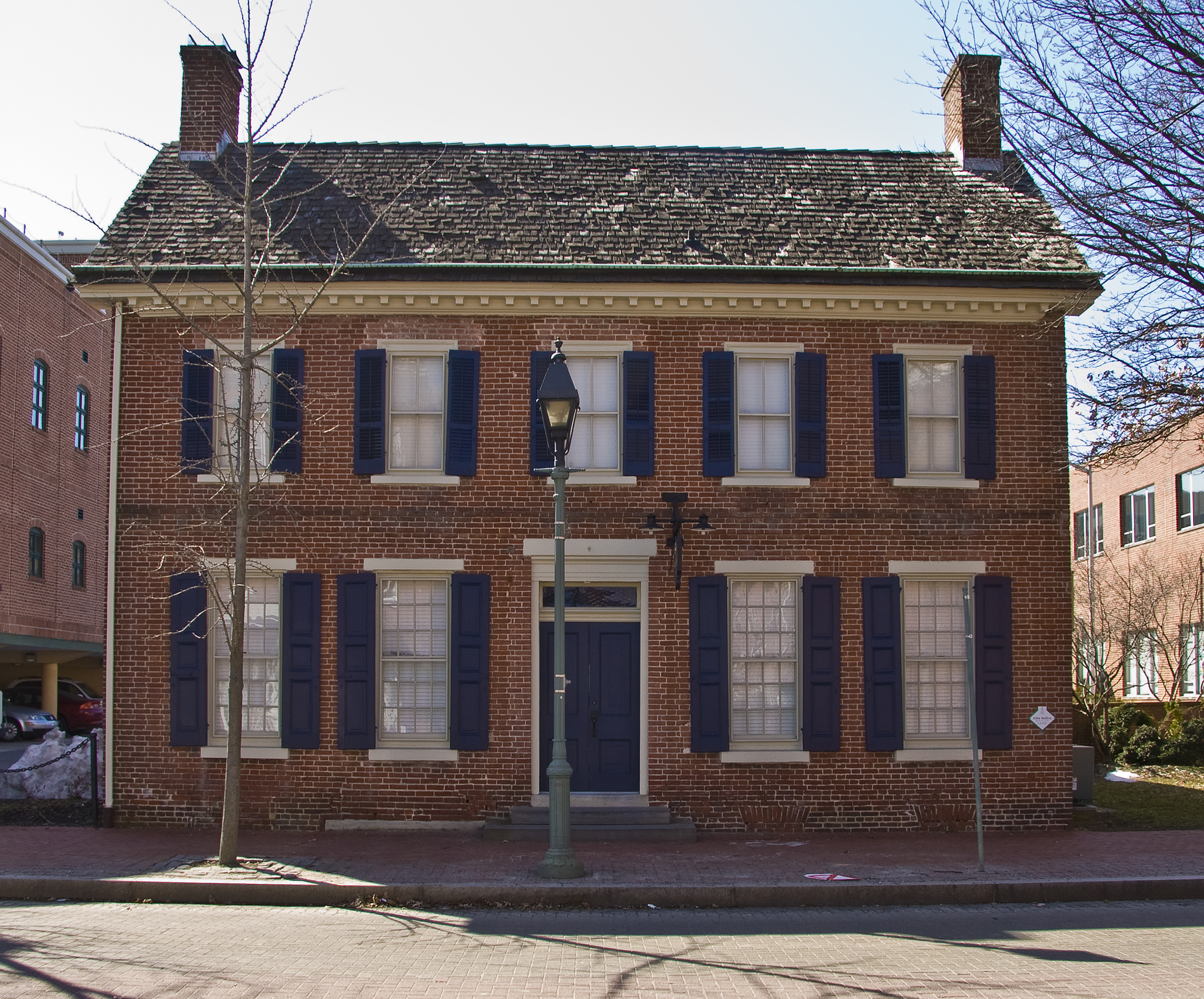
- John Bullen House, March 2010

- Location within Delaware Location within the United States
- Location: 214 S. State St., Dover, Delaware
- Coordinates: 39°9′28″N 75°31′29″W
- Area: 0.5 acres (0.20 ha)
- Built: 1775–1781
- Built by: Bullen, John
- NRHP reference No.: 75000542
- Added to NRHP: April 14, 1975

John Bullen House is a historic home located at Dover, Kent County, Delaware. It was built between 1775 and 1781, and is a 2 1/2-story, five bay center hall plan, brick dwelling. The interior retains original woodwork in the central hall, the former dining room, and the second floor south bedroom. The Farmers' Bank of Delaware purchased the house in 1959.

It was added to the National Register of Historic Places in 1975.
