= Pope (name) =

Pope is a surname of several proposed and likely convergent origins. It has been linked to the English surname Pape, likely having roots as a nickname for someone who plays a clergyman in pageantry or someone with a matching pompous disposition. It also has origins deriving from French and German surnames related to clergymen, and may also be a variant of the surname Poppe.

== Surname ==
Notable people with this surname include:

- Aaron Pope (born 1999), Scottish track cyclist
- Albert Augustus Pope (1843–1909), American bicycle and automobile manufacturer
- Alexander Pope (1688–1744), English poet
- Alexander Pope (actor) (1763–1835), Irish actor and painter
- Allen Lawrence Pope (1928–2020), American military and paramilitary aviator
- Anson W. Pope (1812–1871), American politician
- Arthur Upham Pope (1881–1969), American archaeologist and historian
- Barbara S. Pope (born 1951), U.S. Department of Defense official
- Barton C. Pope (1813–1862), Florida state representative
- Bill Pope (born 1952), American cinematographer
- Brent Pope (rugby analyst) (born 1962), New Zealand-born rugby analyst for Irish television
- Carl C. Pope (1834–1911), American legislator and jurist
- Carly Pope (born 1980), Canadian actress
- Carole Pope (born 1950), Canadian singer
- Cassadee Pope (born 1989), American singer
- Charles Pope (disambiguation), several people
- Cheryl Pope (fl. 2000s–2020s), American artist
- Christopher Pope (physicist) (fl. 1970s–2020s), American physicist
- Clifford H. Pope (1899–1974), American herpetologist
- Cora Scott Pond Pope (1856–after 1932), American teacher, pageant writer, real estate developer
- David Pope (disambiguation), several people
- Duane Earl Pope (born 1943), American bank robber and murderer
- Dudley Pope (1925–1997), British author
- Dudley Pope (cricketer) (1906–1934), English cricketer
- Eddie Pope (born 1973), American football (soccer) player
- Edmund Mann Pope (1837–1906), American military officer and politician
- Edwin Pope (1928–2017), American journalist
- Eva Pope (born 1967), English actress
- Evelyn Pope (1908–1995), American librarian
- Everett P. Pope (1919–2009), US Marine Corps officer and recipient of the Medal of Honor
- Frankie Pope (1884–1953), English association footballer
- Fred Pope (1909–1983), Scottish association footballer
- Generoso Pope (1891–1950), Italian-American businessman
- Generoso Pope Jr. (1927–1988), American media mogul
- Georgina Pope (1862–1938), Canadian military nurse
- Gustav Pope (1831–1910), British painter
- Hugh Pope (1869–1946), English Dominican biblical scholar
- James Pope (disambiguation), several people
- Jessie Pope (1868–1941), English poet
- John Pope (disambiguation), several people
- Jordan Pope (born 2003), American basketball player
- Kyle Pope (fl. 2010s–2020s), American editor and publisher
- Laurence Pope (1945–2020), American diplomat
- Lawrence Pope (1940–2013), American lawyer and legislator
- Leonard Pope (born 1983), American football player
- Leslie Pope (1954–2020), American set decorator
- Lloyd Pope (born 1999), Australian cricketer
- Lucas Pope (born 1977/78), American video game developer
- Lynda Pope (born 1953), Australian chess player
- Mal Pope (born 1960), Welsh musician
- Manassa Thomas Pope (1858–1934), American physician
- Marion Manville Pope (1859–1930), American poet, author, traveler, philanthropist
- Mark Pope (born 1972), American basketball player and coach
- Martin Pope (1918–2022), American physical chemist
- Marvin H. Pope (1916–1997), American scholar of Hebrew
- Maurice Arthur Pope, Canadian diplomat
- Maurice Pope (linguist) (1926–2019), British linguist
- Nathaniel Pope (1784–1850), American politician and judge of Illinois
- Nick Pope (disambiguation), several people
- Norm Pope (1908–1985), Australian rugby league footballer
- Odean Pope (born 1938), American tenor saxophonist
- Ollie Pope (born 1998), English cricketer
- Paul Pope (born 1970), American alternative cartoonist
- Peggy Pope (1929–2020), American actress
- Percival C. Pope (1841–1922), American Marine Corps Brevet Medal recipient
- Pocahontas Pope (1864–1938), American Baháʼí Faith practitioner
- Roland Pope (1864–1952), Australian cricketer and ophthalmologist
- Samuel Pope (1826–1901), English barrister
- Spencer Pope (1893–1976), American football player
- Susan W. Pope (born 1942), American politician
- Sydney Pope (1898–1980), Irish military pilot for the British Empire
- Tim Pope (born 1956), music video director
- Tom Pope (born 1985), English association footballer
- Tony Pope (1947–2004), American voice actor
- Vyvyan Pope (1891–1941), British World War II General
- Walter Pope (1627–1714), English astronomer and writer
- Walter Elmer Pope (1879–1944), American politician and lawyer
- Walter Lyndon Pope (1889–1969), United States federal court judge
- William Jackson Pope (1870–1939), English chemist
- William Pope (1825–1905), English clergyman
- William Godfrey Thomas Pope (1880–1943), British engineer and businessman in Portugal

== Given name ==
- Popé (c. 1630 – c. 1692), or Po'pay, Pueblo leader of the Pueblo republic and 1680 Pueblo Revolt
- Pope Yeatman (1861–1953), American mining engineer

== Nickname ==
- Eoin O'Mahony (politician) (1905–1970), Irish barrister, genealogist, and political activist referred to as Eoin "the Pope" O'Mahony
- Paul Castellano (1915–1985), Mafia boss frequently referred to as "The Pope"
- Donn Pall (born 1962), American baseball player nicknamed "The Pope"
- The Pope (wrestler) (born 1978), a ring name of Elijah Burke

== Fictional characters ==
- Pope, a family surname in Sons of Anarchy
- Eli Pope, a character on the television series Scandal
- Francis Pope, a character in the comic strip Big Nate
- Henry Pope (Prison Break)
- Olivia Pope, a character on the television series Scandal

== See also ==
- Popo (disambiguation)
