= Clow Rebellion =

1778 insurrection in Delaware, US

The Clow Rebellion
- Part of the American Revolutionary War
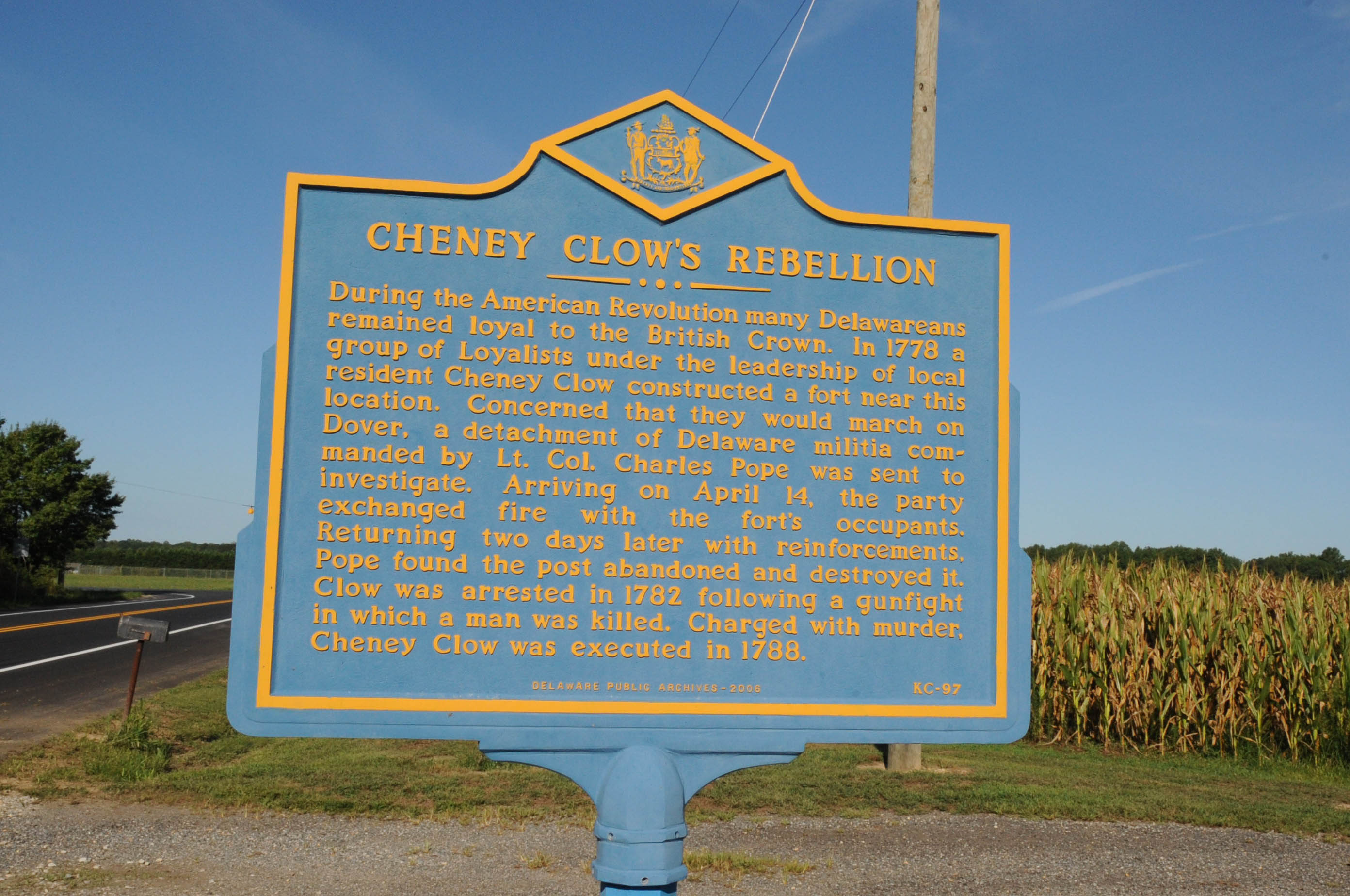
- Historical marker for the site of Clow's Rebellion
Date	April 14–17, 1778
Location	Kenton, Delaware
Result	Patriot Victory

Belligerents
United States	(Kingdom of Great Britain) Loyalist militia

Commanders and leaders
(United States) Charles Pope	Cheney Clow (executed)

Strength
Delaware and Maryland Militia	200 Loyalists

Casualties and losses
1 dead	1 dead 1 executed

The Clow Rebellion was a Loyalist insurrection that took place in mid-April 1778, during the American Revolutionary War. It took place on the Delaware side of the Maryland-Delaware border and was led by Cheney Clow (sometimes spelled "China" Clow). The rebellion was suppressed by Maryland and Delaware militia.

The insurrection was spurred by a foraging party that arrived in the area in late-February under the command of Henry Lee, who collected supplies for the Continental Army stationed at Valley Forge, Pennsylvania. Discontent over the foraging party led to the formation of an insurrection in March, which grew larger by mid-April, and coalesced under the command of Clow. The insurgents were active in both Maryland and Delaware. Commanding about 200 Loyalists, Clow constructed a fort on his own property, northwest of Dover, near what is today Kenton, Delaware. General William Smallwood sent Colonel Charles Pope to quell the insurrection in early April. He gathered local militia, and approached Clow's fort to investigate on April 14. Clow responded by sending 150 of his men to oppose Pope's militia, and "a smart fire" erupted which left one dead on each side. Pope was forced to retreat, and called upon reinforcements to disperse Clow's force. Pope received reinforcements from both the Maryland and Delaware militia, and attacked Clow's fort again on April 16 or 17, and dispersed the Loyalists. The militia then burned the fort, and captured many of the Loyalist insurgents, although Clow escaped.

== Clow's arrest, trial, and execution ==
In 1782, Clow was arrested for treason by the State of Delaware. Clow was convicted of murder and executed by hanging in 1783.
