= National Register of Historic Places listings in Delaware =

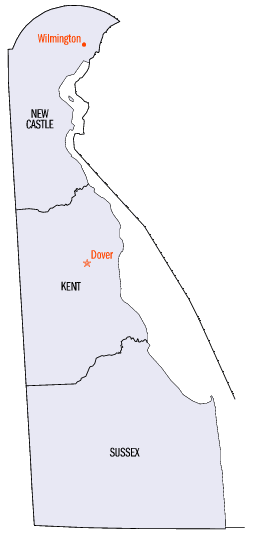

Buildings, sites, districts, and objects in Delaware listed on the National Register of Historic Places:

- for Dover, see: Kent County
- for Georgetown, see: Sussex County
- for Newark, see: Newark
- for Wilmington, see: Wilmington

Contents: Counties and municipalities in Delaware
Newark (New Castle) | Wilmington (New Castle) | Northern New Castle | Southern New Castle | Kent | Sussex

== Current listings by county ==
The following are approximate tallies of current listings by county. These counts are based on entries in the National Register Information Database as of April 24, 2008 and new weekly listings posted since then on the National Register of Historic Places web site. There are frequent additions to the listings and occasional delistings and the counts here are approximate and not official. New entries are added to the official Register on a weekly basis. Also, the counts in this table exclude boundary increase and decrease listings which modify the area covered by an existing property or district and which carry a separate National Register reference number. The numbers of NRHP listings in each county are documented by tables in each of the individual county list-articles.

	County	# of Sites
1	Kent	157
2.1	New Castle: Newark	49
2.2	New Castle: Wilmington	91
2.3	Southern New Castle	87
2.4	Northern New Castle	177
2.4	New Castle duplicate	(1)
2.5	New Castle: Total	403
3	Sussex	151
(duplicates)		(2)
TOTAL		708

== Gallery ==
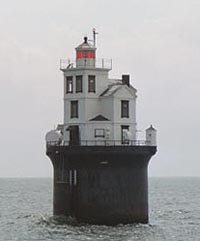
Fourteen Foot Bank Light

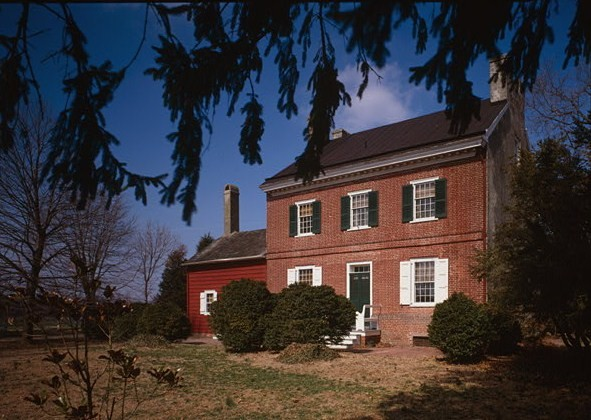
Aspendale

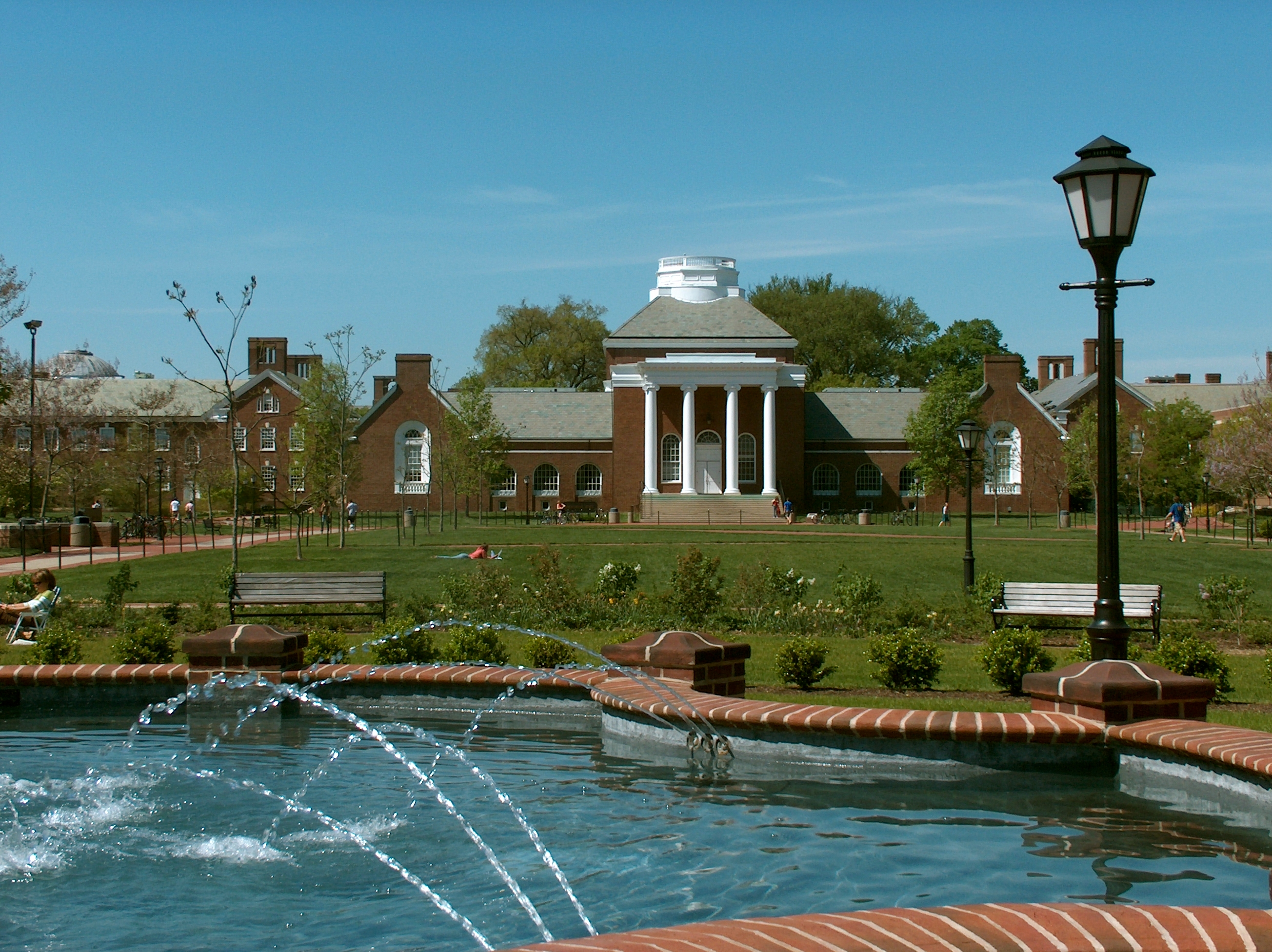
Memorial Hall (Newark, Delaware)

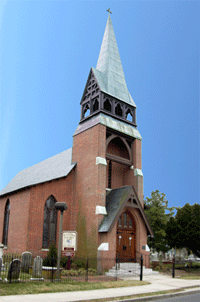
St. Paul's Episcopal Church (Georgetown, Delaware)

== See also ==
- List of National Historic Landmarks in Delaware
- List of bridges on the National Register of Historic Places in Delaware
