= Charles Pope (disambiguation) =

Charles Pope can refer to:

- Charles Pope (1883–1917), Australian recipient of the Victoria Cross
- Charles Pope (English cricketer) (1872–1959), English cricketer
- Charles Pope (South African cricketer) (1946–2020), South African cricketer
- Charles G. Pope (died 1893), American lawyer
- Charles Pope (Continental Army officer), officer during the American Revolutionary War
