= Thomas Lamb Farm =

Historic house in Delaware, United States

- U.S. National Register of Historic Places
- Location within Delaware Location within the United States
- Location: Road 130; Kenton, Delaware
- Coordinates: 39°17′35″N 75°41′4″W
- Area: 1.4 acres (0.57 ha)
- MPS: Kenton Hundred MRA
- NRHP reference No.: 83001374
- Added to NRHP: August 29, 1983

Thomas Lamb Farm, also known as "Brick House Farm", is a historic home located at Kenton, Kent County, Delaware. The house dates to the second quarter of the 18th-century, and is a two-story, three-bay, single pile brick dwelling. It has a hall-and-parlor plan. Attached is a 1 1/2-story, three-bay brick kitchen wing with a porch.

== History ==
Between 1830 and 1850, Thomas Lamb purchased the land and house from the Chiffen family. Lamb died in 1872 and left the 700 acres to his widow and children.
It was listed on the National Register of Historic Places in 1983.
