= Jefferson Lewis House =

Historic house in Delaware, United States

- U.S. National Register of Historic Places
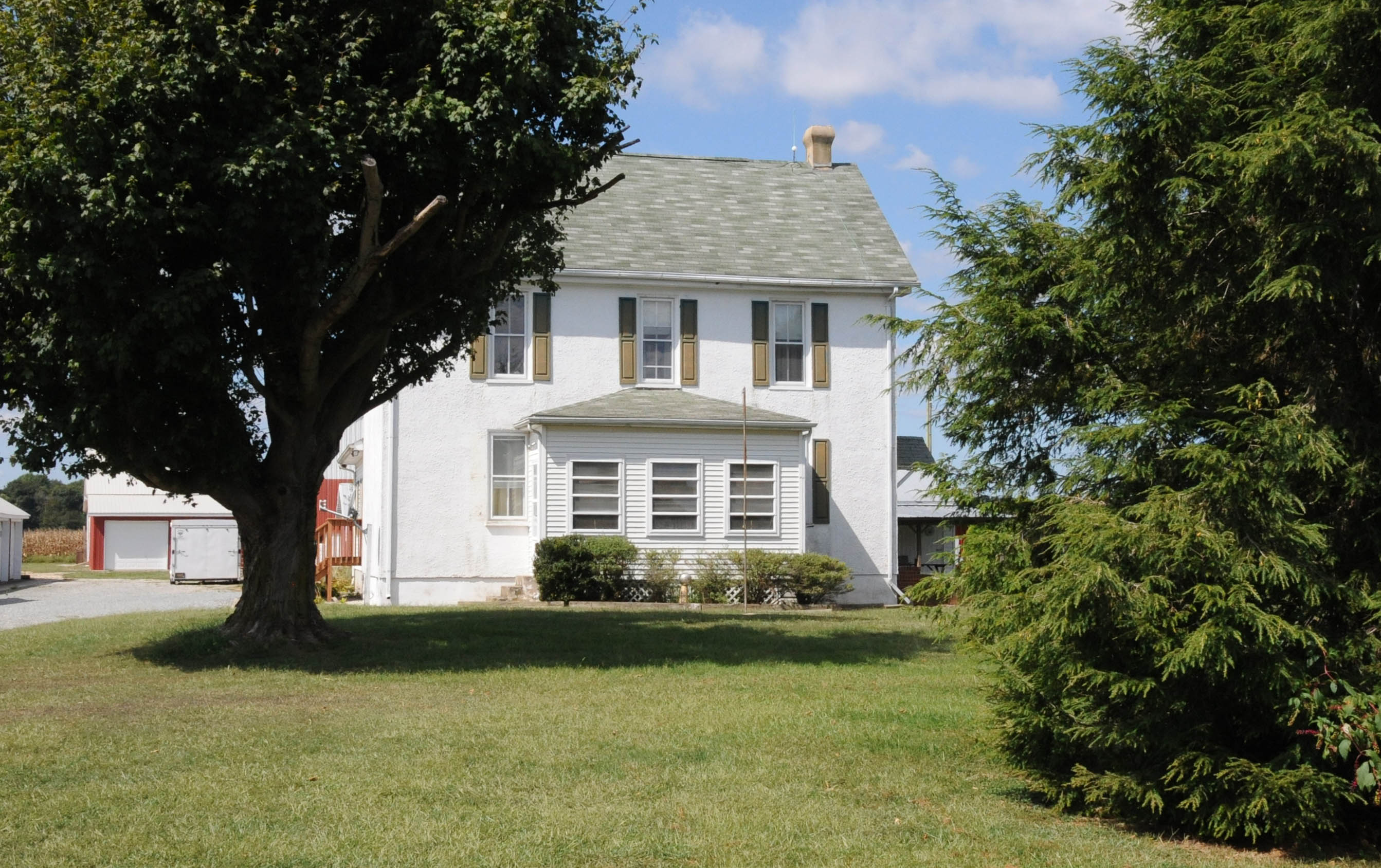

- Location within Delaware Location within the United States
- Location: 1291 Seeneytown Road, Kenton, Delaware
- Coordinates: 39.213297°N 75.632669°W
- Area: 57.4 acres (23.2 ha)
- Built: c. 1800
- MPS: Kenton Hundred MRA
- NRHP reference No.: 83001349
- Added to NRHP: June 27, 1983

Jefferson Lewis House is a historic home located in Kent County, Delaware near Kenton. The house was built about 1800, and is a two-story, three-bay, center hall plan stuccoed brick dwelling with a gable roof. Attached is a rear frame wing. The front facade features a porch, added in the late-19th century. Also on the property are three two-story barns, and a mix of late-19th and early-20th-century milk houses, corn cribs, machine sheds and chicken houses.

It was listed on the National Register of Historic Places in 1983.
