= Cheney Clow =

American loyalist from Delaware

- Scene of Cheyney Clow's Rebellion
- U.S. National Register of Historic Places
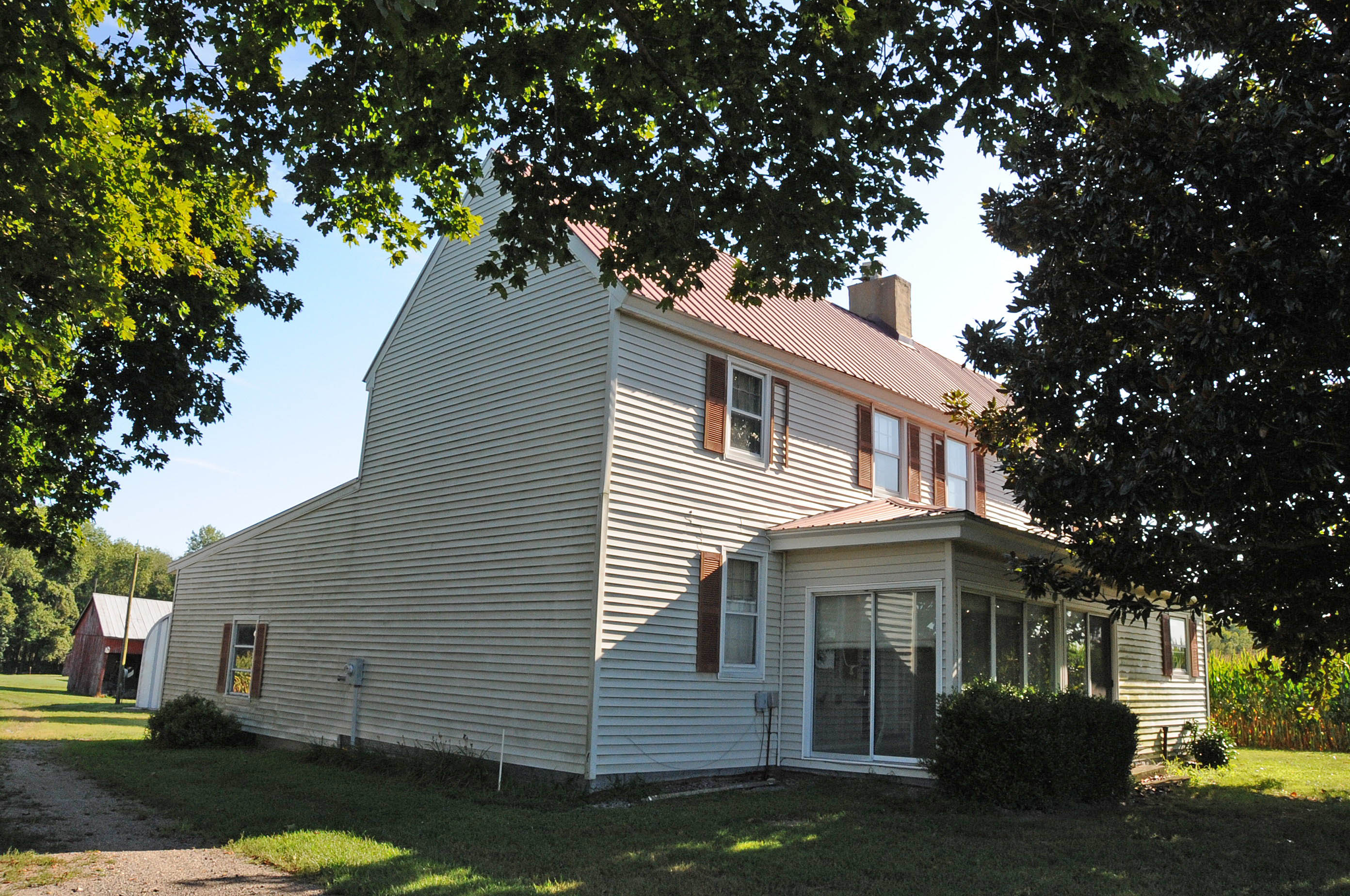

- Location within Delaware Location within the United States
- Location: West of Kenton on Delaware Route 300, near Kenton, Delaware
- Coordinates: 39°12′15″N 75°44′35″W
- Area: 160 acres (65 ha)
- NRHP reference No.: 74000598
- Added to NRHP: January 14, 1974

Cheney Clow (1734–September 15, 1783) was a loyalist from Delaware Colony during the American Revolution who staged a rebellion against the colonial government that was advocating separation from Great Britain.

== Early life ==
Cheney Clow was born in 1734 in Delaware Colony, the third of nine children of Nathaniel Clow and his wife Susannah. They lived in Queen Anne's County, Province of Maryland, owned their own farm, of unknown acres but was said to have been considerable. Land recorded in 1744, 50 acres (200,000 m^{2}) was named "Clow's Hope." In 1747 another 50 acres (200,000 m^{2}) was recorded and it was called "Boon's Hope". Boon's Hope cost Nathaniel and Susannah 2,100 pounds of tobacco, which was a common practice in the early colonies, paying for items with tobacco off your own land.

Nathaniel Clow died in 1748; his estate papers and will are filed in the courthouse in Annapolis. He wanted his estate divided equally among his wife and children. The children were John (born 1732), Mary (born 1733), Cheney (born 1734), Susannah (born 1737), Rachael (born 1738), James (born 1740), Sarah (born 1742), Rebecca (born 1743) and Ann (born 1749).

Susannah Clow died before 1756. The exact date is unknown.

== Marriage and family ==
Cheney Clow married Elizabeth Barcus (Barkhurst) and settled in the same area as Nathaniel and Susannah. They farmed and raised a family. They had two children that are known of, Joshua and Arrana.

== Cheney Clow's Rebellion, capture and imprisonment ==
At the outbreak of the American War of Independence, about a third of the colonists had no desire for independence from Britain but in Kent County, Delaware, where Cheney Clow was living, the Loyalist were greatly outnumbered. Cheney chose to support the King of Britain and was commissioned a British officer at some point either earlier before the Revolution began or toward the beginning of Colonial Revolutionary activities. He now found himself a Tory. As the war progressed the Tories constantly created terror by raiding and plundering the colonists, sent supplies to the British, robbed the mails, plotted against the life of Washington, and generally became very disliked by their neighbors.

During the War, in 1778, the colony passed a law requiring all male citizens over the age of 21 to take an "Oath of Allegiance." A Tory would be pardoned if the Oath was given, if not he would suffer the confiscation of all his land and possessions. When it became time for Cheney's Oath he refused. He also refused to pay taxes to Delaware claiming he was living in Maryland. His farm was on both sides of the state line but the house sat in Delaware.

On the morning of April 18, 1778, the Sheriff of Kent County, Delaware, John Clayton, went out to arrest Cheney Clow. This attempt erupted into a gun battle and one of the Sheriff's men, named Moore, was killed. Cheney was charged with the murder of the posse member Moore. Moore had been shot in the back while facing and firing toward Cheney Clow when he was shot. It is thought that Moore was shot by a member of his own posse. When the battle was over, Cheney's wife, Susannah, who had been helping her husband load rifles, was wounded, and Cheney was arrested and taken to jail. This action 200 years later would be known as "Cheney Clow's Rebellion".

== Murder trial and execution ==
On December 12, 1782, Cheney Clow was brought to trial. He was tried for treason for his role in the Loyalist rebellion against Delaware. The jury found him not guilty of treason and he was acquitted, but authorities kept him in prison. It seemed that Cheney hadn't taken the oath and therefore could not be charged with treason. Keeping him in prison, they charged him with burglary and murder; later the burglary charge was dropped for lack of evidence, but he had to stand trial on the murder charge.

At the murder trial, the testimony from the Sheriff was that Moore was shot in the back, and not from Cheney's gun, but probably was shot from one of the Sheriff's own men who was firing toward Cheney from a position behind Moore. The evidence that Clow actually killed the man was weak. However, this did not sway the jury. In May 1783, a jury convicted him of murder and the judge sentenced him to death. Clow was executed by hanging on September 15, 1783.

== The site description of Clow Rebellion ==
The present and original appearance of the site of the Clow Rebellion was summarized in the US Department of the Interior, National Park Service, National Register of Historic Places Inventory Nomination Form:

The scene of Cheyney Clow's Rebellion is on two farms, very near the Maryland line, in Delaware's Kent County; both farms extend across the line into Maryland in Northern Queen Anne's County. The southern half of the site is the farm of Mary Ford, on which stands the Clark House, a 2 1/2-story structure that was built in three parts, with frame portions flanking the original two-bay brick portion. Part of this house may have been standing during the Revolution.

Northward from the Clark House, the Gravelly Branch of Chester River divides the Ford farm from the Holtz farm. Nearby is the survey corner that in 1829 was described as being near the Cheyney Clow fort site.

In 1829, while James E. B. Clark was assembling his farm, he bought a piece of land from John and Sophia Chase. One of the corners of the deed was a "small distance above Cheyney Clow's fort." When this deed is plotted, the point is very near the Gravelly Branch bridge, north of the stream. This property had descended through the heirs of Robert Wright, a governor of Maryland; his father, Solomon Wright, a member of the Maryland convention of 1775, had owned the property during the Revolution.

Because the fort lay on or near the Wright-Tilghman property line, it is impossible to discover who owned it during the Revolution. Since both owners were ardent patriots, it is impossible that they would have knowingly harbored Cheyney Clow.

The acreage that is the subject of-this nomination was the scene of Cheyney Clow's Rebellion. Documentary sources place Clow's fort on the site, although cursory archaeological surface collection has failed to reveal tangible evidence of its exact location. Since the fort probably stood in a large swamp near the confluence of two prongs of Gravelly Branch, it is unlikely that many surface indications would be found in the plowed fields nearby.

It is known from contemporary military dispatches that the fort stood in the swamps. According to an 1839 article, some logs of the fort were still in place, even though the Delaware militia is supposed to have burned it. Since scorching retards rot, and since logs in wet ground sometimes last many years, it is not surprising that part of the structure should have survived for half a century after 'the battle.

== Significance of the rebellion ==
The Statement of Significance of the Cheney Clough Rebellion site from the US Department of the Interior, National Park Service, National Register of Historic Places Inventory Nomination Form continues with:

Cheney Clow's Fort site and the surrounding fields were the scene of Kent County, DE's only Revolutionary battle. Although the fort no longer stands, the two farms on which the battle took place are still under cultivation. The character of the neighboring country has changed little since the Revolution.

Cheyney Clow was a local eccentric who obtained a British commission and raised a force of Tories along the western boundary of Delaware. Although the line between Delaware and Maryland had been finally settled a few years earlier, Clow insisted that he was a Marylander; even though his house lay 200 yards inside Delaware, he refused to pay Delaware taxes.

He led his small band of loyalists in raids on the scattered farms of the area, until the inhabitants appealed for military protection. Charles Pope was sent to put down the rebellion, and camped with his Delaware militia at Grogtown (now Kenton, DE). In a letter to Caesar Rodney on April 14, 1778, Pope reported that Clow had a fort erected nearby. Two days later, he informed Rodney that he had ordered "militia from the Head of Chester to join me at Marches Quarter within one-mile and a half of their fortress." The attack proved unsuccessful; Clow fled, and the militia burned the fort. In May, the Delaware Assembly called for inhabitants to take an oath of loyalty, which Clow refused. In 1782, a warrant was issued for Clow's arrest on charges of treason, and the sheriff of Kent County, Delaware was sent to take him in custody. Clow and his wife defended their house; a man was shot, and Clow was taken prisoner. He was eventually sentenced to hang, but the sentence was not executed until 1788, when he asked the State to decide between pardon and death. Public sentiment, which had been a factor in the decision to hang him, changed almost immediately after his death. Clow became a popular martyr, who had been unjustly executed because of his political convictions. The circumstances surrounding Cheyney Clow's last ten years serve to emphasize Kent County's indifferent support of the Revolutionary cause.

Archaeological exploration, to determine the exact fort site, would be desirable.

== Legacy ==
After Cheney Clow was hanged, most of his children stayed in the Northern Queen Anne's County, Maryland and Kent County, Delaware area, raised families and lived their lives passing from generation to generation until the present day. One of Cheney's children, his son Joshua, left the Maryland and Delaware area, changed the spelling of the name to Clough and moved west to the Ohio Valley. Documents show a marriage certificate of Joshua Clough and Sarah Walker being married in Kent County, Delaware, on October 2, 1794, and they had a son, Edward, who was born in 1794 in Virginia.

Joshua Clow died in Harrison County, Ohio, where a large contingent of descendants still reside.

Most of the other lineal descendants of Cheney Clow have lived in and around the area where Cheney Clow lived and had his rebellion, in the Northern Queen Anne's County, Maryland area, specifically the town of Sudlersville, Maryland, ever since. The Clow name has changed over time and many of the Clow lineage in the area now go by both Clow and Clough. On April 6, 1967, the local County Newspaper, the Queen Anne's County Record Observer, ran a story with the headline, "Sudlersville Couple are Married 67 Years!" This couple were Dudley Clow and his wife Emma Everett Clow. Mr. Clow was 90 years old at the time and of interest is that the family still used the 'Clow' spelling instead of 'Clough'. In 1969, the same newspaper published a photograph of five generations of Cheney Clow's descendants sitting together on a park bench. All were farmers and/or residents of the local Sudlersville community. In April 2009, a direct descendant of Cheney Clow, while serving as the local Fire Chief of the Sudlersville Volunteer Fire Company was killed in a single vehicle crash while responding to an alarm in a Fire Department Emergency Response Vehicle. Forty-one-year-old Charles F. "Buck" Clough Jr. was hailed as a hero, made national news and his accident and death has had a profound effect on the small, tight-knit farming community.

Cheney Clow's descendants suffered another terrible blow in the last part of 2009 when Nelson H. "Dickie" Clough of Millington, Maryland died on Christmas Eve, December 24, 2009. He was 85. He was the uncle and best friend of Charles F. "Buck" Clough Jr. and was the current cornerstone of the huge Clough clan in the Northern Queen Anne's County area.

He was a member of the United States Army during World War II. He served with D Company, 83rd Armored Reconnaissance Battalion, 3rd Armored Division. He fought in the Battle of the Bulge, the Ardennes and the Rhineland. He fought in and across Europe until Victory in Europe was declared. He was a life member of VFW Post 652 in Millington, Maryland, where he served as Commander 5 times and he was a member of the American Legion Post 14, Smyrna, Delaware. His death has also had a profound effect on the local community and the Clough family in particular.

Cheney Clow's life and legacy continue to influence the area, and his life and actions are still rippling through the fabric of life in the Kent County, Delaware and Northern Queen Anne's County, Maryland areas.
