= Somerville (Kenton, Delaware) =

Historic house in Delaware, United States

- U.S. National Register of Historic Places
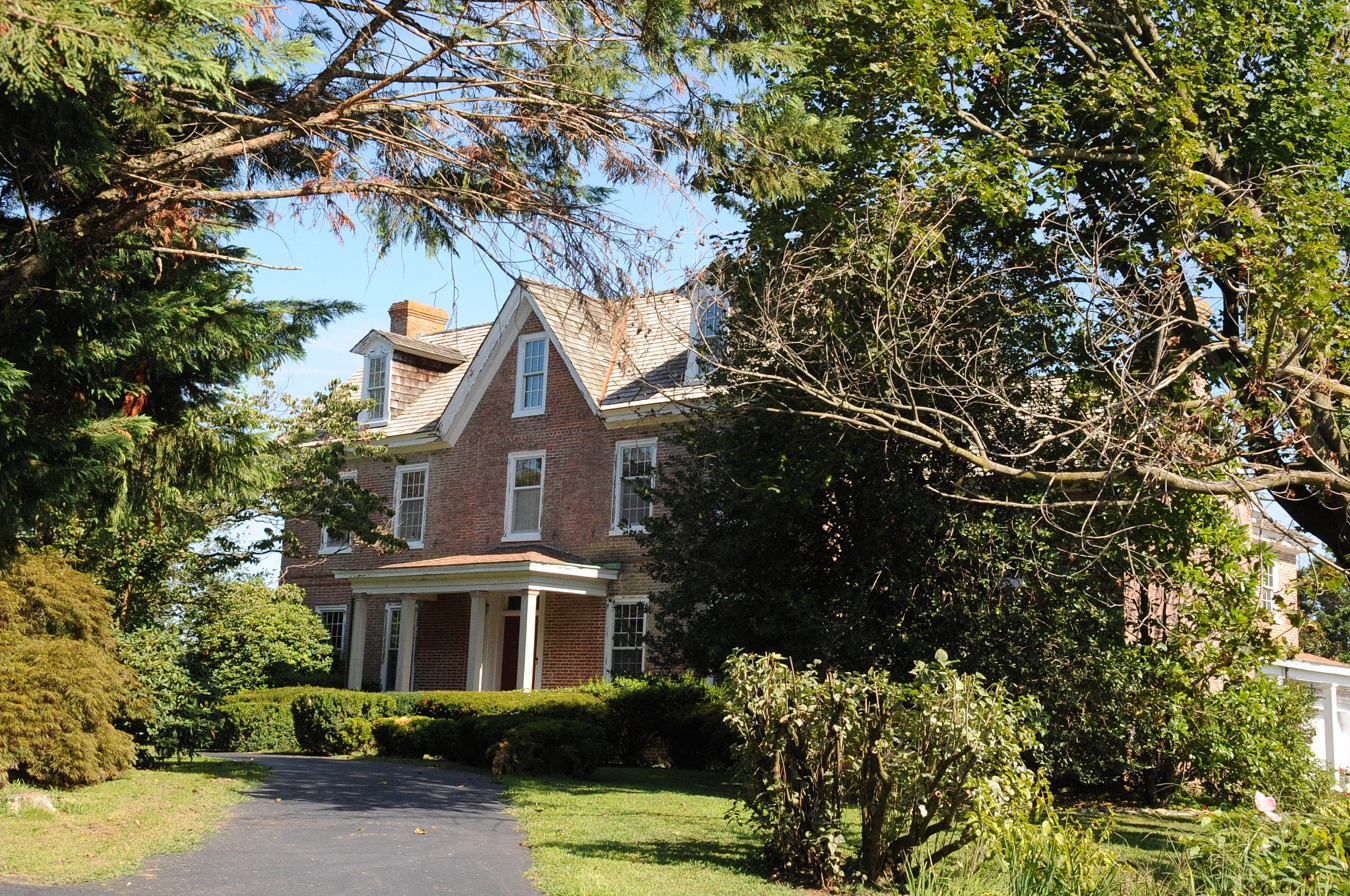

- Location within Delaware Location within the United States
- Location: 1073 7 Hickories Road, Kenton, Delaware
- Coordinates: 39.221536°N 75.645967°W
- Area: 25 acres (10 ha)
- Built: c. 1798, c. 1806
- NRHP reference No.: 74000599
- Added to NRHP: December 31, 1974

Somerville is a historic home located near Kenton, Kent County, Delaware. It is a two-story, five-bay, brick structure with a Victorian cross-gable roof and portico. The rear wing was the original dwelling, built about 1798. This section was expanded about 1806. Also on the property is a contributing brick barn. It was the home of Delaware statesman Nicholas Ridgely.

It was listed on the National Register of Historic Places in 1974.
