= Popo =

Popo may refer to:

== Entertainment ==
- Popo (album), a 1951 jazz album by Shorty Rogers and Art Pepper
- Mr. Popo, a character in the manga and anime series Dragon Ball
- Popo (film), a 2008 Dutch short film by Richard Raaphorst
- Popo, a character in the Japanese anime series Kaiba
- Popo, a player-controlled character in the Nintendo video game Ice Climber

== People ==
=== Given name or surname ===
- Popo Aumavae (born 1999), American football player
- Popo Molefe (born 1952), South African politician
- Hira Te Popo (died 1889), New Zealand tribal leader
- Sundar Popo (1943-2000), Trinidad and Tobago musician
- Tosan Popo (born 1992), English footballer

=== Nickname ===
- Popó (footballer, born 1978), Brazilian footballer
- Popo (footballer, born 1988), Spanish footballer
- Popó (footballer, born 1998), Angolan footballer
- Popó Vaz (1985–2022), Brazilian police officer and digital influencer
- Paul Chiang (conductor), or Po-po Chiang, Taiwanese conductor, producer and chamber musician
- Acelino Freitas, or Popó (born 1975), Brazilian boxer
- Mario Alberto Peña (1980–2013, American drug lord
- Pauline Phillips (1918–2013), American advice columnist and radio show host
- Vinícius Popó (born 2001), Brazilian footballer

== Other uses ==
- Popo FC, a football club in Pakistan
- Popocatépetl, an active volcano in Mexico, also called El Popo
- Gen language, spoken in Togo
- Phla language, spoken in Benin and Togo
- Po-po or popo, slang for a police officer
- Popo (Mexican beverage), an indigenous Mexican beverage, made with cocoa

== See also ==
- Grand-Popo, a town and commune in the Mono Department of south-western Benin
- Izta-Popo Zoquiapan National Park, on the border of the Mexican states of México and Puebla
- Little Popo, a town in southeastern Togo
- Te Popo, a settlement on the North Island of New Zealand
- Po Po, Burmese installation and performance artist born Hla Oo
