= Benjamin Blackiston House =

Historic house in Delaware, United States

- U.S. National Register of Historic Places
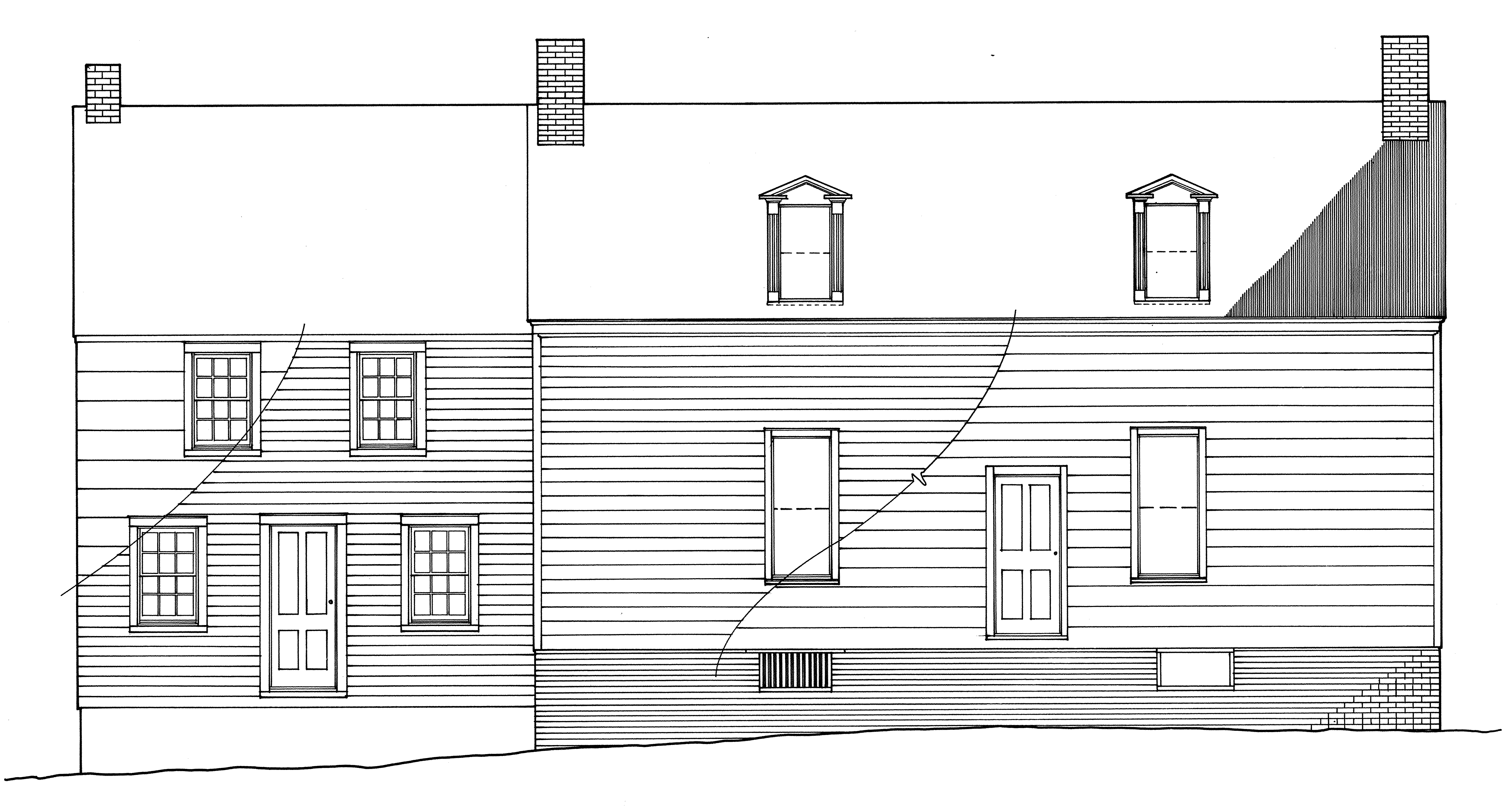
- A 1983 drawing of the north elevation

- Location within Delaware Location within the United States
- Location: Off Delaware Route 6, Kenton, Delaware
- Coordinates: 39°15′7″N 75°44′13″W
- Area: 0.1 acres (0.040 ha)
- Built: c. 1760
- MPS: Kenton Hundred MRA
- NRHP reference No.: 83001363
- Added to NRHP: June 27, 1983

Benjamin Blackiston House, also known as Deer Park, is a historic home located near Kenton in Kent County, Delaware. It was built about 1760, and is a 1 1/2-story, three-bay, vernacular frame dwelling. It was originally built on the Penn plan, but later enlarged to six bays.

It was listed on the National Register of Historic Places in 1983.
