= T. H. Denny House =

Historic house in Delaware, United States

- U.S. National Register of Historic Places
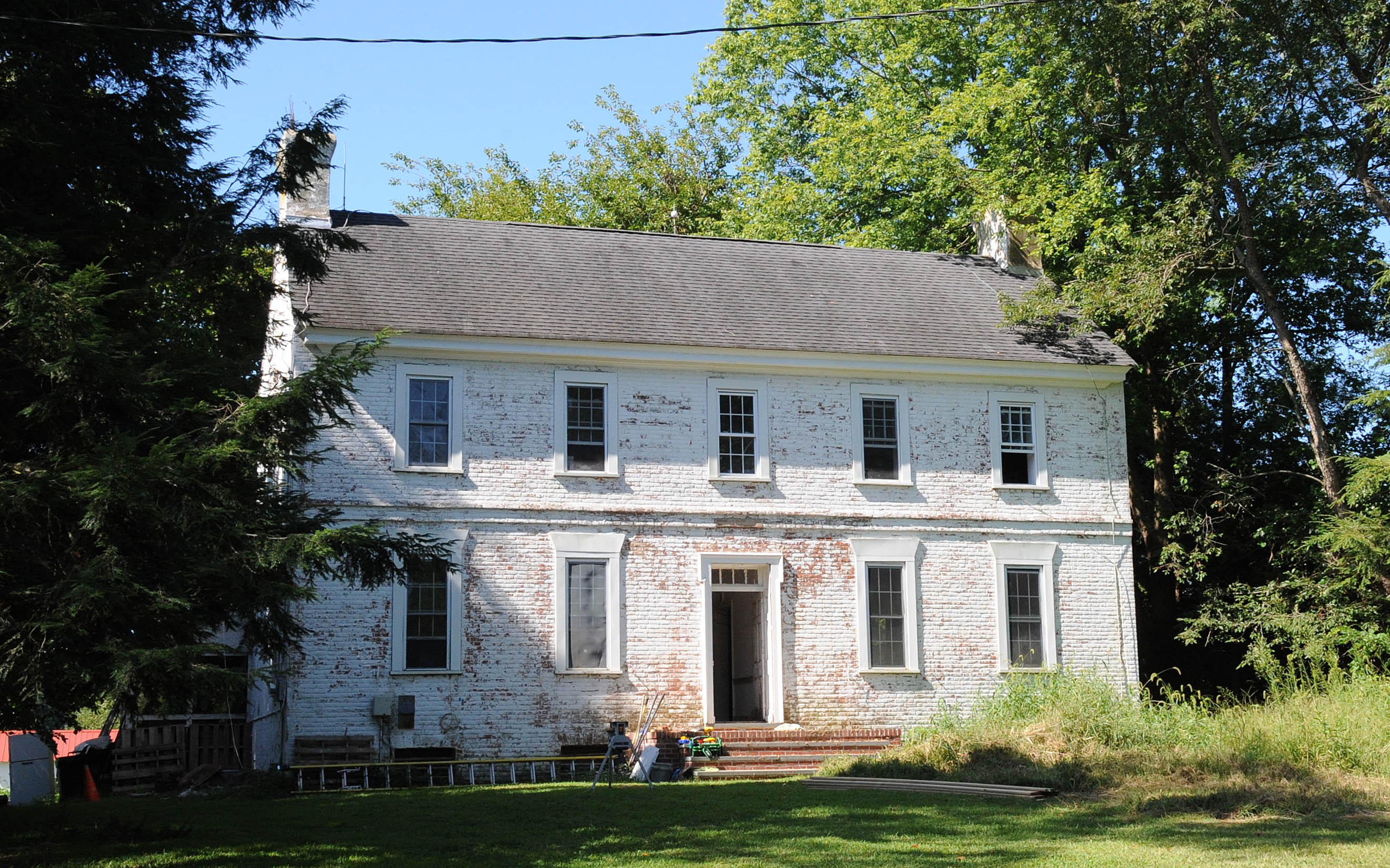

- Location within Delaware Location within the United States
- Location: 2466 7 Hickories Road, Kenton, Delaware
- Coordinates: 39.212717°N 75.622856°W
- Area: 4.6 acres (1.9 ha)
- MPS: Kenton Hundred MRA
- NRHP reference No.: 83001367
- Added to NRHP: June 27, 1983

T. H. Denny House, also known as "Mount Pinder," is a historic home and farm located at Kenton, Kent County, Delaware. The house dates to the last quarter of the 18th century, and is a two-story, five-bay, center hall plan brick dwelling. It has a gable roof and the front facade features an entrance portico added in the mid-19th century. It has a rear wing also added in the mid-19th century. Also on the property are a contributing barn, stable, and machine shed.

It was listed on the National Register of Historic Places in 1983.
