= Poinsett House =

Historic house in Delaware, United States

- U.S. National Register of Historic Places
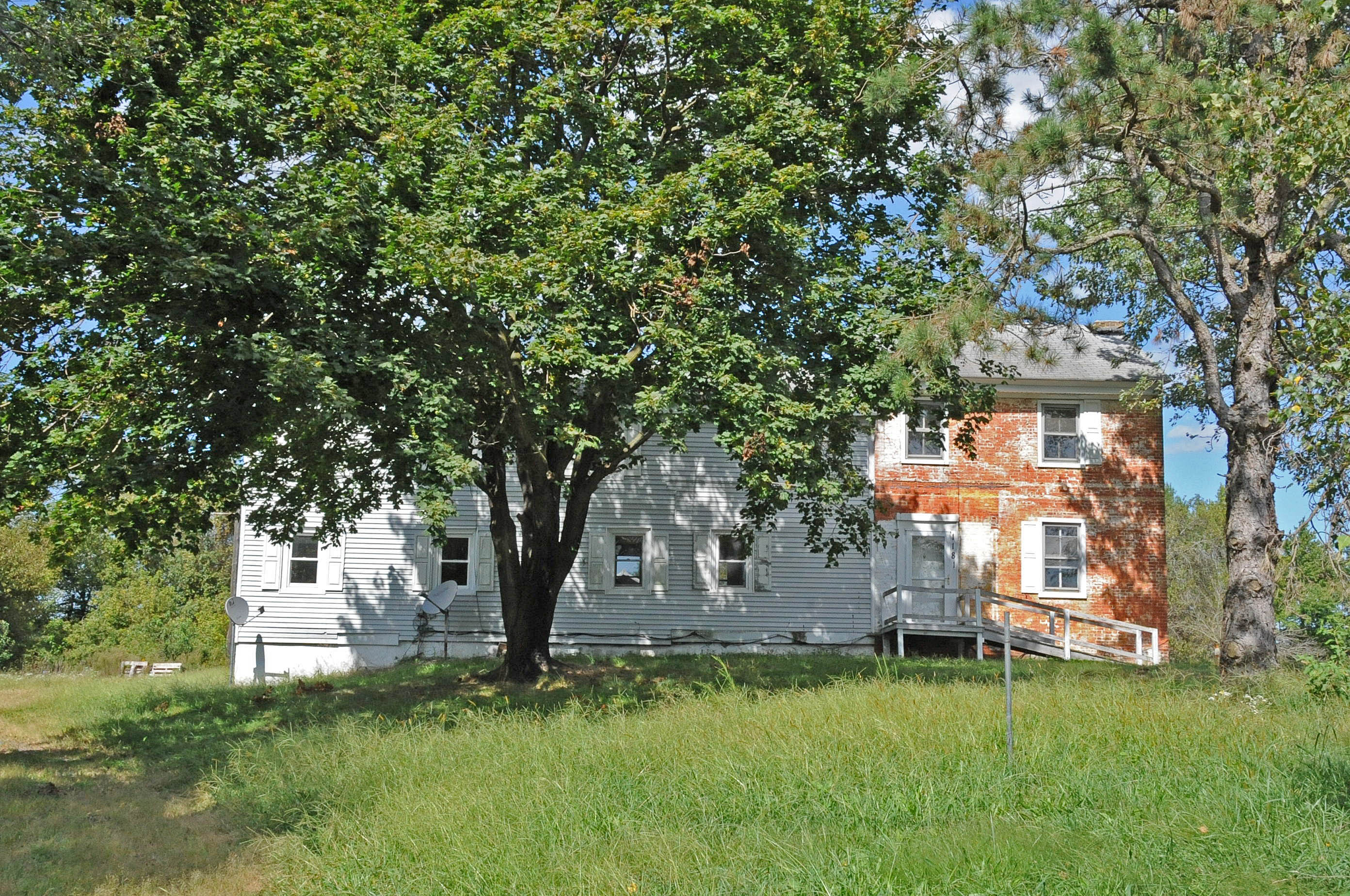

- Location within Delaware Location within the United States
- Location: Delaware Route 6, Kenton, Delaware
- Coordinates: 39°15′46″N 75°44′34″W
- Area: 34.4 acres (13.9 ha)
- MPS: Kenton Hundred MRA
- NRHP reference No.: 83001350
- Added to NRHP: June 27, 1983

Poinsett House is a historic home located at Kenton, Kent County, Delaware. The house was built in the mid-18th century as a tenant house. The original section is a two-story, two-bay, one-room plan brick structure measuring 20 feet by 18 feet. Attached to it are two log wings added in the early 19th century. The addition of the one-room, two-story log wing immediately to the west of the core effectively converted the house into a hall-parlor-type, four-bay dwelling.

It was listed on the National Register of Historic Places in 1983.
