= Kenton Historic District =

Historic district in Delaware, United States

- U.S. National Register of Historic Places
- U.S. Historic district
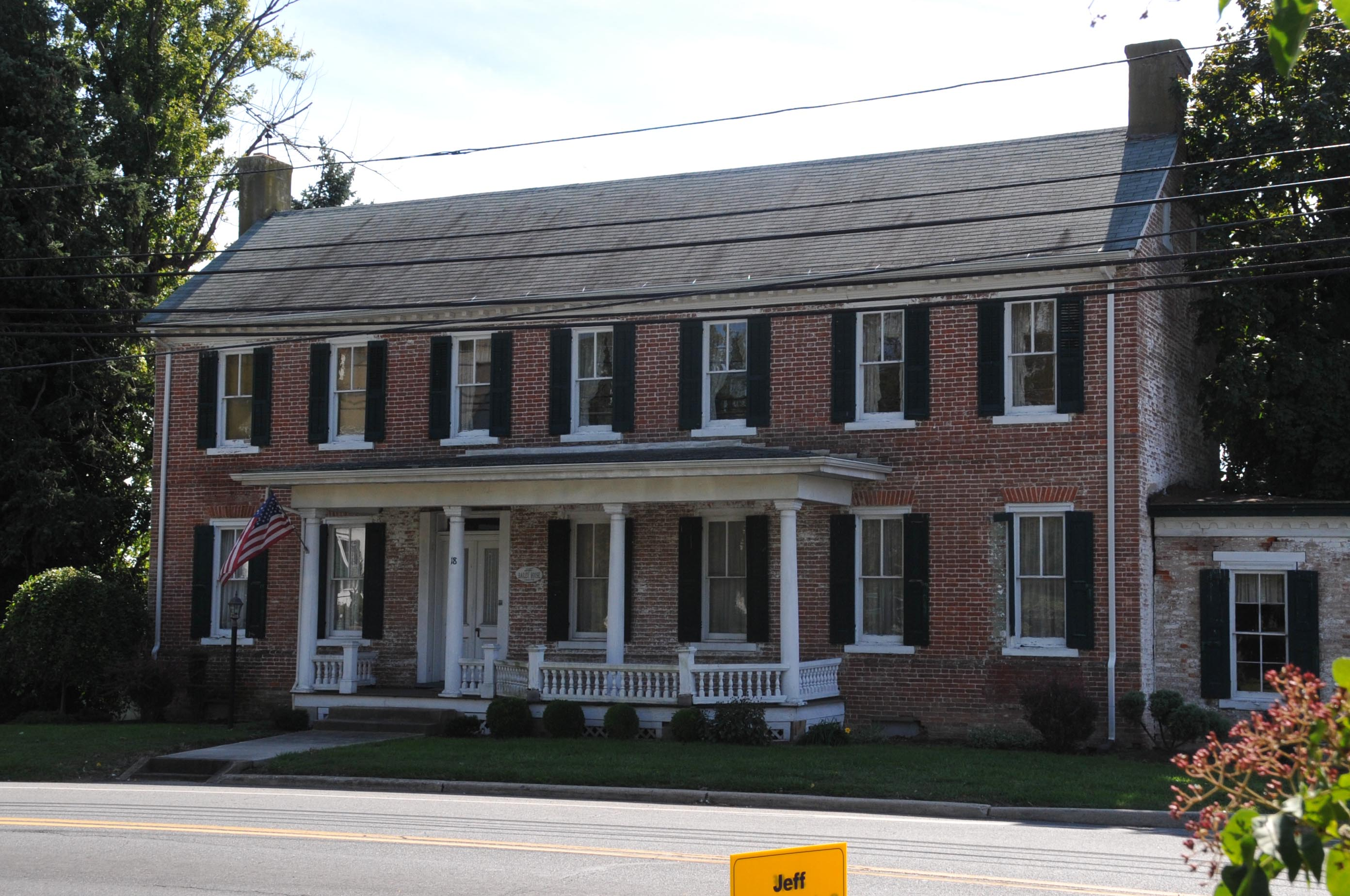
- Wilds-Prettyman House, Kenton Historic District, September 2012

- Location within Delaware Location within the United States
- Location: Commerce St., Kenton, Delaware
- Coordinates: 39°13′36″N 75°39′13″W
- Area: 9.2 acres (3.7 ha)
- Architectural style: Queen Anne
- MPS: Kenton Hundred MRA
- NRHP reference No.: 83001396
- Added to NRHP: August 29, 1983

The Kenton Historic District is a national historic district located at Kenton, Kent County, Delaware. It encompasses 28 contributing buildings in the crossroads community of Kenton. Except for a few houses that date from the early settlement of the crossroads at the end of the 18th century, most of the buildings in the district date from the last half of the 19th century and more specifically from the 1870s and 1880s. The oldest buildings are the Wilds-Prettyman House (c. 1795) and the Wilds-Cooper House (c. 1780). Other notable buildings include the Kenton Methodist Church (1876), Brick Lodge, Thomas Lamb House (c. 1850), Guessford House (c. 1850), and Queen Anne style "Spindle and Spool" House.

It was listed on the National Register of Historic Places in 1983.
