= Clark–Pratt House =

Historic house in Delaware, United States

- U.S. National Register of Historic Places
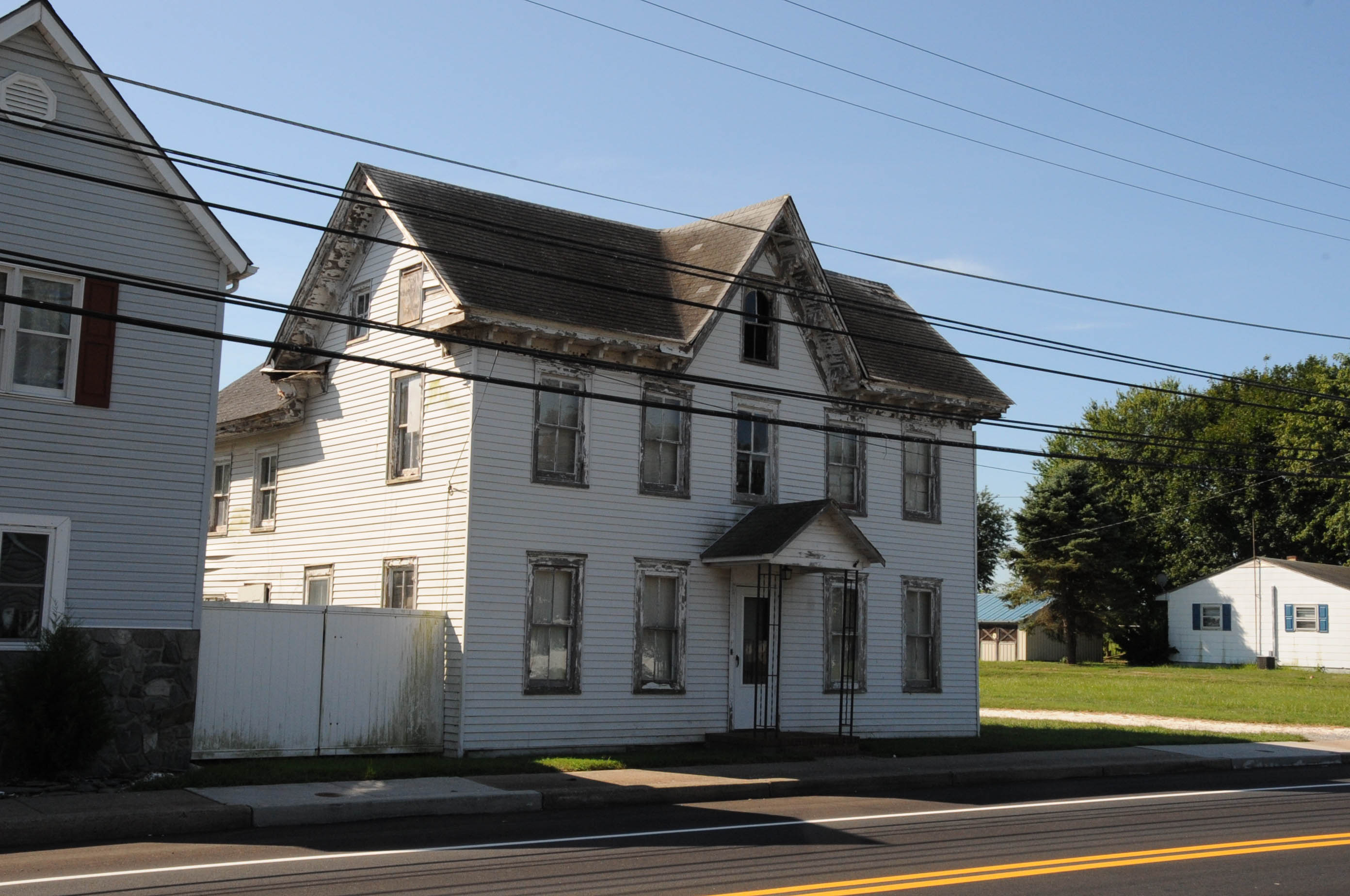

- Location within Delaware Location within the United States
- Location: 118 Main Street, Kenton, Delaware
- Coordinates: 39°13′35″N 75°39′56″W
- Area: 1 acre (0.40 ha)
- Built: c. 1880
- Architectural style: Gothic, Italianate
- MPS: Kenton Hundred MRA
- NRHP reference No.: 83001365
- Added to NRHP: June 27, 1983

Clark–Pratt House is a historic home located in Kenton, Delaware, United States. The house was built about 1880 and is a two-story, five-bay, center hall frame dwelling in a combined Italianate and Gothic Revival style. It is sided in weatherboard and has a gable roof with cross-gable. Also on the property are a contributing summer kitchen, privy and small barn or carriage house.

It was listed on the National Register of Historic Places in 1983.
