= J. F. Betz House =

Historic house in Delaware, United States

- U.S. National Register of Historic Places
- Location within Delaware Location within the United States
- Location: Delaware Route 6, Kenton, Delaware
- Coordinates: 39°17′02″N 75°40′29″W
- Area: 40 acres (16 ha)
- Built: c. 1875
- Built by: Stevens, William A.
- Architectural style: Greek Revival, Gothic, Queen Anne
- MPS: Kenton Hundred MRA
- NRHP reference No.: 83001362
- Added to NRHP: August 29, 1983

J. F. Betz House is a historic home located near Kenton in Kent County, Delaware. The house was built about 1875, and is a two-story, three-bay, double pile dwelling with Greek Revival / Gothic Revival / Queen Anne influences. It has a gable roof with cornice, pierced by a central cross gable. The property includes a contributing 19th century granary and barn.

It was listed on the National Register of Historic Places in 1983.
