= Hoffecker-Lockwood House =

Historic house in Delaware, United States

- U.S. National Register of Historic Places
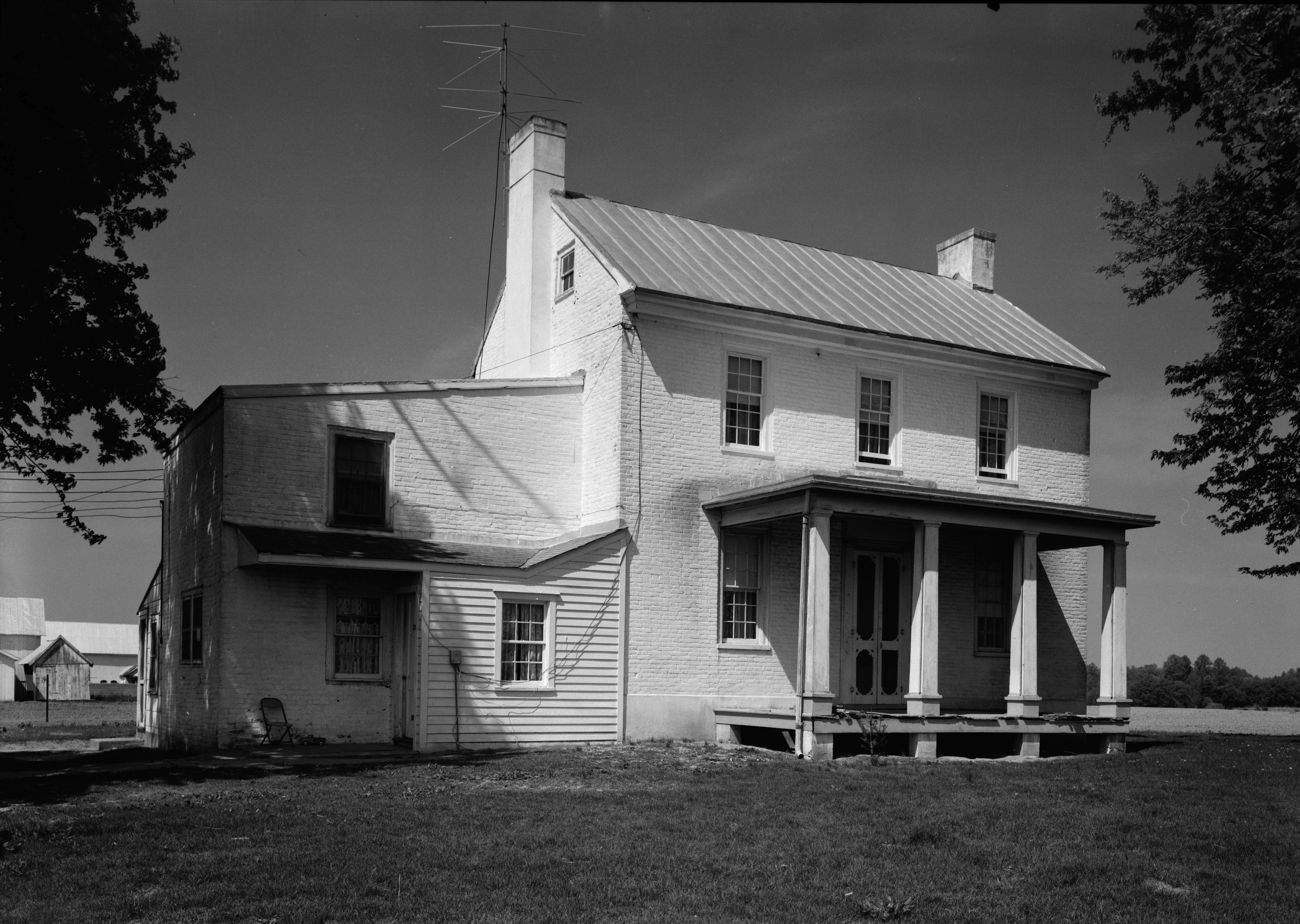
- Hoffecker-Lockwood House, HABS Photo, June 1960

- Location within Delaware Location within the United States
- Location: Delaware Route 6, Kenton, Delaware
- Coordinates: 39°13′36″N 75°35′53″W
- Area: 2 acres (0.81 ha)
- Architectural style: Georgian
- MPS: Kenton Hundred MRA
- NRHP reference No.: 83001372
- Added to NRHP: June 27, 1983

Hoffecker-Lockwood House, also known as "Bellevue," was a historic home located at Kenton, Kent County, Delaware. The house dated to the mid-18th century, and was a two-story, three-bay, hall-and-parlor plan brick dwelling. Attached was a low, two-story, west gable brick wing built part of the original structure and served as a service wing. The interior featured Georgian-style paneling. Also on the property were a contributing kitchen, smokehouse, barn and stable.

It was listed on the National Register of Historic Places in 1983. It was demolished before 1992.
