= Cooper House (Kenton, Delaware) =

Historic house in Delaware, United States

- U.S. National Register of Historic Places
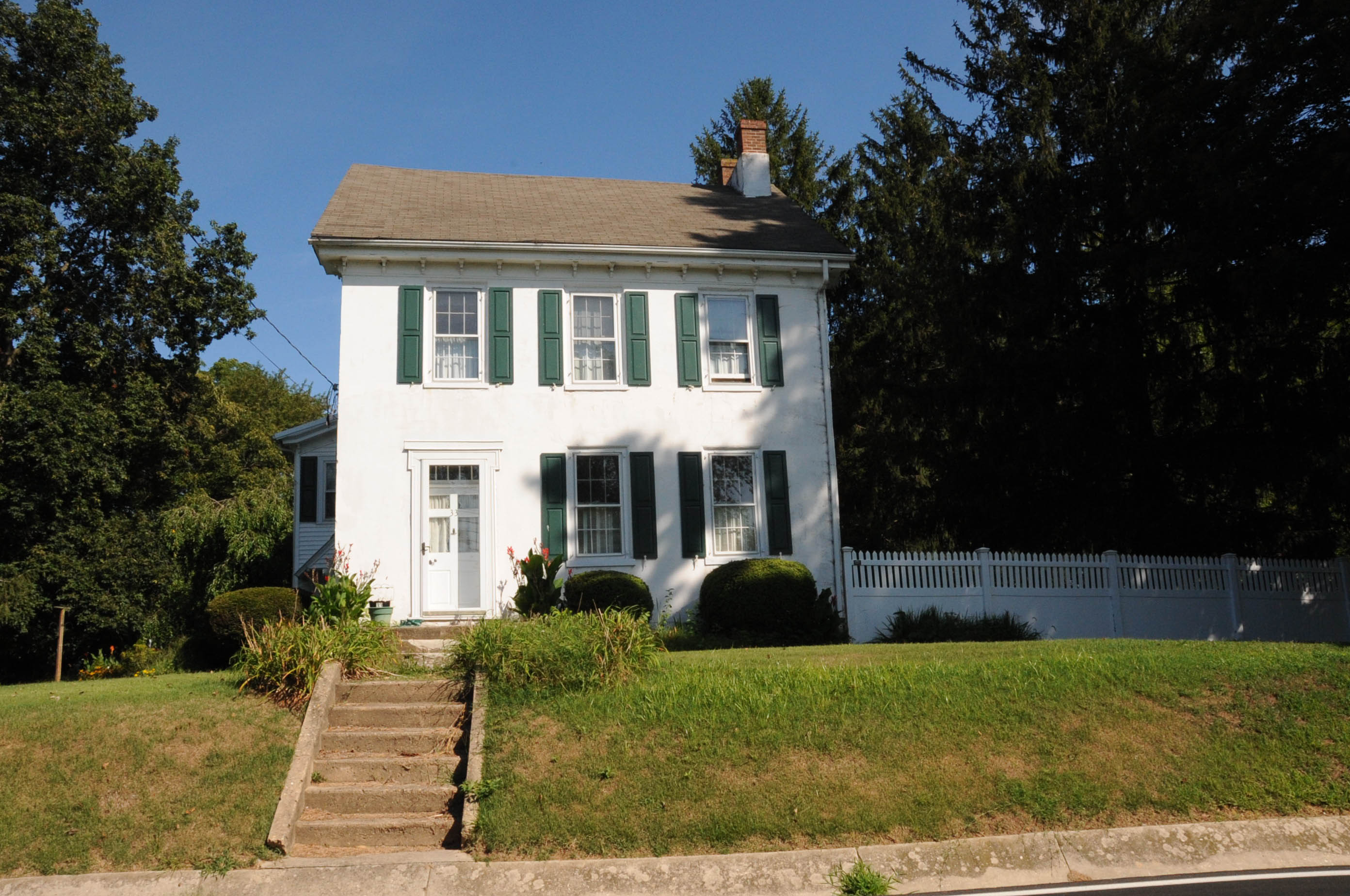

- Location within Delaware Location within the United States
- Location: 33 Main Street, Kenton, Delaware 19955
- Coordinates: 39°13′40″N 75°39′48″W
- Area: 1 acre (0.40 ha)
- Built: c. 1794
- NRHP reference No.: 73000495
- Added to NRHP: March 20, 1973

Cooper House, also known as Wilds House, is a historic home located at Kenton, Kent County, Delaware, United States. The house was built about 1794, as a two-story, three-bay, side hall plan stuccoed brick structure. A two-story rear wing was added in the latter half of the 19th century. Fugitive slaves on the Underground Railroad were harbored in a secret room over the kitchen.

It was listed on the National Register of Historic Places in 1973.

== See also ==
- National Register of Historic Places listings in Kent County, Delaware
