= Delaplane McDaniel House =

Historic house in Delaware, United States

- Delaplaine McDaniel House
- U.S. National Register of Historic Places
- Location within Delaware Location within the United States
- Location: Road 92, Kenton, Delaware
- Coordinates: 39°13′36″N 75°35′53″W
- Area: 91.8 acres (37.2 ha)
- Built: 1880
- Architectural style: Mixed (more Than 2 Styles From Different Periods)
- MPS: Kenton Hundred MRA
- NRHP reference No.: 83001379
- Added to NRHP: June 27, 1983

Delaplaine McDaniel House was a historic home and farm located at Kenton, Kent County, Delaware. The house was built about 1880, and was a two-story, three-bay, center hall plan stuccoed brick dwelling with a gable roof. Attached to each gable end were one-story flat-roofed wings. The front facade features en elaborate entrance reflective of a mix of architectural styles. Also previously on the property were a frame tenant house with attached summer kitchen, servant's quarters dwelling, a large two-story barn, and a variety of agricultural outbuildings. It was owned by Philadelphia merchant Delaplaine McDaniel, 1817-1885. The historic house and farm were demolished sometime between 2017 and April 2020 to expand the adjacent crop field.

It was listed on the National Register of Historic Places in 1983.
