= Green Mansion House (Kenton, Delaware) =

Historic house in Delaware, United States

- U.S. National Register of Historic Places
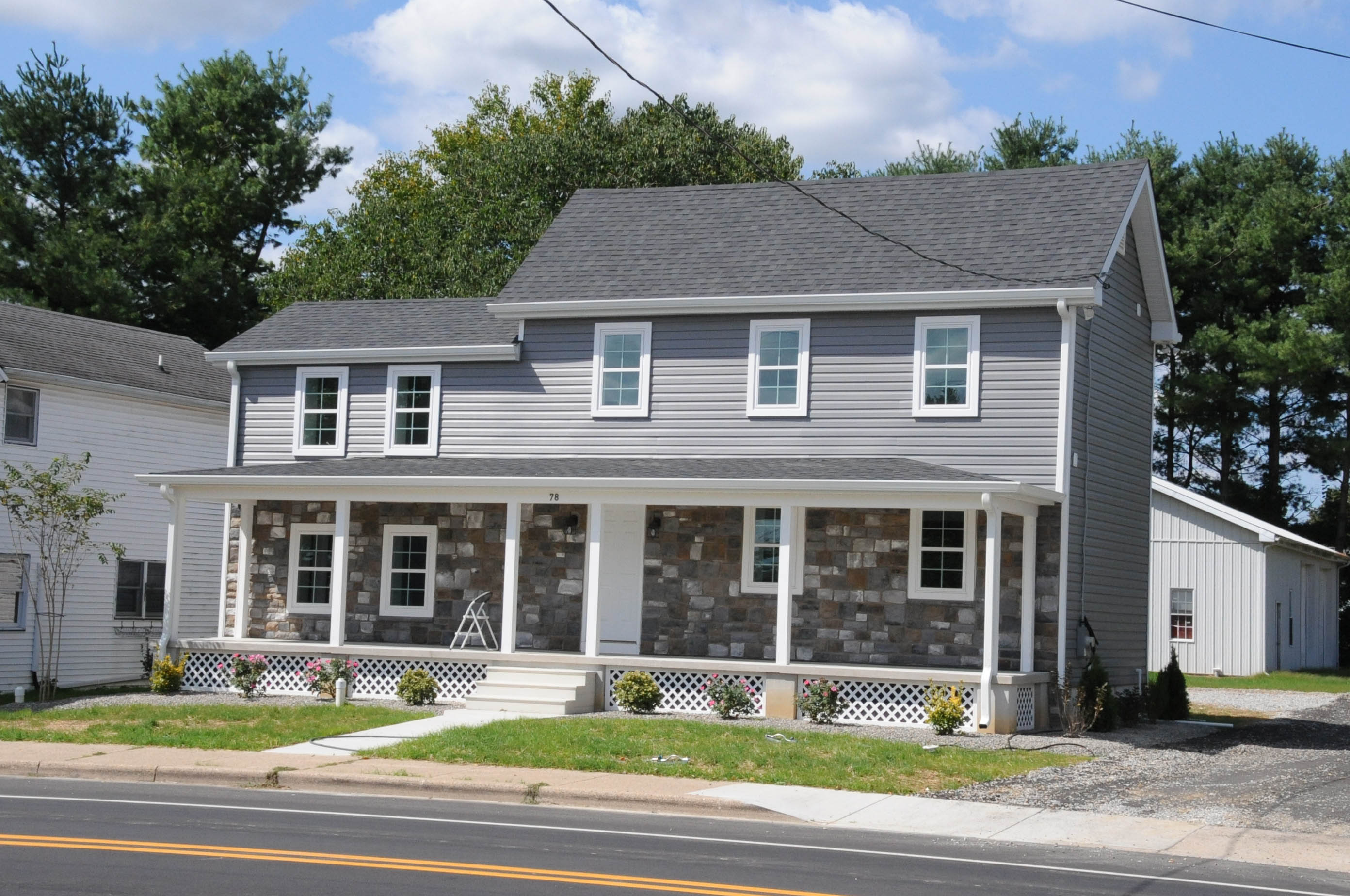

- Location within Delaware Location within the United States
- Location: Main Street, Kenton, Delaware
- Coordinates: 39°13′37″N 75°40′37″W
- Area: 0.3 acres (0.12 ha)
- MPS: Kenton Hundred MRA
- NRHP reference No.: 83001369
- Added to NRHP: June 27, 1983

Green Mansion House is a historic home located at Kenton, Kent County, Delaware. The house dates to the first quarter of the 19th century, and consists of two sections. The frame section is a two-story, three-bay, center hall plan structure. Attached to it is a two-story, two-bay stuccoed brick wing. The house was built as part of Philip Lewis' plan for the development of Kenton.

It was listed on the National Register of Historic Places in 1983.
