= Wright-Carry House =

Historic house in Delaware, US

- U.S. National Register of Historic Places
- Location within Delaware Location within the United States
- Location: Commerce St., Kenton, Delaware
- Coordinates: 39°13′35″N 75°39′56″W
- Area: 0.4 acres (0.16 ha)
- Built: c. 1880
- Architectural style: Queen Anne
- MPS: Kenton Hundred MRA
- NRHP reference No.: 83001383
- Added to NRHP: June 27, 1983

Wright-Carry House is a historic home located at Kenton, Delaware, United States. The house was built about 1880, and is a two-story, three-bay, center hall plan frame structure with a two-story rear wing. Both sections have gable roof and the house exhibits Queen Anne style design elements. Also on the property are a contributing summer kitchen, privy, and barn or carriage house.

It was listed on the National Register of Historic Places in 1983.
