= Thomas Lamb House =

Historic house in Delaware, United States

- U.S. National Register of Historic Places
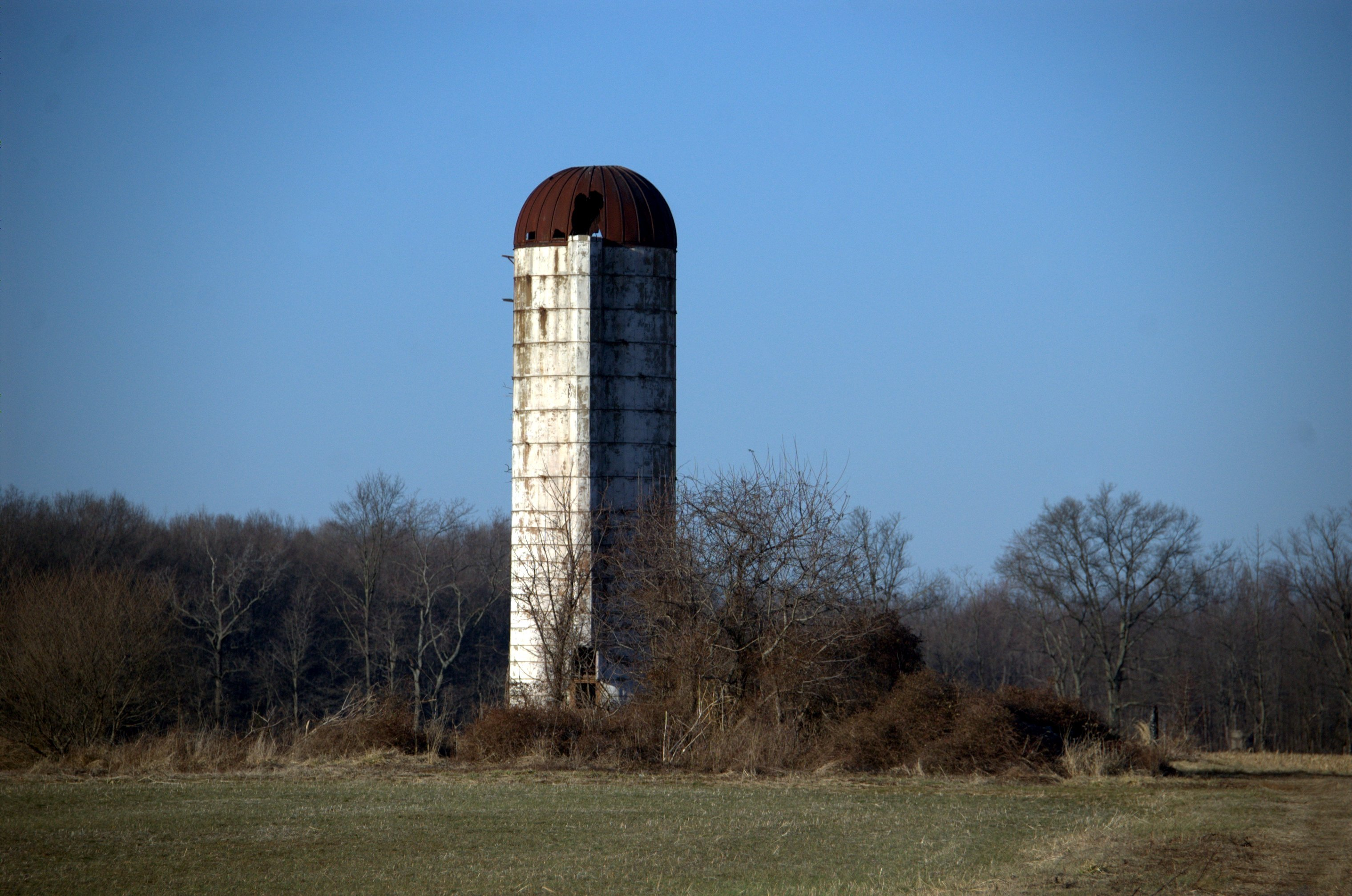
- A silo at the house site.

- Location within Delaware Location within the United States
- Location: Roads 129 and 130; Kenton, Delaware
- Coordinates: 39°16′53″N 75°42′26″W
- Area: 2.7 acres (1.1 ha)
- Built: c. 1855
- Architectural style: Greek Revival, Other, Influence
- MPS: Kenton Hundred MRA
- NRHP reference No.: 83001385
- Added to NRHP: August 29, 1983

Thomas Lamb House, also known as "My Home," is a historic home located at Kenton, Kent County, Delaware. The house dates to about 1855, and is a two-story, three-bay, side hall plan frame dwelling in the Greek Revival style. It has a long and low rear wing with a porch. Both sections have gable roofs. Also on the property are a contributing barn with stable, a frame milk house, and a privy.

It was listed on the National Register of Historic Places in 1983. The house was demolished between 1992 and 2002, and the milk house between 2002 and 2006.
