= N. C. Downs House =

Historic house in Delaware, United States

- U.S. National Register of Historic Places
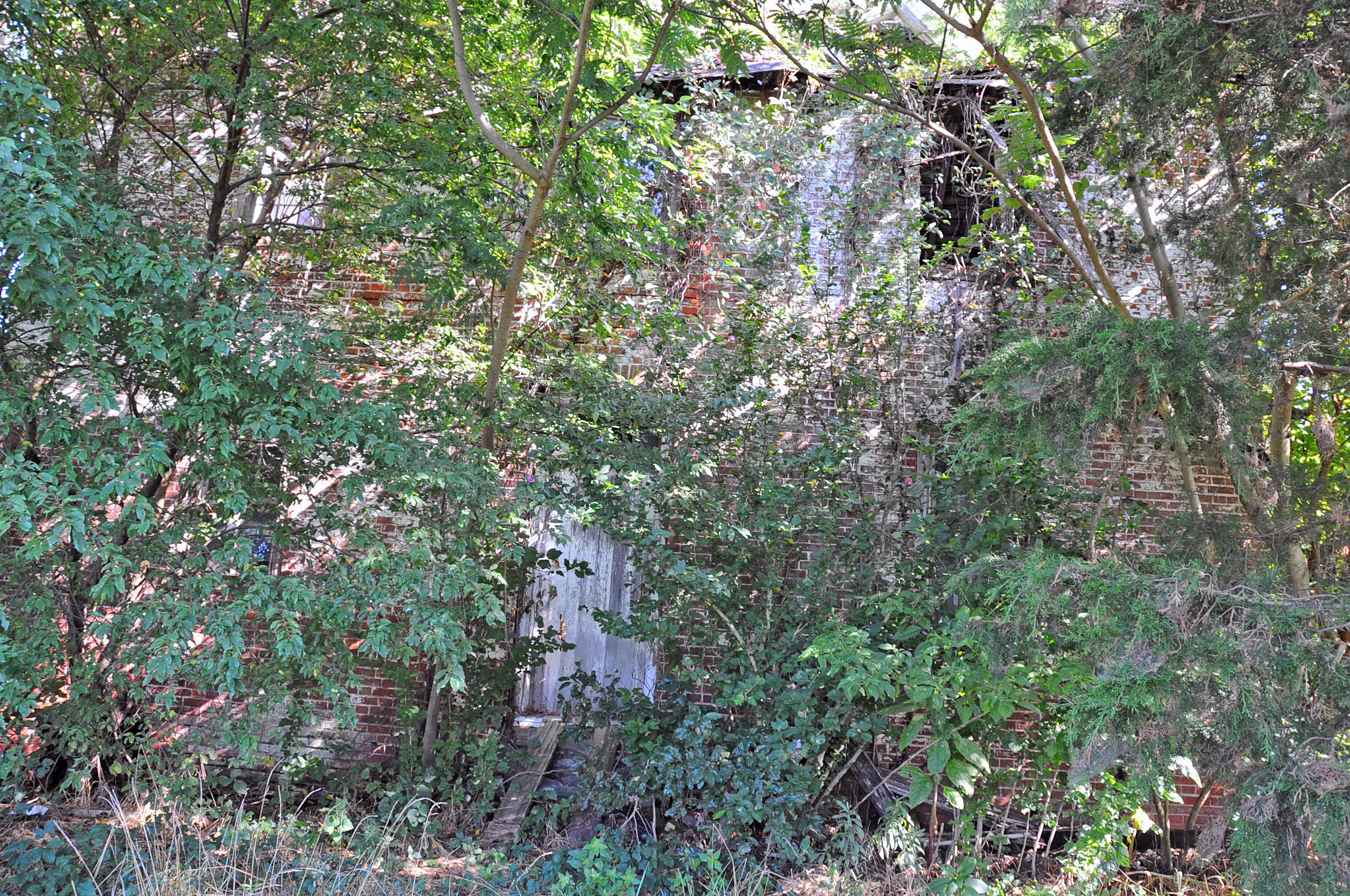

- Location within Delaware Location within the United States
- Location: Road 141, Kenton, Delaware
- Coordinates: 39°14′04″N 75°42′03″W
- Area: 51.65 acres (20.90 ha)
- Built: c. 1820
- MPS: Kenton Hundred MRA
- NRHP reference No.: 83001368
- Added to NRHP: June 27, 1983

N. C. Downs House is a historic house located along Road 141 in Kenton, Kent County, Delaware.

== Description and history ==
The house was built around 1820, and is a two-story, three-bay, brick dwelling. It has a gable roof and corbelled brick cornice. It has a 1 1/2-story, three-bay, wood-framed wing on the west gable end and a small one-story wing attached. The facade is laid in Flemish bond, while the other three walls are done in seven-course common bond.

It was listed on the National Register of Historic Places on June 27, 1983.
