= Kenton Post Office =

- U.S. National Register of Historic Places
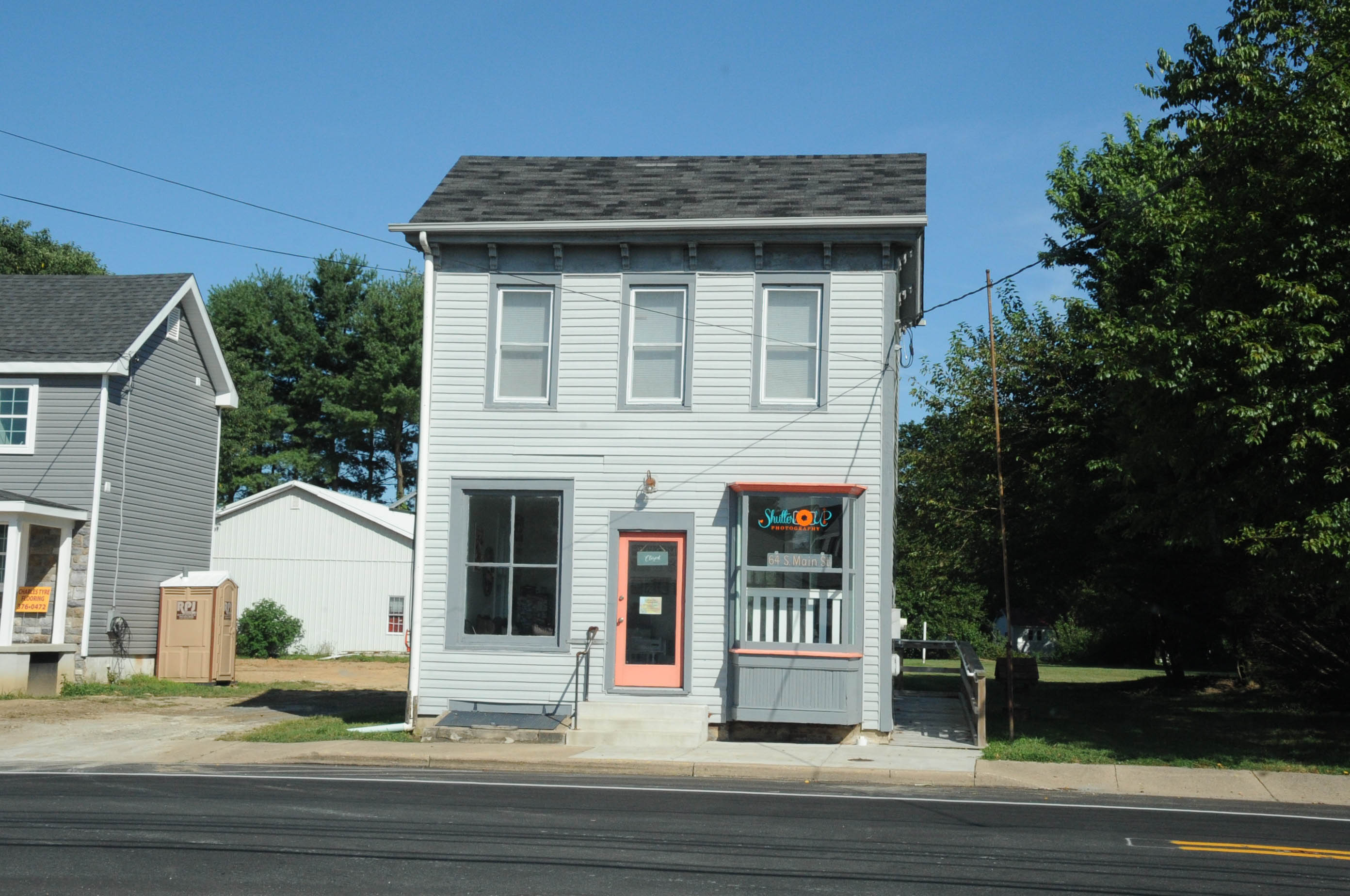

- Location within Delaware Location within the United States
- Interactive map showing the location of Kenton Post Office
- Location: 64 Main Street, Kenton, Delaware 19955
- Coordinates: 39°13′38″N 75°39′54″W
- Area: 0.2 acres (0.081 ha)
- Built: 1881
- Architectural style: Italianate
- MPS: Kenton Hundred MRA
- NRHP reference No.: 83001376
- Added to NRHP: June 27, 1983

The Kenton Post Office is a historic post office building on Maine Street in Kenton, Delaware. It is a two-story Italianate building that was built in 1881 by Francis Greenwell. It was leased out by Greenwell as a store, with a residence above, until the early 20th century when the post office took over the space.

The building was listed on the National Register of Historic Places in 1983.

== Boundary Description ==
The building is located on the west side of Main Street, south of Commerce Street in the town of Kenton. It is known as parcel No. 33 on Kenton Hundred tax map 44.08.01. The nominated property includes the entire plot of land of 8512 square feet or 0.195 acres.

== Description ==
The Kenton Post Office, constructed in 1881, initially served as a combination of a frame store and a dwelling. This two-story building features a narrow design with three bays and a center hall. It was built in the Italianate architectural style and has retained much of its original appearance throughout the years, with only one notable alteration: the replacement of the original one-bay entrance porch with a full facade pent eave.

The Post Office still showcases its distinctive roof brackets, 2-over-2 windows, and corner boards, which include a rather rustic attempt at cornice moldings at the top. The projecting bay window on the front facade remains in its original form.

In contrast, the two-story rear wing is simpler in design compared to the main block. Both the main block and the rear wing have brick foundations. The roof of the building has a subtle pitch, and while the cornice in the rear wing includes a frieze, it lacks the decorative brackets seen on the main block. Both sections of the building are topped with standing seam tin roofs.

The only additional structure on the property is a small balloon frame storage shed located toward the rear lot line.

== Historical Background ==
As previously noted, the construction of the Kenton Post Office dates back to 1881 and was overseen by Francis Greenwell. In 1881, James Williams formally transferred the title of the property to Francis Greenwell, with the explicit stipulation that the expenses associated with building the structure were to be borne by Greenwell. Evidently, Greenwell embarked on the construction of the store while simultaneously establishing his claim to the land.

Originally, the building served as a small store, which Greenwell leased to shopkeepers. He also owned the adjacent properties on either side of the shop. Interestingly, it wasn't until the early of this century that the Post Office was relocated to this building. To this day, the upper floor continues to be used as a residence.

== Significance ==
At present, the Kenton Post Office serves as the focal point of the town, necessitating regular visits from its residents. More significantly, it stands as a reminder of the economic prosperity that sustained Kenton from the aftermath of the Civil War through the close of the 19th century. Distinguished by its modest proportions and the incorporation of Italianate architectural elements, it stands alone as the town's sole commercial building of its kind. In light of these features, it is being nominated under Criterion C for its exemplary use of the Italianate style and under Criterion A for its historical connection to Kenton's once-thriving commercial sector.

== See also ==
- National Register of Historic Places listings in Kent County, Delaware
- List of United States post offices
