= Alfred L. Hudson House =

- U.S. National Register of Historic Places
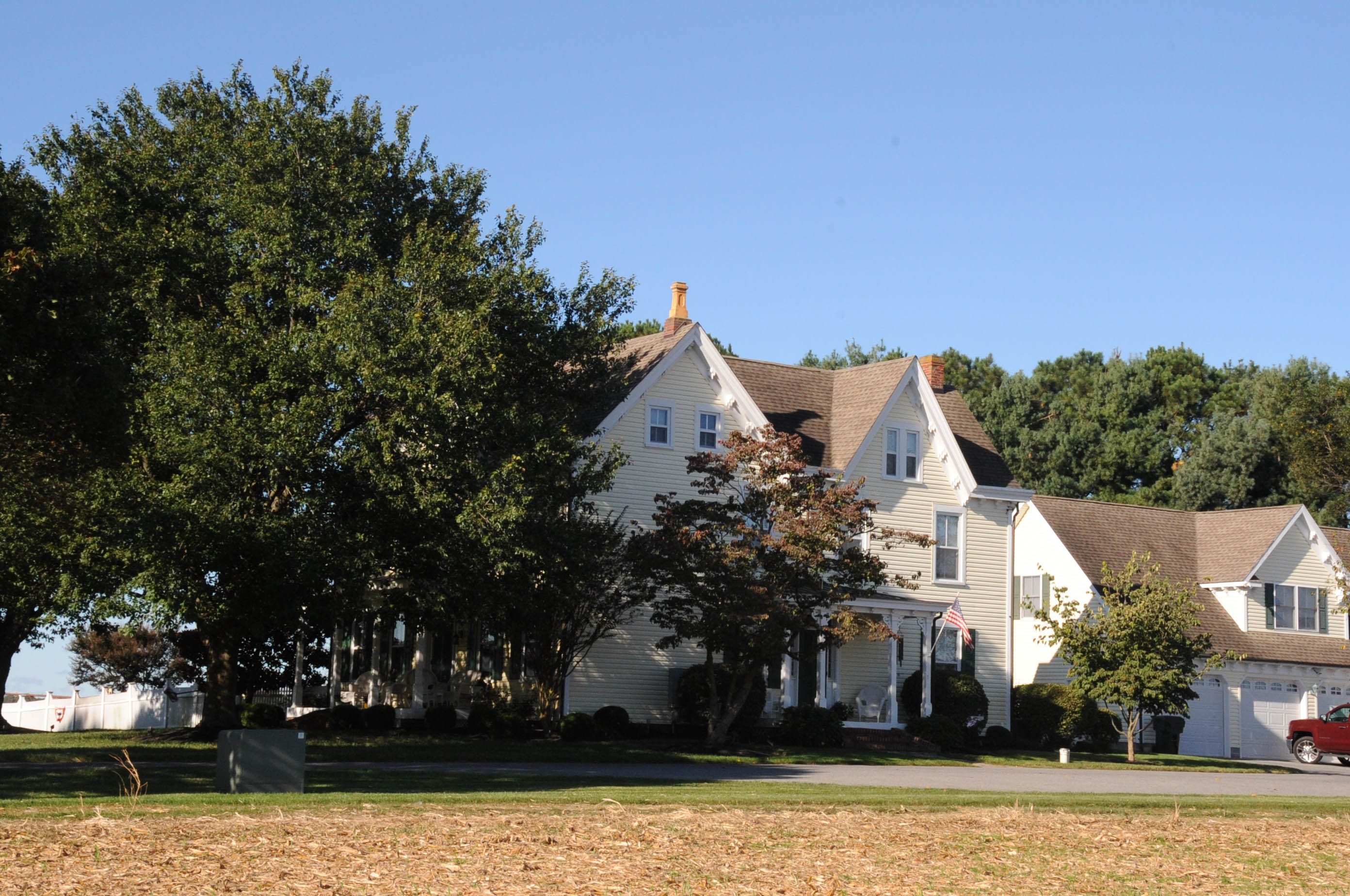
- LATE 19TH CENTURY MAIN HOUSE OF A 45 ACRE FARM BUILT AS A BLEND OF GOTHIC REVIVAL AND QUEEN ANNE STYLES

- Location within Delaware Location within the United States
- Location: Road 90, Kenton, Delaware
- Coordinates: 39°16′10″N 75°37′24″W
- Area: 45.9 acres (18.6 ha)
- Built: 1880
- Architectural style: Queen Anne, Gothic Revival
- MPS: Kenton Hundred MRA
- NRHP reference No.: 83001373
- Added to NRHP: June 27, 1983

Alfred L. Hudson House is a historic home and farm located at Kenton, Kent County, Delaware. The house dates to about 1880, and is a two-story, five-bay, center hall plan frame dwelling in a blended Queen Anne / Gothic Revival style. It has a cross gable roof and a bracketed heavy roof cornice. Also on the property are a contributing large gambrel-roofed barn, 2 1/2-story granary, chicken house, a milk house, machine shed and garage.

It was listed on the National Register of Historic Places in 1983.
