= W. D. Burrows House =

Historic home in Delaware, US

- U.S. National Register of Historic Places
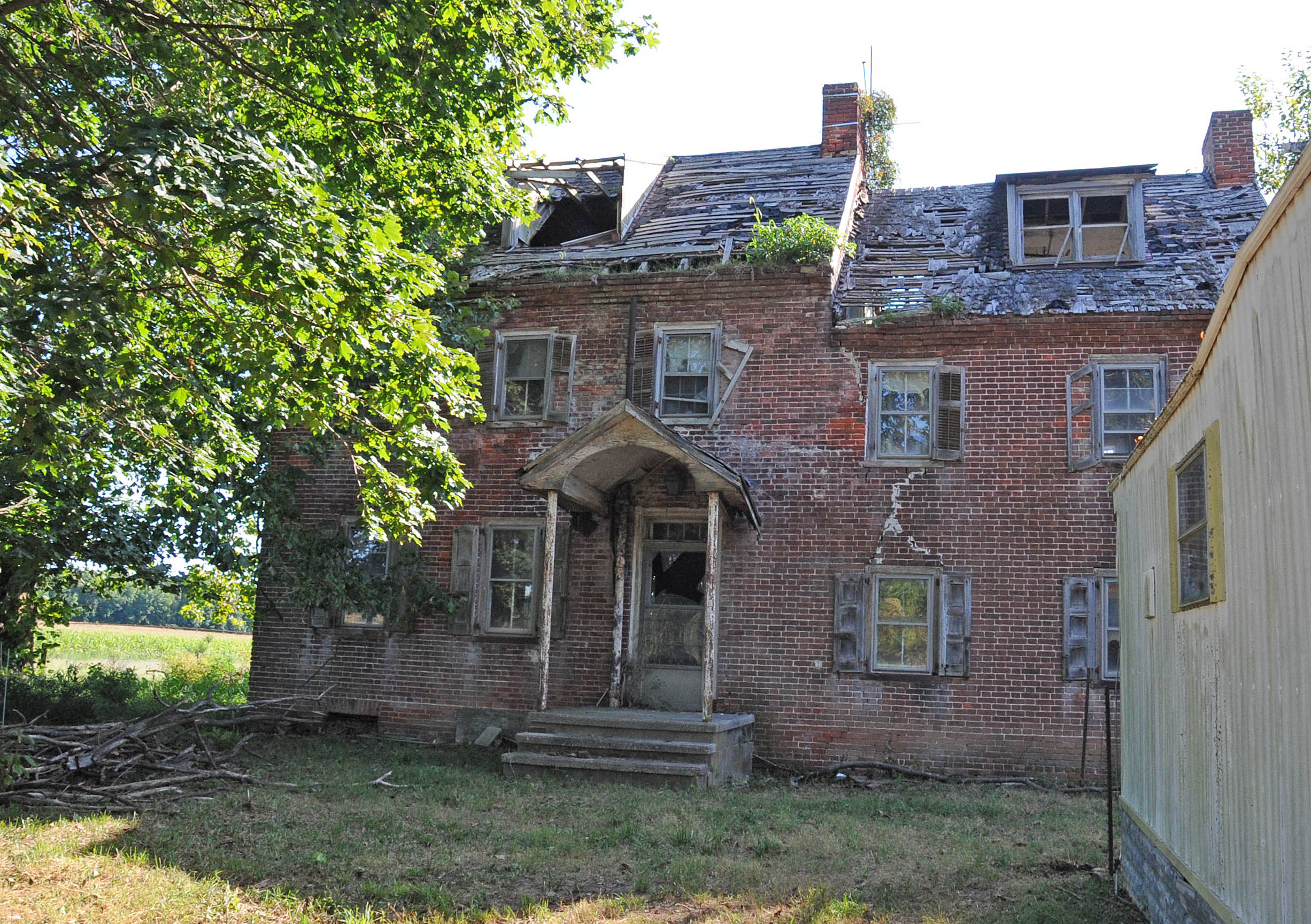

- Location within Delaware Location within the United States
- Location: Delaware Route 42, Kenton, Delaware
- Coordinates: 39°14′10″N 75°40′30″W
- Area: 23 acres (9.3 ha)
- Built: c. 1830
- MPS: Kenton Hundred MRA
- NRHP reference No.: 83001364
- Added to NRHP: June 27, 1983

W. D. Burrows House, also known as Hopewell, is a historic home and farm located near Kenton in Kent County, Delaware. The house was built about 1830, and is a two-story, five-bay, center hall plan brick dwelling. It has a full basement and gable roof. Also on the property are a contributing barn, a machine shed, chicken house and assorted storage sheds. They are dated to the late-19th and early-20th centuries.

It was listed on the National Register of Historic Places in 1983.
