= Thomas Attix House =

- U.S. National Register of Historic Places
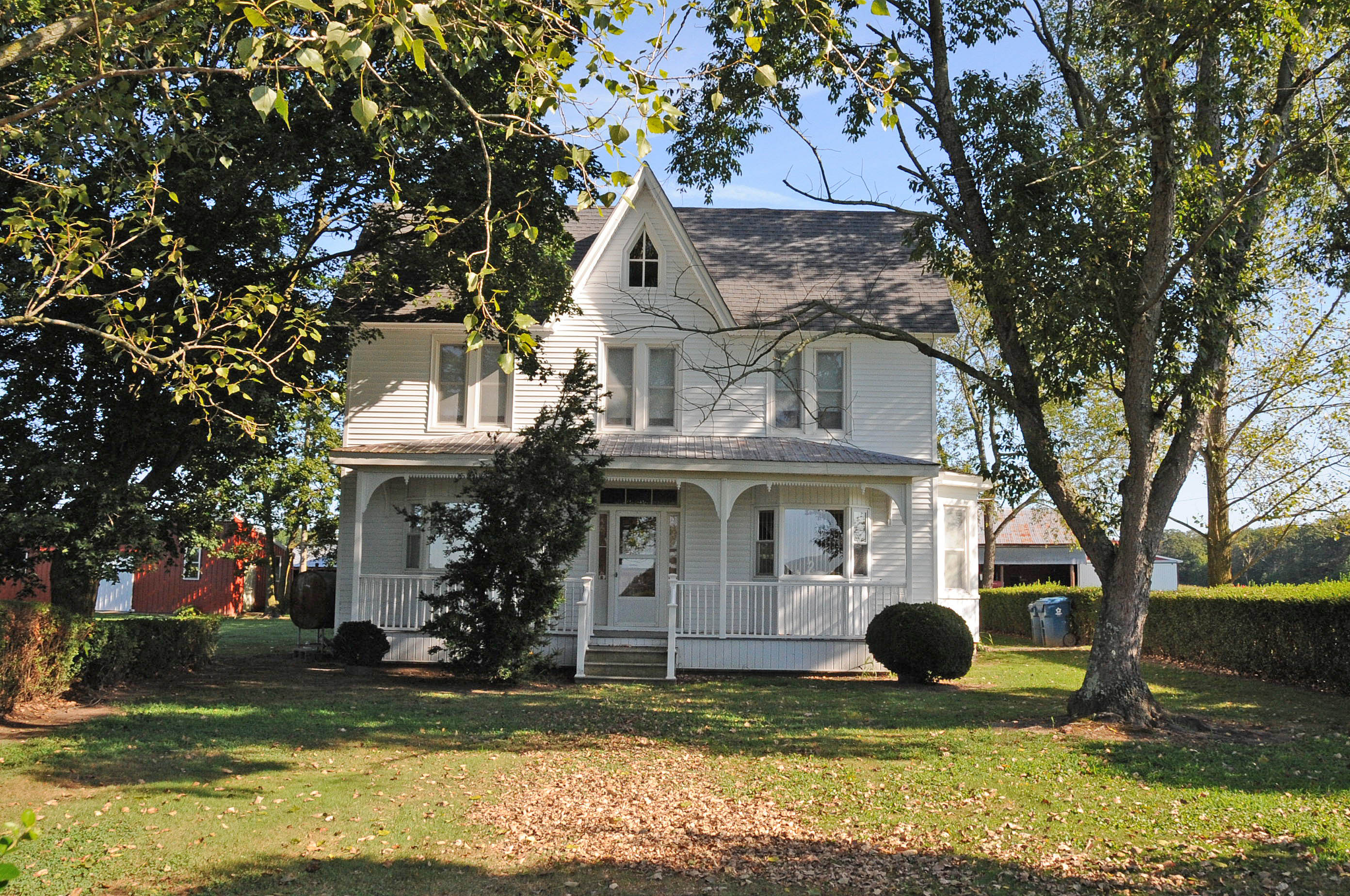

- Location within Delaware Location within the United States
- Location: Road 140, Kenton, Delaware
- Coordinates: 39°13′31″N 75°42′28″W
- Area: 22.6 acres (9.1 ha)
- Built: c. 1880
- Architectural style: Eclectic
- MPS: Kenton Hundred MRA
- NRHP reference No.: 83001361
- Added to NRHP: June 27, 1983

Thomas Attix House is a historic home and farm complex located near Kenton in Kent County, Delaware. The house was built in about 1880, and is a two-story, three-bay, frame dwelling with a rear wing in a Gothic Revival / Queen Anne style. Contributing outbuildings include a brick milk house, sawn-plank bull pen, frame barn, cattle sheds, and machine shed. They date to the 19th and early-20th centuries.

It was listed on the National Register of Historic Places in 1983.
