= George Arnold House =

- U.S. National Register of Historic Places
- Location within Delaware Location within the United States
- Location: 7 Hickories Road, Kenton, Delaware
- Coordinates: 39.222648°N 75.655296°W
- Area: 23 acres (9.3 ha)
- Built: c. 1830
- Architectural style: Greek Revival
- MPS: Kenton Hundred MRA
- NRHP reference No.: 83001360
- Added to NRHP: June 27, 1983

George Arnold House was a historic home and farm complex located near Kenton, Kent County, Delaware. The house was built the 1830s, and was a two-story, three-bay, side-plan dwelling with a rear wing in the Greek Revival style. Contributing outbuildings included frame chicken houses, sheds and corn cribs, milk house, and a bank barn. They dated to the late-19th and early-20th centuries.

It was listed on the National Register of Historic Places in 1983. The house was demolished in the spring of 2001 and the outbuildings were removed before 2006.
