= Robert Hill House =

Historic house in Delaware, United States

- U.S. National Register of Historic Places
- Location within Delaware Location within the United States
- Location: Delaware Route 6, Kenton, Delaware
- Coordinates: 39°16′33″N 75°41′21″W
- Area: 2.2 acres (0.89 ha)
- Built: c. 1790
- Architectural style: Federal
- MPS: Kenton Hundred MRA
- NRHP reference No.: 83001371
- Added to NRHP: August 29, 1983

Robert Hill House, also known as "Alley," was a historic home located at Kenton, Kent County, Delaware. The house dated to the last decade of the 18th century, and was a two-story, three-bay, side hall plan brick dwelling in the Federal style. It had a gable roof and the front facade features a simple entrance portico. The rear wing was extended in the late-19th century with the addition of a frame wing.

It was listed on the National Register of Historic Places in 1983. The house was demolished between 2009 and 2011.
