= Mario Alberto Peña =

Mexican suspected criminal and high-ranking member of the Gulf Cartel

- Born: 22 October 1980; Rio Grande City, Texas, United States
- Died: 13 March 2013 (aged 32); Camargo, Tamaulipas, Mexico
- Cause of death: Gunshot wounds
- Other names: Popo; Comandante Popo
- Employer: Gulf Cartel (suspected)
- Height: 5 ft 10 in (1.78 m)

Mario Alberto "Popo" Peña (22 October 1980 – 19 March 2013) was a US-born Mexican suspected criminal and high-ranking member of the Gulf Cartel, a criminal group based in Tamaulipas, Mexico. He started his criminal career in a local Texan gang before joining the Gulf Cartel, where he worked as a regional leader in an area known as La Ribereña, across the border from Starr County, Texas. Though born in the US, Peña worked in Mexico and maintained close ties with Texas. Known for his charisma and heavily tattooed body, Peña was viewed as a gangster folk hero by some people in the Tamaulipas–South Texas stretch of the Mexico–United States border. In 2013, he was betrayed and killed by an alleged member of the Gulf Cartel. Several people paid tribute to him online by creating a Facebook page and uploading photos and rap music videos in his memory.

== Early life and career ==
Mario Alberto Peña, known as "Popo" or "Comandante Popo" (English: "Commander Popo"), was born in Rio Grande City, Texas, United States, on 22 October 1980. He grew up in Roma, Texas, and started his criminal career for a local Texan street gang. He eventually joined the Gulf Cartel, a criminal group based in Tamaulipas, Mexico. In the Gulf Cartel, Peña was a regional leader in an area in Tamaulipas known as La Ribereña, which sits across Starr County, Texas. Though born in the U.S., Peña operated primarily in Mexico and maintained ties with the Rio Grande Valley.

On 16 August 2011, Peña and an accomplice, Daniel Bazán, committed a drive-by shooting at a residence in Alto Bonito Heights, Texas. According to eye-witnesses, both men arrived at a property in a vehicle and shot at the place using AR-15 assault rifles and other pistols. The Starr County Sheriff's Office issued a bulletin asking the public to reach out with any information about Peña's whereabouts. The wanted flyer said Peña was approximately 5 ft 10 in (1.78 m) and weighed 210 lb (95 kg). He was described as having brown eyes and hair, a beard and mustache, and tattoos in multiple parts of his body. Deputy Erasmo Rios said they believed Peña was hiding in the Starr County area, but recommended civilians not try to apprehend either him or his accomplice because they were considered armed and dangerous. The warrant against both men was for attempted capital murder. Peña fled to Mexico shortly after he was charged.

== Death and legacy ==
Peña was killed in Comales, a rural community near Camargo, Tamaulipas, on 19 March 2013. According to security forces, Peña was killed as part of an internal strife incident within the Gulf Cartel that dated back to September 2011, when suspected Gulf Cartel leader Samuel Flores Borrego (alias "Metro 3") was killed by members of his own criminal group. Peña was confirmed dead by U.S. federal authorities, when his body was taken to the international crossing by his family members. Mexican authorities also confirmed his death. According to Peña's sister, the family was able to recover the body with the help of another Gulf Cartel regional leader, Juan Francisco Sáenz Támez, alias "Comandante Panochitas" (English: "Commander Pussy"). (Note: Sáenz Támez was arrested in Edinburg, Texas, in 2014 and sentenced to 30 years in prison in 2015 for money laundering and drug trafficking offenses.) Peña was buried in a private ceremony in Texas. His family told the McAllen-based newspaper The Monitor in an interview that Peña died "with honor". When Peña was alive, he was regarded as a charismatic gangster and folk hero on the Tamaulipas–South Texas stretch of the Mexico–United States border.

Since his death, several have paid tribute to him online by creating a Facebook page and uploading photos and multiple rap music videos about him. This furthered Peña's image as some sort of gangster folk hero. Two of the music videos online tell the story of how Peña was killed, and claim that he was betrayed by a former ally. Peña's sister claims that his murderer was suspected Gulf Cartel regional leader known as Eduardo Luna, who shot Peña from behind because he was guarding US$2 million in cash for the Gulf Cartel.

She claimed that after he killed Peña, Luna fled to the U.S., where he was later arrested for another murder and corruption case involving the United States Border Patrol. Peña's sister also claims that she had met Luna in Mexico, and that he killed several others before her brother. She said his alias in the Gulf Cartel was "Comandante Pájaro" (English: "Commander Bird"). Her claims were not independently verified by law enforcement, and she later declined an interview with The Texas Tribune. Luna's defense did not comment on Peña's case.

== See also ==
- Mexican drug war

== Sources ==
=== Bibliography ===
- Deibert, Michael (2014). In the Shadow of Saint Death: The Gulf Cartel and the Price of America's Drug War in Mexico. Rowman & Littlefield. p. 336. ISBN 978-1493010653.
