= David Pope =

David or Dave Pope may refer to:

- Dave Pope (1921–1999), American baseball player
- David Pope (basketball) (1962–2016), American basketball player
- David Pope (cartoonist) (born 1965), Australian editorial cartoonist

== See also ==
- David Pope Anderson (born 1955), American computer research scientist
