= Frankie Pope =

English footballer

Personal information
- Full name: Francis James Pope
- Date of birth: 1884
- Place of birth: Brierley Hill, England
- Date of death: 1953 (aged 68–69)
- Position: Inside forward

Senior career*
Years	Team	Apps	(Gls)
1899–1900	Pensnett Albion		
1900–1901	Cradley Heath		
1900–1902	Wolverhampton Wanderers	5	(1)
1903–1904	Stourbridge		
1905–1906	Wolverhampton Wanderers	8	(3)
1906–1907	Notts County	2	(0)
1907–1908	Walsall		
1908–1909	Stourbridge		
1909	Netherton		
Total		15	(4)
- * Club domestic league appearances and goals

Francis James Pope (1884–1953) was an English footballer who played in the Football League for Notts County and Wolverhampton Wanderers.
