= Kenton, Delaware =

- Town
- Seal

- Location of Kenton in Kent County, Delaware.

- Location within the state of Delaware Kenton (the United States)
- Coordinates: 39°13′39″N 75°39′47″W
- Country: United States
- State: Delaware
- County: Kent

Area
  - Total: 0.18 sq mi (0.46 km^{2})
  - Land: 0.18 sq mi (0.46 km^{2})
  - Water: 0 sq mi (0.00 km^{2})
- Elevation: 59 ft (18 m)

Population (2020)
  - Total: 215
  - Density: 1,220.1/sq mi (471.08/km^{2})
- Time zone: UTC−5 (Eastern (EST))
  - Summer (DST): UTC−4 (EDT)
- ZIP code: 19955
- Area code: 302
- FIPS code: 10-39100
- GNIS feature ID: 214191
- Website: kenton.delaware.gov

Kenton is a town in Kent County, Delaware, United States. It is part of the Dover metropolitan statistical area. The population was 215 in 2020.

== History ==
The Village of Kenton is a crossroads community located at the intersection of Route 42 and Route 300 in Kenton Hundred, Delaware. The village dates from the last decade of the 18th century, but did not achieve its peak until the last half of the 19th century when the Delaware and Maryland Railroad line was put through from Clayton to Maryland.

Kenton was first laid out in 1796 by Philip Lewis who had begun to acquire property in the area five years before in 1791. The community was first known as Georgetown, then as Lewis Crossroads and finally, in 1806, by the name of Kenton.

The Kenton Historic District was listed on the National Register of Historic Places in 1983. Other sites at or near Kenton on the National Register of Historic Places are the: George Arnold House, Aspendale, Thomas Attix House, J. F. Betz House, Benjamin Blackiston House, W. D. Burrows House, Scene of Cheyney Clow's Rebellion, Clark-Pratt House, Cooper House, Thomas Davis House, N. C. Downs House, T.H. Denny House, Green Mansion House (Kenton, Delaware), Robert Hill House, Hoffecker-Lockwood House, Alfred L. Hudson House, Kenton Post Office, Thomas Lamb Farm, Thomas Lamb House, Jefferson Lewis House, Delaplane McDaniel House, Poinsett House, Somerville, William Stevens House, James Williams House, and Wright-Carry House.

== Geography ==
Kenton is located at 39°13′39″N 75°39′47″W.

According to the United States Census Bureau, the town has a total area of 0.2 square miles (0.52 km^{2}), all land.

== Demographics ==
Historical population
Census	Pop.	Note	%±
1880	107		—
1890	241		125.2%
1900	192		−20.3%
1910	209		8.9%
1920	212		1.4%
1930	175		−17.5%
1940	233		33.1%
1950	211		−9.4%
1960	249		18.0%
1970	205		−17.7%
1980	243		18.5%
1990	232		−4.5%
2000	237		2.2%
2010	261		10.1%
2020	215		−17.6%
U.S. Decennial Census

At the 2000 census there were 237 people in 83 households, including 63 families, in the town. The population density was 1,375.8 inhabitants per square mile (531.2/km^{2}). There were 87 housing units at an average density of 505.0 per square mile (195.0/km^{2}). The racial makeup of the town was 94.51% White, 3.38% African American, 1.27% from other races, and 0.84% from two or more races. Hispanic or Latino of any race were 4.64%.

Of the 83 households 36.1% had children under the age of 18 living with them, 59.0% were married couples living together, 9.6% had a female householder with no husband present, and 22.9% were non-families. 14.5% of households were one person and 4.8% were one person aged 65 or older. The average household size was 2.86 and the average family size was 3.11.

The age distribution was 27.8% under the age of 18, 9.3% from 18 to 24, 30.4% from 25 to 44, 24.9% from 45 to 64, and 7.6% 65 or older. The median age was 36 years. For every 100 females, there were 94.3 males. For every 100 females age 18 and over, there were 90.0 males.

The median household income was $38,250 and the median family income was $38,000. Males had a median income of $32,143 versus $27,500 for females. The per capita income for the town was $15,539. About 10.6% of families and 15.4% of the population were below the poverty line, including 19.7% of those under the age of eighteen and none of those sixty five or over.

== Infrastructure ==
=== Transportation ===
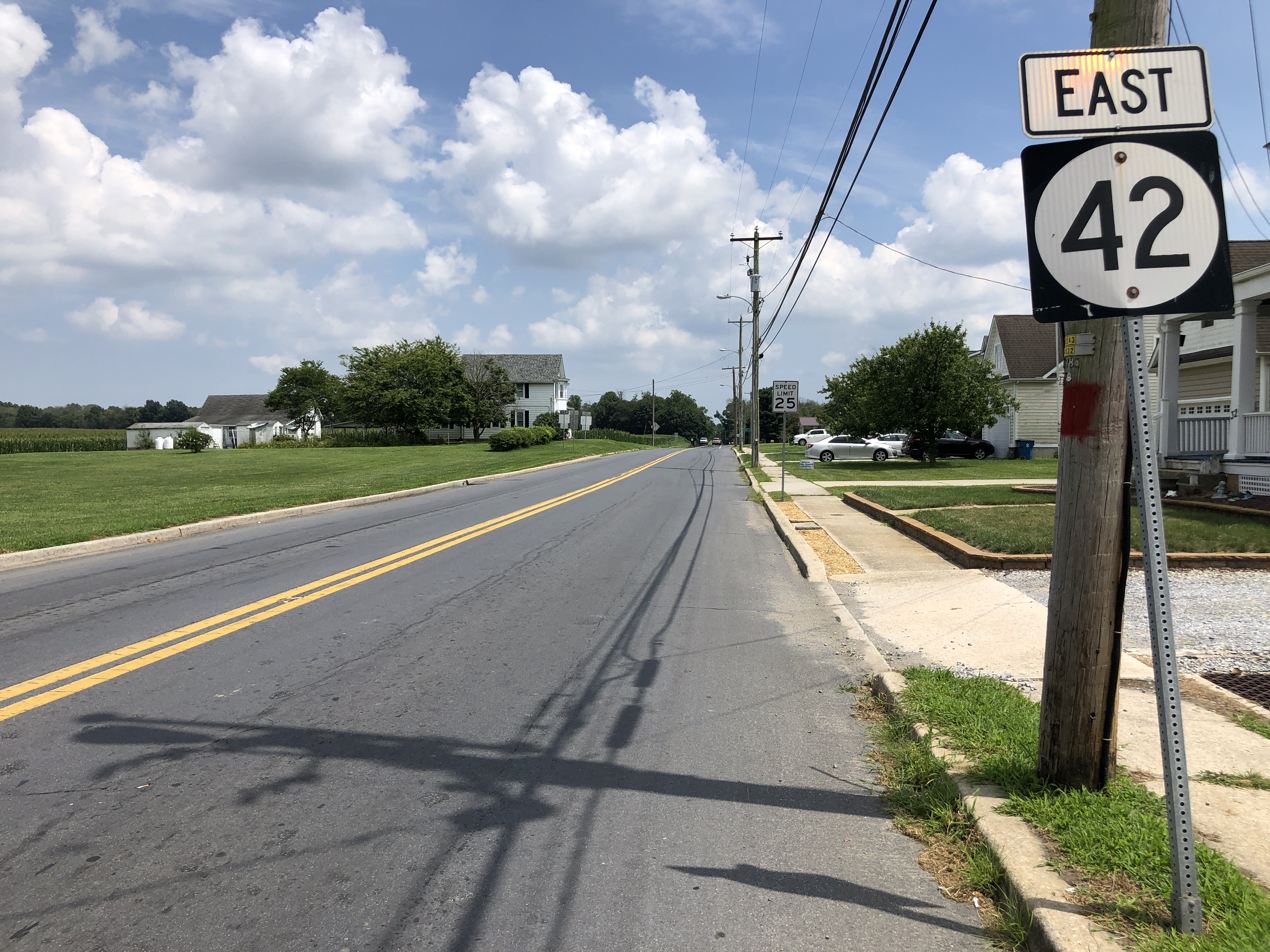
DE 42 eastbound in Kenton

Kenton is located at the intersection of Delaware Route 42 and Delaware Route 300. DE 42 passes northwest–southeast through the town on Commerce Street, heading northwest toward Blackiston and east toward Cheswold, where it has an intersection with U.S. Route 13 that provides access to the city of Dover to the south. DE 300 passes southwest–northeast through the town on Main Street, heading west toward the Maryland border and the Chesapeake Bay Bridge and northeast toward Smyrna, where it has an intersection with US 13 that provides access to the city of Wilmington to the north.

=== Utilities ===
Delmarva Power, a subsidiary of Exelon, provides electricity to Kenton. Chesapeake Utilities provides natural gas to the town. Trash collection in Kenton is provided by private haulers including Waste Industries, RPJ Waste Services, Inc., and Waste Management.

== Education ==
The school district is Smyrna School District. Its comprehensive high school is Smyrna High School.
