= Charles Pope (English cricketer) =

English schoolmaster and cricketer

Charles George Pope (21 January 1872 – 31 January 1959) was an English schoolmaster and a cricketer who played first-class cricket for Cambridge University and the Marylebone Cricket Club between 1892 and 1895. He was born at Sandy, Bedfordshire and died at New Milton, Hampshire.

Pope was educated at Harrow School and at Trinity College, Cambridge. He was captain of cricket at Harrow in 1891 and led his side to victory in the annual Eton v Harrow match at Lord's. A right-handed batsman and a right-arm medium-fast bowler, he had limited opportunities at Cambridge and played only once for the first eleven in 1892 and three times in 1893. In one of the 1893 games, against the Marylebone Cricket Club, he took five second innings wickets for 39 runs and eight wickets in the match, by some distance his best first-class bowling performance. He was not, however, chosen for the 1893 University Match against Oxford. He played more regularly in 1894, though without success with either bat or ball, and won his Blue, taking two wickets and scoring 11 and 0 as Cambridge were easily beaten by Oxford.

Pope graduated from Cambridge University with a first-class degree in 1894. He returned for a single final first-class cricket match in 1895, and from that season through to 1901 he also played Minor Counties cricket for Bedfordshire. He became a schoolmaster and from 1899 to 1929 he was on the staff at Harrow School, where he had been a pupil too.
