= Aspendale (Kenton) =

Historic house in Delaware, United States

- U.S. National Register of Historic Places
- U.S. National Historic Landmark
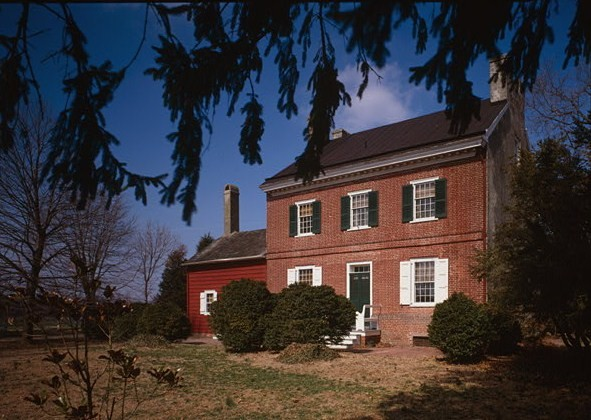
- Aspendale, HABS Photo, 1982

- Location within Delaware Location within the United States
- Location: 1 mile (1.6 km) west of Kenton, Delaware on Delaware Route 300
- Coordinates: 39°13′18″N 75°41′9″W
- Area: 210 acres (85 ha)
- Built: 1771–1773
- Architectural style: Georgian
- NRHP reference No.: 70000170

Significant dates
- Added to NRHP: April 15, 1970
- Designated NHL: April 15, 1970

Aspendale is a historic house and plantation property on Delaware Route 300 west of Kenton, Kent County, Delaware, United States. The main house, built 1771–73, has been under a single family's ownership since construction and is a rare, well-preserved example of a Georgian "Quaker plan" house. It was listed on the National Register of Historic Places and declared a National Historic Landmark in 1970.

== Description and history ==
Aspendale is located about 1 mile (1.6 km) west of Kenton, on the north side of Delaware Route 300. The property is over 200 acres (81 ha) in size, consisting of fields and woodlands roughly bisected by the road. The main house is set near the road, surrounded by landscaping. It is a modest 2 1/2-story brick structure with a gabled roof and end chimneys joined by curtain walls. A single-story gable-roofed wood-frame addition extends to one side. The front and rear of the main block consist of brick laid in a Flemish bond, while the ends are laid in a common bond. The main facade is three bays wide, with a symmetrical arrangement of sash windows around a center entrance. In a traditional Delaware pattern, the ground-floor windows have paneled shutters, while the upper-level windows have louvered shutters. The interior has a rare example of a "Quaker plan", with a sizeable front-to-back parlor on the east side and a study and living room separated by a hall on the west side. These rooms all exhibit original woodwork and other features.

The land on which the house stands was deeded in 1770 to Charles Numbers and was (as of its landmark designation in 1970) still in the hands of Numbers' descendants. The house was built between 1771 and 1773. The large parlor was subdivided with partitions in the 19th century, and a Victorian porch was added; both elements were reversed during a restoration of the property in the 1960s.

== See also ==
- List of National Historic Landmarks in Delaware
- National Register of Historic Places listings in Kent County, Delaware
