= Poppe =

Poppe is a surname, and may refer to:

- Eduard Poppe, German rugby union international
- Edward Poppe, beatified Belgian priest
- Enno Poppe, German composer and conductor
- Erik Poppe, Norwegian film director
- Erling Poppe, British engineer of Norwegian descent
- Gerd Poppe (1941–2025), German politician
- Guido Poppe, Belgian malacologist and shell dealer
- Haagen Poppe (born 1995), Norwegian politician
- Johann Poppe, German architect
- Ludo Poppe, producer of Third World reality TV
- Maddie Poppe, American singer
- Martine Poppe, Norwegian visual artist
- Nicholas Poppe, Russian linguist
- Nils Poppe, Swedish actor
- Patti Poppe, American businesswoman, CEO of CMS Energy
- Peter August Poppe, Norwegian engineer
- Remi Poppe, Dutch politician and environmental activist
- Simon Albrecht Poppe (1847–1907), German naturalist
- Ulrike Poppe, German politician
- Walter Poppe (general), German Generalleutnant during WW II
- Walter Poppe (footballer), German international footballer
