= James Pope =

James Pope may refer to:

- James Colledge Pope (1826–1885), land proprietor and politician on Prince Edward Island, Canada
- James Pope (educationalist) (1837–1913), New Zealand teacher, school inspector, educationalist, amateur astronomer and writer
- James W. Pope (1856–1937), politician from Massachusetts
- James P. Pope (1884–1966), politician from Idaho
- James Pope (baseball), American baseball player
- J. Rogers Pope (born 1941), school superintendent and politician from Louisiana
