= Charles Pope (Continental Army officer) =

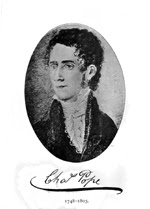
- Posthumous portrait of Charles Pope, c. 1810–1815
- Born: 1748; Smyrna, Delaware Colony, British America
- Died: February 16, 1803 (aged 54–55); Georgia, U.S.
- Burial place: Columbia County, Georgia
- Military career
- Allegiance: United States
- Branch: Army; Navy
- Service years: 1775–1779
- Rank: Colonel

Charles Pope (1748–1803) was a Continental Army officer during the American Revolutionary War.

He was named a captain in the Delaware Regiment in 1776, and was promoted to Lieutenant Colonel in 1777. He resigned from the service in 1779.

== Early life ==
Not much is known of Charles' early life. He was born in 1748 at Smyrna, Delaware, and his father was most likely named Thomas. He was a merchant.

== Military career ==
When the American Revolutionary War broke out in 1775, Pope gathered a local militia in his home town in order to fight the British. In 1776, he was commissioned Captain by the Continental Congress, and later lieutenant-colonel in the Delaware Regiment.
