= Capital School District =

School district in Delaware, United States

Location
- 198 Commerce Way, Dover, DE 19904 Central Kent County, Delaware United States

District information
- Type: Public
- Motto: "Educational excellence today for a changing tomorrow."
- Grades: K−12
- Established: 1925
- Superintendent: Dr. Victoir Cahoon
- Budget: $93,108,292 (Preliminary)

Students and staff
- Students: 6,250
- Teachers: 444
- Staff: 422
- Athletic conference: Henlopen North Conference
- District mascot: Senator
- Colors: Blue and White

Other information
- Website: Official Site

Capital School District is a public school district in Kent County, Delaware in the United States. It serves the greater Dover area.

== Geography ==
The district covers a 125-square-mile (320 km^{2}) area in central Kent County.

Communities served include the majority of Dover, as well as Cheswold, Hartly, Little Creek, and most of Leipsic.

It also serves the Delaware side of Marydel.

== School Board ==
- President: Chanda Jackson-Short
- Vice President: Sean P.M. Christiansen
- Members: Felicia Duggins, Vickie L. Pendleton, Donna Johnson Geist

== History ==
Capital School District was formed in 1969 through the consolidation of the Dover Special, Hartly, Rose Valley, and Wiley's school districts and the William Henry Comprehensive School.

== Schools ==
=== High School (Grades 9-12) ===
School	Principal	Built	Enrollment	Website
Dover High School	Shawndell Solomon	1965	1,768	https://doverhigh.capital.k12.de.us/

=== Middle Schools (Grades 6-8) ===
School	Principal	Built	Enrollment	Website
Middle School of Excellence	Sherrie Sudler	2023		https://mse.capital.k12.de.us/
Middle School of Innovation	Joe Evans	2023		https://msi.capital.k12.de.us/

=== Early Childhood Centers and Elementary Schools (Grades PreK-5) ===
School	Principal	Built	Enrollment	Website
East Dover Early Childhood Center	Nicole Ickes	1954	327	https://east.capital.k12.de.us/
Fairview Early Childhood Center	Krista Seifert	1965	277	https://fairview.capital.k12.de.us/
Hartly Elementary School	Jennifer Christman	1956	280	https://hartly.capital.k12.de.us/
North Dover Elementary School	Shani Benson	1996	290	https://north.capital.k12.de.us/
South Dover Elementary School	Lenita McIntyre	2004	576	https://south.capital.k12.de.us/
Towne Point Elementary School	Marie Robinson	1965	273	https://townepoint.capital.k12.de.us/
Booker T. Washington Elementary School	LaWanda Burgoyne	1922	280	https://btw.capital.k12.de.us/
Central Elementary School	Melissa White	1923	650	https://central.capital.k12.de.us/

=== Other ===
School	Principal	Built	Enrollment	Website
Kent County Community School	Robert Bennett	1975	256	https://kccs.capital.k12.de.us/
Kent County Secondary Intensive Learning Center	Ryan Robinson		87	https://kcilc.capital.k12.de.us/

== Awards and achievements ==
Three schools in the district have been recognized as National Blue Ribbon Schools of Excellence.

- Dover High School (1986)
- Booker T. Washington Elementary (2005)
- Fairview Elementary (2006)

Capital School District also has nine National Board Certified Professionals.

Name	Position	School
Tammy Agustus	Principal	Hartly Elementary
Linda Braswell	Instructional Technology Specialist	District Office
Lisa Burnham	6th Grade	William Henry Middle
Cheryl Heslinga	Chemistry	Dover High
Barbara Johnson	3rd and 4th Grades	East Dover Elementary
Suzette Marine	Principal	North Dover
Nancy Raab	Library Media Specialist	Hartly Elementary
Terri Shane	3rd Grade	Hartly Elementary
Erin Wilson	3rd Grade	Hartly Elementary

== Unions ==
The Capital Educators Association (CEA) is the teachers' union for this school district. Lee Olmstead currently serves as president.
