= Hartly, Delaware =

- Town
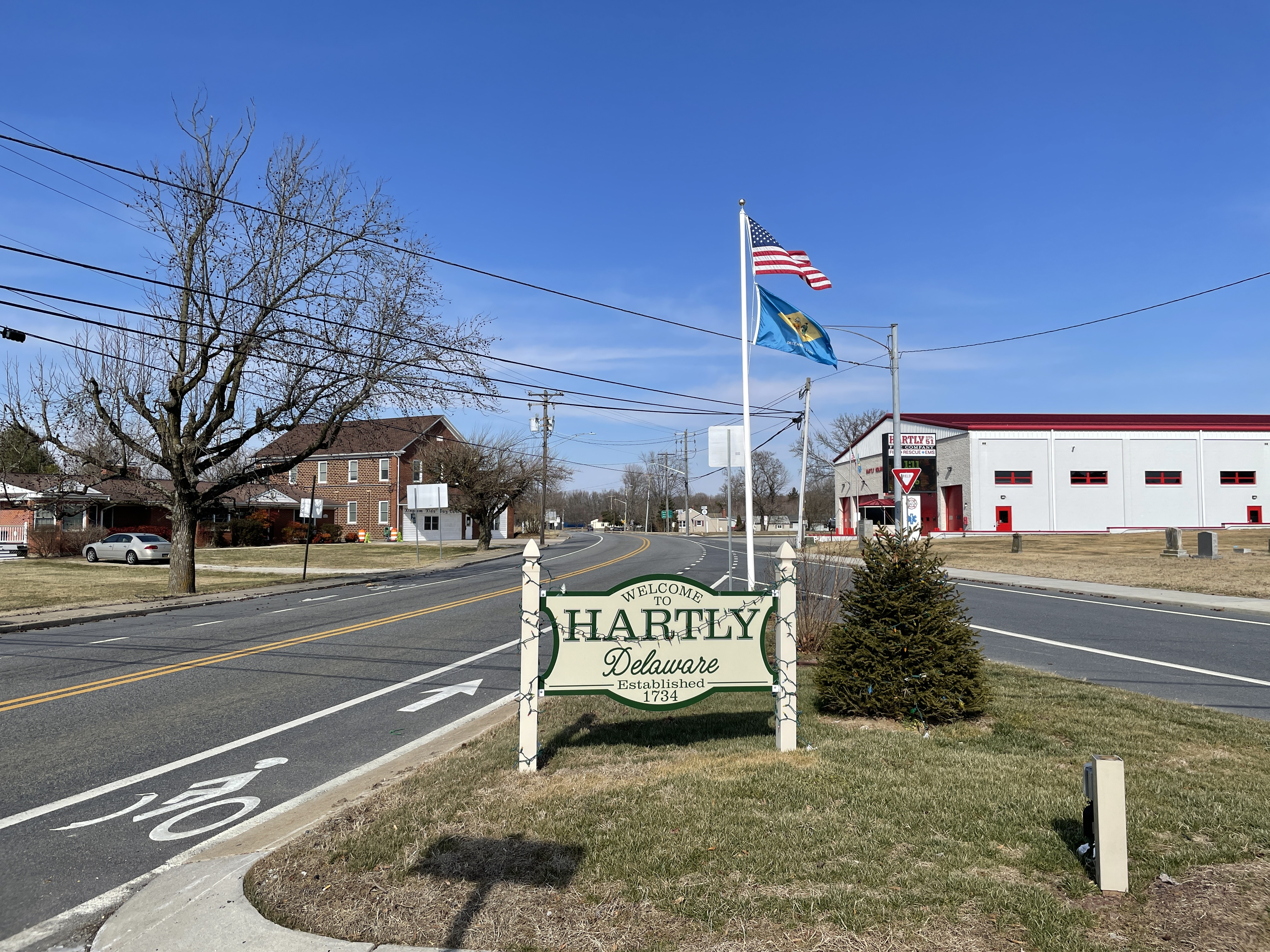
- Intersection of DE 11 and DE 44 in Hartly

- Location of Hartly in Kent County, Delaware.

- Location within the state of Delaware Hartly (the United States)
- Coordinates: 39°10′07″N 75°42′48″W
- Country: United States
- State: Delaware
- County: Kent

Area
  - Total: 0.058 sq mi (0.15 km^{2})
  - Land: 0.058 sq mi (0.15 km^{2})
  - Water: 0 sq mi (0.00 km^{2})
- Elevation: 69 ft (21 m)

Population (2020)
  - Total: 73
  - Density: 1,290/sq mi (497.9/km^{2})
- Time zone: UTC−5 (Eastern (EST))
  - Summer (DST): UTC−4 (EDT)
- ZIP code: 19953
- Area code: 302
- FIPS code: 10-33250
- GNIS feature ID: 214061
- Website: hartly.delaware.gov

Hartly is a town in Kent County, Delaware, United States. It is part of the Dover metropolitan area. The population was 73 in 2020, making it the least populous municipality in Delaware.

== Geography ==
Hartly is located at 39°10′07″N 75°42′48″W.

According to the United States Census Bureau, the town has a total area of 0.1 square miles (0.26 km^{2}), all land.

Hartly is located at the intersection of Delaware Route 11 and Delaware Route 44. The town is home to approximately 31 residences, the Hartly Volunteer Fire Company, a post office, Hartly Elementary School, two daycares, Hartly Feed and Hardware, and a Family Dollar store. There are several vacant and abandoned buildings along with empty lots in Hartly.

== 1983 tornado ==
On July 21, 1983, an F2 tornado struck Hartly, causing 2 deaths and 9 injuries. It is the deadliest tornado in Delaware history.

== Demographics ==
Historical population
Census	Pop.	Note	%±
1920	905		—
1930	101		−88.8%
1940	125		23.8%
1950	139		11.2%
1960	164		18.0%
1970	180		9.8%
1980	106		−41.1%
1990	107		0.9%
2000	78		−27.1%
2010	74		−5.1%
2020	73		−1.4%
U.S. Decennial Census

At the 2000 census there were 78 people in 25 households, including 21 families, in the town. The population density was 1,345.9 inhabitants per square mile (519.7/km^{2}). There were 31 housing units at an average density of 534.9 units per square mile (206.5 units/km^{2}). The racial makeup of the town was 91.03% White, 3.85% African American, 1.28% from other races, and 3.85% from two or more races. Hispanic or Latino of any race were 2.56%.

Of the 25 households 60.0% had children under the age of 18 living with them, 52.0% were married couples living together, 24.0% had a female householder with no husband present, and 16.0% were non-families. 4.0% of households were one person and none had someone living alone who was 65 or older. The average household size was 3.12 and the average family size was 3.29.

The age distribution was 34.6% under the age of 18, 9.0% from 18 to 24, 39.7% from 25 to 44, 14.1% from 45 to 64, and 2.6% 65 or older. The median age was 28 years. For every 100 females, there were 81.4 males. For every 100 females age 18 and over, there were 59.4 males.

The median household income was $29,375 and the median family income was $29,375. Males had a median income of $21,667 versus $24,167 for females. The per capita income for the town was $11,516. There were 14.3% of families and 19.5% of the population living below the poverty line, including 19.2% of under eighteens and none of those over 64.

== Education ==
Hartly is in the Capital School District. Dover High School is the comprehensive high school of the district.

== Government ==
Hartly is governed by a five-member Town Council. As of 2022, the Town Council consists of President Mark A. Maguire, Vice President Raymond K. Morris, Treasurer Suzanne K. Morris, Secretary Megan S. Raughley, and Land Use Administrator Robert J. Graves. Town meetings are held once every two months at the Hartly Volunteer Fire Company.

In 2015, the town of Hartly had no functioning government after fatigue had hit the Town Council about three years earlier and many members did not return to their posts. As a result, the town government could not pay bills, collect taxes, enforce codes, or apply for state aid. The town had not collected taxes for two years and was in thousands of dollars of debt. As a result, the town needed to reform its government or unincorporate and be governed directly by Kent County. A meeting was held in January 2015 at the Hartly Volunteer Fire Company on reforming the town government. The meeting was attended by about 150 people, of which 16 lived in the town of Hartly and could run for office.

== Infrastructure ==
=== Transportation ===
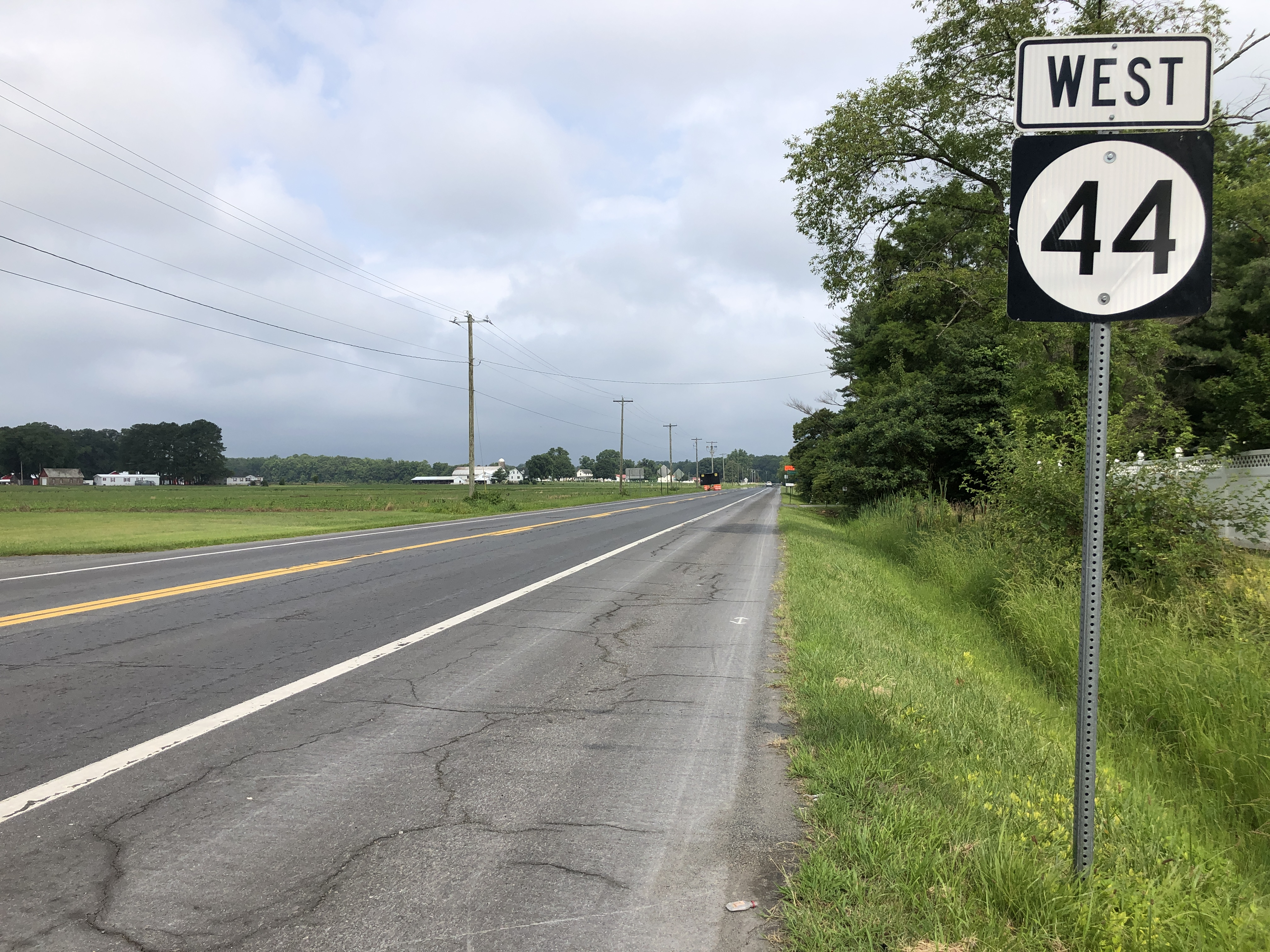
DE 44 westbound in Hartly

Hartly is located at the intersection of Delaware Route 11 and Delaware Route 44. DE 11 passes southwest–northeast through the town on Arthursville Road, heading southwest toward the Maryland border and Templeville, Maryland and northeast toward Kenton. DE 44 passes northwest–southeast through the town on Main Street, heading northwest to an intersection with Delaware Route 300 in Everetts Corner that provides access to the Chesapeake Bay Bridge and southeast to an intersection with Delaware Route 8 in Pearsons Corner that provides access to the city of Dover.

=== Utilities ===
Delmarva Power, a subsidiary of Exelon, provides electricity to Hartly. Chesapeake Utilities provides natural gas to the town.
