= Hameen Ali =

American college football player (born 1977)

No. 33 – William & Mary Tribe
- Position: Tailback

Personal information
- Born: April 14, 1977 (age 49); Harrisburg, Pennsylvania, U.S.
- Listed height: 5 ft 9 in (1.75 m)
- Listed weight: 205 lb (93 kg)

Career information
- High school: Dover (DE)
- College: William & Mary (1996–2000)

Awards and highlights
- Disney's Wide World of Sports Spirit Award (2000); Yankee Conference championship (1996); Lambert Cup (1996)

Hameen Mursal Ali III (born April 14, 1977) is an American former college football player for the College of William & Mary who is best known for being the 2000 recipient of the Disney Sports Spirit Award. The award is presented annually to "college football's most inspirational athlete, who displays a sense of courage and an undying love for the game, while overcoming adversity on or off the field."

== Early life ==
Ali overcame many obstacles in life prior to earning an athletic scholarship to play for William & Mary, located in Williamsburg, Virginia. As a child, Ali, his mother, and his sisters often had to live in their station wagon in Dover, Delaware because "that's all we had," he later said (he even spent one Christmas Eve in the car). At age 12, Ali was kicked out of sixth grade for getting into too many fights. In 1990, he stepped in to stop his mother's new boyfriend from being abusive toward his younger sisters; the boyfriend then went after him instead. His sisters were fathered by different men, and Ali used to sell drugs on the corner. He ran away and eventually found himself living in a foster home.

== College ==
Ali credits living in a foster home as the best thing that could have happened to him. It provided stability, and after a stellar football career at Dover High School, he was awarded an athletic scholarship to play for the Tribe. Ali suited up for the Tribe from 1996 to 2000. In his true freshman season they won the Yankee Conference championship, made it to the quarterfinals of the NCAA Division I-AA Playoffs, and were named that year's Lambert Cup winners. Two years later, in his redshirt sophomore season, he led William & Mary rushing; he led the team again the next season as well. While he did not repeat a third time in leading the Tribe in rushing, he did finish his career after the 2000 season having accumulated 21 touchdowns, 2,217 yards rushing with an additional 48 catches for 482 yards receiving. (at the time of his graduation in 2001, this total rushing yards ranked him eighth all-time in school history).

On December 7, 2000, the National College Football Awards Association presented him with their Sports Spirit Award in Lake Buena Vista, Florida during an annual ceremony.
