= Delaware Route 8 =

State highway in Kent County, Delaware, United States

Delaware Route 8

Route information
- Maintained by DelDOT
- Length: 17.15 mi (27.60 km)
- Existed: 1936–present

Major junctions
- West end: MD 454 in Marydel
- DE 44 in Pearsons Corner; DE 15 in Dover; US 13 Alt. in Dover; US 13 in Dover; DE 1 Toll near Dover
- East end: DE 9 in Little Creek

Location
- Country: United States
- State: Delaware
- Counties: Kent

Highway system
- Delaware State Route System; List; Byways
← DE 7	→ US 9

Delaware Route 8 (DE 8) is a state highway located in Kent County in the U.S. state of Delaware. It runs from Maryland Route 454 (MD 454) at the Maryland border in Marydel east to an intersection with DE 9 in Little Creek. The route passes through rural areas of western Kent County before heading through Delaware's capital city, Dover, on Forrest Avenue and Division Street. East of Dover, the road passes through more rural areas. DE 8 intersects DE 44 in Pearsons Corner; DE 15, U.S. Route 13 Alternate (US 13 Alt.), and US 13 in Dover; and the DE 1 toll road at a partial interchange east of Dover. The road was built as a state highway west of Dover by 1924 and east of Dover by 1931. The DE 8 designation was given to the road by 1936.

== Route description ==
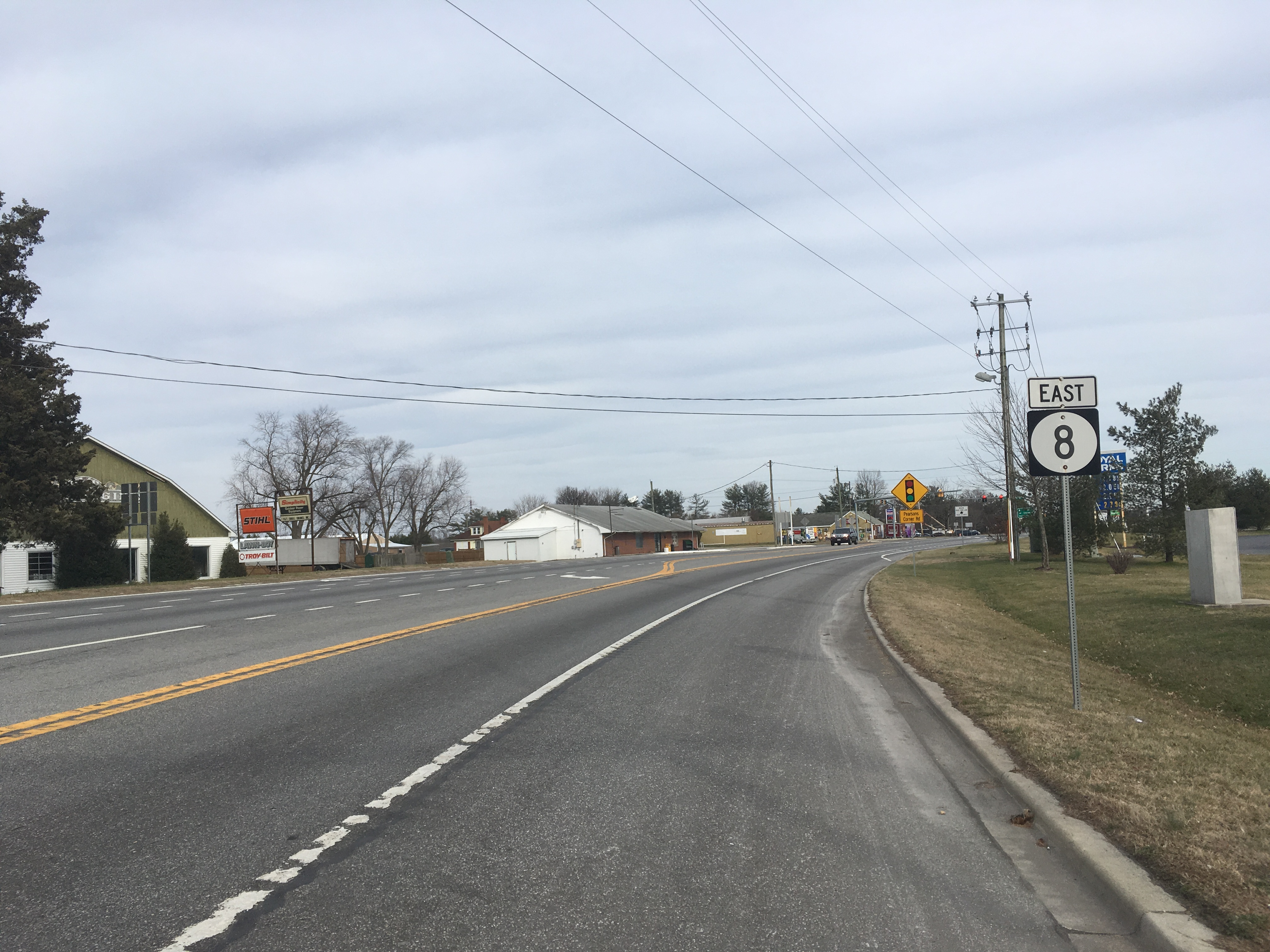
DE 8 eastbound past the eastern terminus of DE 44 in Pearsons Corner

DE 8 begins at the Maryland border in the community of Marydel, where the road continues northwest into the town of Marydel, Maryland, as MD 454. From the state line, the route heads southeast on two-lane undivided Halltown Road, passing a few homes and businesses. The road leaves Marydel and curves northeast through a mix of farmland and woodland with some residences. In the community of Pearsons Corner, DE 8 intersects the eastern terminus of DE 44, where it turns to the east past businesses and the name changes to Forrest Avenue upon crossing Pearsons Corner Road. From here, the route runs through more rural areas with some development. This area of Kent County is home to many Amish farms, homes, and businesses.

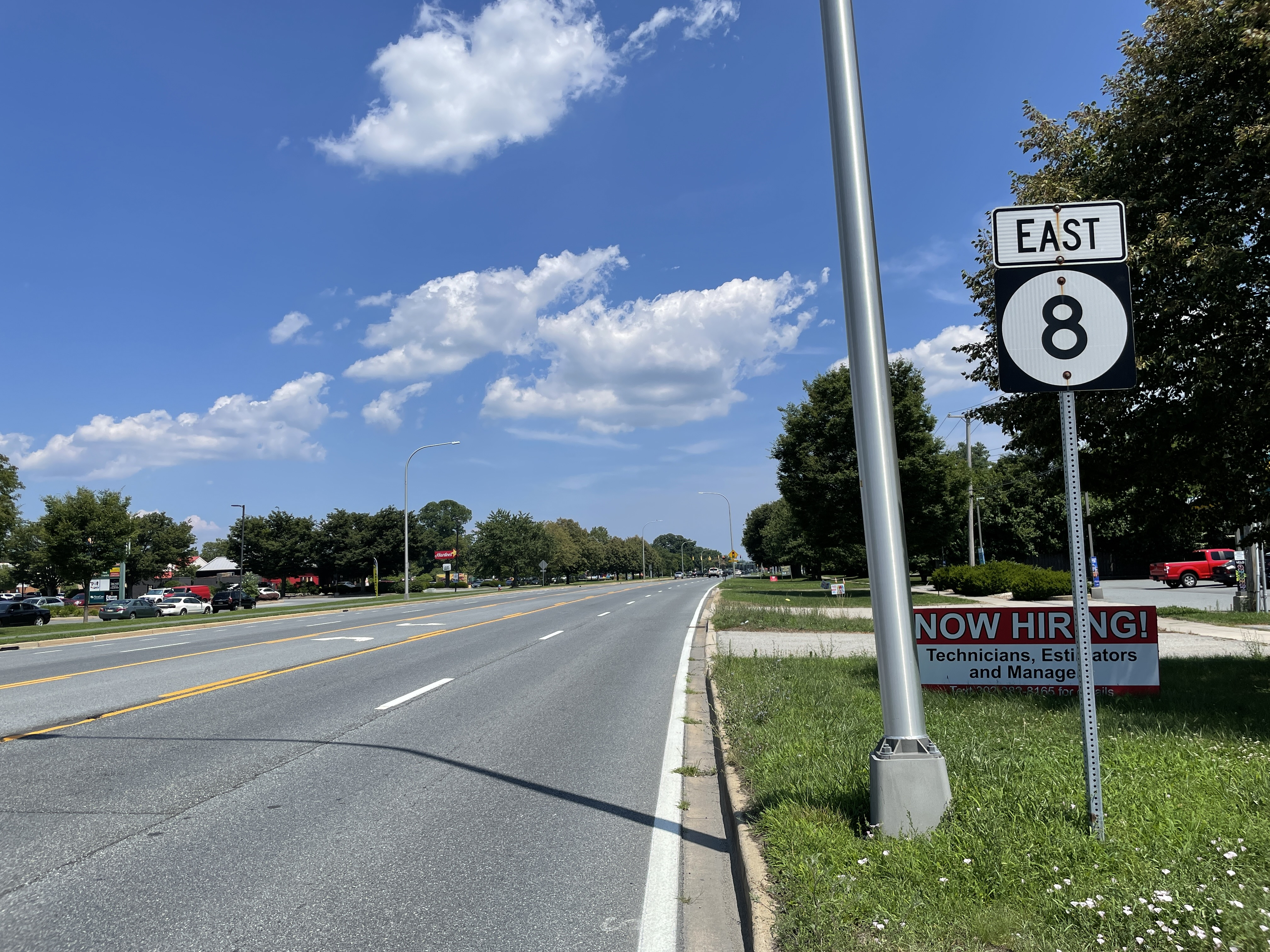
DE 8 eastbound in the western part of Dover

DE 8 crosses into the city of Dover, where it passes to the north of Dover High School before it widens to a five-lane road with a center left-turn lane. The road runs past homes and businesses in the western part of Dover, intersecting Kenton Road and DE 15. The name changes to Forest Street upon crossing DE 15 and the route continues east onto West Division Street at the point Forest Street splits to the southeast to lead to Loockerman Street and downtown Dover. At this point, DE 8 narrows to a two-lane road. The route crosses the Delmarva Central Railroad's Delmarva Subdivision line at-grade and continues past a mix of homes and businesses to the north of the downtown area. The road intersects US 13 Alt. and passes to the south of the Delaware State University Downtown campus before a junction with State Street, where the name becomes East Division Street. The route comes to an intersection with Kings Highway SW north of the Delaware Governor's Mansion and the name changes to Kings Highway NE. DE 8 crosses the St. Jones River and Kings Highway NE splits to the north, with DE 8 once again becoming East Division Street. The road heads between businesses to the north and residential neighborhoods to the south, widening to four lanes.

DE 8 intersects US 13 in a commercial area and continues through the residential eastern part of Dover as a two-lane road. The name changes to North Little Creek Road and the route heads through less dense areas of homes with some farmland. At the eastern edge of the city, the roadway has a partial interchange with the DE 1 toll road, providing access to northbound DE 1 and from southbound DE 1. After this interchange, the road leaves Dover and continues east through open agricultural areas, crossing the Little River. DE 8 reaches its eastern terminus at an intersection with DE 9 on the northern border of the town of Little Creek.

DE 8 has an annual average daily traffic count ranging from a high of 21,663 vehicles at the DE 15 intersection to a low of 858 vehicles at the Little Creek border near the eastern terminus. The portion of DE 8 between DE 44 and DE 15 is part of the National Highway System.

== History ==
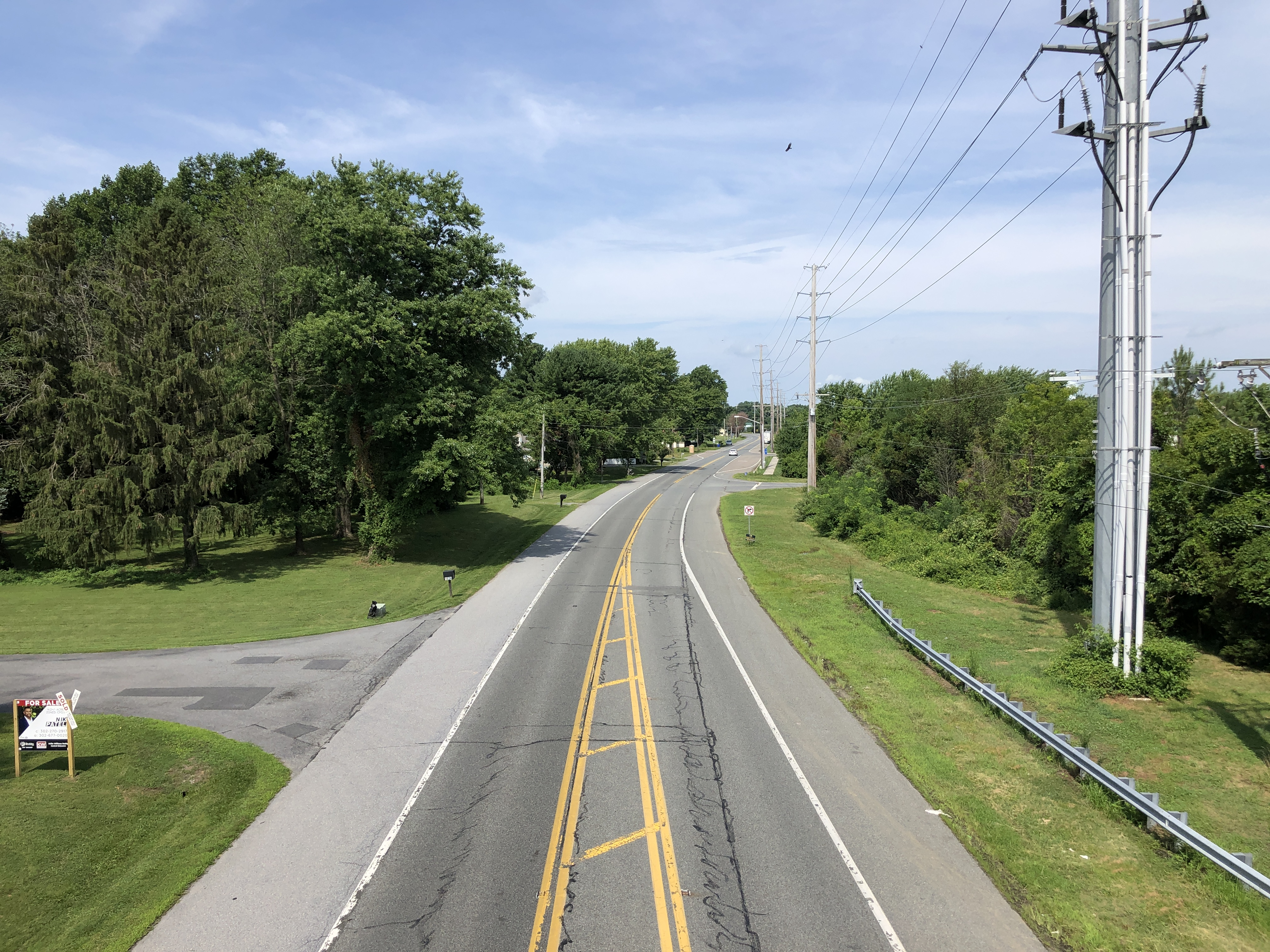
DE 8 westbound entering Dover

By 1920, what is now DE 8 existed as an unimproved county road. The route was completed as a state highway between the Maryland border in Marydel and Dover by 1924. By 1925, the road was proposed as a state highway between Dover and Little Creek. This state highway was completed by 1931. DE 8 was assigned to its current alignment between the Maryland border in Marydel and DE 9 north of Little Creek by 1936.

On September 5, 2002, a partial interchange opened at the DE 1 toll road in Dover, utilizing existing emergency vehicle ramps. This interchange was included in the initial plans for the highway but was dropped due to low traffic volumes. As part of building the interchange, the Delaware Department of Transportation purchased development rights to adjacent land parcels in order to prevent additional development in the area of the interchange. In 2012, the Interdenominational Ministerial Alliance pushed for the city of Dover to rename the Division Street portion of DE 8 to Martin Luther King Jr. Boulevard after civil rights leader Martin Luther King Jr. However, local merchants opposed the renaming. The Dover city council instead voted to rename Court Street, Duke of York Street, and William Penn Street near Delaware Legislative Hall to Martin Luther King Jr. Boulevard.

== Major intersections ==
The entire route is in Kent County.

Location	mi	km	Destinations	Notes
Marydel	0.00	0.00	MD 454 north (Halltown Road) – Marydel, Bay Bridge	Maryland state line; western terminus
Pearsons Corner	6.33	10.19	DE 44 west (Hartly Road) – Hartly	Eastern terminus of DE 44
Dover	11.99	19.30	DE 15 (Saulsbury Road) – Cheswold	
Dover	12.80	20.60	US 13 Alt. (Governors Avenue)	
Dover	13.53	21.77	US 13 (Dupont Highway) – Smyrna, Dover AFB	
Dover			DE 1 Toll north – Wilmington	DE 1 exit 98; access to northbound DE 1 and from southbound DE 1
Little Creek	17.15	27.60	DE 9 (Bayside Drive) – Leipsic, Port Mahon, Little Creek	Eastern terminus
1.000 mi = 1.609 km; 1.000 km = 0.621 mi: Incomplete access
