= DE44 =

DE44 may refer to:

- Delaware Route 44
- ROCS Lung Shan (DE-44), the former USS Schmitt (DE-676), transferred 1968 to Taiwan and scrapped in 1976
- USS Donaldson (DE-44), an Evarts-class destroyer escort of the United States Navy during World War II, sold for scrapping 1946
