= Carleton Carey =

American politician

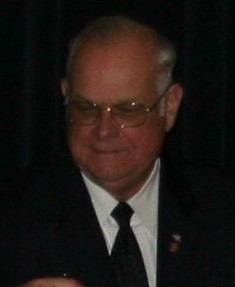

Mayor of Dover, Delaware
- In office October 8, 2007 – April 28, 2014
- Preceded by: Stephen Speed
- Succeeded by: Robin Christiansen

Personal details
- Party: Independent
- Spouse: Blanche
- Children: Carleton Carey, Jr., and David Carey
- Profession: Politician

Carleton E. Carey Sr. (born 1943) is an American politician who served as the Mayor of Dover, Delaware, the capital of the U.S. state of Delaware, from 2007 to 2014. Carey is Dover's third full-time mayor.

Incumbent Dover Mayor, Stephen Speed, resigned from office on July 22, 2007, to become director of the aviation program at Delaware State University. Dover was required by law to hold a special mayoral election within thirty to sixty days from Speed's resignation. Carey, a city councilman, was elected Mayor of Dover in a nine-candidate, special election held on September 18, 2007. He won the election with 959 votes, defeating his eight opponents. Carey was sworn into office on Monday, October 8, 2007.

Carey filed to run for a second, two-year term on December 17, 2009. He won re-election to a second, two-year term on April 20, 2010. Carey won the election with 1,507 votes, easily defeating his nearest opponents. Former Delaware state Rep., Nancy H. Wagner, came in second with 863 votes, while former Dover city councilman, William H. Daisey, garnered 553 votes.

Mayor Carey filed for re-election to a third term in January 2012. Carey was unopposed in the election, since no other candidate filed to run against him by the January 31st mayoral deadline. Carey's third term will be three-years long, as Dover transitions from two-year to three-year mayoral terms. The election was held on April 17, 2012, and Carey retained his seat unopposed. On April 28, 2014, Carey resigned as mayor. Robin Christiansen succeeded Carey as mayor, having been elected in a special election on June 17, 2014.

In 2015, Carey ran for mayor against incumbent Robin Christiansen and retired teacher George Gaudioso. Carey lost the election to Christiansen on April 21, 2015 with 622 votes, behind Christiansen's 1,390 votes.

Political offices
Preceded by Stephen Speed	Mayor of Dover, Delaware; 2007–2014	Succeeded by Robin Christiansen
