= Stephen Speed =

American politician

Stephen R. Speed

Mayor of Dover, Delaware
- In office May 10, 2004 – July 22, 2007
- Preceded by: James "Hutch" Hutchison
- Succeeded by: Carleton Carey

Personal details
- Born: 1963 (age 62–63) Wilmington, Delaware
- Party: Republican
- Spouse: Lori
- Education: Florida Institute of Technology (MBA)

Stephen R. Speed (born c. 1963), is a retired captain, U.S. Naval officer and politician from Dover, in Kent County, Delaware. Formerly on Dover City Council, he was elected as the non-partisan mayor of Dover, Delaware. Speed was Dover's second full-time mayor.

He resigned in July 2007 to accept a position with Delaware State University, spending eight years as the director of the Aviation Program. Speed later left DSU to pursue a career as a commercial pilot.

== Early life and family ==
Speed was born in 1963. After graduation from U.S. Naval Academy in 1985, he served as an active duty navy officer from 1985 until 1994. He retired as a captain from the Navy Reserve in 2010. He received his MBA from the Florida Institute of Technology in 1993, and was self-employed as a realtor from 1994 until 2004. He and his wife, Lori, have two daughters.

== Political career ==
Dover, Delaware operates with a council-manager form of government. The mayor and nine council members serve two-year terms and hire a city manager to manage municipal operations. Speed was elected Dover 1st District Councilman in May 2001 and was the mayor of Dover, Delaware from May 10, 2004. He won reelection to a second two-year term in April 2006.

Speed resigned from office, effective July 22, 2007, to accept a position as the director of the Aviation Program at Delaware State University. Carleton Carey won a special mayor election held on September 18, 2007, to succeed Speed.

In 2010, Speed campaigned for the Kent County Levy Court as a Republican, but lost the election.

Political offices
Preceded by James Hutchison	Mayor of Dover, Delaware; 2004–2007	Succeeded by Carleton Carey
