= James Hutchison (American politician) =

American politician (born 1942)

Mayor of Dover, Delaware
- In office May 9, 1994 – May 10, 2004
- Preceded by: Aaron O. Knopf
- Succeeded by: Stephen Speed

Personal details
- Born: June 20, 1942 (age 84) Dover, Delaware, U.S.
- Party: Republican
- Spouse: Cathleen Hutchison
- Children: James Hutchinson Jr.
- Education: Delaware Technical Community College

James L. "Hutch" Hutchison Sr. (born June 20, 1942) is an American politician. Hutchison served as the first full-time Mayor of Dover, Delaware from 1994 to 2004. Hutchison is a member of the Republican Party. However, Dover's mayoral office is officially nonpartisan.

== Education ==
Hutchison, a native of Dover, graduated from Dover High School in 1961. He received an associate's degree in criminal justice from Delaware Technical Community College in 1987.

== Career ==
=== Policing ===
Hutchison served as the police chief of Dover prior to entering politics. He held Dover's at-large city council seat from 1993 to 1994.

=== Politics ===
In 1994, Hutchison was elected Dover's first full-time mayor. He retired from office in 2004.

In 2008, Hutchinson ran for the Delaware Senate in the 17th District, but lost the election to Democrat Brian Bushweller.

In January 2011, Hutchison announced his candidacy for an open seat in the Dover City Council, which was being vacated by retiring City Council President Ken Hogan. Hutchison won the City Council District 1 seat in the municipal election held on April 19, 2011, defeating Holly Malone.

In August 2011, Hutchison proposed lengthening the terms for the mayor and city council members from the current two-year term to four-years in office. Hutchison argued that the current election system, in which Dover's candidates must seek re-election every two years, is too expensive, costing the city approximately $10,000 per election. He told council that his proposal would save the city money and promote increased leadership among Dover's elected officials. Under his proposal, if enacted, the new four-year terms would be gradually phased in over a two-year period.

Political offices
Preceded by Aaron O. Knopf	Mayor of Dover, Delaware; 1994–2004	Succeeded by Stephen Speed
