= Robin Christiansen =

American politician

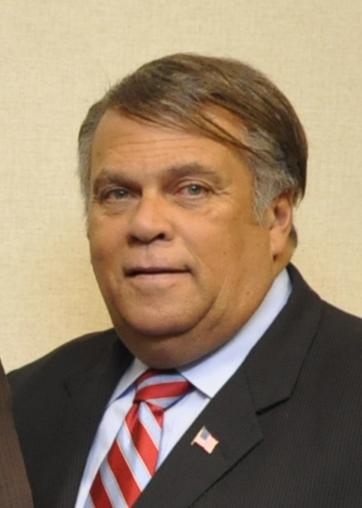

Mayor of Dover
- Incumbent
- Assumed office June 25, 2014
- Preceded by: Carleton Carey

Personal details
- Born: September 4, 1950 (age 74)
- Political party: Democratic
- Spouse: Cindy
- Children: 5
- Education: Delaware State University (BA)

Robin R. Christiansen (born September 4, 1950) is an American politician currently serving as the mayor of Dover, Delaware. He was elected mayor in a special election on June 17, 2014, and took office on June 25, 2014. Christiansen had previously served on the city council of Dover from 1983 to 2001, serving as council president and vice mayor from 1990 to 2001.

== Early life ==
Christiansen was born on September 4, 1950. Christiansen graduated from Dover High School in 1968 and attended Delaware State University, where he majored in history and political science.

== Career ==
He has worked for Safeway Inc., retiring in 1987, and also worked for SimplexGrinnell for 27 years before retiring.

Christiansen was elected to Dover City Council in May 1983 and served until May 2001. From May 1990 to May 2001, Christiansen served as council president and vice mayor.

In 2014, Christiansen ran in a special election for Mayor of Dover after Carleton Carey resigned. On June 17, 2014, Christiansen won the nonpartisan special election for mayor with 658 of the 1,678 votes cast, ahead of Councilman David Anderson with 534 votes, R. Jefferson Reed with 197 votes, James P. Webster with 188 votes, and Chevis R. Anderson with 101 votes. Christiansen was sworn in as Mayor of Dover on June 25, 2014, for a term expiring in May 2015. On April 21, 2015, Christiansen was elected to a full term as Mayor of Dover with 1,390 votes, ahead of former mayor Carleton Carey with 622 votes and retired teacher George Gaudioso with 104 votes.

Christiansen was formerly president of the Delaware League of Local Government and currently serves on the executive board. He has served on multiple committees of the National League of Cities. Christiansen has served as a member of the Governor's Council on Police Training under Governor Tom Carper and Jack Markell.

== Personal life ==
Christiansen is the child of Corrine P. Christiansen and Major A.L. Christiansen. He resides in Dover and has been married to his wife Cindy since c. 1976. They have five children and five grandchildren. He is an active volunteer for the Dover Little League and the Dover Fire Department. Christiansen attends church at Holy Cross Roman Catholic Church in Dover. He was formerly president of the North Dover Civic Association, having been one of its founders.

Political offices
Preceded by Carleton Carey	Mayor of Dover; 2014–present	Incumbent
