= Disney's Wide World of Sports Spirit Award =

American college football award

- Awarded for: College football's most inspirational individual or team
- Country: United States
- Presented by: Disney

History
- First award: 1996
- Most recent: Megan Twist and Richard Bremer
- Website: http://espnwwos.disney.go.com/about/spirit-award/

Disney's Wide World of Sports Spirit Award is presented annually to college football's most inspirational individual or team. The award is one of 21 that are part of the National College Football Awards Association (NCFAA).

== Previous winners ==
Year	Recipient/School
1996	Daniel Huffman, Rossville-Alvin High School (Rossville, Illinois)
Huffman gave up a promising football career to donate a kidney to his grandmother.
1997	Dwight Collins, University of Central Florida
Collins overcame a loss of hearing from meningitis to get a football scholarship at UCF.
1998	Matt Hartl, Northwestern University
Hartl, after being diagnosed with Hodgkin's lymphoma in 1996, returned as a starter in 1997. *The disease returned in 1998, and Hartl died on August 30, 1999, at the age of 23.
1999	East Carolina University
ECU overcame damage to their Greenville, North Carolina, campus from Hurricane Floyd to finish the season 9–3.
2000	Hameen Ali, the College of William & Mary
Ali overcame "a troubled youth, poverty-stricken living conditions and foster homes, among other obstacles."
2001	United States Service Academies
In the aftermath of 9/11, the members of the United States Air Force Academy, United States Military Academy, and United States Naval Academy teams were honored for their academic and athletic achievements, and their commitment to the military.
2002	Dewayne White, University of Louisville
White overcame the loss of both his parents, two fires that destroyed family homes, and a serious knee injury during his senior year of high school, and was selected 2001 Conference USA Defensive Player of the Year.
2003	Neil Parry, San Jose State University
Parry broke his leg in a game for SJSU; a week later, following an infection and nerve and arterial damage, it was amputated. Three years later, Parry, wearing a prosthetic leg, returned to the field for SJSU.
2004	Tim Frisby, University of South Carolina
Frisby walked on at wide receiver for the Gamecocks at age 39, after a 20-year career in the Army.
2005	Tulane University
In the wake of Hurricane Katrina, and the closure of the campus for the fall semester, Tulane was forced to play all 11 of its games on the road.
2006	Patrick Henry Hughes, University of Louisville
Hughes, Louisville's second recipient, is a member of Louisville's marching band, even though he was born with no eyes and cannot straighten his arms and legs. He shared the award with his father, Patrick John Hughes.
2007	Zerbin Singleton, United States Naval Academy
Singleton overcame personal tragedy and a broken collarbone that initially prevented him from enrolling in Annapolis.
2008	Tim Tebow, University of Florida
Tebow was honored for his "countless hours preaching and providing support to less fortunate people, capitalizing on virtually every opportunity to touch the lives of others."
2009	Mark Herzlich, Boston College
Herzlich was honored for his fight to overcome Ewing's sarcoma, and inspiring his teammates and other football teams to raise money for cancer research.
2010	D.J. Williams, University of Arkansas
Williams, his mother and two sisters fled their home in Dallas to escape a drug-addicted and abusive father. They landed in Arkansas, where they put down roots of their own. Williams used his stature on the Razorbacks football team and spread his story and message to others in groups like the Big Brothers and Big Sisters program, the local Boys and Girls Clubs and Children's Hospital.
2011	2011 Alabama Crimson Tide football team
The Alabama football team was honored for their collective efforts to assist in the rebuilding of Tuscaloosa following the April 27, 2011, tornado that devastated the city. The award was accepted by long snapper Carson Tinker who suffered a broken wrist when he was thrown from his home during the storm, with his girlfriend being one of the 43 fatalities attributed to the storm in Tuscaloosa.
2012	Nate Boyer, University of Texas at Austin
The Longhorns long snapper was recognized for his service as a Green Beret and his work with Darfur refugee camps.
2013	Devon Walker, Tulane Green Wave
Devon Walker has "exhibited tremendous courage and perseverance following a severe spinal cord injury last season, and has become a motivational figure for the football team, the university and the New Orleans community."
2014	Sterling Shepard, Bob Stoops; University of Oklahoma
Stoops and Shepard formed an inspirational bond from tragic death of former Sooners receiver, and Sterling's father, Derrick Shepard 15 years ago. Derrick Shepard was graduate assistant coach and former receiver at the university. Stoops became a father figure to the then six year old Sterling.
2015	Hank Goff, Concordia University (Saint Paul, Minnesota)
"After a nine-month combat stint in Afghanistan in April 2008, Goff struggled with post-combat trauma and post-traumatic stress disorder, which led to depression and excessive drinking. It was a dark period during which Goff said he felt like a monster. Goff credits football with helping him find his way back to the light. Today, at the advanced football age of 28, Goff has become a stellar Division II football player (this year, he was a preseason second-team All-American) who has begun to counsel fellow veterans coping with similar post-war challenges."
2016	James Conner, University of Pittsburgh
Returned from a December 2015 diagnosis of Hodgkin lymphoma and subsequent chemotherapy to run for over 1,000 yards and 20 touchdowns in 2016.
2017	University of Iowa
Created the "Hawkeye Wave", in which fans turn toward the children's hospital that overlooks Kinnick Stadium and wave toward patients and their families watching the game from the hospital.
2018	Tyler Trent, Purdue University
Tyler gained notoriety with the university after receiving chemotherapy and camped outside Ross Ade Stadium before the 2017 homecoming game. In 2018, he grew to national lore by predicting Purdue would beat then ranked #2 Ohio State in Tyler's first game back to campus since entering hospice care. Tyler celebrated with the team on the field and in the locker room after the win. Tyler's story has generated thousands of donations for cancer research and created an endowment with the Purdue Cancer Center. Tyler died from the rare bone cancer osteosarcoma on January 1, 2019, at the age of 20.
2019	Casey O'Brien, University of Minnesota
Overcame four bouts of cancer to play college football at Minnesota.
2020	Darien Rencher, Clemson University
An original walk-on who overcame multiple ACL tears during his high school career in Anderson, S.C. before walking on at his dream school, Clemson. He grew into one of Clemson's most respected leaders, primarily during a tumultuous 2020. He was a staple in the Upstate South Carolina community, serving as a frequent community servant and public speaker, and during the offseason he helped organize the Clemson Community Peaceful Demonstration against social inequality and also helped mobilize college football players nationwide to rally in support of playing safely during the pandemic with the hashtag #WeWantToPlay.
2021	Tre Tipton, University of Pittsburgh
Growing up outside Pittsburgh, life wasn't always easy. Tre struggled to deal with one family tragedy after another, as well as four season-ending injuries at Pitt. That eventually led to multiple suicide attempts and turned a traditional four-year college football experience for him into what is now his seventh year. But instead of letting his misfortune bring him down, he's using his circumstances to help others. Tre eventually committed to seeking the help that he needed for his mental health as well as his physical health. And he's helping to rescue others fighting similar demons with L.O.V.E. — Living Out Victoriously Everyday, a nonprofit organization he launched with a classmate aimed at providing mental health support for fellow students on campus and beyond. Tre also does motivational speaking about mental health around campus, at his old high school and the surrounding community.
2022	Tylee Craft, University of North Carolina at Chapel Hill
Craft embodies the essence of the award after being diagnosed with stage 4 large cell neuroendocrine carcinoma, a rare form of lung cancer, on March 14, 2022. According to his family, doctors said he was just weeks away from dying when they realized he was sick and took him to the hospital. Doctors at UNC Lineberger Comprehensive Cancer Center immediately started Craft on an aggressive regimen of chemotherapy and immunotherapy. “It felt good to be recognized and be surrounded by my teammates and coaches,” said Craft after practice recently when he learned that he had won the award. “That bond that we share on and off the field gets me through my days.” The UNC community quickly rallied around Craft. Teammates frequently visited him in the hospital, and, on April 9, the Tar Heels dedicated their annual spring football game to Craft, renaming the event the #TyleeStrong Spring Game. Craft died from the cancer on October 12, 2024, at the age of 23.
2023	Brian Dooley, Eastern Michigan University
Dooley showed the character and strength of spirit that makes him one of the country's best teammates when he donated his football scholarship to another Eastern Michigan player, Zack Conti, before the season. Conti, who initially had to try out for the team, had been working multiple jobs and donating blood plasma for money to pay for college while his mother fights polycystic kidney disease, which typically requires transplant surgery. Dooley, whose mother is a nurse and father is a truck driver, is a graduate student in his final season at Eastern Michigan. He's been a team captain for several years and played a leading role in helping the team make it to a bowl game this season. After giving away his scholarship, he is now paying for college with his own savings along with a loan his mother took out to help cover tuition and expenses. “I think it's just the beginning. If people see what I've done they might take it to a whole new level,” said Dooley. “I wish I could do more. To me it wasn't that big of a deal what I did. I was just doing it for one of my brothers. So, hopefully I can do a lot more now.”
2024	Megan Twist and Richard Bremer, Georgia Bulldogs fans
After being a life-long Florida Gators fan, Richard Bremer developed his intense love for the Georgia Bulldogs from a most unusual source – the compassionate spirit of a young University of Georgia fan and her lifesaving lung donation. Bremer's life was saved by Twist's decision to become an organ donor, and that led to Bremer relinquishing his long-time devotion to the Gators in favor of the rival Bulldogs as well as inspiring donations that are saving the lives of so many others. In 1996, Bremer, a carpenter from Jacksonville, Fla., was diagnosed with a degenerative lung disease called sarcoidosis. By 2012, his lung function had plummeted to just 20 percent, necessitating a lung transplant. After four years of waiting, he received a life-changing phone call that a match had been found. The donor was Twist, a 23-year-old from Georgia who was tragically killed in a car accident. Remarkably, Twist registered as an organ and tissue donor just a few months prior on her 23rd birthday. The surgery to save Bremer's life lasted 10 hours, and he was placed in a medically induced coma for several weeks. Upon waking and learning of Twist's loyalty to the Georgia Bulldogs, Bremer felt compelled to shift his own football loyalty to the Bulldogs in honor of her. Since the surgery, Bremer and Twist's family have been dedicated to raising awareness for organ donation. He has served as a spokesperson for LifeLink Foundation, a non-profit with a mission to help as many people as possible through organ and tissue transplantation. Bremer keeps a photo of Twist on his phone, which appears six times a day whenever his alarm goes off, reminding him to take his medications. "I celebrate (Twist's organ donation) every day when I wake up," said Bremer. "Getting to breathe every day, having her as a part of my life. She's with me every day. Getting to bring her to Walt Disney World with me and receive the Spirit Award, I'm carrying her spirit with me."
2025	Jeremiyah Love, Notre Dame
