= Downs Chapel, Delaware =

Unincorporated community in Delaware, United States

- Unincorporated community
- Location within Delaware Location within the United States
- Coordinates: 39°12′43″N 75°43′10″W
- Country: United States
- State: Delaware
- County: Kent
- Elevation: 66 ft (20 m)
- Time zone: UTC-5 (Eastern (EST))
  - Summer (DST): UTC-4 (EDT)
- Area code: 302
- GNIS feature ID: 213899

Downs Chapel is an unincorporated community in Kent County, Delaware, United States. Downs Chapel is located at the intersection of Delaware Route 300 and Downs Chapel Road, west of Kenton.

== History ==
Downs Chapel's population was 30 in 1890, 34 in 1900, and 20 in 1960.
