= Delaware Technical Community College =

Multi-campus public college in Delaware, US

Coordinates: 39.20003°N 75.55675°W

- Type: Public community college
- Established: 1966; 60 years ago
- Academic affiliations: Space-grant
- President: Mark T. Brainard
- Students: 14,029
- Location: Georgetown, Dover, Stanton, and Wilmington, Delaware, United States
- Colors: Green and blue
- Website: www.dtcc.edu
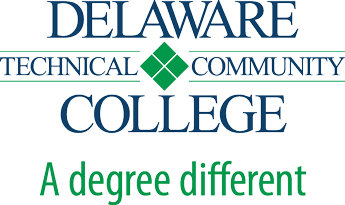

Delaware Technical Community College (previously Delaware Technical & Community College, also known as DTCC, Delaware Tech, or Del Tech) is a public community college in the U.S. state of Delaware. Delaware Tech is an open admission institution accredited by the Middle States Commission on Higher Education.

The college offers two Bachelor of Science degrees, more than 100 associate degrees, diplomas, and numerous certificate programs. Of these programs, 48 are accredited degree programs with articulation agreements with 61 other higher learning institutions. It is the only community college in the state. The four component campuses that make up the college are the Jack F. Owens Campus in Georgetown, Delaware, the Stanton Campus in Stanton, Delaware, the Charles L. Terry Campus in Dover, and the Orlando J. George Jr. Campus in Wilmington, Delaware.

== History ==
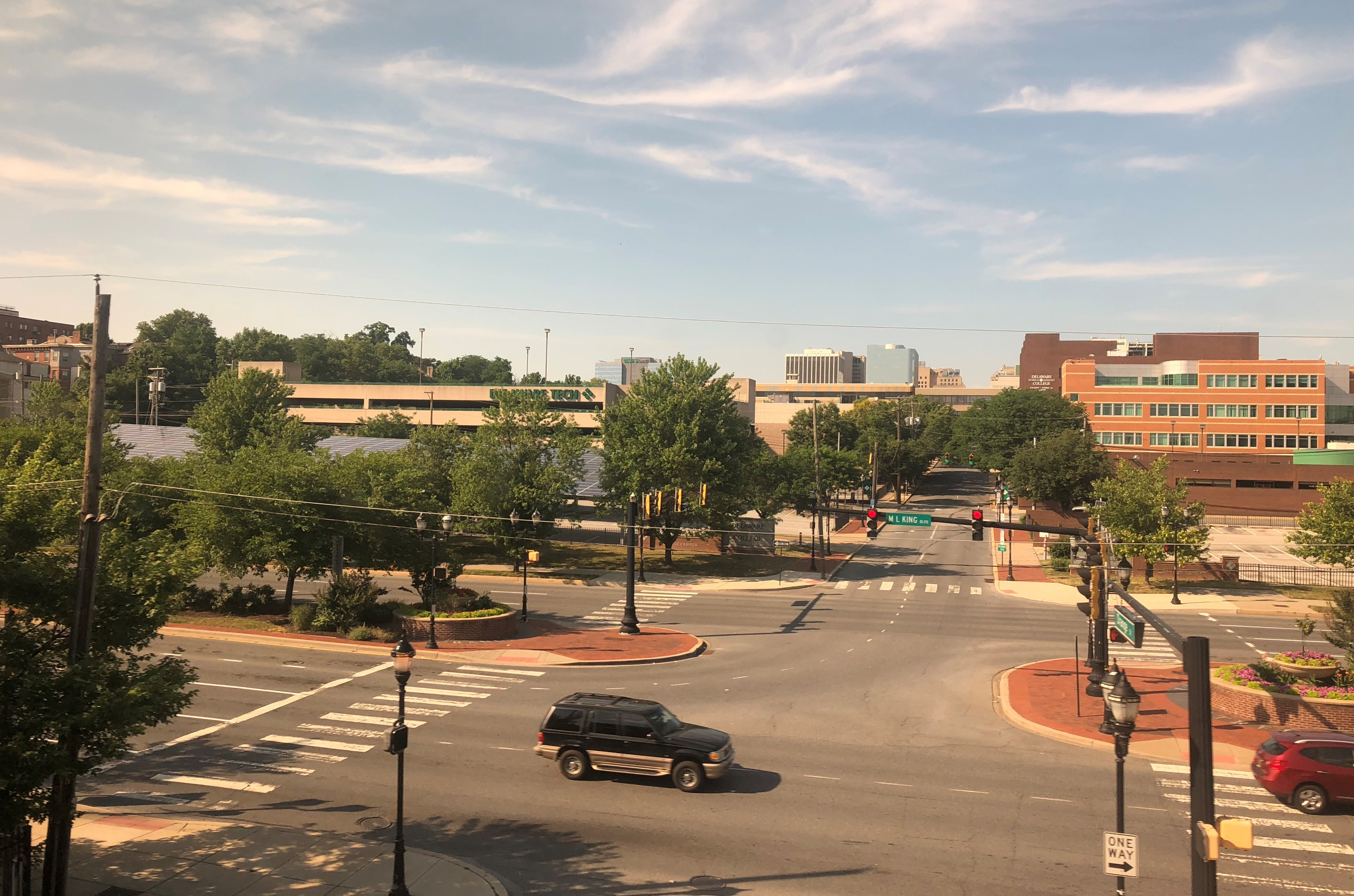
Buildings of the Wilmington Campus

The Delaware General Assembly created Delaware Technical Community College in 1966 with the approval of House Bill 529, signed into law by then-Governor Charles L. Terry, Jr. The first Delaware Tech campus opened its doors in Sussex County in September 1967, with Dr. Paul K. Weatherly serving as the first president. Three hundred sixty-seven students enrolled in the first year. Enrollment doubled in the second year, and the construction of new laboratories and classrooms began. The Southern Campus was renamed in 1995 to the "Owens Campus" in honor of its first campus director, Jack F. Owens. In 1968, a Northern Campus was opened with 375 full-time students enrolled in the first year. A multi-campus facility was created, and the Stanton and Wilmington locations were opened in 1973 and 1974, respectively. With a Delaware Tech campus in both Sussex and New Castle counties, 47% of high school juniors and seniors in Kent County said they would be interested in a Kent County branch of Delaware Tech. In response to this need, Kent Campus was established in Dover in 1972, and the name was later changed to "Terry Campus" in honor of Governor Charles Terry, who was a motivating force behind the establishment of the college. The President's Office, located adjacent to the Terry Campus, functions as a central office by providing various services in support of the campuses.

== Campuses ==
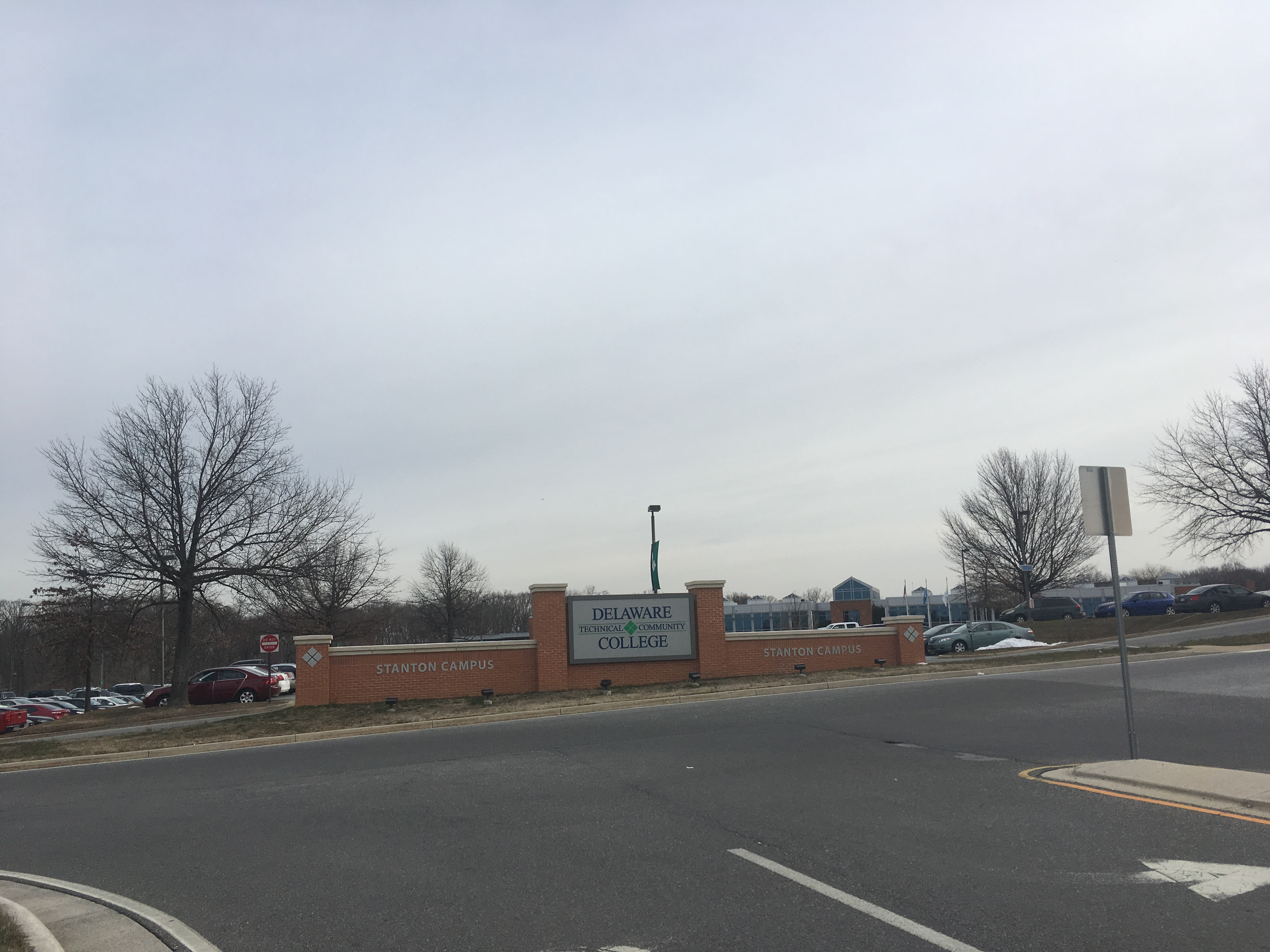
Entrance to the Stanton Campus

The college's campuses include:

- Charles L. Terry, Jr. Campus in Dover was named after Governor of Delaware Charles L. Terry. The 265,000-square-foot (24,600 m^{2}) facility is on a 112-acre (45 ha) property, in northern Dover. The campus includes the Del-One conference center.
- Owens Campus in Georgetown. It has 147 acres (59 ha) of land.
- Stanton Campus in Stanton, an unincorporated area (Newark postal address)
- Orlando J. George, Jr. Campus in Wilmington
- Middletown Training Center
Location of Delaware Technical Community College campuses

== Athletics ==
The Delaware Tech Athletic Department operates under the guidance of the Dean of Student Services and follows all bylaws and regulations established by the National Junior College Athletic Association Region XIX. Students interested in athletic participation must meet NJCAA eligibility requirements.

- The Owens Campus hosts the softball and baseball team practices. The baseball team won the 2001 NJCAA D2 World Series. Although the men's and women's cross country teams practice at all campuses, home meets are typically held at the Owens campus. The baseball and softball teams wear uniforms with blue as the primary color and green as the secondary color. The cross country teams wear green tops with blue bottoms. Teams based at the Owens campus informally use the nickname "Roadrunners".
- The Stanton campus hosts both men's and women's basketball team practices, and women's volleyball team practices. Delaware Tech teams based at the Stanton campus informally use the nickname "Spirit". The team colors are blue, green and white.
- The men's lacrosse team is based at the Terry Campus. Practices are held and home games are hosted at the DE Turf Sports Complex in Milford, Delaware, which is roughly equidistant from both the Terry and Owens campuses. The informal nickname for teams at the Terry campus is the "Hawks", and the primary team color is green, but both blue and green are used on the lacrosse team's uniforms.

== Academics ==
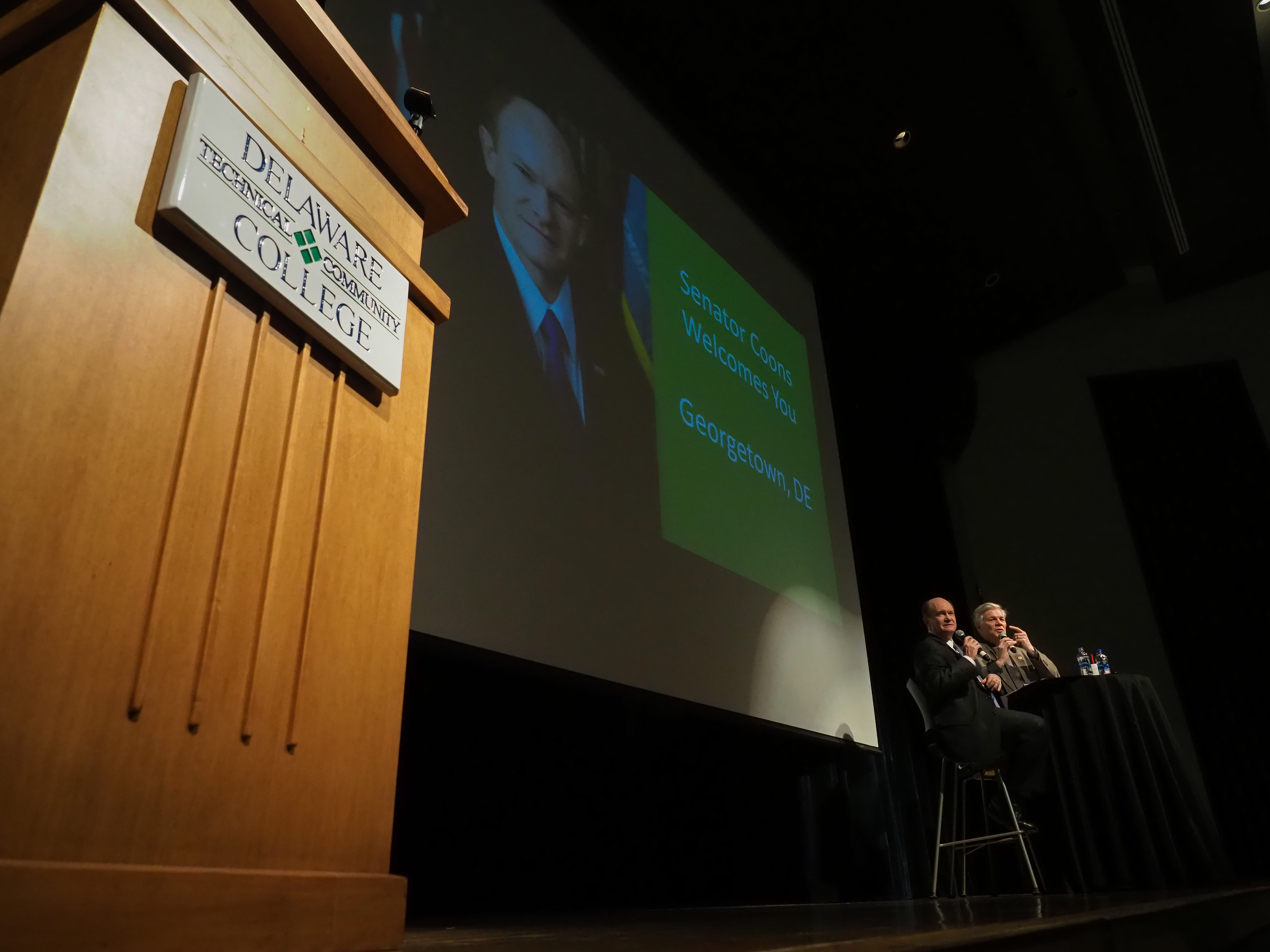
A town hall event being held at the Owens Campus in Georgetown

Delaware Technical Community College has "connected degree" agreements and programs with other higher education institutions in the state. Individuals may earn an associate degree at Del Tech and then transfer previously earned credits to other Delaware institutions, possibly at a lower cost. Of the more than 200 connected degree agreements, most are with are with the University of Delaware, Delaware State University, and Wilmington University.

In the 2019–2020 school year, 14,029 students were enrolled in Delaware Tech. The gender ratio for that year is ~0.65 female and ~0.35 male. Students out-of-state can be expected to take classes at 2.5 times the cost as in-state students. Although a more expensive option for out-of-state residents, in-state students are eligible to apply for the Delaware SEED Scholarship, which is intended to reduce the burden on the student to just books and course fees.

== Notable former faculty ==
- Jill Biden – English instructor, former First Lady of the United States

== Notable alumni ==
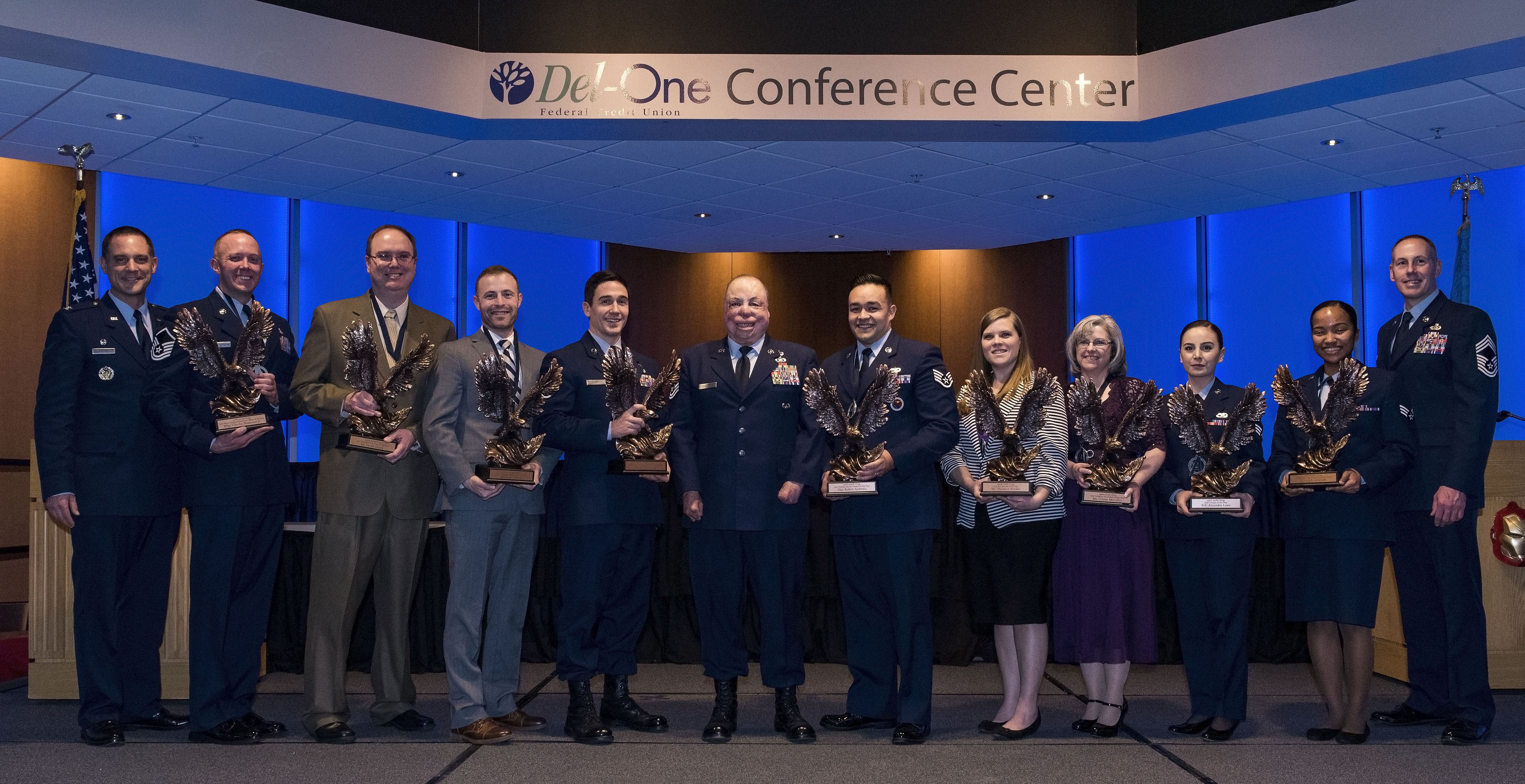
A U.S. military event held in a conference center at the Terry Campus in Dover

- James Hutchison – mayor of Dover, Delaware (1994–2004)
- Harvey Kenton – Delaware state representative (2011–2019)
- Ruth Ann Minner – governor of Delaware (2001–2009)
- Trinidad Navarro – insurance commissioner of Delaware
- Montrell Teague – harness racing driver
- Dennis P. Williams – mayor of Wilmington, Delaware (2013–2017)
