= Delaware Route 44 =

State highway in Delaware

Delaware Route 44

Route information
- Maintained by DelDOT
- Length: 6.65 mi (10.70 km)
- Existed: 1936–present

Major junctions
- West end: DE 300 in Everetts Corner
- DE 11 in Hartly
- East end: DE 8 in Pearsons Corner

Location
- Country: United States
- State: Delaware
- Counties: Kent

Highway system
- Delaware State Route System; List; Byways
← DE 42	→ DE 48

Delaware Route 44 (DE 44) is a state highway in Kent County, Delaware. It is signed east-west and runs from DE 300 at Everetts Corner southeast to DE 8 in Pearsons Corner. The route passes through rural areas of western Kent County as well as the town of Hartly. In Hartly, DE 44 intersects DE 11. The route was built as a state highway east of Hartly by 1924 and west of Hartly by 1932, receiving the DE 44 designation by 1936.

== Route description ==
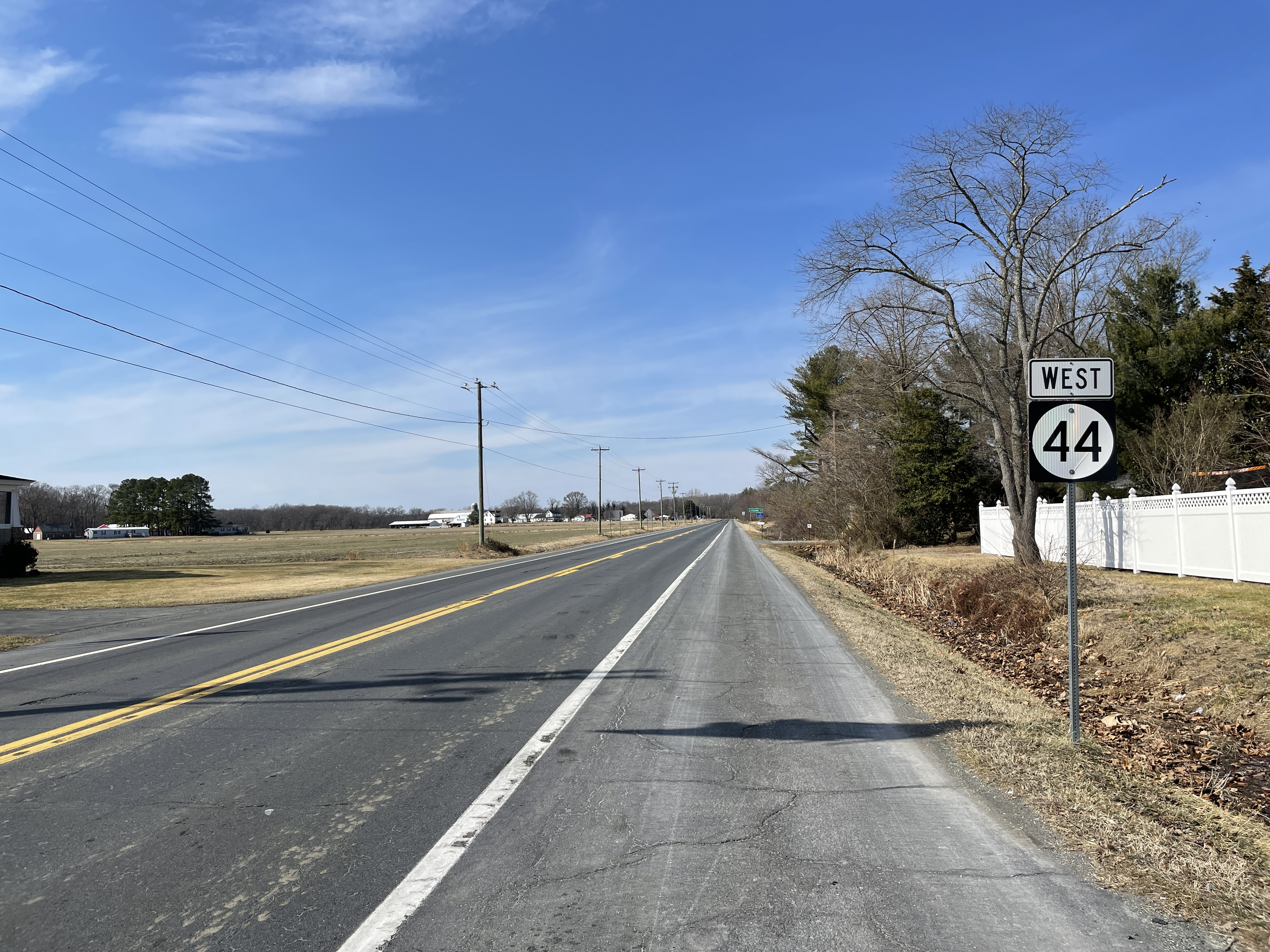
DE 44 westbound past DE 11 in Hartly

DE 44 heads to the southeast from DE 300 at Everetts Corner on two-lane undivided Everetts Corner Road. The road passes through a mix of woodland and farmland before reaching the town of Hartly. In Hartly, the route intersects DE 11, where it becomes Main Street, and passes by homes along with some commercial establishments, crossing an abandoned railroad line. The road then heads to the east out of Hartly as Hartly Road, passing through more rural areas. DE 44 continues to its eastern terminus at DE 8 in the community of Pearsons Corner.

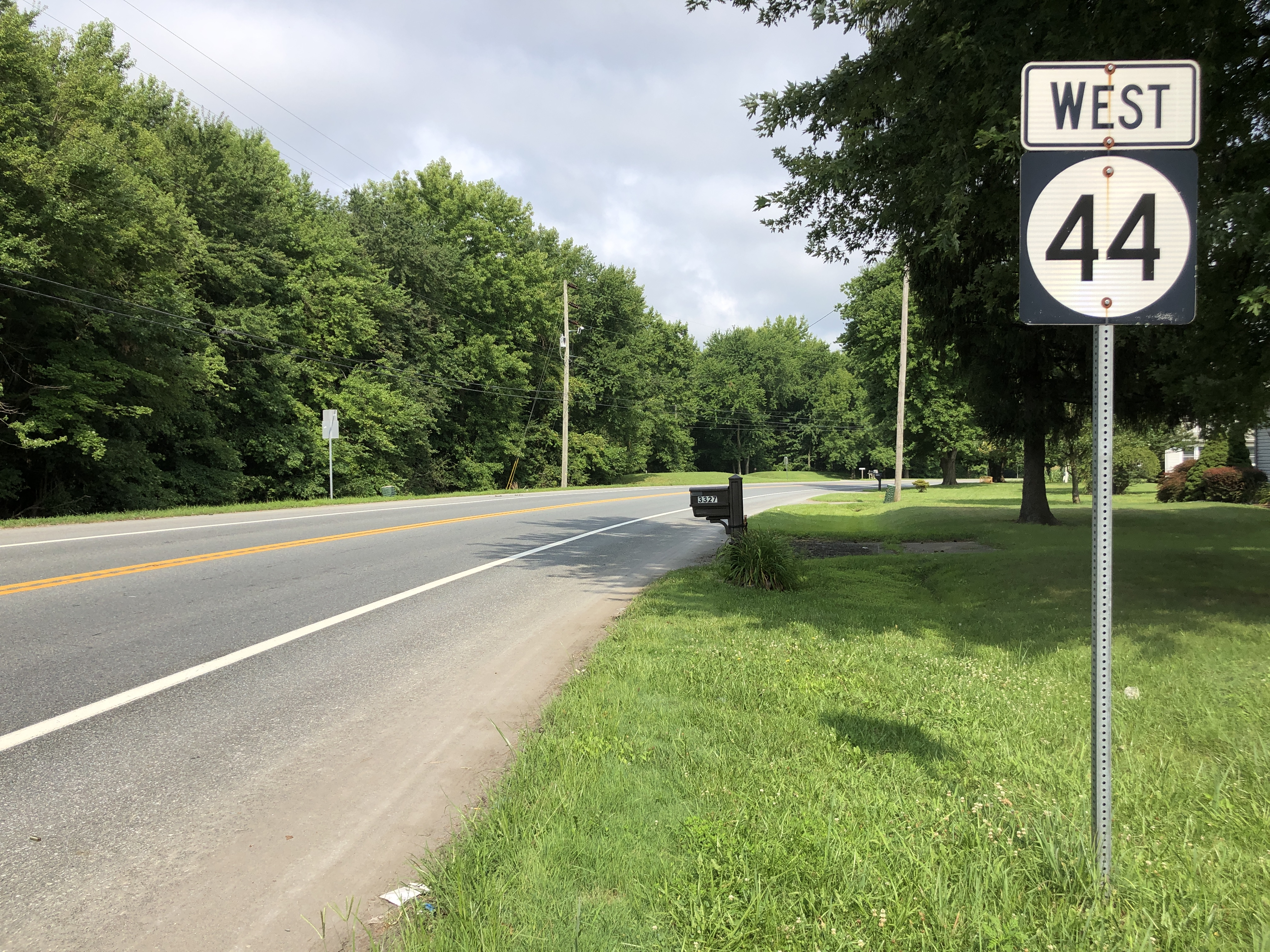
DE 44 westbound past DE 8 in Pearsons Corner

DE 44 has an annual average daily traffic count ranging from a high of 4,188 vehicles at the eastern terminus at DE 8 to a low of 1,565 vehicles at the western border of Hartly. The entire length of DE 44 is part of the National Highway System.

== History ==
By 1920, what is now DE 44 existed as an unimproved county road. The road east of Hartly was improved into a state highway by 1924. By 1932, the portion of road west of Hartly became a state highway. DE 44 was designated by 1936 to follow its current alignment. The route has not changed since its inception.

== Major intersections ==
The entire route is in Kent County.

Location	mi	km	Destinations	Notes
Everetts Corner	0.00	0.00	DE 300 (Sudlersville Road) – Sudlersville, Kenton, Smyrna	Western terminus
Hartly	2.89	4.65	DE 11 (Arthursville Road) – Kenton, Templeville	
Pearsons Corner	6.65	10.70	DE 8 (Halltown Road) – Marydel, Dover	Eastern terminus
1.000 mi = 1.609 km; 1.000 km = 0.621 mi
