= Hawkeye Wave =

American football sports tradition from 2017

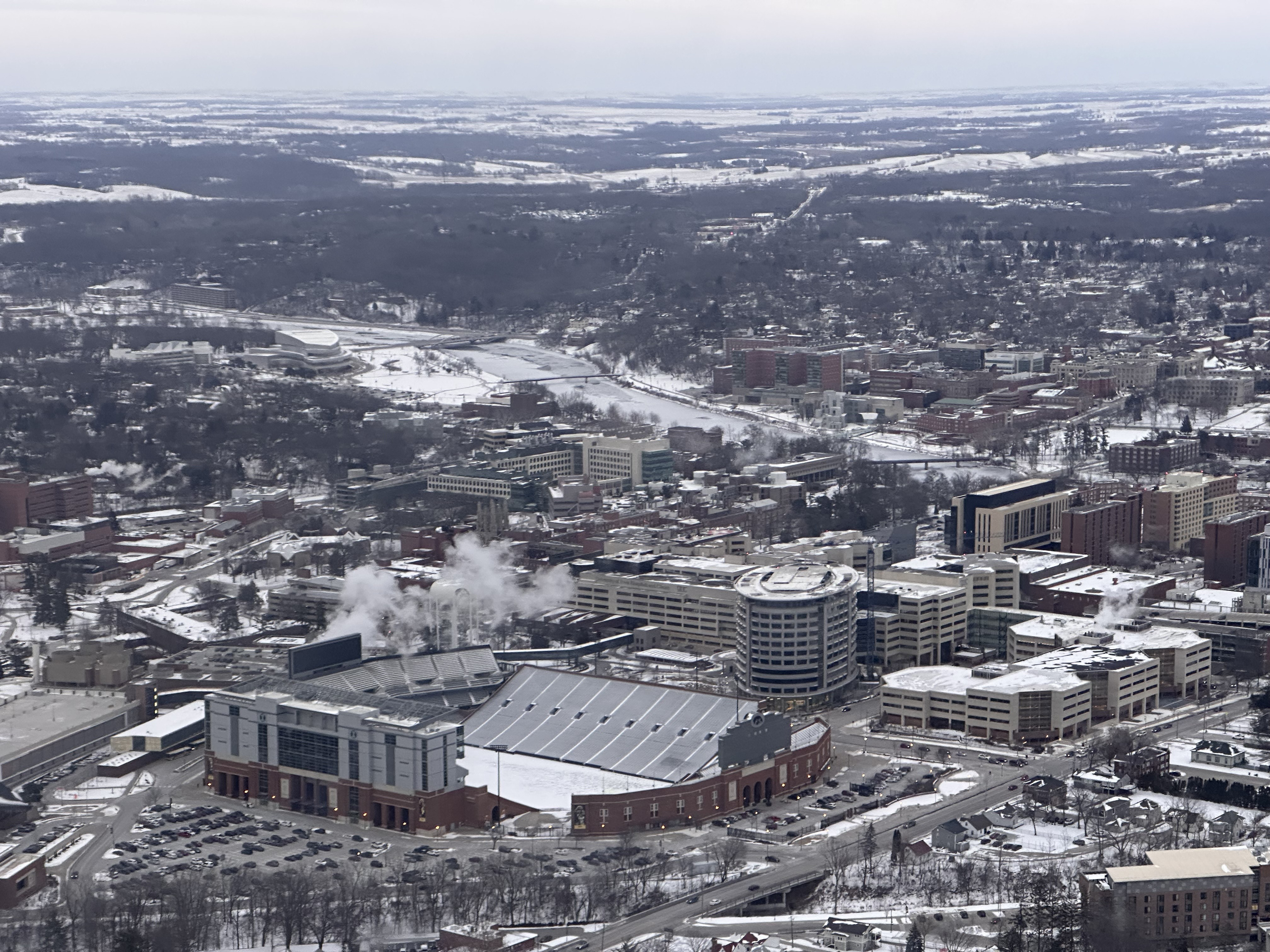
Aerial view of Iowa City, Iowa, with Kinnick Stadium in the foreground and the Stead Family Children's Hospital behind it.

The Hawkeye Wave also known as the "Iowa Wave" and the "Kinnick Wave", is a sports tradition originating from 2017, started by fans of the University of Iowa Hawkeyes football team at Kinnick Stadium during home games. According to tradition, at the end of the first quarter the fans, players, coaches and staff turn towards the 12th floor of the nearby University of Iowa Stead Family Children's Hospital, waving to the patients and their families standing by the window.

== History ==
In 2017, the University of Iowa Stead Family Children’s Hospital was completed with its 12th floor window overlooking Iowa's Kinnick Stadium. One of the team’s fans, Krista Young, came up with the idea and posted it to the Hawkeye Heaven Facebook fan page. The idea was promoted by the group maintainer both on the page and other online discussion boards. The idea was accepted by the university and other fans. The wave was performed for the first time during the 2017 college football season, quickly becoming a regular gesture during home games.

== Description ==
The Hawkeye Wave takes place at the end of the first quarter, as the stadium jumbotron and announcements encourage spectators to take part. About 70,000 people in the stands and team players, coaches, officials and staff members then turn to wave towards the hospital’s 12th floor window at children and their families looking on from a designated viewing area. From 2017 to 2022, the stadium's PA system played “Wave on Wave” by Country music singer Pat Green during the wave. From 2022 onwards, selected pediatric patients at every home Hawkeye football game selects the song that plays during the Hawkeye Wave.

== Reception and significance ==
The Hawkeye Wave has won national praise from news networks, commentators, and fans as an example of sportsmanship and community engagement. Players and fans of opposite teams take part in this tradition, that has been described as a notable tradition of college football. The Hawkeye Wave tradition won the 2017 Disney's Wide World of Sports Spirit Award.
