= Delaware Route 11 =

State highway in Kent County, Delaware, United States

Delaware Route 11
- Arthursville Road

Route information
- Maintained by DelDOT
- Length: 6.93 mi (11.15 km)
- Existed: 1936–present

Major junctions
- South end: MD 302 near Templeville, MD
- DE 44 in Hartly
- North end: DE 300 near Kenton

Location
- Country: United States
- State: Delaware
- Counties: Kent

Highway system
- Delaware State Route System; List; Byways
← DE 10	→ DE 12

Delaware Route 11 (DE 11) is a state highway in Kent County, Delaware. It is signed north–south and runs from Maryland Route 302 (MD 302) at the Maryland border near Templeville, Maryland, northeast to DE 300 near Kenton. The road, known as Arthursville Road for its entire length, passes through farmland in western Kent County and through the town of Hartly, where it intersects DE 44. The route was built as a state highway in the 1920s and 1930s and received the DE 11 designation by 1936.

== Route description ==
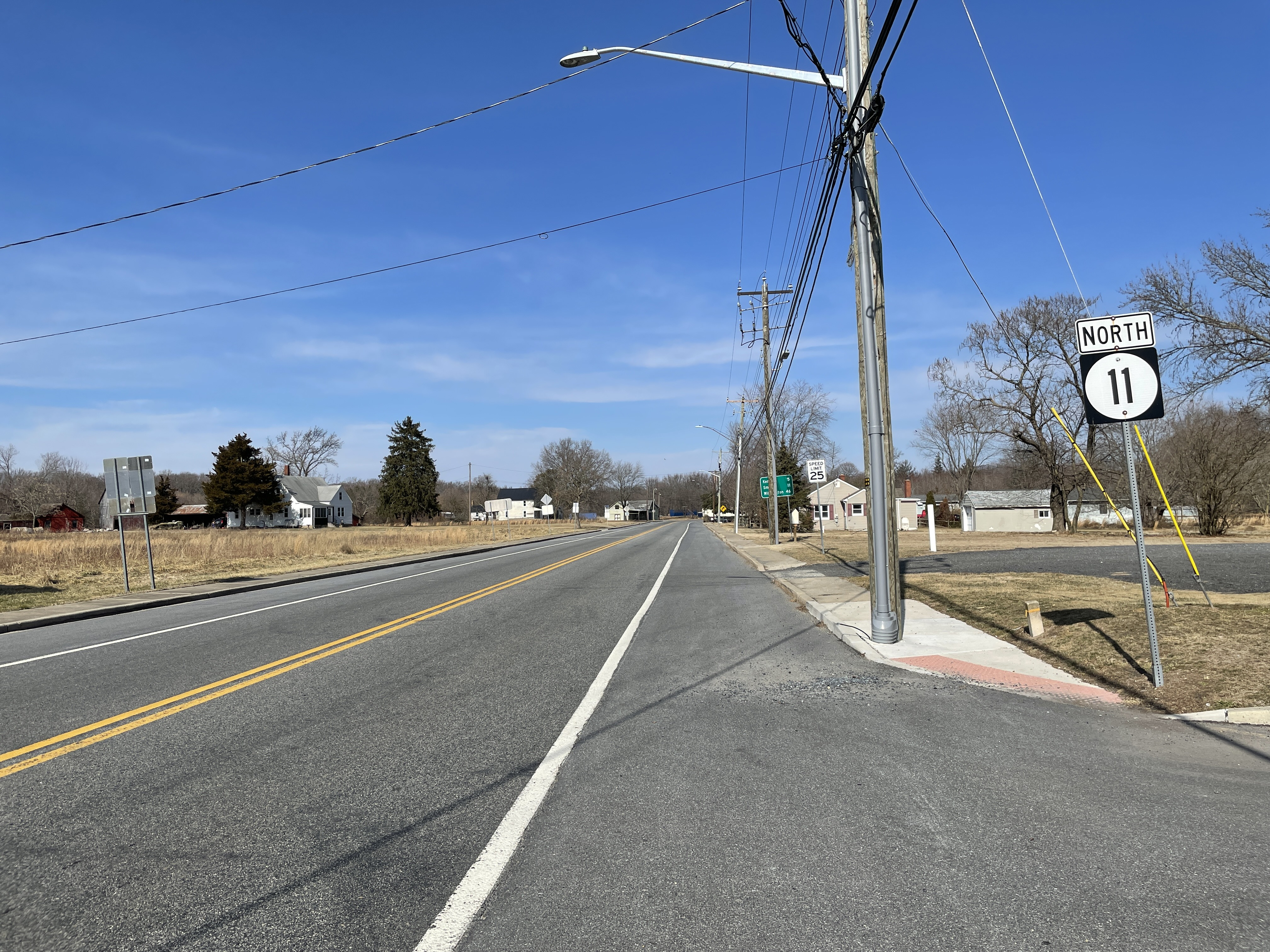
DE 11 northbound past DE 44 in Hartly

DE 11 begins at the Maryland border in western Kent County, where the road continues west into that state as MD 302 toward the town of Templeville. From the state line, DE 11 heads northeast on two-lane, undivided Arthursville Road through a mix of woods and farms with occasional residences. The road enters the town of Hartly, where it passes several homes along with some commercial establishments. In the center of town, the route crosses DE 44 and heads north before it curves northeast out of Hartly. DE 11 continues into rural areas with some residences, making another turn north. The road runs northeast and crosses Jordan Branch and Pinks Branch before it comes to an end at DE 300 to the southwest of the town of Kenton.

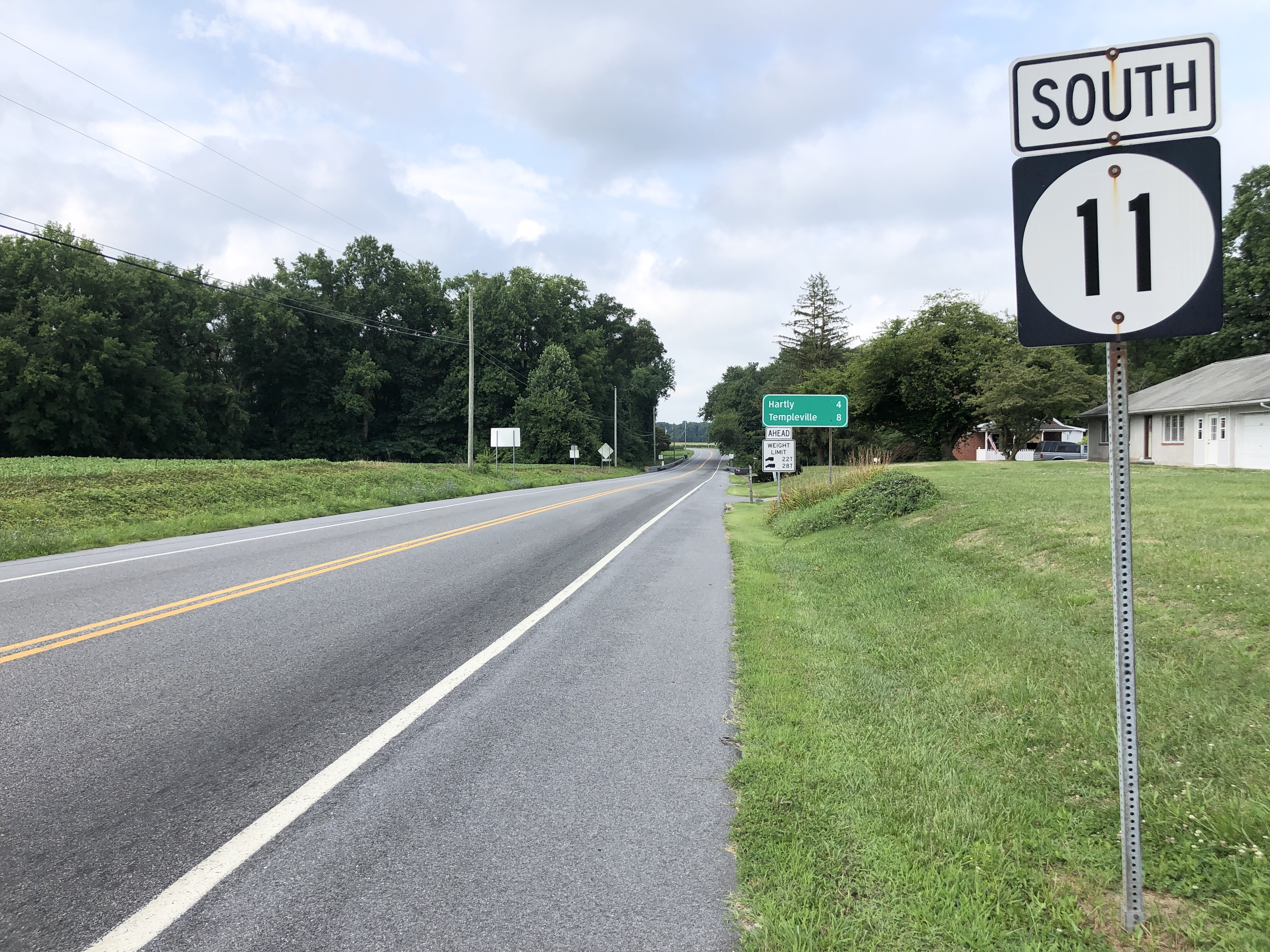
DE 11 southbound past DE 300 near Kenton

DE 11 has an annual average daily traffic count ranging from a high of 2,543 vehicles at the north end of Hartly to a low of 1,503 vehicles at the south end of Hartly.

== History ==
By 1920 what is now DE 11 existed as an unimproved county road. The portion of the route north of Hartly was built as a paved state highway in 1927. The road south of Hartly was taken over by the state and paved by 1931. DE 11 was assigned to its current alignment by 1936. The route has not changed since its inception.

== Major intersections ==
The entire route is in Kent County.

Location	mi	km	Destinations	Notes
	0.00	0.00	MD 302 west (Barclay Road) – Templeville	Maryland state line; southern terminus
Hartly	2.58	4.15	DE 44 (Everetts Corner Road/Main Street) – Sudlersville, Dover	
	6.93	11.15	DE 300 (Sudlersville Road) – Kenton, Smyrna, Wilmington	Northern terminus
1.000 mi = 1.609 km; 1.000 km = 0.621 mi
