= Delaware Route 300 =

State highway in Kent County, Delaware, United States

Delaware Route 300

Route information
- Maintained by DelDOT
- Length: 11.83 mi (19.04 km)
- Existed: 1936–present

Major junctions
- West end: MD 300 near Everetts Corner
- DE 44 in Everetts Corner; DE 11 near Kenton; DE 42 in Kenton; DE 15 near Clayton; DE 6 in Smyrna
- East end: US 13 / DE 6 in Smyrna

Location
- Country: United States
- State: Delaware
- Counties: Kent

Highway system
- Delaware State Route System; List; Byways
← DE 299	→ US 301

Delaware Route 300 (DE 300) is an 11.83-mile-long (19.04 km) state highway in Kent County, Delaware. The route is a continuation of Maryland Route 300 (MD 300) from the Maryland border near Everetts Corner. It runs in a northeast direction from there to the town of Smyrna, where it ends at U.S. Route 13 (US 13) while concurrent with DE 6. The route is signed east-west. Along the way, DE 300 passes through rural areas of northern Kent County as well as the towns of Kenton and Clayton. The road intersects DE 44 at Everetts Corner, DE 11 southwest of Kenton, DE 42 in Kenton, DE 15 between Kenton and Clayton, and DE 6 in Smyrna. The road was first built as a state highway in the 1920s and 1930s between the Maryland border and Clayton, with the DE 300 designation given to the road by 1936. The route was extended to its current terminus in the 1950s.

== Route description ==
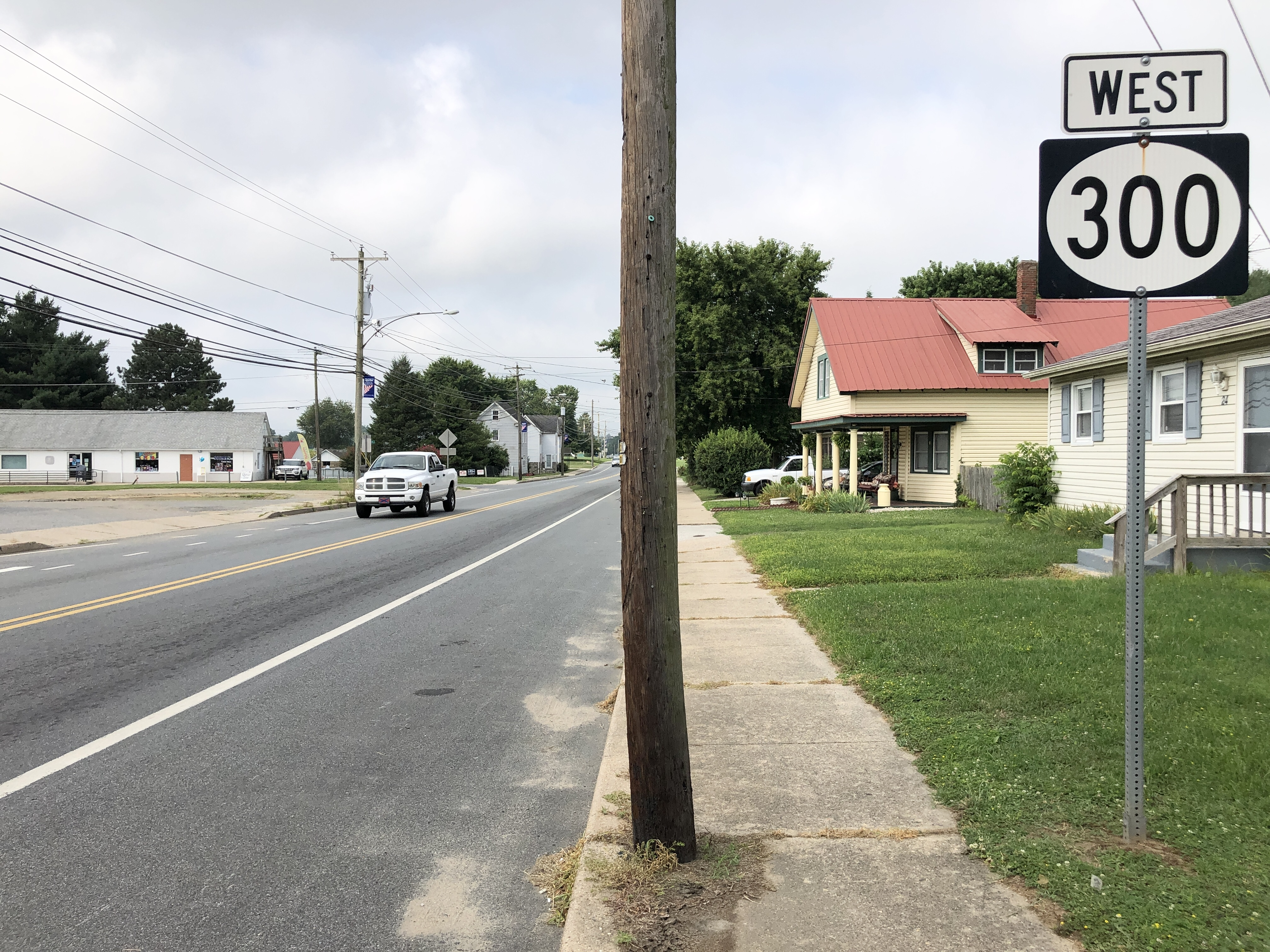
DE 300 westbound past DE 42 in Kenton

DE 300 begins at the Maryland border, where the road continues west into that state as MD 300. From the state line, the route heads east on two-lane undivided Sudlersville Road through agricultural areas and woods with some homes. A short distance after the state line, the road intersects the western terminus of DE 44 at Everetts Corner. DE 300 continues east-northeast through rural areas, passing through the community of Downs Chapel and crossing Jordan Branch. Farther east, the road intersects the northern terminus of DE 11. The route curves northeast, crossing an abandoned railroad line before entering the town of Kenton. At this point, the road becomes Main Street and passes homes along with a few businesses, intersecting DE 42 in the center of town.

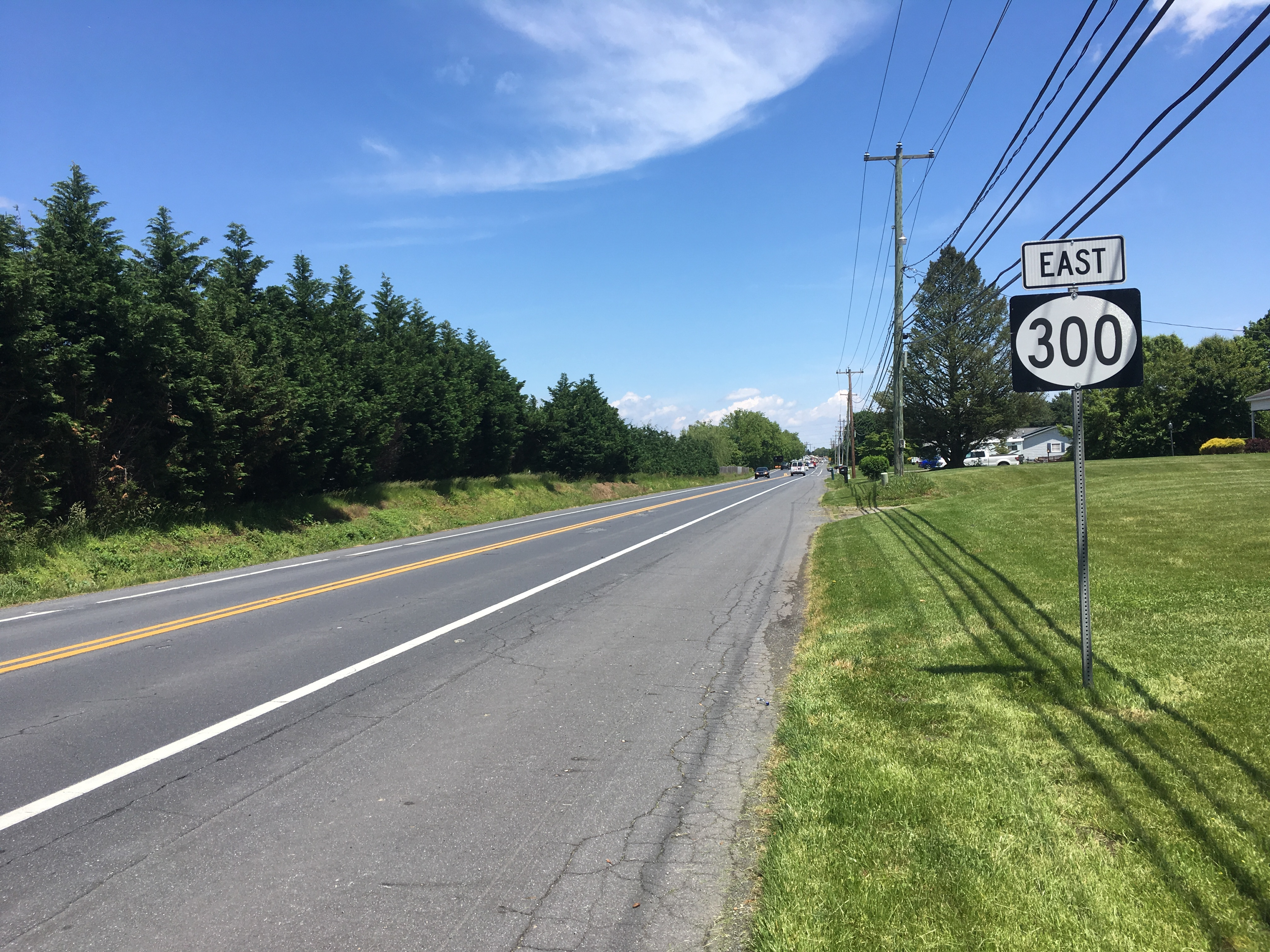
DE 300 eastbound in Clayton

Past Kenton, DE 300 continues northeast on Wheatleys Pond Road, passing through more farm fields, some woodland, and residences. The road forms a brief concurrency with DE 15 before heading north and crossing Mill Creek. DE 300 enters the town of Clayton and passes residential subdivisions, curving northeast. The road crosses the Delmarva Central Railroad's Delmarva Subdivision line at-grade, where it becomes the border between Clayton to the northwest and the town of Smyrna to the southeast, and runs north of industrial areas. The route continues past a mix of homes and businesses, heading into Smyrna and passing northwest of Bayhealth Emergency Center, Smyrna before intersecting DE 6. At this point, DE 6 turns northeast and forms a concurrency with DE 300 on West Glenwood Avenue. The two routes pass a mix of homes and businesses before gaining a center left-turn lane past the Main Street junction and entering a commercial area in the northern part of Smyrna as East Glenwood Avenue. Here, the road widens into a divided highway before it intersects US 13. At this point, DE 300 ends and DE 6 turns southeast to form a concurrency with US 13.

DE 300 has an annual average daily traffic count ranging from a high of 15,378 vehicles at the eastern terminus at US 13 to a low of 2,686 vehicles at the DE 44 intersection. The portion of DE 300 between the Maryland border and DE 44 is part of the National Highway System.

== History ==
By 1920, what is now DE 300 existed as an unimproved county road. The road was completed as a state highway between Kenton and Clayton and was proposed as one west of Kenton four years later. By 1931, the entire route between Clayton and the Maryland border was completed as a state highway. DE 300 was designated between the Maryland border and an intersection with DE 6 between Clayton and Smyrna by 1936. By 1954, DE 300 was extended east to its present terminus at US 13 in Smyrna. By the 1990s, DE 6 was routed along DE 300 in Smyrna, bypassing the downtown area.

== Major intersections ==
The entire route is in Kent County.

Location	mi	km	Destinations	Notes
	0.00	0.00	MD 300 west (Sudlersville Road) – Sudlersville, Bay Bridge	Maryland state line; western terminus
Everetts Corner	0.33	0.53	DE 44 east (Everetts Corner Road) – Hartly, Dover	Western terminus of DE 44
	4.54	7.31	DE 11 south (Arthursville Road) – Hartly	Northern terminus of DE 11
Kenton	5.32	8.56	DE 42 (Commerce Street) – Blackiston, Cheswold	
			DE 15 south (Mt. Friendship Road)	West end of DE 15 overlap
			DE 15 north (Alley Corner Road)	East end of DE 15 overlap
Smyrna	10.73	17.27	DE 6 west (Smyrna Clayton Boulevard) – Clayton	West end of DE 6 overlap
Smyrna	11.83	19.04	US 13 / DE 6 east (North Dupont Boulevard) – Wilmington, Dover	Eastern terminus
1.000 mi = 1.609 km; 1.000 km = 0.621 mi: Concurrency terminus
