= Dover High School (Delaware) =

Location
- 1 Dover High Drive; Dover, Delaware 19904; United States; 39°10′35″N 75°32′21″W

Information
- Type: Public secondary
- Established: 1965; 61 years ago
- School district: Capital School District
- CEEB code: 080030
- Principal: Shawndell Solomon
- Teaching staff: 99.27 (FTE)
- Grades: 9–12
- Enrollment: 1,867 (2023-2024)
- Student to teacher ratio: 18.81
- Campus type: Urban
- Colors: Blue and white
- Athletics conference: Henlopen Conference - Northern Division
- Mascot: Senator
- Yearbook: The Doverian
- Website: doverhigh.capital.k12.de.us

Dover High School is a high school located in Dover, Delaware. It is a part of the Capital School District.

Communities served include the majority of Dover, as well as Cheswold, Hartly, Little Creek, and about half of Leipsic.

Dover High School's principal is Shawndell Solomon.

== Special programs ==
Dover High School offers a program for students to become certified nursing assistants.

Since 2006, members of Dover High's Japanese Club have participated in a cultural exchange program with its sister school located in Kakuda, Japan.

== Referendum ==
A 2010 Capital School District referendum on funding for a new Dover High School and renovation of other district schools passed on March 31. Construction of the new school began in the spring of 2011, and was completed in the fall of 2014.

== Awards and achievements ==
In 2009 a record-breaking number of AP Scholars were recognized at the school. A total of 49 students were named for 2010, with two of them also being named as National AP Scholars.

Dover High School was recognized as a National Blue Ribbon School of Excellence in 1986.

The school made Newsweek's list of America's Best High Schools for five straight years, beginning in 2006. Below is a table of Newsweek's ratings of Dover High School.

Year	Rank	Challenge Index rating
2006	1201	1.013
2007	993	1.311
2008	858	1.525
2009	904	1.647
2010	744	1.974

Dover High School's BPA team performed well at the 2010 National Leadership Conference, placing 6th in Fundamentals of Web Design, 1st in PC Servicing and Troubleshooting, 3rd in Network Design, and 9th in Small Business Management.

The school entered the Odyssey of the Mind, and placed 7th in the World Finals in 2009.

== Notable alumni ==
=== Arts and entertainment ===
- Robert Crumb, cartoonist, graduated in 1961
- Ukee Washington, newscaster
- Bryan Gordon, writer, producer, director
- Kayla Martell, Miss Delaware 2010
- Teri Polo, actress, model
- Diana Son, playwright and TV producer
- Rob Tornoe, nationally-syndicated cartoonist

=== Politics ===
- Robin Christiansen (1968), mayor of Dover since 2014, city councilman from 1983 to 2001, and council president and vice mayor from 1990 to 2001
- James Hutchison (1961), first full-time mayor of Dover, and city councilman
- Gary Traynor, associate justice of the Delaware Supreme Court

=== Space ===
- Andrew R. Morgan (1994), astronaut, class of 2013

=== Sports ===
- Hameen Ali, college football player honored for persevering through difficult life circumstances
- Renie Martin, pitcher for the Kansas City Royals and San Francisco Giants from 1979 to 1984
- Jordan Magee, NFL linebacker for the Washington Commanders; played college football at Temple

== See also ==
- List of high schools in Delaware
