= National College Football Awards Association =

College football award association

The National College Football Awards Association (NCFAA) was founded in 1997 as a coalition of major United States college football awards. The stated purpose of the NCFAA is to protect, preserve and enhance the integrity, influence and prestige of college football's various awards. The NCFAA also encourages professionalism and the highest standards possible for the administration of college football awards and the selection of their winners. The 25 awards are considered among the most prestigious in college football.

== Members of the NCFAA ==
- Bednarik Award (defensive player)
- Fred Biletnikoff Award (receiver)
- Bronko Nagurski Trophy (defensive player)
- Broyles Award (assistant coach)
- Burlsworth Trophy (player who began his career as a walk-on)
- Butkus Award (linebacker)
- Davey O'Brien Award (quarterback)
- Disney Spirit Award (inspirational player, team or figure)
- Doak Walker Award (running back)
- Eddie Robinson Award (national coach of the year)
- George Munger Award (head coach)
- Heisman Trophy (outstanding player)
- John Mackey Award (tight end)
- Lou Groza Award (place-kicker)
- Maxwell Award (best player)
- Outland Trophy presented by NFID (interior lineman)
- Paul Hornung Award (most versatile)
- Paycom Jim Thorpe Award (defensive back)
- Ray Guy Award (punter)
- Rimington Trophy (center)
- Stallings Award (humanitarian coach)
- Uplifting Athletes (player impacting rare disease research)
- Walter Camp Award (player of the year)
- William V. Campbell Trophy (scholar-athlete, "academic Heisman")
- Wuerffel Trophy (exemplary community service with athletic and academic achievement)
