= Pearsons Corner, Delaware =

- Unincorporated community
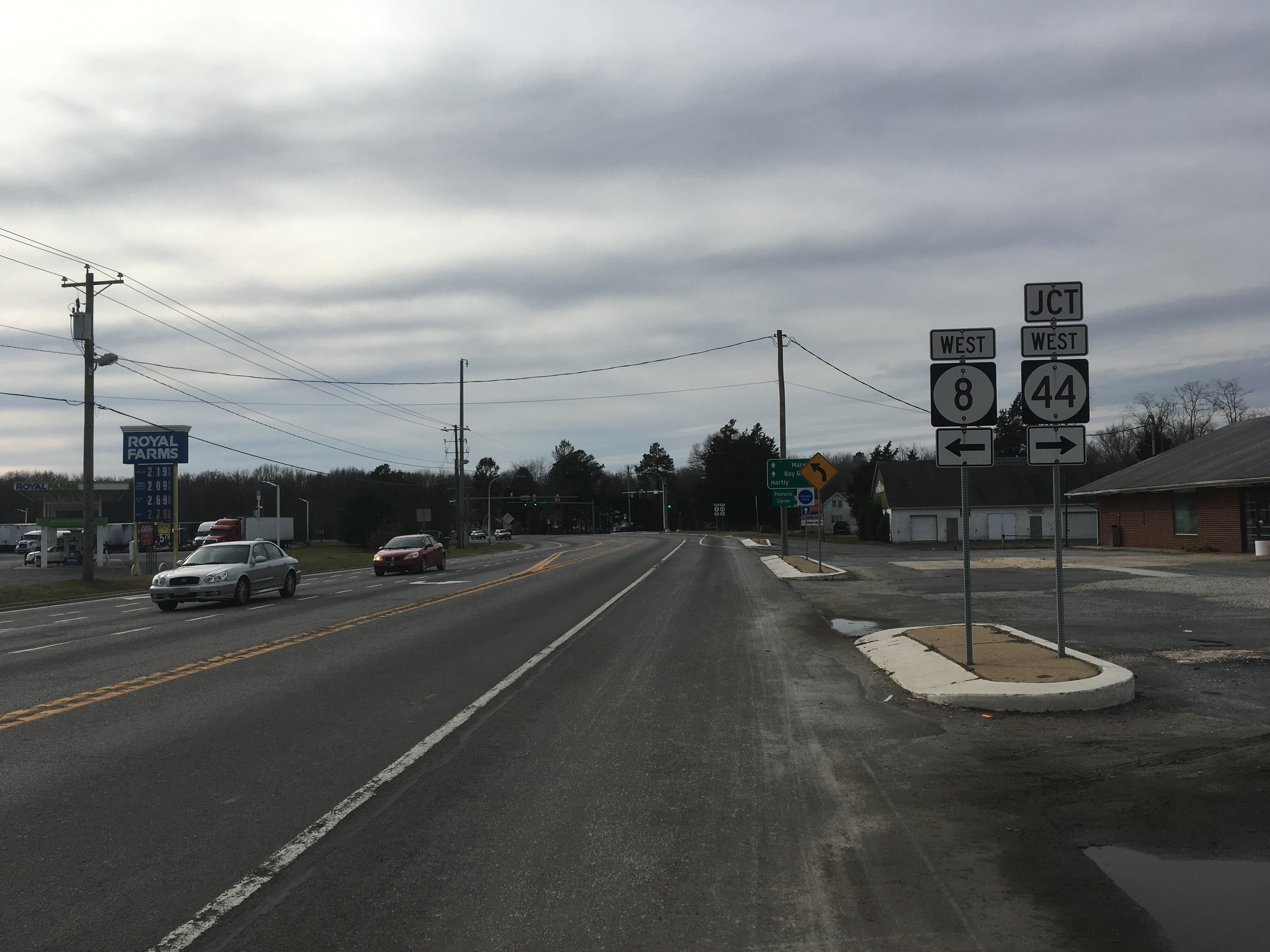
- Westbound Delaware Route 8 in Pearsons Corner

- Location within Delaware Location within the United States
- Coordinates: 39°9′14″N 75°38′59″W
- Country: United States
- State: Delaware
- County: Kent
- Elevation: 66 ft (20 m)
- Time zone: UTC-5 (Eastern (EST))
  - Summer (DST): UTC-4 (EDT)
- Area code: 302
- GNIS feature ID: 216176

Pearsons Corner is an unincorporated community in Kent County, Delaware, United States. Pearsons Corner is located at the intersection of state routes 8 and 44, west of Dover.

== History of Pearsons Corner ==
In 2009 a cultural resource survey was undertaken by the Delaware Department of Transportation. This survey has illuminated early life in Pearsons Corner. Much of the following information is extracted from this report.

=== Early history of Kent County ===
Pearson's Corner is located in West Dover Hundred, Kent County, Delaware, approximately ten miles west of Dover. What is now Kent County was originally part of the Whorekill County, as it was named by early Dutch settlers. It became an independent territory under the name St. Jones County in 1680 and was transferred to William Penn in 1682. Though there is no extant record of the change of name to Kent County, historian J. Scharf contends that it was likely done at the time of this transfer. There were few settlers and no village of real importance in St. Jones/Kent County in the 17th century. A census taken just after the formation of the county in 1680 enumerated only 99 people and subsequent settlement occurred slowly, driven mostly by migrants from Maryland who settled along the streams and waterways of central Delaware (Scharf 1888:1028-1029).

=== 19th-century development ===
In the early 19th century a new road was laid out connecting the Road from Dover to the Horse Head to the community at Dinah's Crossroads to the north. The area of present-day Pearson's Corner continued to be marked by large farms as the Rash and Pearson families became increasingly strong presences in the community.

By the second half of the 19th century, a road had been constructed from Pearson's Corner south to Hazlettville (or George Town) and a small village had coalesced at the crossroads formed by this road and the road to Dover. By the middle of the 19th century, the intersection was home to dwellings as well as a blacksmith and wheelwright shop, store and granary that served both the rural community and travelers. The roads leading away from Pearson's Corner were dotted with scattered farmsteads.

Before Joseph Rash Sr. died in 1837, he had sold a 15-acre (6.1 ha) parcel at what is now the northeast corner of Pearson's Corner to Joseph Rash Jr. (Kent County Deed S2/214). After his death, the remainder of Joseph Rash Sr.’s 300-acre tract was divided into four smaller farms. A 60-acre parcel adjacent to the aforesaid 15-acre tract was devised to John H. Rash who subsequently purchased the 15-acre parcel from the heirs of Joseph Rash, Jr. Thus, by 1840 John H. Rash owned a contiguous 75-acre (30 ha) farm at the northeast corner of Pearson’s Corner. In 1845, John H. Rash sold the farm to Moses Rash who owned the property until his death in 1887 (Kent County Deeds P3/117 and A4/61). Moses Rash was a farmer who cultivated grain and fruit for the market. He erected a “fine residence” on his property in 1849 (J.M. Runk & Co. 1899:1370) and Price and Rea's map of Delaware confirms that a dwelling was certainly standing on the property by 1850. Located approximately on the lot at present 5752 Forrest Avenue, this dwelling remained standing into the 20th century. In 1846 Elijah Crouch purchased the 100-acre farm that had previously been laid off to Elizabeth Course in Elizabeth Roe's will, from John and Elizabeth Jones, the heirs of John Jones. Though a dwelling house existed on the property when the Kent County Orphans Court ordered the division of the lot in 1839, it is unknown whether this dwelling was standing at the time of Crouch's purchase. Regardless, Crouch built a new dwelling house on the property between 1850 and 1859 and this house is still standing today at 3299 Hartly Road. Crouch also built a house on the south side of the road from Dover to the Horse Head between 1850 and 1859, but this house was removed by 1868.

In 1870, William Pearson sold 108 acres of his farm on the south side of the Horse Head Road to Abraham Pearson. This farm had previously been the residence of William Pearson, but was at the time of sale already in Abraham Pearson's possession. Five years later, William Pearson sold a house lot on the southeast corner of Pearson's Corner, bounded on the north by the Road to Dover, on the west by the road to Hazlettville and on the south and east by the 108-acre farm William Pearson had previously sold to Abraham Pearson (Kent County Deeds T5/162 and M5/12). Thus, until it was divided from the larger farm tract in 1870 this small lot at the southeast corner of Pearson's Corner had been part of a much larger farm that centered on a farmhouse located to the east. Although it existed as a part of a larger farm tract, a building was standing at the southeast corner of Pearson's corner as early as 1850. A.D. Byles’ Map of Kent County, Delaware (1859), which identifies the building as a “store” provides the earliest evidence of the building's use. A deed from the 1875 sale of the corner lot from William Pearson to Abraham Pearson described the property as containing “several improvements now enjoyed by the said John Pearson as tenant under the said William Pearson Sr.” (Kent County Deed T5/162). A plot accompanying the Delaware General Assembly's Act to Straighten a Road from Pearson's Corner to Hazlettville identifies the building as “Pearson’s House”. The earliest architectural description of the Pearson store uncovered in the course of this research is found in an 1899 deed of sale for the adjacent farm in which one boundary of the farm is described as “the said small lot of land containing about three-quarters of an-acre and which said small lot of land has erected thereon a three story framed building used as a store and dwelling house.” At the time the house and store lot was occupied by Willard S. Carson (Kent County Deed E8/407).

=== 20th-century development ===
At the beginning of the 20th century, Pearson's Corner still existed as a rural crossroads village. But as the century progressed, changes and improvements to the road network and the pressures of post-World War II suburban development would alter, but not destroy, the historic character of the community.

==== Amish settlement ====
In 1915, the first Amish settlement in Kent County started when the families of Bishop David Y. Miller and Jacob K. Miller arrived in Delaware. They had moved to the state from the west and settled near Dover in East Dover Hundred. These families were soon joined by the family of William Beachy and several others and by 1916 five Amish families had settled in the area. They were drawn to the state by the availability of good level land at reasonable prices and the large acreage of fruit crops the ground supported. Though some families left – like the Beachys who soon made plans to move to Oregon – enough Amish families continued to move into Delaware to steadily grow the community. By 1924, sixteen Amish families lived in the state – a number that grew to 111 families by 1988. Since the 1980s, the growth of Amish farms along the road from Hartly to Dover has been limited due to industrial expansion. Many farmers have moved from fruit and vegetable production to grain production and also established small shops to maintain economic viability (Clark 1988; Hostetler and Yoder 1990).

==== Old Pearson Store ====
The old Pearson store and house had been torn down or otherwise removed from the lot at the southeastern corner of Pearson's Corner by 1922. That year, the Delaware State Highway Department drew plans for the widening of the road from Dover to Pearson's Corner. Though these plans do depict buildings, there is nothing shown on the southeastern corner of Pearson's Corner. It is likely that Willard C. Hurd constructed the building that now stands at the southeastern corner of Pearson's corner shortly after he purchased the property in 1923, as an aerial photograph shows a building on the lot in 1926 (Kent County Deed K12/293). By 1933, Hurd's property contained a two-story frame store, two gasoline pumps and a corn crib and shed.

==== Changes to the road network ====
The single greatest change to the landscape of Pearson's Corner in the 20th century was the construction of Delaware Route 8 (Halltown Road) between Pearson's Corner and Marydel. The Delaware State Highway Department granted Contract CK-9 to Harrison Engineering & Construction Corporation of Buffalo, New York on March 29, 1922, for work on a 6.2-mile section of roadway between Marydel and Pearson's Corner (Delaware State Highway Department 1922). Between 1939 and 1941, the Delaware State Highway Department widened State Routes 44 and 8 by four to six feet between Dover and Everett's Corner. Touted as a “long-awaited improvement,” the first contract for the widening of State Route 44 between Dover and Pearson's Corner was completed in 1939 (Delaware State Highway Department 1939), and the improvements to the section of State Route 8 between Pearson's Corner and Everett's Corner were completed two years later (Delaware State HighwayDepartment 1941).

==== Post-World War Two residential and commercial development ====
With increased access to the Pearson's Corner area and the pressures of the suburban housing boom driving up land prices in Kent County, Ralph J. Vincent began subdividing and selling his 89-acre farm at Pearson's Corner (see Kent County Deeds T18/382, K19/361, I21/337 and K21/462). The first new houses to be constructed on the former Vincent farm were located on the northwest side of Delaware Route 8 (6401 and 6417 Halltown Road). Completed by 1952, these two small dwellings are depicted on the Delaware State Highway Department's plans for improvements to Mardyel-Pearson's Corner Road. By 1961, the dwelling at 3327 Hartly Road was completed, and by 1968, the house at 6433 Halltown Road had been built (Aerial Photographs 1954, 1961 and 1968). Outside of the Vincent farm, other landowners took advantage of increased land values in the region and also sold off portions of their property for residential development. The dwelling at 2333 Pearsons Corner Road had been constructed or moved to the site before Carlton I. Pippin sold one acre of his five-acre property to Peter and Charlotte Ann Goff in 1967 (Kent County Deed S24/83; aerial photograph 1968). The crossroads at Pearson's Corner also attracted commercial development in the Post World War Two era, most of which was geared towards satisfying the needs of automobile travelers. In the 1950s and 1960s two gas stations opened at the crossroads, in addition to the abovementioned station operating at the site of the former Pearson store. A house and luncheonette that had been built between 1937 and 1953 at the northeast corner of Pearson's Corner was converted to a store and gas station by 1959 (Kent County Deed Z21/305; Aerial Photograph 1937). And another gas station was built at 6549 Halltown Road between 1961 and 1968 (Aerial Photographs 1961, 1968).

== Notable families ==
=== The Rash Family ===
The Rash family was a prominent Delaware farming family that had settled near Pearson's Corner by the early 19th century. John Rash, the founder of the American branch of the Rash family had emigrated from Wales and settled near Camden, Delaware where his son Joseph Rash Sr. was born. Joseph Rash Sr. and his first wife owned and cultivated a farm near Camden where they raised five children: Joseph Jr., John, Hester, Elizabeth and Mary. However, after his first wife's death, Joseph Sr. sold the farm near Camden and bought 300 acres of the tract formerly called Wieberry near Pearson's Corner, making him the first of the Rash family to settle in the vicinity. Shortly thereafter, and prior to 1817, Joseph Rash Sr. married Elizabeth Hurd and the couple made their homestead on the 300 acres he had purchased near Pearson's Corner. He cleared and cultivated the land, erected buildings on the property and quickly became involved in the political and religious affairs of the community (J.M. Runk & Co. 1899:841).

=== The Pearson Family ===
William Pearson – the namesake of Pearson's Corner – was the first member of the Pearson family to settle near present-day Pearson's Corner. William Pearson and his wife Ann had at least seven children: William, Lydia, Rhody, Eliza, John, Martha and Abraham (United States Census Population Schedules 1850). In 1833, William Pearson purchased a large tract containing 437 acres and 25 square perches of land on the south side of the Horse Head Road, much of which would later become the property of his son Abraham (Kent County Deed G3/213). William Pearson established a farmstead on his property and a tax assessment recorded in 1837 noted that a brick dwelling, wooden dwelling, and outbuilding occupied by Pearson himself stood somewhere on the property (Kent County Board of Assessments 1837). A deed written in 1870 offers clues to the likely location of Pearson's early house. When William Pearson sold part of his farm tract to Abraham Pearson in that year the property was described as “lying on the South side of the Public road from Dover to Davis Corner, at or contiguous to Pearson’s Corner, the same being now in the tenure of the said Abraham Pearson and was lately the farm residence of the said William Pearson” (Kent County Deed M5/12). Beers’ Atlas of the State of Delaware (1868) shows Abraham Pearson's residence on the south side of the road to the east of Pearson's Corner, which is likely the dwelling referred to in the aforesaid deed.

=== The Thomas Family ===
By 1850, Jonathan Thomas had established a wheelwright shop on the five-acre property at the northwest corner of Pearson's Corner which his son had purchased in 1840 from John H. Rash (Kent County Deed Q3/2). He operated a wheelwright and blacksmith shop on the property until he died in 1864. Upon his death the Orphans Court of Kent County ordered that his lot at Pearson's Corner, which at the time contained a two-story frame dwelling, a blacksmith shop and wheelwright shop, stable and smoke house, be divided amongst his heirs – his wife Harriet, nine children and three grandchildren – and a survey of the property was drafted to this effect (Kent County Probate Files, Jonathan Thomas deceased, 1864–1866). Ultimately the property passed to Jonathan Thomas’ son, Joseph H. Thomas, who continued to operate the wheelwright shop at least until 1880 and likely until his death (see Kent County Probate Files, Joseph H. Thomas and United States Census Population Schedules 1870, 1880; Boyd 1874; Boyd 1879). Joseph H. Thomas and his wife Mary lived on the property in Pearson's Corner and in addition to serving as the village's wheelwright, Thomas was also the postmaster (Kent County Probate Files, Joseph H. Thomas; Boyd 1874; Boyd 1879). The house at the northwest corner of Pearson's Corner remained in the Thomas family until the heirs of Mary Thomas sold the property in 1925 (Kent County Deed X12/5).
