= Marydel, Delaware =

Unincorporated community in Delaware, United States

Marydel, Delaware Halltown
- Unincorporated community
- Location within the state of Delaware Marydel, Delaware (the United States)
- Coordinates: 39°6′44″N 75°44′40″W
- Country: United States
- State: Delaware
- County: Kent
- Time zone: UTC-5 (Eastern (EST))
  - Summer (DST): UTC-4 (EDT)
- ZIP code: 19964
- Area code: 302
- GNIS feature ID: 214279

Marydel (also called Halltown) is an unincorporated community in Kent County, Delaware, United States. It lies along Delaware Route 8 west of the city of Dover, the county seat of Kent County and Delaware's state capital. Because the community has borne multiple names, the Board on Geographic Names officially designated it "Marydel" in 1897. It has a post office with the ZIP code 19964. The post office is shared with Marydel, Maryland (ZIP code 21649) and is located in Maryland.

As part of the Mason–Dixon line, Marydel is home to Crownstone #45.

== See also ==
- Marydel, Maryland
