= Westover Hills, Delaware =

Unincorporated community in Delaware, United States

- Unincorporated community
- Location within Delaware Location within the United States
- Coordinates: 39°45′48″N 75°35′27″W
- Country: United States
- State: Delaware
- County: New Castle
- Elevation: 217 ft (66 m)
- Time zone: UTC-5 (Eastern (EST))
  - Summer (DST): UTC-4 (EDT)
- Area code: 302
- GNIS feature ID: 214828

Westover Hills is an unincorporated community in New Castle County, Delaware, United States. Westover Hills is located west of North Dupont Road between Delaware Route 48 and Delaware Route 52 west of Wilmington.
