= Delaware Route 100 =

State highway in New Castle County, Delaware, United States

Delaware Route 100

Route information
- Maintained by DelDOT
- Length: 8.99 mi (14.47 km)
- Existed: 1938–present
- Tourist routes: Brandywine Valley National Scenic Byway

Major junctions
- South end: DE 4 near Elsmere
- DE 2 in Elsmere; DE 48 near Wilmington; DE 141 near Wilmington; DE 52 in Greenville; DE 92 in Montchanin
- North end: SR 3100 at Pennsylvania border near Montchanin

Location
- Country: United States
- State: Delaware
- Counties: New Castle

Highway system
- Delaware State Route System; List; Byways
← I-95	→ US 113

Delaware Route 100 (DE 100) is a state highway in New Castle County, Delaware. The route runs from DE 4 near Elsmere to the Pennsylvania border near Montchanin, where the road continues into Pennsylvania as State Route 3100 (SR 3100, Chadds Ford Road). The road runs through suburban areas of northern New Castle County. The route intersects DE 2 in Elsmere before forming separate concurrencies with DE 48 and DE 141 from west of Wilmington north to Greenville. In Greenville, there is an interchange with DE 52. North of Greenville, DE 100 continues by itself to the Pennsylvania border, intersecting DE 92 in Montchanin. DE 100 was first designated in the 1930s to run from DE 52 to the Pennsylvania border, where it connected to Pennsylvania Route 100 (PA 100) until the southern terminus of that route was truncated away from the state line in 2003. By the 1970s, it was extended south to DE 4. The route was realigned to follow parts of DE 48 and DE 141 by 1990.

== Route description ==
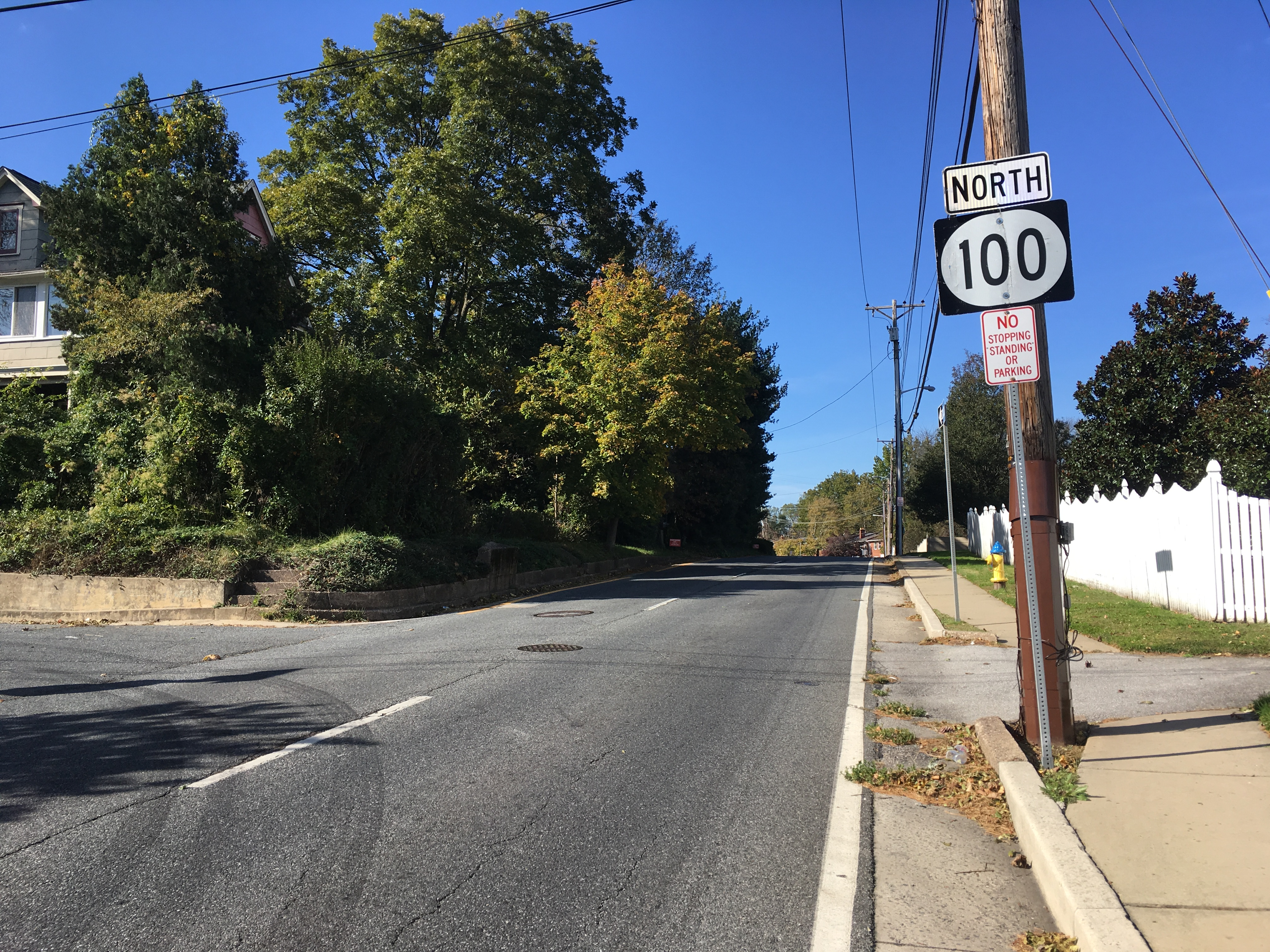
DE 100 north of DE 4 near Elsmere

DE 100 begins at an intersection with DE 4 southwest of the city of Wilmington, heading north on the one-way pair of Race Street northbound and South Dupont Road southbound. The one-way pair, which carries two lanes in each direction, passes through suburban residential areas. Both directions of the route join, with the route continuing northwest as South Dupont Road, a four-lane divided highway. DE 100 curves north and enters the town of Elsmere, where it runs through industrial areas and comes to a bridge over Little Mill Creek, B&O Lane, CSX's Philadelphia Subdivision railroad line, and Baltimore Avenue. A short distance later, the route crosses DE 2 and the name changes to North Dupont Road, where it becomes an undivided road and passes over an East Penn Railroad line on a bridge. The road continues through wooded residential areas, leaving Elsmere and becoming South Dupont Road. The route reaches an intersection with the eastern terminus of Faulkland Road. Following this intersection, DE 100 passes to the east of a cemetery before coming to a junction with DE 48 south of the Cab Calloway School of the Arts and Charter School of Wilmington.

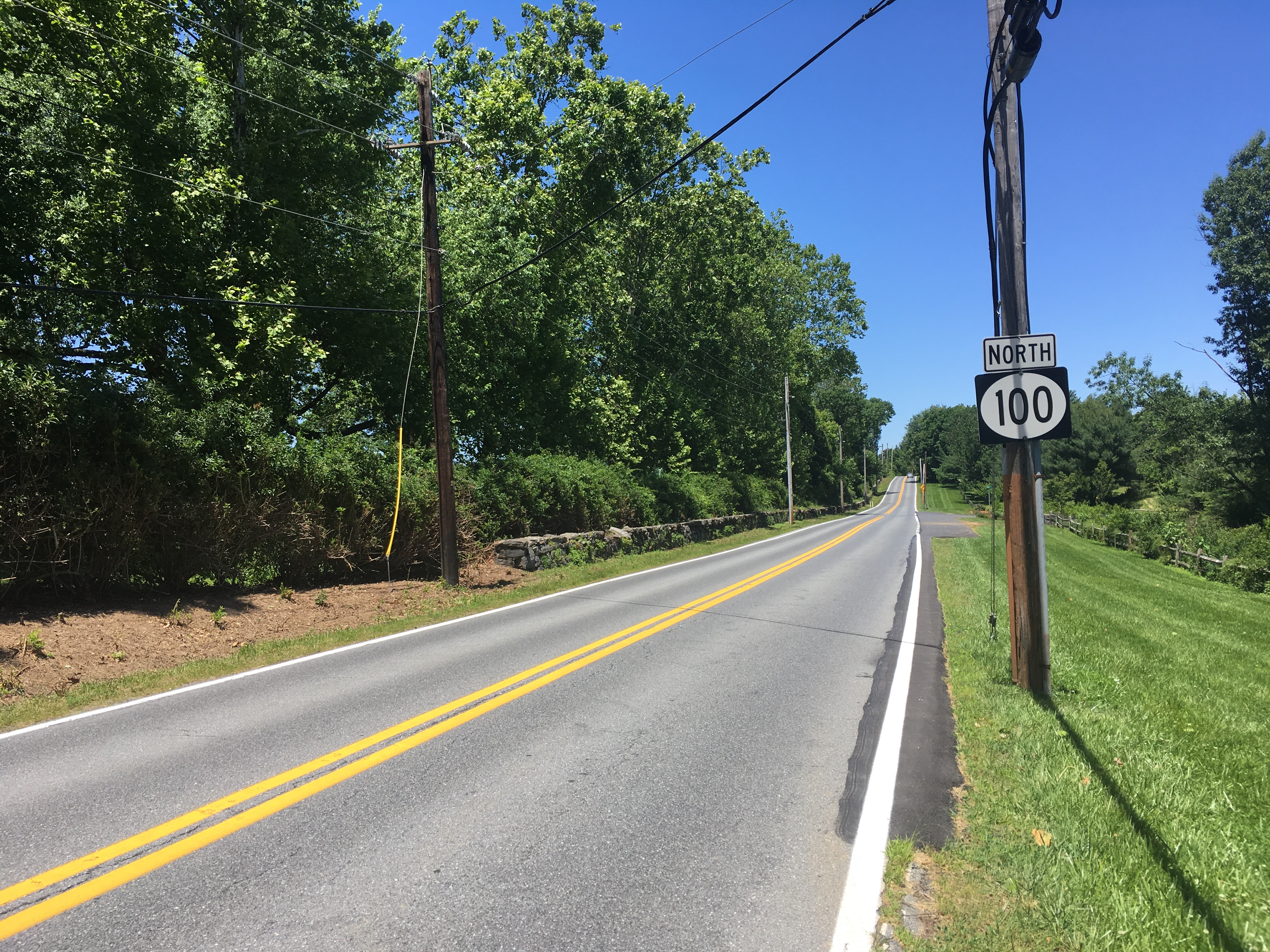
DE 100 northbound in Montchanin

At this point, DE 100 turns northwest to form a concurrency with DE 48 on four-lane undivided Lancaster Pike, passing through business areas before crossing the East Penn Railroad at-grade. The road continues through residential and commercial areas, crossing Chestnut Run and widening into a divided highway as it comes to an intersection with DE 141. Here, DE 100 splits from DE 48 by turning northeast to join DE 141 on four-lane divided Centre Road. The road runs to the west of commercial areas, curving north past the Barley Mill Road intersection. The roadway curves northeast and passes under the East Penn Railroad before coming to a partial cloverleaf interchange with DE 52 in Greenville. This interchange has no access from DE 100/DE 141 southbound to DE 52 southbound or from DE 52 to DE 100/DE 141 northbound. Past this interchange, the road curves east, with DE 100 splitting from DE 141 at an at-grade intersection by heading north on two-lane undivided Montchanin Road. Montchanin Road heads south from this intersection to provide access to DE 52.

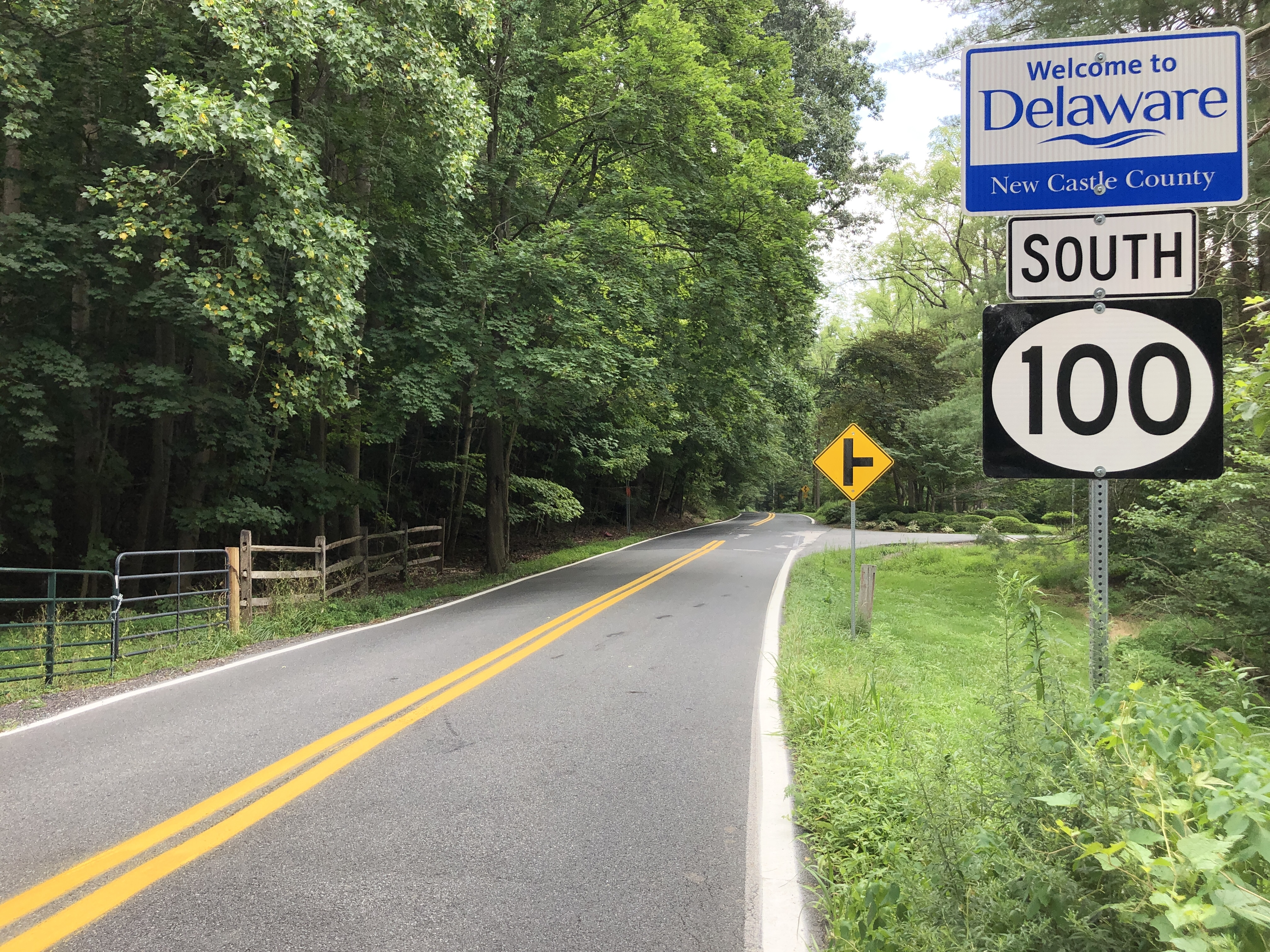
Beginning of DE 100 southbound at the Pennsylvania border near Montchanin

DE 100 continues north through wooded areas with fields and homes, crossing the East Penn Railroad line again at-grade. The road runs through Montchanin and passes to the east of the Wilmington Country Club before crossing the railroad tracks again at-grade and coming to an employee entrance to the Winterthur Museum and Country Estate to the west. The route intersects the western terminus of DE 92 and Adams Dam Road on the western edge of Brandywine Creek State Park. At this point, DE 92 continues straight to the northeast and DE 100 turns north to remain on Montchanin Road, heading across Wilson Run. The road crosses under the East Penn Railroad again and curves northwest, coming to an intersection with Center Meeting Road/Smith Bridge Road. DE 100 bends to the north again before reaching its northern terminus at the Pennsylvania border, where the road continues into that state as SR 3100 (Chadds Ford Road), an unsigned quadrant route. The Montchanin Road portion of DE 100 is part of the Brandywine Valley National Scenic Byway, a National Scenic Byway and Delaware Byway.

DE 100 has an annual average daily traffic count ranging from a high of 43,842 vehicles at the DE 52 interchange along the DE 141 concurrency to a low of 2,126 vehicles at the Pennsylvania border. The portions of DE 100 concurrent with DE 48 and DE 141 are part of the National Highway System.

== History ==
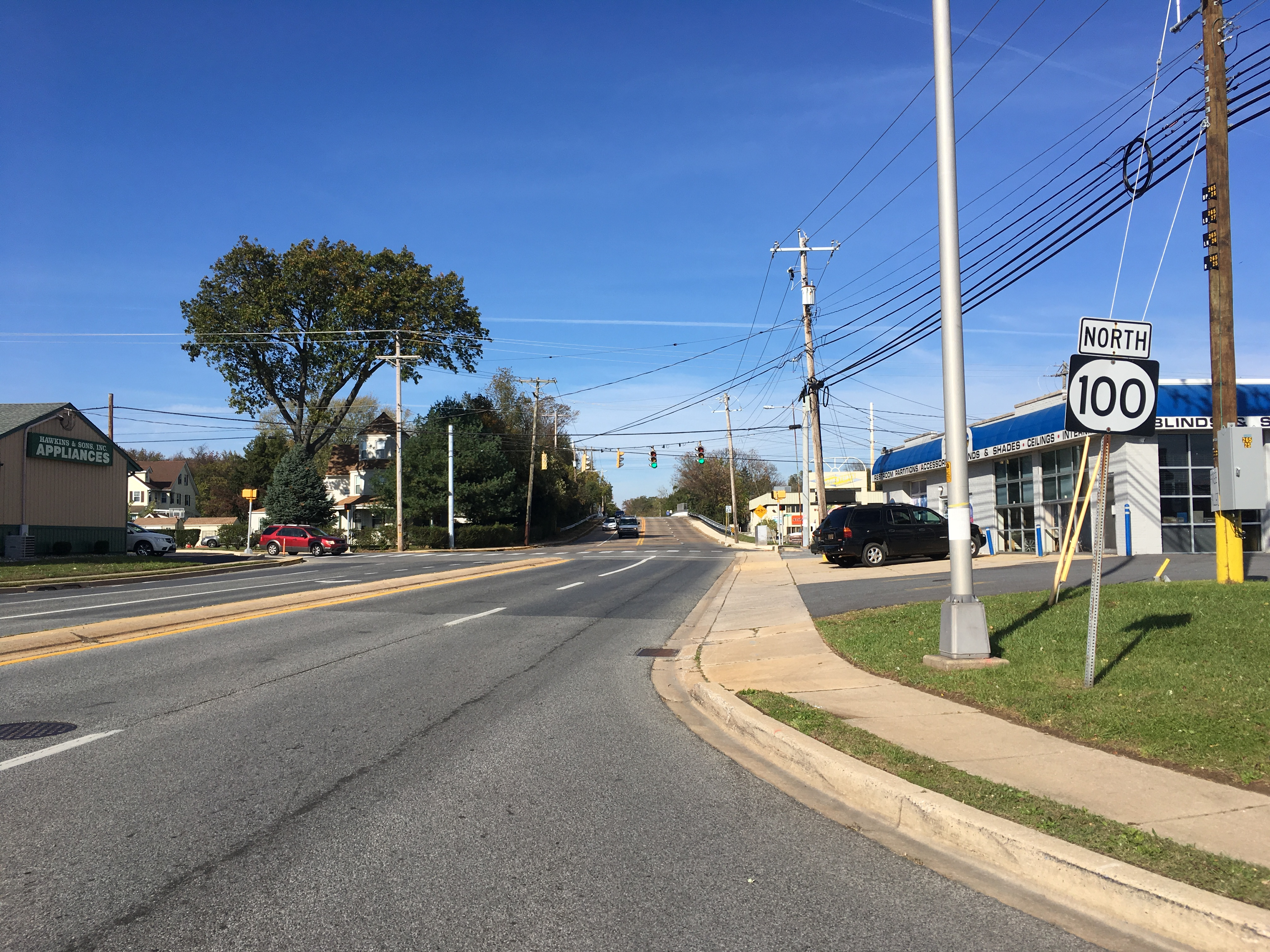
DE 100 northbound past DE 2 in Elsmere

The Dupont Road portion of the route was built in the 19th century by the DuPont Company to transport black powder south to the Christina River to be shipped. The road was built as a result of the city of Wilmington restricting gunpowder being transported in the city due to a three-wagon explosion on May 31, 1854 that killed 5 people and 15 horses along with causing damage to nearby buildings. By 1920, what is now DE 100 existed as a county road. The route north of Kennett Pike was proposed as a state highway by 1924. The highway was paved by 1931. By 1932, the state highway had been completed from Elsmere north to the Kennett Pike intersection while the remainder was still a county route. DE 100 was designated by 1938 to run from DE 52 in Greenville north to the Pennsylvania border, where the road continued as PA 100. The route was extended south to DE 4 by 1971, following Dupont Road. DE 100 was realigned to bypass a portion of Dupont Road by following DE 48 and DE 141 by 1990. In 2002, the Montchanin Road portion of DE 100 was designated as part of the Brandywine Valley Scenic Highway in the Delaware Scenic and Historic Highways system; it was designated a National Scenic Byway in 2005. In 2003, the southern terminus of PA 100 was moved from the Delaware border to U.S. Route 202 north of West Chester. However, DE 100 remains unchanged. On February 24, 2015, the bridge carrying DE 100 over the East Penn Railroad in Elsmere was closed after concrete fell from the bridge deck onto the railroad tracks below. Emergency repairs took place and the bridge was expected to be reopened by the end of March.

== Major intersections ==
The entire route is in New Castle County.

Location	mi	km	Destinations	Notes
Elsmere	0.00	0.00	DE 4 (Maryland Avenue)	Southern terminus
Elsmere	0.73	1.17	DE 2 (Kirkwood Highway) – Wilmington	
Wilmington	1.64	2.64	DE 48 east (Lancaster Avenue)	South end of DE 48 overlap
Wilmington	2.67	4.30	DE 48 west (Lancaster Pike) – Hockessin, Lancaster DE 141 south (Centre Road) – Newport	North end of DE 48 overlap; south end of DE 141 overlap
Greenville	3.86	6.21	DE 52 – Greenville, Wilmington	Interchange; no access from southbound DE 100/DE 141 to southbound DE 52 or from DE 52 to northbound DE 100/DE 141
Greenville	4.14	6.66	DE 141 north (Barley Mill Road) Montchanin Road to DE 52	North end of DE 141 overlap
Montchanin	6.28	10.11	DE 92 east (Thompson Bridge Road)	Western terminus of DE 92
Montchanin	8.99	14.47	SR 3100 north (Chadds Ford Road)	Pennsylvania state line; northern terminus, formerly a segment of PA 100
1.000 mi = 1.609 km; 1.000 km = 0.621 mi: Concurrency terminus; Incomplete access
