= DE34 =

DE34 may refer to:

- Delaware Route 34
- ROCS Wen Shan (DE-34)
- USS Eisele (DE-34)
