= U.S. Route 13 Business (Wilmington, Delaware) =

Business route in Wilmington, Delaware

U.S. Route 13 Business
- US 13 Bus. northbound highlighted in red and southbound highlighted in yellow

Route information
- Auxiliary route of US 13
- Maintained by DelDOT
- Length: 8.19 mi (13.18 km)
- Existed: 1970–present
- Tourist routes: Harriet Tubman Underground Railroad Byway; Washington–Rochambeau Revolutionary Route

Major junctions
- South end: I-495 / US 13 in Minquadale
- DE 48 in Wilmington; DE 9 in Wilmington; DE 52 in Wilmington; DE 202 in Wilmington; DE 3 near Bellefonte
- North end: US 13 in Claymont

Location
- Country: United States
- State: Delaware
- Counties: New Castle

Highway system
- United States Numbered Highway System; List; Special; Divided; Delaware State Route System; List; Byways

U.S. Route 13 Business (US 13 Bus.) is an 8.19-mile (13.18 km) business route of US 13 that runs through the heart of the city of Wilmington in New Castle County, Delaware, where US 13 bypasses downtown Wilmington to the east, running near Interstate 495 (I-495) and the Delaware River. US 13 Bus. begins at I-495 and US 13 at the southern border of Wilmington and heads north toward the downtown area, where it splits into a one-way pair. Past downtown, the business route heads through the northeastern part of the city on North Market Street before continuing through suburban Brandywine Hundred on Philadelphia Pike. US 13 Bus. reaches its northern terminus at US 13 in Claymont. US 13 Bus. is a four-lane road for much of its length.

The Philadelphia Pike was built as a turnpike in the 1820s and improved to a state highway by 1920. US 13 was designated to run through downtown Wilmington and along Philadelphia Pike in 1926. During the 1930s, US 13 was shifted from Market Street to a one-way pair on Market and French streets before both directions were moved onto French Street through downtown Wilmington. In the 1950s, the route was shifted to Walnut and French streets in the downtown area. The Walnut Street extension south of downtown, which included a new bridge over the Christina River, opened in 1957. US 13 Bus. was designated in 1970 when US 13 was routed to bypass Wilmington along the former US 13 Alternate (US 13 Alt.) The business route was moved to its current one-way pairing on Walnut and King street in the 1970s.

== Route description ==
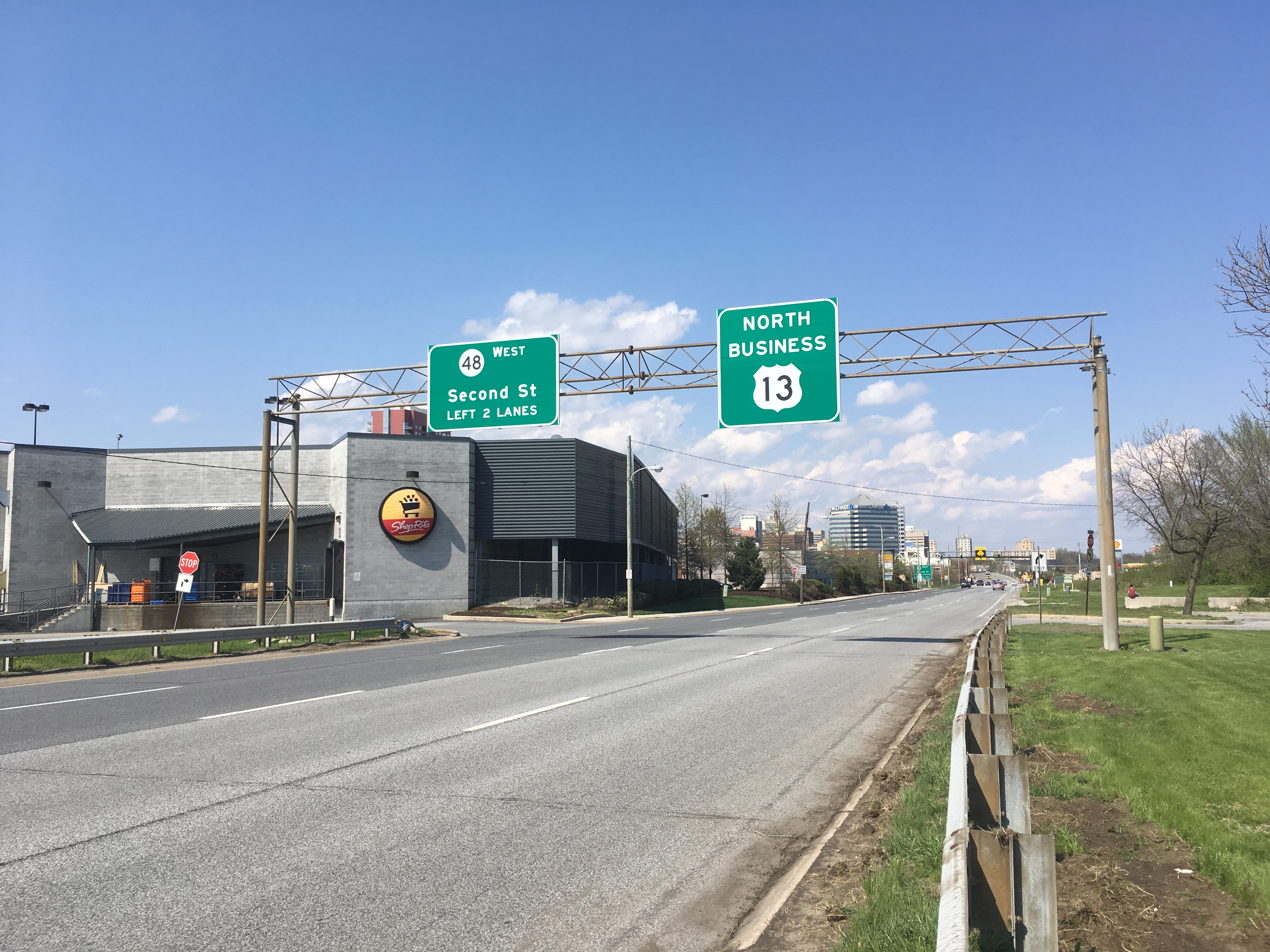
US 13 Bus. northbound on South Walnut Street approaching downtown Wilmington

US 13 Bus. branches off of US 13 at the southern edge of the city of Wilmington, just north of I-495. From here, the business route heads north on four-lane divided South Walnut Street. Immediately after beginning, the route has a southbound ramp to southbound I-495 and intersects Rogers Road. US 13 Bus. heads through commercial areas, becoming undivided as it comes to a bridge over Norfolk Southern Railway's Shellpot Secondary railroad line. The route splits into a one-way pair, with the northbound direction following South Walnut Street and the southbound direction following South Market Street, with three northbound lanes and four southbound lanes. The route heads west of Chase Fieldhouse, which is home to the Delaware Blue Coats of the NBA G League. The road passes businesses, a few homes, and the Christina Landing condominium complex (which includes the River Tower at Christina Landing, the tallest residential building in Delaware) before the business route crosses the Christina River on the Walnut Street Bridge northbound and the South Market Street Bridge southbound, both of which are drawbridges.

US 13 Bus. heads into downtown Wilmington and crosses under Amtrak's Northeast Corridor railroad line at Wilmington station that serves Amtrak and SEPTA's Wilmington/Newark Line. Immediately after, the business route intersects the eastern terminus of Delaware Route 48 (DE 48), which follows Martin Luther King Jr. Boulevard/Front Street eastbound and 2nd Street westbound, while the northbound direction passes west of the Wilmington Transit Center serving DART First State busses. At this point, US 13 Bus. continues north to follow North Walnut Street northbound and North King Street southbound, with four northbound lanes and three southbound lanes. The road passes downtown businesses and intersects DE 9 (4th Street) south of the Leonard L. Williams Justice Center (the county courthouse for New Castle County). Continuing through the downtown, the business route carries three lanes in each direction and runs near high-rise buildings, with southbound US 13 Bus. passing to the east of Delaware College of Art and Design north of 6th Street. Further north, the southbound direction passes east of Rodney Square between 10th and 11th streets before the route comes to a junction with the southern terminus of DE 52, which follows 11th Street eastbound (southbound) and 12th Street westbound (northbound). At the north end of downtown, northbound US 13 Bus. turns west on 16th Street to rejoin the southbound direction.

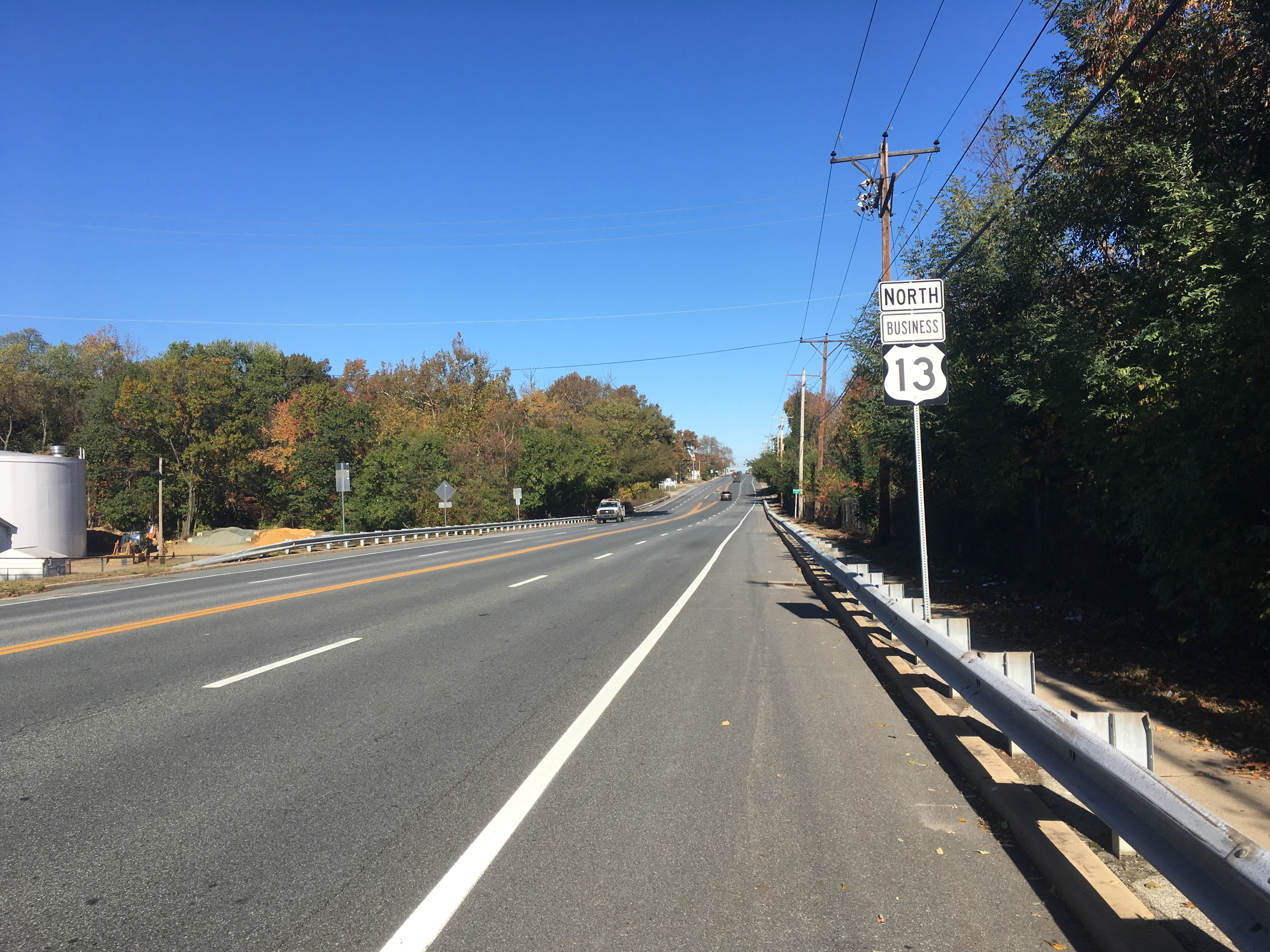
US 13 Bus. northbound on Philadelphia Pike northeast of Wilmington

From here, US 13 Bus. heads north on four-lane undivided North Market Street and crosses Brandywine Creek. After the bridge, the road curves northeast and becomes a three-lane road with one northbound lane and two southbound lanes, passing urban residential and commercial development as it comes to an intersection with the southern terminus of DE 202 (Concord Avenue). The route becomes a two-lane road and passes more urban areas along with a couple cemeteries.

US 13 Bus. widens to four lanes again as it heads out of Wilmington and into suburban Brandywine Hundred, with the name of the road changing to Philadelphia Pike. Here, the business route crosses Shellpot Creek and intersects DE 3 and Shipley Road, forming a concurrency with DE 3. The two routes pass suburban homes and businesses, crossing Marsh Road before DE 3 splits from US 13 Bus. by heading to the northwest. US 13 Bus. runs along the northwestern edge of the town of Bellefonte before it passes to the southeast of Bellevue State Park. The business route crosses Stoney Creek as it continues northeast through residential neighborhoods with scattered businesses, heading through Holly Oak and intersecting Silverside Road before it crosses Perkins Run and reaches Claymont. At Harvey Road, the road narrows to two travel lanes and a center turn lane until the business route intersects US 13 and reaches its northern terminus, with Philadelphia Pike continuing northeast as part of US 13.

The portion of the route between A Street and DE 9 (4th Street) in Wilmington is part of the Harriet Tubman Underground Railroad Byway, a Delaware Byway. The section of US 13 Bus. between DE 9 in Wilmington and US 13 in Claymont is part of the Washington–Rochambeau Revolutionary Route, a National Historic Trail. US 13 Bus. has an annual average daily traffic count ranging from a high of 31,480 vehicles at DE 48 in Wilmington to a low of 7,684 vehicles at the DE 3 intersection near Bellefonte. US 13 Bus. is a part of the National Highway System between the southern terminus and DE 202 in Wilmington.

== History ==
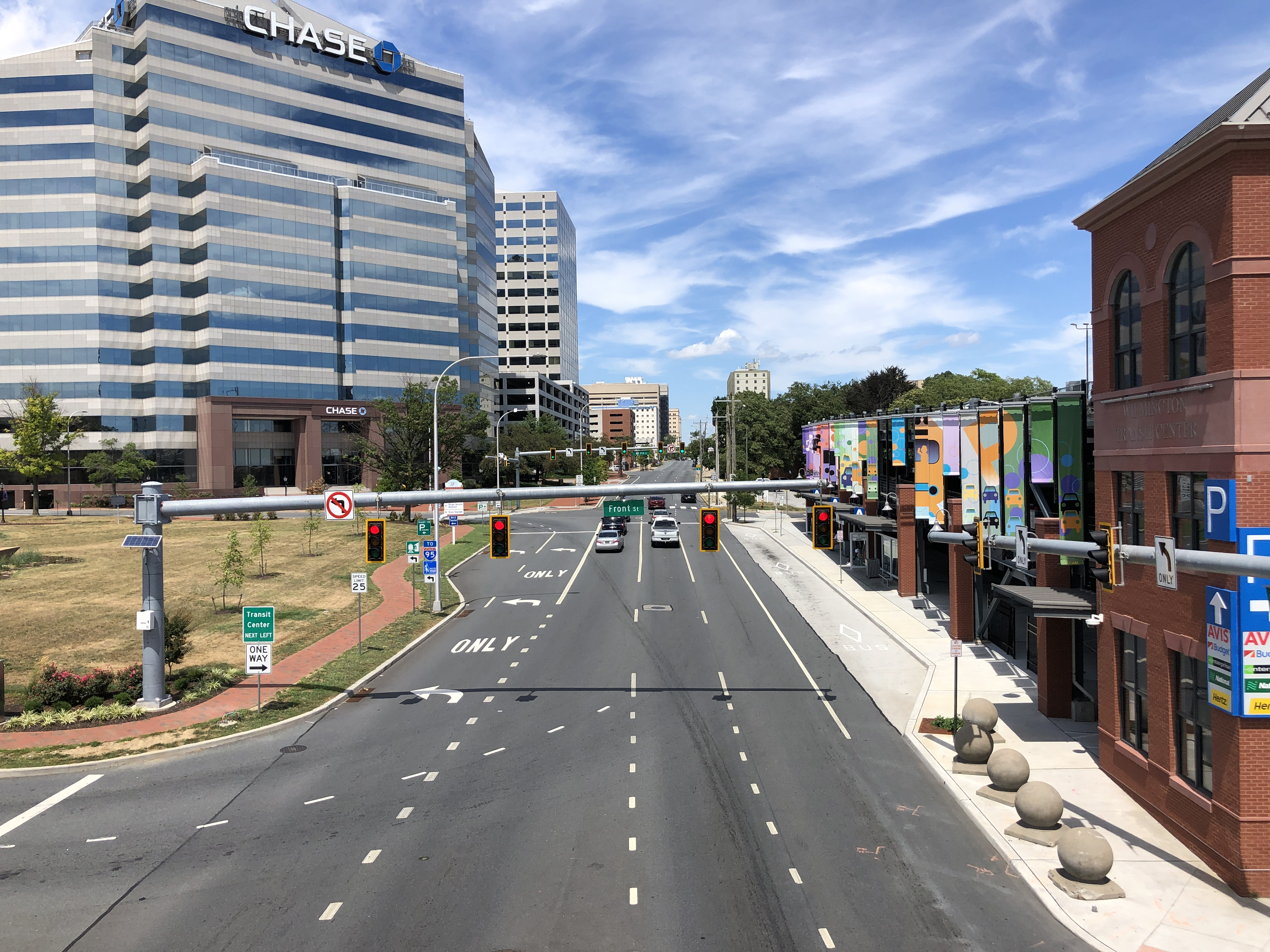
US 13 Bus. northbound at DE 48 in downtown Wilmington

In 1813, the Wilmington and Philadelphia Turnpike Company was chartered to build a turnpike running from the Brandywine Bridge in Wilmington northeast to the Pennsylvania border, where the roadway would continue to Philadelphia. A 3.75-mile (6.04 km) long portion of the road near Wilmington was finished in 1816 with the remainder completed in 1823. With the Federal Aid Road Act of 1916, the Philadelphia Pike was to be improved by the state. The Philadelphia Pike was upgraded to a state highway by 1920. The Philadelphia Pike was designated part of a branch of the Lincoln Highway and part of the Capitol Trail in the 1910s, which continued west of Wilmington to Newark and the Maryland border along the present-day DE 2 corridor, then south to Washington, D.C., and Atlanta.

In 1925, recommendations were made to improve the South Market Street Causeway over the Christina River in Wilmington, which included a new bridge over the river. Construction on the drawbridge began in May 1926. In 1927, the new drawbridge, the four-lane South Market Street Bridge, opened over the Christina River on South Market Street in Wilmington, replacing a previous drawbridge that was only two lanes wide.

With the creation of the U.S. Numbered Highway System in 1926, US 13 was routed to head through Wilmington along Market Street and to the northeast of Wilmington along Philadelphia Pike. In 1926, the Delaware State Highway Department suggested the Philadelphia Pike be widened. US 13 was widened along the Philadelphia Pike between Shellpot Park and Bellevue Quarry in 1927. In 1928, the widening of Philadelphia Pike was completed.

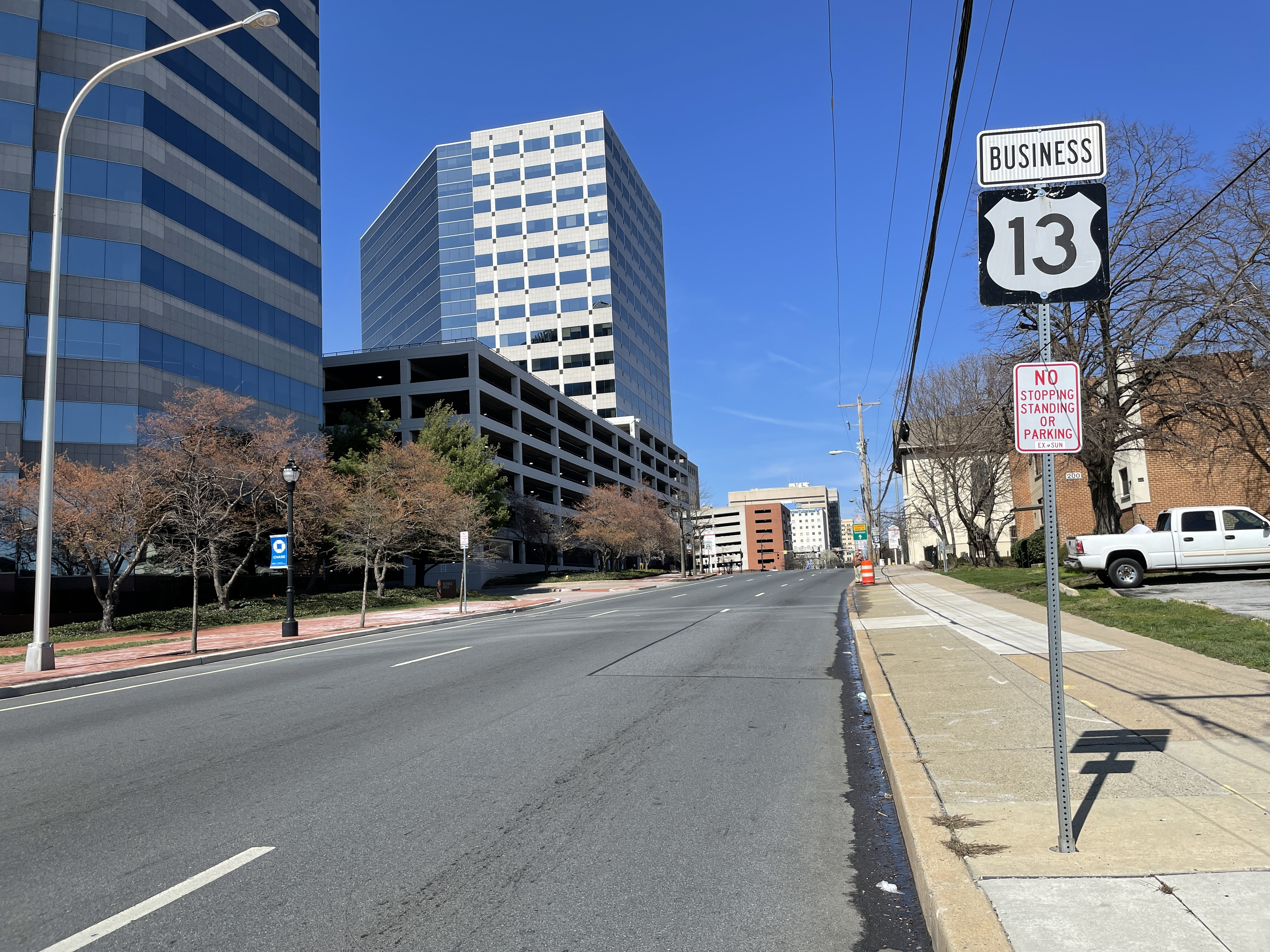
US 13 Bus. northbound past DE 48 in downtown Wilmington

By 1932, US 13 was split into the one-way pair of French Street northbound and Market Street southbound in the downtown area. Both directions of the route was shifted to use French Street by 1936. On July 18, 1938, the grade crossing with the Reading Railroad (now abandoned) and the Pennsylvania Railroad (now Norfolk Southern Railway's Shellpot Secondary) on South Market Street in Wilmington was eliminated with the opening of a bridge over the railroad tracks.

In 1952, a new bridge over the Christina River, the Walnut Street Bridge, was proposed to link Walnut Street in the downtown area with the Dupont Parkway section of US 13 south of the city. Under this plan, the Walnut Street Bridge would be used for northbound traffic while the South Market Street Bridge would be used for southbound traffic. By this time, US 13 was routed on a one-way pair in the downtown area, using Walnut Street northbound and French Street southbound. A year later, the Walnut Street Bridge project was under contract. Construction on the project began in 1955. Construction of the Walnut Street Extension, which included the drawbridge, approach roads, and a new bridge under the Pennsylvania Railroad (now Amtrak's Northeast Corridor), was completed in 1957. As a result, US 13 was split into the one-way pair of South Walnut Street northbound and South Market Street southbound between the south end of the city and downtown.

Plans were made to widen the Philadelphia Pike to a four-lane road between Bellevue Road and Claymont in 1954. The widening project was completed in 1956. US 13 Bus. was established in 1970, replacing the former alignment of US 13 through Wilmington that was shifted to bypass the city along the former US 13 Alt. By 1976, southbound US 13 Bus. was shifted to use King Street instead of French Street through downtown Wilmington.

== Major intersections ==
The entire route is in New Castle County.

Location	mi	km	Destinations	Notes
Minquadale	0.00	0.00	US 13 (North Dupont Highway/South Heald Street) to I-295 / I-495 north – Delaware Memorial Bridge, Dover, Port of Wilmington, Philadelphia	Southern terminus
Minquadale			I-495 south – Newport, Baltimore	Ramp from US 13 Bus. southbound to I-495 southbound; I-495 exit 1
Wilmington	1.37	2.20	DE 48 east (Martin Luther King Jr. Boulevard/Front Street)	Eastern terminus of DE 48
Wilmington	1.42	2.29	DE 48 west (2nd Street) to I-95 – Riverfront, Transit Center	Eastern terminus of DE 48
Wilmington	1.55	2.49	DE 9 (4th Street)	
Wilmington			DE 52 south (11th Street)	Southern terminus of DE 52
Wilmington			DE 52 north (12th Street)	Southern terminus of DE 52
Wilmington	2.67	4.30	DE 202 north (Concord Avenue)	Southern terminus of DE 202
Bellefonte	4.34	6.98	DE 3 south (Edgemoor Road)	South end of DE 3 overlap
Bellefonte	5.01	8.06	DE 3 north (Washington Street Extension)	North end of DE 3 overlap
Claymont	8.19	13.18	US 13 (Governor Printz Boulevard/Philadelphia Pike)	Northern terminus
1.000 mi = 1.609 km; 1.000 km = 0.621 mi: Concurrency terminus; Incomplete access
