= South Market Street Bridge =

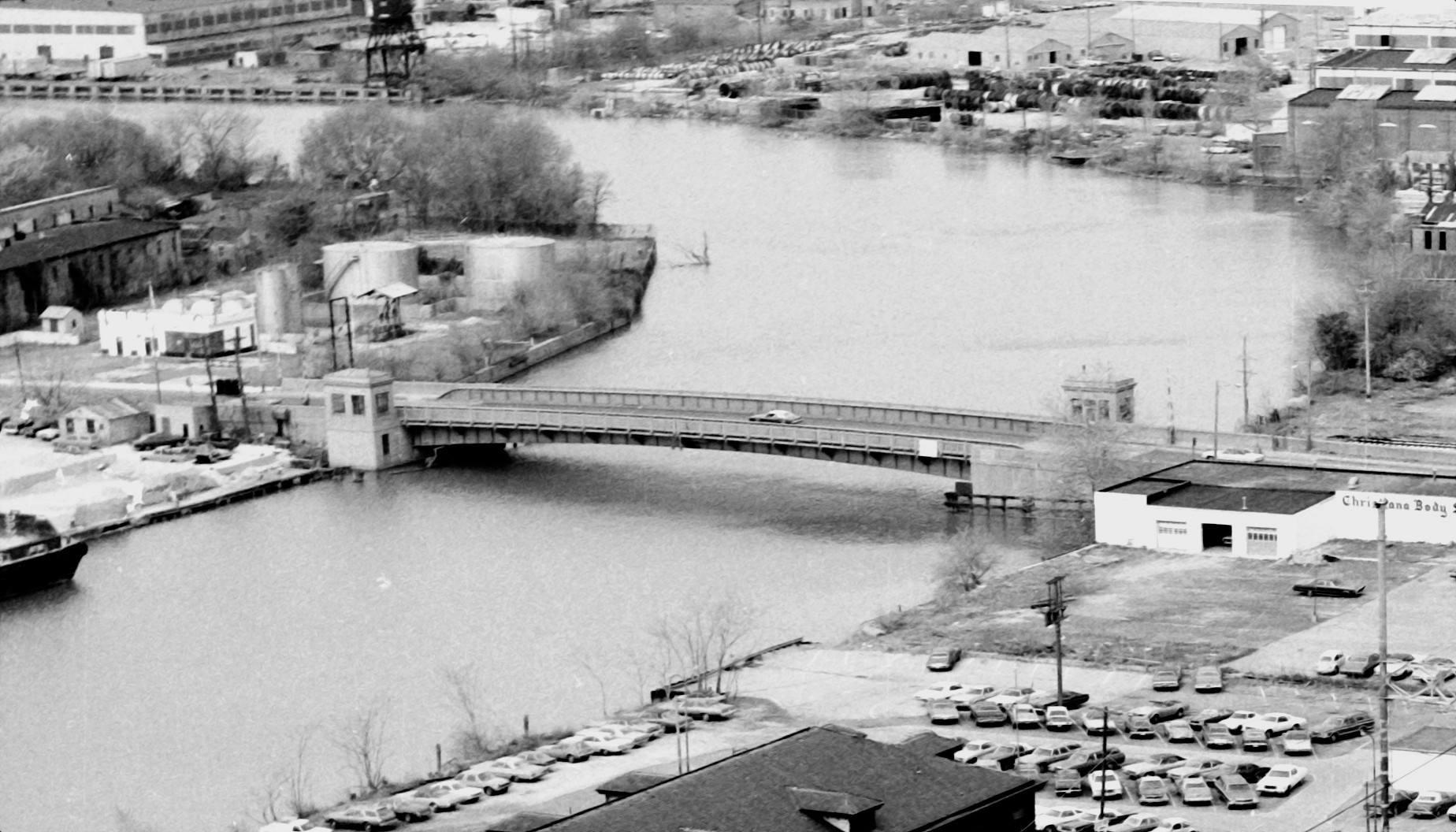
- The South Market Street Bridge 1977
- Coordinates: 39°44′11″N 75°33′15″W
- Carries: 3 lanes of US 13 Bus. south
- Crosses: Christina River
- Locale: Wilmington, Delaware
- Official name: Senator John E. Reilly, Sr. Bridge
- Maintained by: DelDOT

Characteristics
- Design: Double-leaf "trunnion style" bascule
- Longest span: 208 feet

History
- Opened: 1927 (replaced 1883 bridge)

The South Market Street Bridge, officially the Senator John E. Reilly, Sr. Bridge, is a bascule bridge that spans the Christina River in Wilmington, Delaware.

The current bridge, opened in 1927, is the latest of many bridges that have spanned the Christina at this location since 1808 when the first wooden turn bridge was constructed. Its construction was administered by the then State Highway Department (predecessor of the Delaware Department of Transportation), and was built to replace the swing bridge that was built in 1883 to replace the wooden turn bridge built in 1808. The span is one of only three pre-1957 drawbridges of its type in Delaware.

In 1982, the bridge was named after Wilmington state Senator John Edward Reilly Sr., a gravel-voiced cigar smoker known for his warmth and wit, who died of cancer on February 26, 1963.

The bridge underwent a major rehabilitation in 2004–2006 to replace and upgrade the existing machinery and improve lighting, pedestrian walkways, and the operator towers.
