= Delaware Route 52 =

State highway in New Castle County, Delaware, United States

Delaware Route 52

Route information
- Maintained by DelDOT
- Length: 7.87 mi (12.67 km)
- Existed: 1936–present
- Tourist routes: Brandywine Valley National Scenic Byway; Harriet Tubman Underground Railroad Byway

Major junctions
- South end: US 13 Bus. in Wilmington
- I-95 / US 202 in Wilmington; DE 2 in Wilmington; DE 100 / DE 141 in Greenville; DE 82 near Greenville
- North end: PA 52 near Centerville

Location
- Country: United States
- State: Delaware
- Counties: New Castle

Highway system
- Delaware State Route System; List; Byways
← DE 48	→ DE 54

Delaware Route 52 (DE 52) is a state highway in New Castle County, Delaware. The route runs from U.S. Route 13 Business (US 13 Bus.) in downtown Wilmington north to Pennsylvania Route 52 (PA 52) at the Pennsylvania border near Centerville. DE 52 runs through the city of Wilmington and passes through areas of the Brandywine Valley north of Wilmington. DE 52 intersects Interstate 95 (I-95)/US 202 and DE 2 in Wilmington and DE 100/DE 141 and DE 82 in Greenville. The entire route is designated as part of the Brandywine Valley National Scenic Byway, a National Scenic Byway and Delaware Byway, while most of the route is also designated as part of the Harriet Tubman Underground Railroad Byway of the Delaware Byways system. The road was built as the Kennett Pike, a turnpike, between 1811 and 1813. The Kennett Pike was bought by Pierre S. du Pont in 1919 and was widened and paved before being sold to the State of Delaware for $1. The road received the DE 52 designation by 1936.

== Route description ==
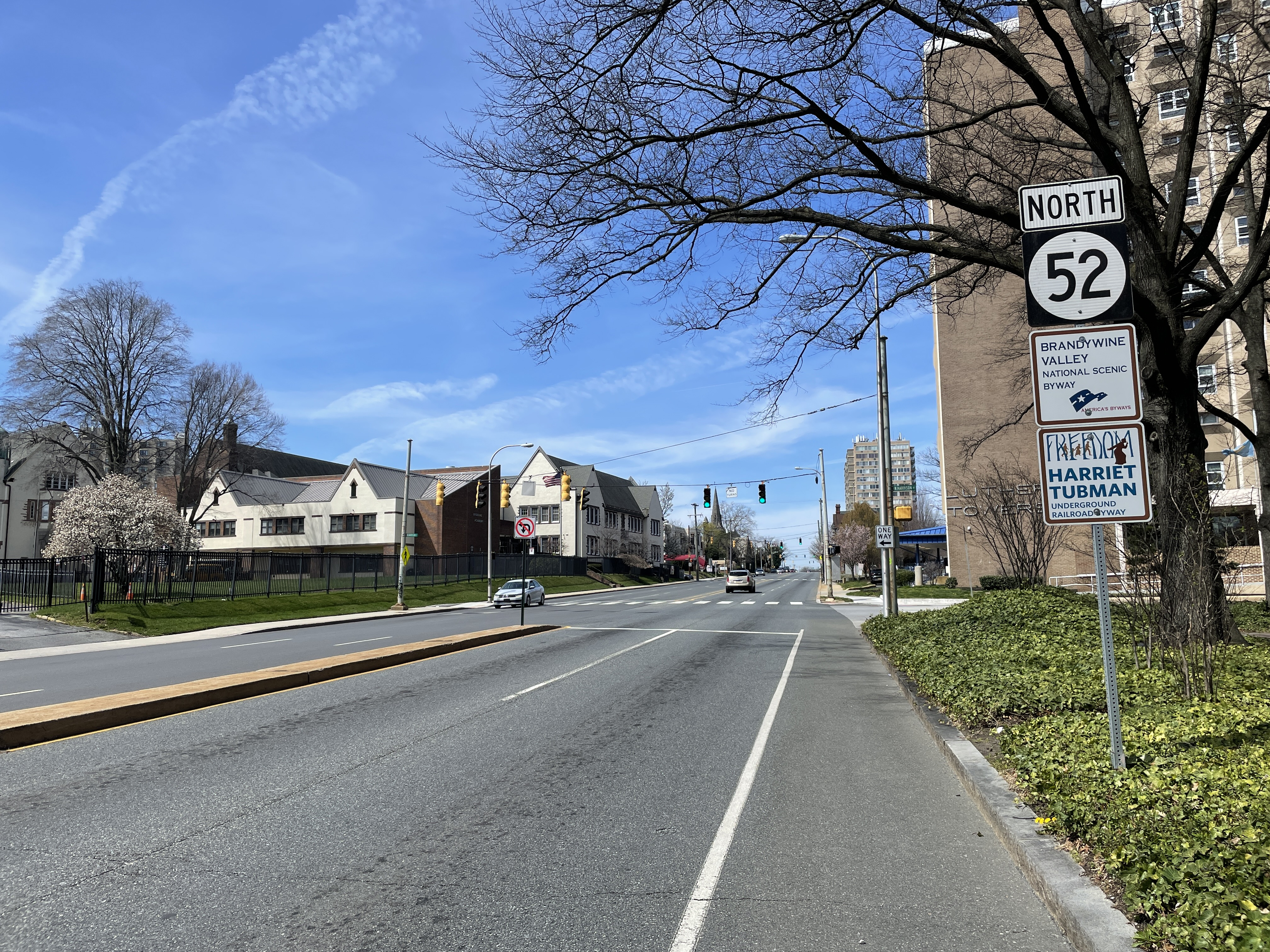
DE 52 northbound at Harrison Street in Wilmington

DE 52 begins at US 13 Bus., which is routed on the one-way pair of North Walnut Street northbound and North King Street southbound, in the downtown area of the city of Wilmington. From here, DE 52 follows the one-way pair of East 11th Street southbound and East 12th Street northbound to the northwest, forming the northern boundary of Rodney Square along East 11th Street between North King and North Market streets. The route becomes West 11th Street southbound and West 12th Street northbound at the North Market Street intersection. The one-way pair carries three lanes in each direction and heads northwest past downtown high-rise buildings, passing to the north of the DuPont Building along West 11th Street between North Market and North Orange streets and passing to the south of 1201 North Market Street along West 12th Street just west of North Market Street. The northbound direction passes south of Wilmington Hospital between North Washington and North Jefferson streets. Both directions of DE 52 merge onto Delaware Avenue, an eight-lane divided highway, and the route reaches an interchange with I-95/US 202. Past this interchange, the route narrows to six lanes and leaves downtown Wilmington. DE 52 splits from Delaware Avenue by continuing northwest on Pennsylvania Avenue, a four-lane undivided road that heads to the north of the Ursuline Academy and passes through urban areas of homes and businesses. The road intersects the eastern terminus of DE 2 in a commercial area on the northern edge of the Little Italy neighborhood and passes under CSX's Philadelphia Subdivision railroad line. The route runs through more residential areas north of the Wawaset Park neighborhood, passing to the northeast of the Wilmington Campus of the University of Delaware.

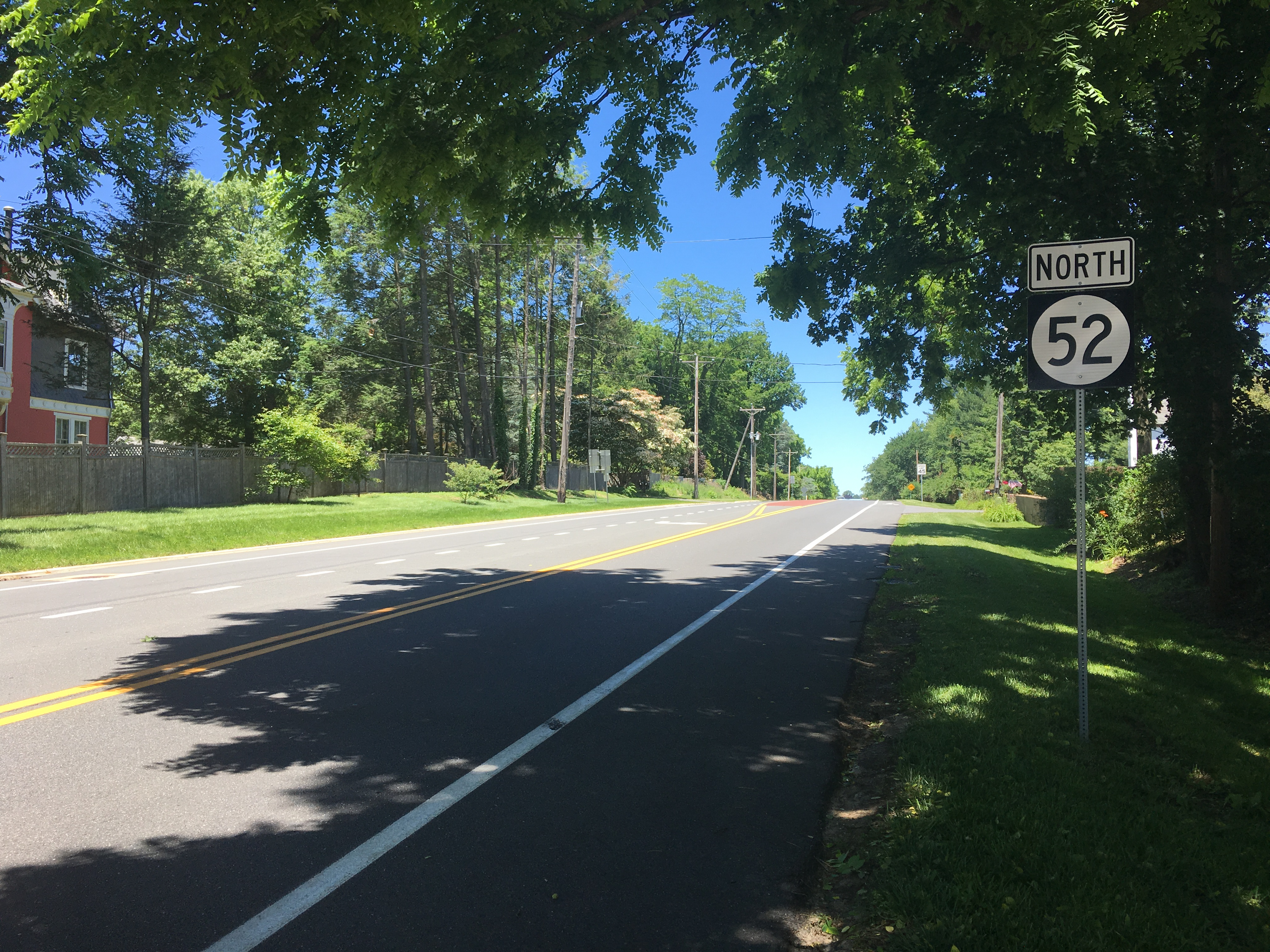
DE 52 northbound past DE 82 north of Greenville

DE 52 leaves Wilmington and becomes Kennett Pike, heading through wooded areas of suburban homes. The road passes north of a park and ride lot at the North Dupont Road intersection before it comes to a junction with Montchanin Road, which heads north to provide access to DE 100/DE 141. The road continues into Greenville and widens into a divided highway as it comes to a partial cloverleaf interchange with DE 100/DE 141. This interchange has no access from DE 100/DE 141 southbound to DE 52 southbound or from DE 52 to DE 100/DE 141 northbound. Past this interchange, the route continues into business areas, crossing an East Penn Railroad line at-grade before passing to the east of Alexis I. duPont High School. DE 52 leaves Greenville and narrows to a two-lane undivided road as it heads into wooded areas then open fields, intersecting the southern terminus of DE 82. The road continues through more forested suburban areas, passing to the west of the Wilmington Country Club and to the east of the Delaware Museum of Nature & Science. A park and ride lot located at a church is situated west of the roadway north of the Old Kennett Road intersection. The route passes to the west of the Winterthur Museum and Country Estate and heads into the community of Centerville. DE 52 heads northwest to its northern terminus at the Pennsylvania border, where the road continues into that state as PA 52 to Longwood Gardens and the borough of West Chester.

The entire length of DE 52 is part of the Brandywine Valley National Scenic Byway, a National Scenic Byway and Delaware Byway. The route between Washington and West streets in Wilmington and the Pennsylvania border is also part of the Harriet Tubman Underground Railroad Byway of the Delaware Byways system. DE 52 has an annual average daily traffic count ranging from a high of 28,106 vehicles at the Jefferson Street intersection in Wilmington to a low of 7,122 vehicles at the southern terminus at US 13 Bus. All of DE 52 is part of the National Highway System.

== History ==
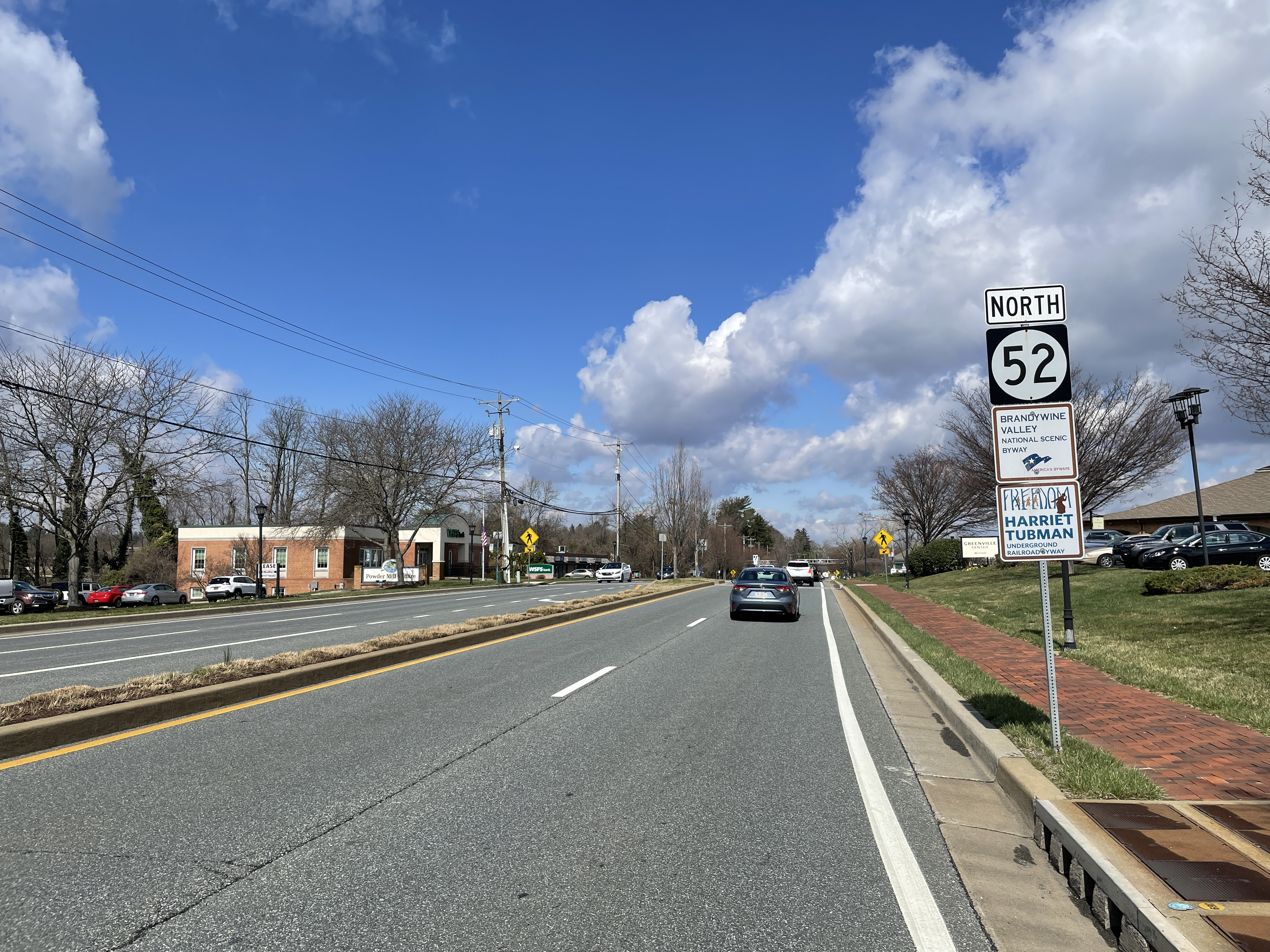
DE 52 northbound in Greenville

On January 21, 1811, the Wilmington and Kennett Turnpike Company was incorporated by the Delaware State Legislature to build a turnpike from Wilmington to the Pennsylvania border at Centerville. The turnpike was intended to provide a connection between Wilmington, which was a growing industrial city, and nearby areas in southeastern Pennsylvania, where it would connect to other turnpikes leading to western Pennsylvania. The road was built between 1811 and 1813 at a cost of $30,000. The Kennett Pike was built with a 100-foot (30 m) wide right-of-way, with a 20-foot (6.1 m) travel surface. The charter of the turnpike gave Christiana Hundred the option to purchase the road in 1820 and remove the tolls. The Kennett Pike had two toll gates north of Wilmington. Tolls along the turnpike were charged based on the type of carriage or vehicle and the amount and type of cargo being carried. People who used the roadway to travel between different parts of their property, along with people traveling to a house of worship or funeral, were not charged tolls.

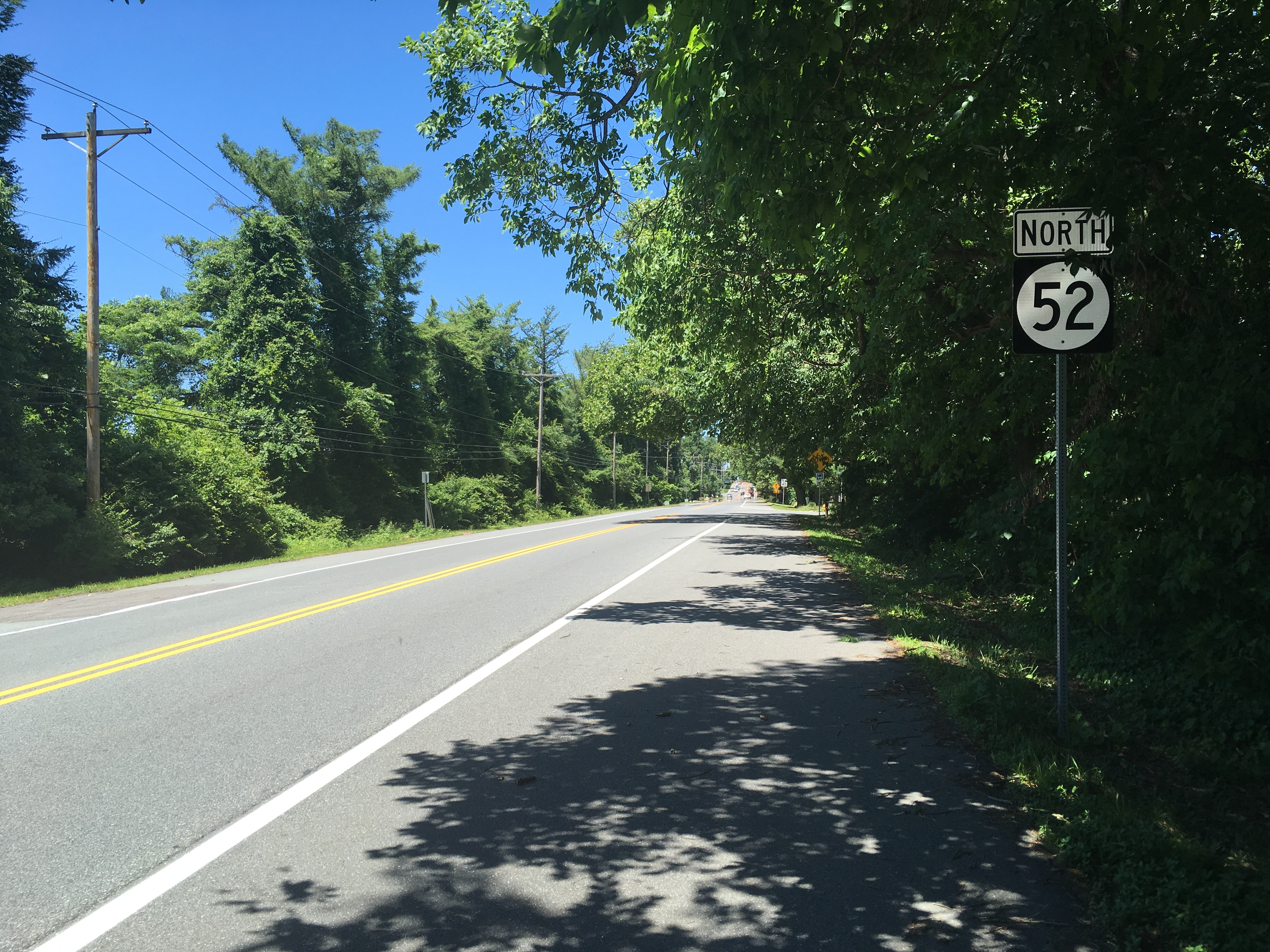
DE 52 northbound north of Greenville

In the 20th century, the automobile rose to prominence and travelers demanded better roads. The alignment of Kennett Pike became home to the estates of many executives from the DuPont Company and other corporations in the early part of the century. Among the executives was DuPont Company secretary and treasurer Pierre S. du Pont, who came up with a plan to modernize Kennett Pike. In 1916, du Pont's plan to modernize the road would widen the turnpike to the same width as Pennsylvania Avenue in Wilmington, eliminate hazards such as narrow bridges, widen culverts, build a bridge near Brecks Lane in Wilmington, widen it to an improved road between 18 feet (5.5 m) and 25 feet (7.6 m), and grade the roadway to make it smooth and safe. Pierre S. du Pont's cousin, Colonel Henry A. du Pont, owned half the shares of the Wilmington and Kennett Turnpike Company and sold his shares to Pierre S. du Pont; he encouraged other shareholders to do so. Work on improving the highway would be delayed by World War I. By April 1919, Pierre S. du Pont owned nearly all the shares of the turnpike company. As a result of the acquisition of the road by du Pont, the toll gates were removed.

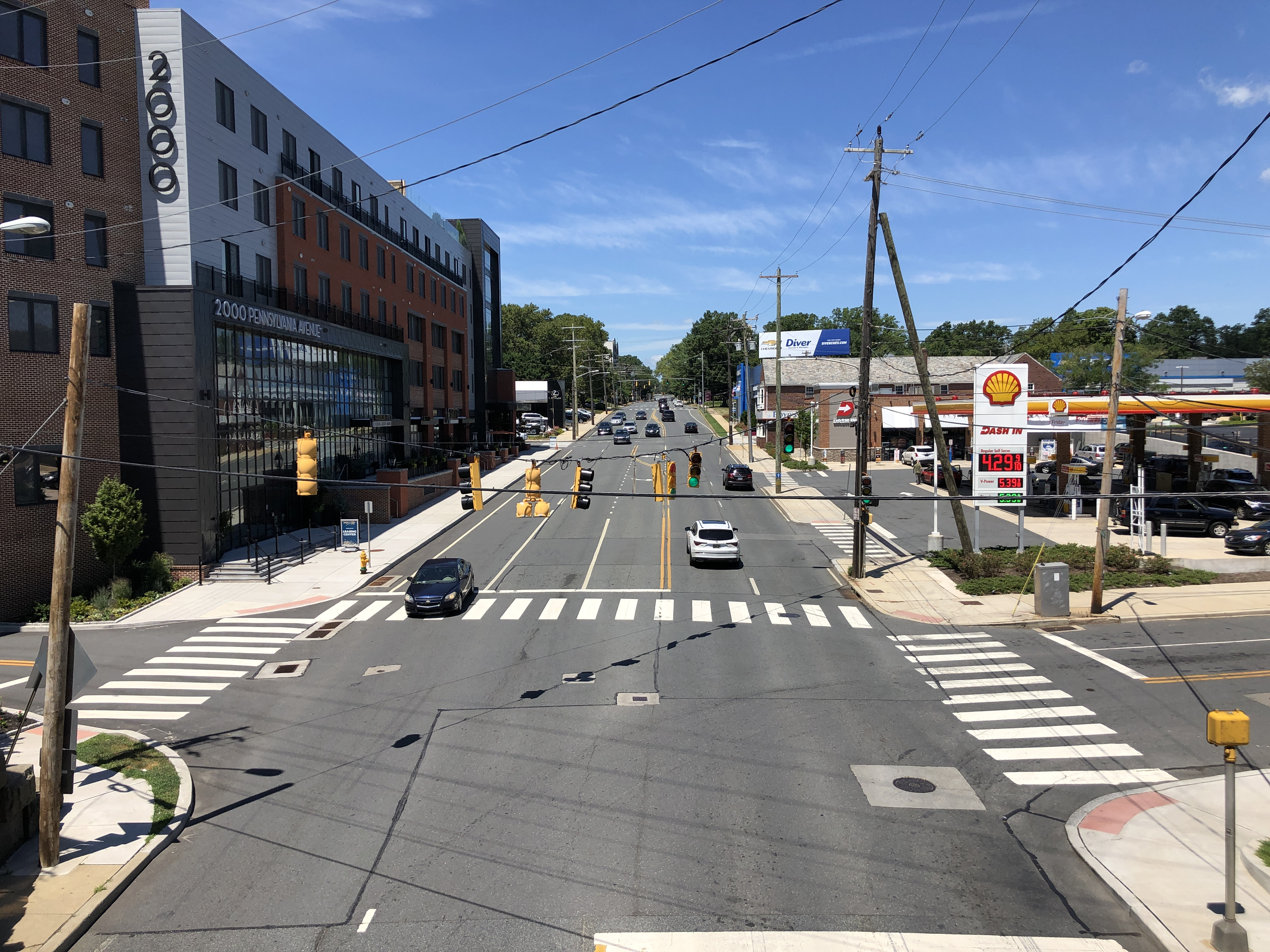
DE 52 northbound past DE 2 in Wilmington

Following the acquisition of the turnpike company, du Pont began widening and resurfacing the road. The engineering department of the DuPont Company laid out and design the roadway while subcontractors constructed the road. Work on improving the Kennett Pike began just north of the Pyles Ford Road intersection near Winterthur. By July 1919, 2,700 feet (820 m) of concrete had been poured along the road while right-of-way acquisition took place in Centerville. Grading of the northern section of the roadway from Winterthur to Centerville occurred by August of that year. By the end of September, excavation was almost finished and homes began to be moved for paving along the northern portion of the Kennett Pike. Also at this time, plans were made for the bridge at Brecks Lane and land acquisition took place along the road in Greenville. In the later part of 1919, final grading occurred in Centerville while excavation commenced in Greenville. On December 13, 1919, construction paused for the winter. Work on improving the Kennett Pike resumed in April 1920, with the sides of the road between Greenville and the Pennsylvania border dressed. By the end of the spring, nearly all the right-of-way had been acquired and paving of the roadway was being finished. The Kennett Pike opened partially to vehicles on June 12, 1920; the road would be fully opened by the end of July. The widening and paving of Kennett Pike cost $764,000. The roadway was 24 feet (7.3 m) wide and had a 3-foot (0.91 m) wide macadam shoulder. Following the completion of the project, du Pont sold the Kennett Pike to the Delaware State Highway Department for $1. In addition to improving Kennett Pike, du Pont also widened Pennsylvania Avenue in Wilmington, which connected the end of Kennett Pike at Greenhill Avenue to Delaware Avenue, which led to downtown Wilmington. Planning on improving the street began in 1917 and work began in 1919, starting near Riverview Avenue. Work on improving Pennsylvania Avenue progressed from north to south. Pennsylvania Avenue in Wilmington was widened during the 1920s.

When Delaware designated state highways by 1936, DE 52 was designated to run from US 13 (French Street) in Wilmington north to PA 52 at the Pennsylvania border in Centerville, following 11th Street, Delaware Avenue, and Pennsylvania Avenue in Wilmington and Kennett Pike between Wilmington and the state line. In 1939, the route was widened to four lanes between Rising Sun Lane and Barley Mill Road to alleviate traffic congestion during peak hours. The portion of DE 52 along Delaware Avenue was widened to four lanes in November 1940. By 1957, DE 52 was split into a one-way pair to reach its southern terminus at US 13 (now US 13 Bus.). In 2002, DE 52 was designated as part of the Brandywine Valley Scenic Highway in the Delaware Scenic and Historic Highways system; it was designated a National Scenic Byway in 2005.

== Major intersections ==
Mileposts run from north to south. The entire route is in New Castle County.

Location	mi	km	Destinations	Notes
Wilmington	7.87	12.67	US 13 Bus. north (North Walnut Street)	Southern terminus
Wilmington	7.76	12.49	US 13 Bus. south (North King Street)	
Wilmington	7.15	11.51	I-95 (US 202 / Wilmington Expressway) – Baltimore, Philadelphia	I-95/US 202 exit 7
Wilmington			DE 2 east (North Lincoln Street)	Eastern terminus of DE 2
Wilmington	6.38	10.27	DE 2 west (North Union Street)	Eastern terminus of DE 2
Greenville	4.93	7.93	Montchanin Road to DE 100 north / DE 141 north	
Greenville	4.62	7.44	DE 100 south / DE 141 south (Barley Mill Road)	Interchange; no access from southbound DE 100/DE 141 to southbound DE 52 or from DE 52 to northbound DE 100/DE 141
Greenville	3.32	5.34	DE 82 north (Campbell Road) – Mt. Cuba, Ashland, Yorklyn	Southern terminus of DE 82
Centerville	0.00	0.00	PA 52 north (Kennett Pike)	Pennsylvania state line; northern terminus
1.000 mi = 1.609 km; 1.000 km = 0.621 mi: Incomplete access
