= Delaware Route 34 =

State highway in New Castle County, Delaware, United States

Delaware Route 34
- Faulkland Road

Route information
- Maintained by DelDOT
- Length: 3.30 mi (5.31 km)
- Existed: 1974–2019

Major junctions
- West end: Duncan Road near Prices Corner
- DE 41 near Prices Corner; DE 141 near Prices Corner
- East end: DE 100 near Elsmere

Location
- Country: United States
- State: Delaware
- Counties: New Castle

Highway system
- Delaware State Route System; List; Byways
← DE 32	→ DE 36

Delaware Route 34 (DE 34), also known as Faulkland Road, was a numbered state highway in New Castle County, Delaware. The route ran from an intersection with unnumbered Duncan Road, just west of DE 41, north of Prices Corner east to DE 100 near Elsmere. Along the way, the route intersected DE 41 and DE 141 as it passed through suburban areas to the west of Wilmington. The road was paved in the 1930s and designated DE 34 in 1974. The DE 34 designation was removed from Faulkland Road in 2019.

== Route description ==
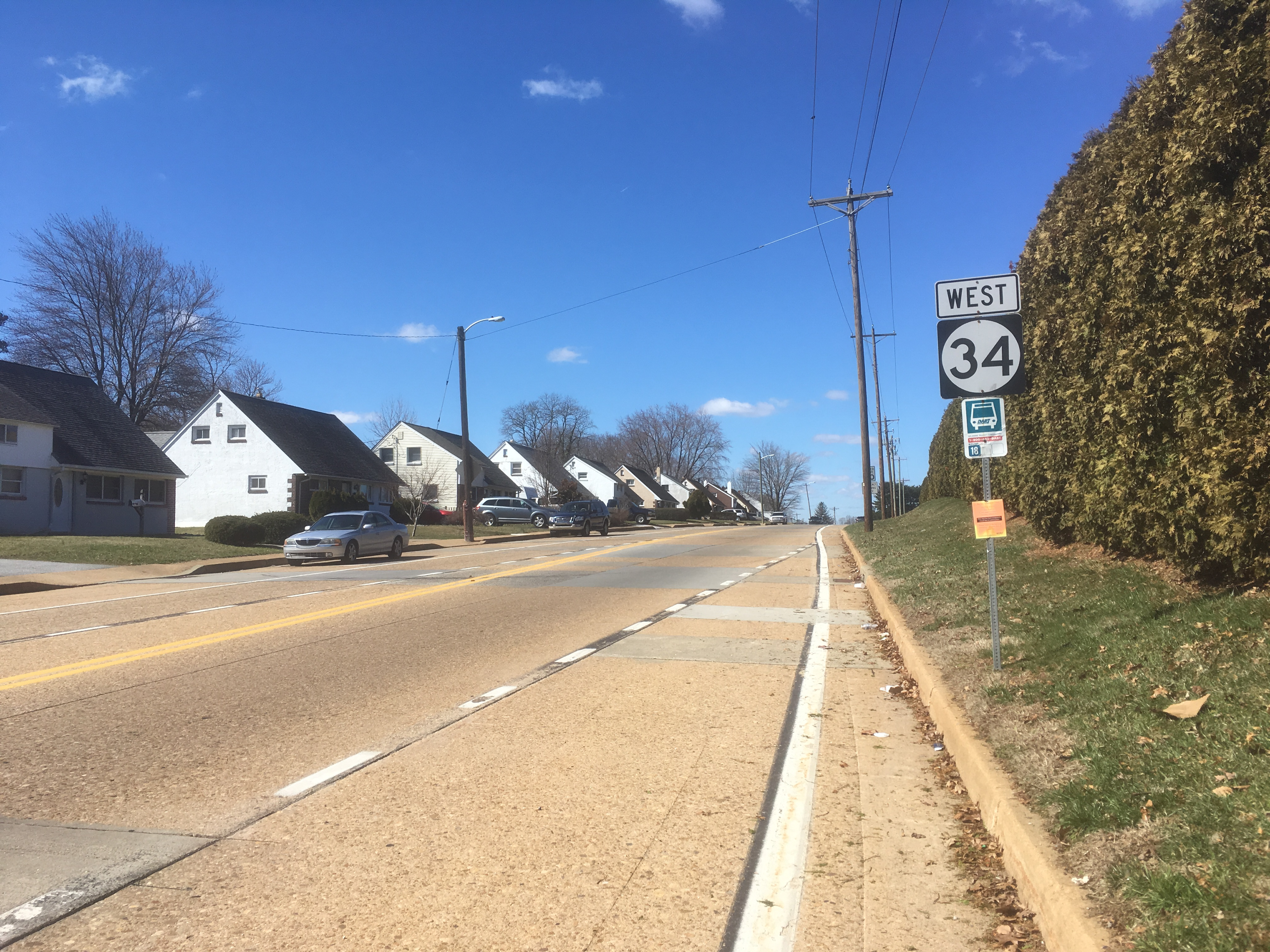
DE 34 westbound approaching DE 141 west of Wilmington in 2018

DE 34 began at an intersection with Duncan Road north of Prices Corner and headed east on two-lane undivided Faulkland Road through wooded areas and homes, crossing Hyde Run. The route intersected DE 41 and passed north of Brandywine Springs Park, where a park and pool lot is located, before it crossed Red Clay Creek and the Wilmington and Western Railroad at-grade. The road continued east through suburban neighborhoods, crossing Centerville Road. Farther east, DE 34 ran through residential and commercial areas, crossing Little Mill Creek before it came to an intersection with DE 141. Past this junction, the route passed to the south of DuPont's Chestnut Run Plaza research facility and headed across Chestnut Run. DE 34 crossed an East Penn Railroad line at-grade and ran between two cemeteries before ending at DE 100 north of the town of Elsmere, just west of the western city limit of Wilmington.

DE 34 had an annual average daily traffic count ranging from a high of 9,141 vehicles at the DE 100 intersection to a low of 3,482 vehicles at the DE 41 intersection.

== History ==
Faulkland Road originally existed as a county road by 1920. By 1936, the road was paved. DE 34 was designated onto Faulkland Road in 1974 in order to give "proper recognition" to the important connector road that linked DE 41, DE 141, and DE 100. In 2019, the Delaware Department of Transportation proposed removing the DE 34 designation from Faulkland Road in order to reduce traffic volumes and truck traffic along the road, which runs mostly through residential areas. The removal of the designation occurred in the middle part of 2019.

== Major intersections ==
The entire route was in New Castle County.

Location	mi	km	Destinations	Notes
Prices Corner	0.00	0.00	Duncan Road	Western terminus
Prices Corner	0.23	0.37	DE 41 (Newport Gap Pike)	
Prices Corner	2.17	3.49	DE 141 (Centre Road)	
Elsmere	3.30	5.31	DE 100 (Dupont Road) to DE 2	Eastern terminus
1.000 mi = 1.609 km; 1.000 km = 0.621 mi
