= Delaware Route 48 =

State highway in New Castle County, Delaware, United States

Delaware Route 48

Route information
- Maintained by DelDOT
- Length: 7.09 mi (11.41 km)
- Existed: 1936–present

Major junctions
- West end: DE 41 in Hockessin
- DE 100 / DE 141 near Wilmington; DE 2 in Wilmington; I-95 / US 202 in Wilmington; DE 4 in Wilmington
- East end: US 13 Bus. in Wilmington

Location
- Country: United States
- State: Delaware
- Counties: New Castle

Highway system
- Delaware State Route System; List; Byways
← DE 44	→ DE 52

Delaware Route 48 (DE 48) is a state highway in New Castle County, Delaware. The route runs from DE 41 in Hockessin east to U.S. Route 13 Business (US 13 Bus.) in downtown Wilmington. The route passes through suburban areas of Wilmington along Lancaster Pike, intersecting DE 100 and DE 141. DE 48 continues into Wilmington as Lancaster Avenue and intersects DE 2, where it splits into the one-way pair of Lancaster Avenue eastbound and Second Street westbound. Upon reaching downtown Wilmington, the route intersects Interstate 95 (I-95)/US 202 and DE 4 before continuing to the eastern terminus.

What is now DE 48 was originally built as the Lancaster Pike in 1817, a turnpike that was to connect Wilmington to the Gap and Newport Turnpike. The turnpike became county-maintained in 1877. The Lancaster Pike was designated DE 48 by 1936, with the route continuing east through Wilmington to the Wilmington-Penns Grove Ferry across the Delaware River, where it connected to Route 48 in Penns Grove, New Jersey. The ferry was discontinued in 1949 and the eastern terminus of DE 48 was cut back to its current location by 1952.

== Route description ==
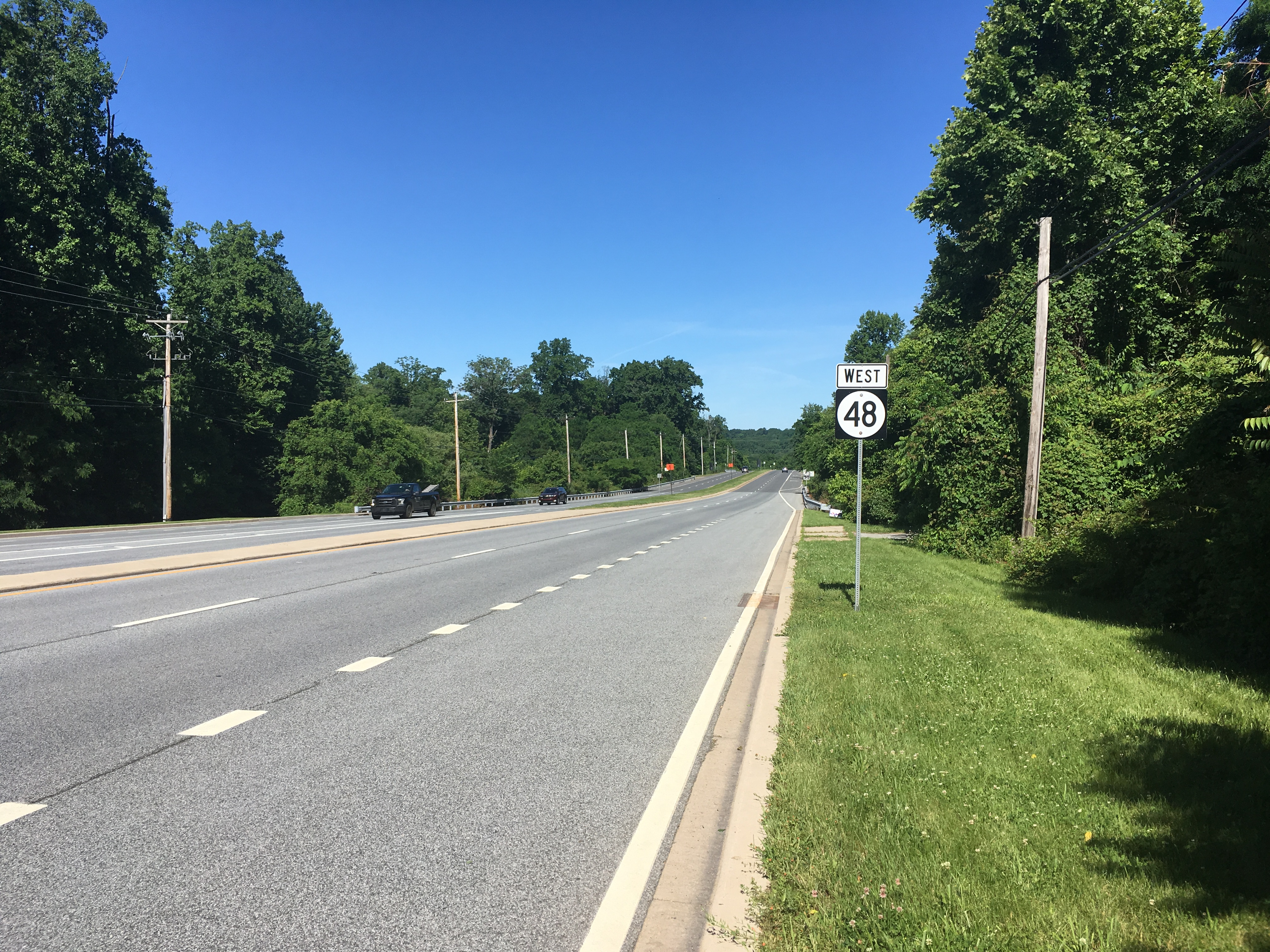
DE 48 westbound past Centerville Road west of Wilmington

DE 48 begins at an intersection with DE 41 in Hockessin, heading southeast on Lancaster Pike, a two-lane undivided road. The road runs through wooded areas and residential development, crossing Loveville Road and Hyde Run before curving east and gaining a westbound truck lane as it descends a hill. The route widens into a four-lane divided highway before crossing the Wilmington and Western Railroad at-grade and Red Clay Creek. The road passes residential areas and business parks as it crosses Centerville Road. DE 48 crosses Little Mill Creek and comes to an intersection with DE 100/DE 141, at which point DE 100 forms a concurrency with DE 48. The two routes head southeast as a four-lane undivided road, crossing Chestnut Run and passing through residential and commercial areas. The road crosses an East Penn Railroad line at-grade and runs to the north of a cemetery, with DE 100 splitting from DE 48 by turning south on South Dupont Road as it passes south of the Cab Calloway School of the Arts and Charter School of Wilmington.

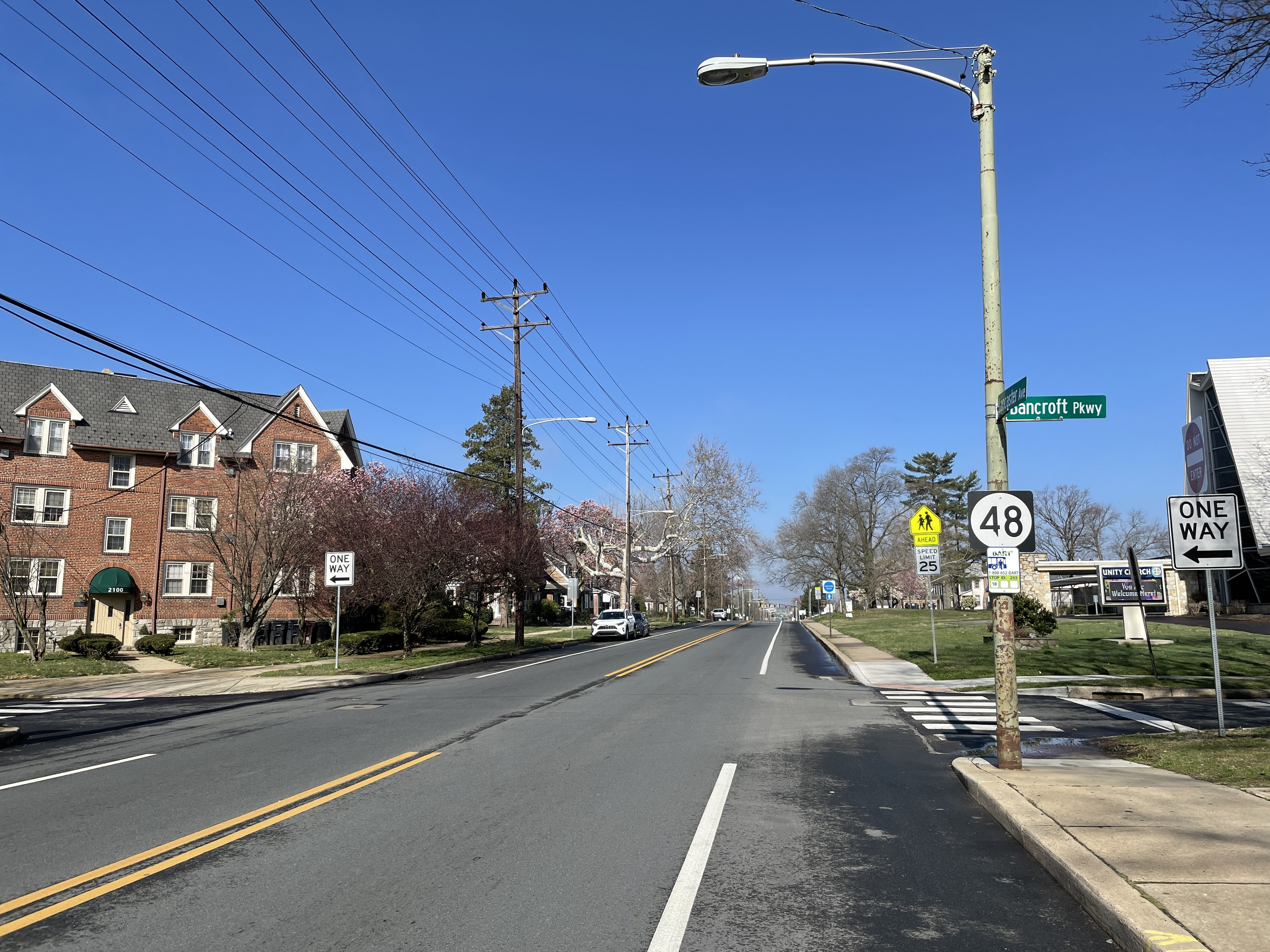
DE 48 westbound at Bancroft Parkway in Wilmington

DE 48 continues into the city of Wilmington as Lancaster Avenue and heads into urban areas of homes and businesses, with the eastbound direction narrowing to one lane at the intersection with Greenhill Avenue. Following this intersection, the route crosses over CSX's Philadelphia Subdivision railroad line on a bridge. The road narrows to two lanes and passes to the north of another cemetery. The route intersects DE 2, which follows the one-way pair of Lincoln Street northbound and Union Street southbound, in the Union Park Gardens neighborhood.

At this point, DE 48 itself splits into a one-way pair that follows Lancaster Avenue eastbound and West Second Street westbound, with westbound DE 48 using westbound DE 2 (North Union Street) to get from West Second Street to Lancaster Avenue. The one-way pair carries two lanes in each direction. DE 48 continues into downtown Wilmington, where it crosses under a viaduct carrying I-95/US 202, with ramp connections to and from the southbound direction of I-95/US 202 via Jackson Street, which parallels I-95/US 202 to the west.

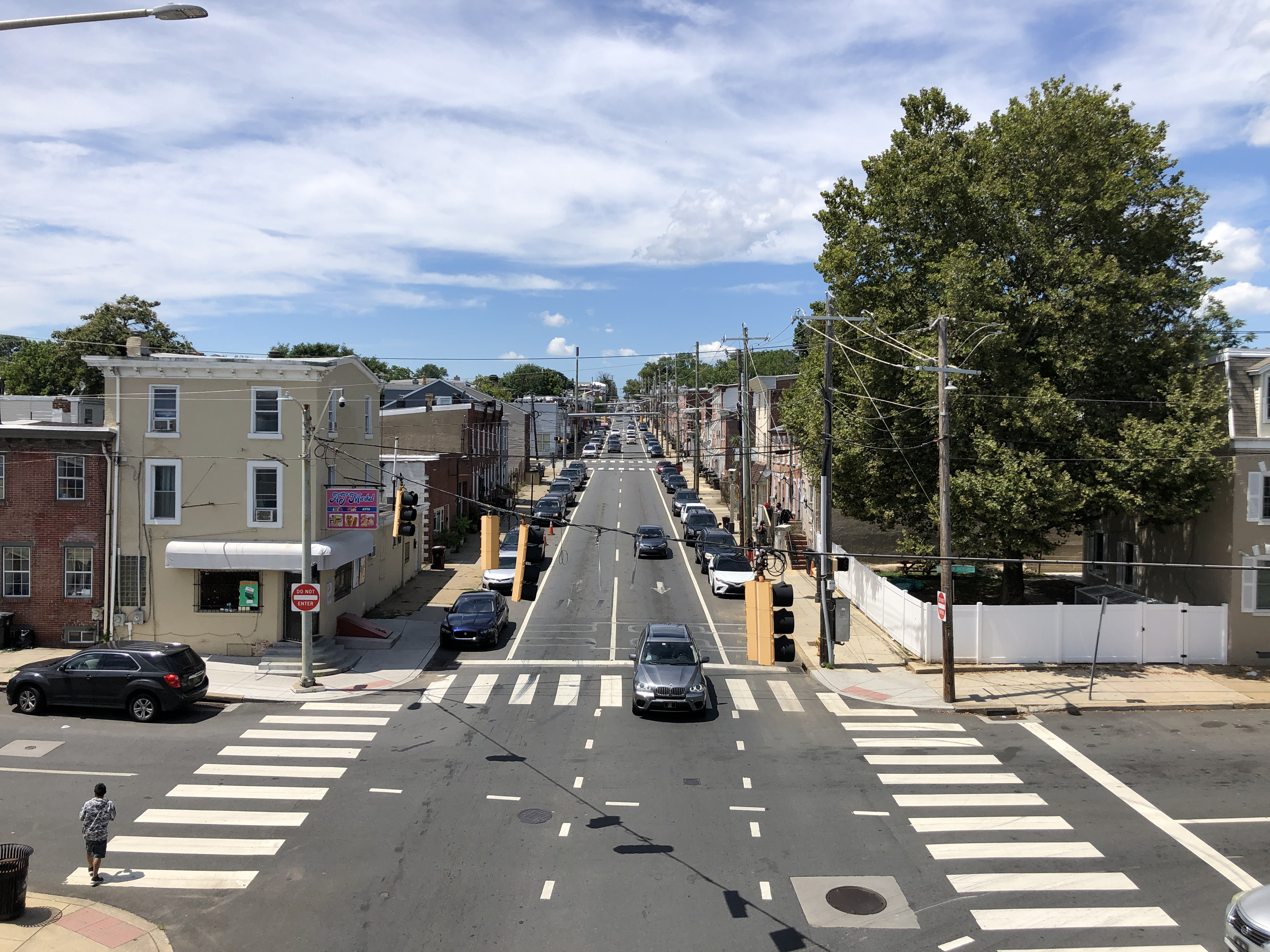
View westbound along DE 48 eastbound (Lancaster Avenue) in Wilmington

Upon crossing under I-95/US 202, a westbound ramp to I-95/US 202 complements the eastbound direction of DE 48, with the road becoming Martin Luther King Jr. Boulevard, a six-lane divided highway. Westbound DE 48 remains along one-way West Second Street, which carries three lanes. DE 48 intersects the eastern terminus of DE 4, which provides access to DE 48 from the northbound direction of I-95/US 202. The one-way pair continues further into the downtown, passing to the south of the Orlando J. George, Jr. Campus of Delaware Technical Community College, and runs a short distance to the north of Amtrak's Northeast Corridor railroad line. The route intersects the southbound direction of US 13 Bus., which shifts west from North King Street to South Market Street where it intersects DE 48. At this point, the westbound direction of Martin Luther King Jr. Boulevard ends. Following the intersection with US 13 Bus. southbound, DE 48 follows the one-way pair of Front Street eastbound and East Second Street westbound. Along this stretch, the route passes to the north of Wilmington Station along the Northeast Corridor that serves Amtrak and SEPTA's Wilmington/Newark Line, with the train station's parking garage and the Wilmington Bus Station serving Greyhound Lines buses located between Front Street and East Second Street west of the French Street intersection. DE 48 reaches its eastern terminus at an intersection with the northbound direction of US 13 Bus., which follows Walnut Street, west of the Wilmington Transit Center serving DART First State buses.

DE 48 has an annual average daily traffic count ranging from a high of 38,923 vehicles at the DE 4 intersection to a low of 11,223 vehicles at the Loveville Road intersection near Hockessin. The entire length of DE 48 is part of the National Highway System.

== History ==
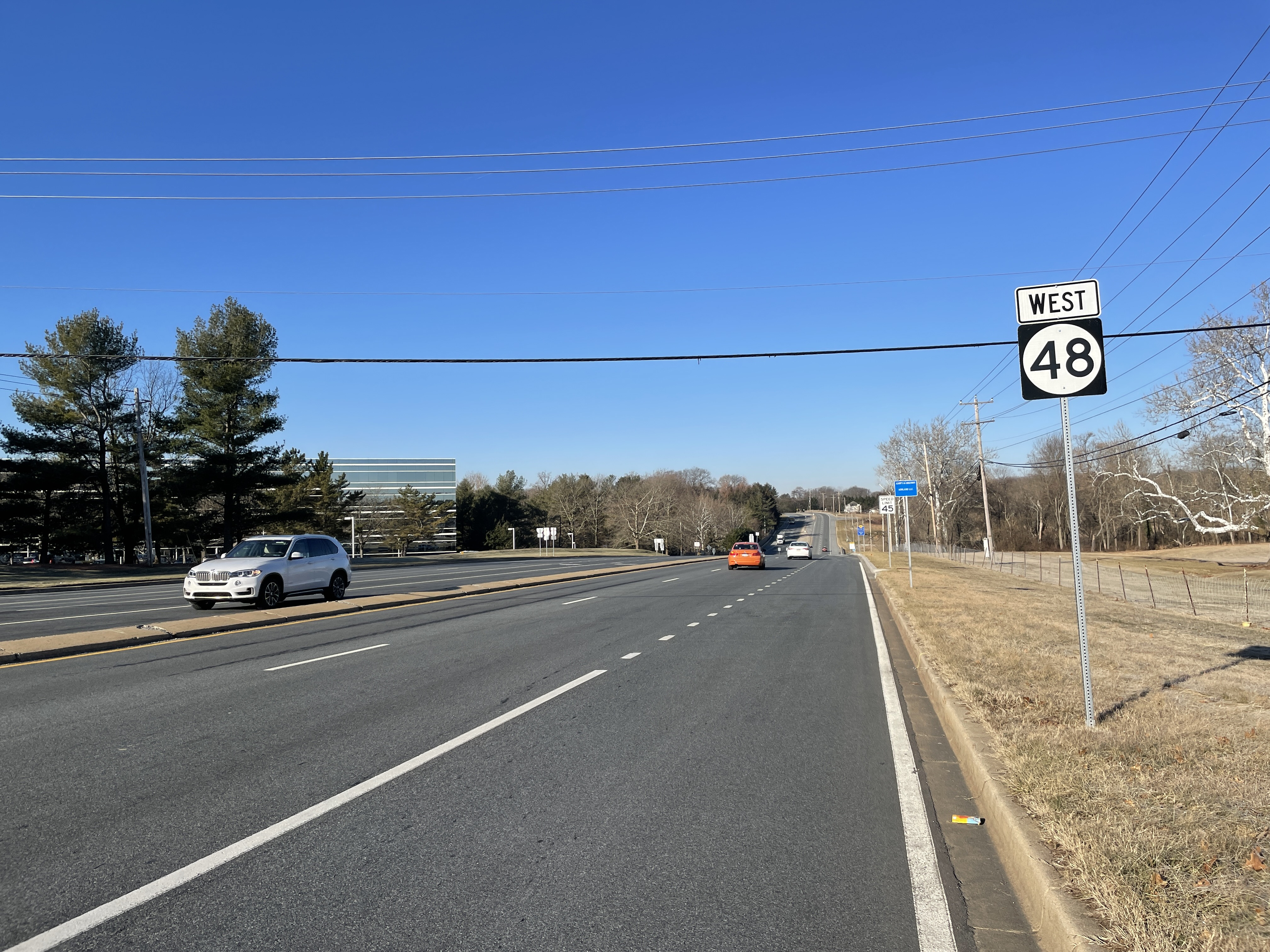
DE 48 westbound past DE 100/DE 141 west of Wilmington

The Wilmington Turnpike Company was founded on October 23, 1809, to build a turnpike from Wilmington to the Pennsylvania border, connecting to the Gap and Newport Turnpike. The turnpike was completed in 1817 at a cost of $39,549.97. The turnpike became known as the Lancaster Pike and was surfaced with stone. The Wilmington Turnpike Company operated the Lancaster Pike until 1877 when they abandoned the road. The turnpike's charter was repealed and the road was then under the control of the county levy court. The road leading from Wilmington to the Wilmington-Penns Grove Ferry across the Delaware River to Penns Grove, New Jersey, was completed as a state highway by 1931.

By 1936, the Lancaster Pike became a part of DE 48. In addition, the route continued through Wilmington on Lincoln Street, Fourth Street, and Christina Avenue to the ferry across the Delaware River to Penns Grove, New Jersey, which linked DE 48 to Route 48 in New Jersey. In 1939, DE 48 was rebuilt between DE 41 and Centre Road, eliminating curves and grades. In 1949, the Wilmington-Penns Grove Ferry was discontinued. DE 48 was realigned onto Lancaster Avenue to continue to US 13/US 202 (now US 13 Bus.), its current eastern terminus, by 1952. By 1990, DE 100 was realigned to follow a portion of DE 48, bypassing a part of Dupont Road. DE 48 was widened into a divided highway at the DE 141 intersection by 1996. The divided highway was extended west to Centerville Road a year later.

== Major intersections ==
The entire route is in New Castle County.

Location	mi	km	Destinations	Notes
Hockessin	0.00	0.00	DE 41 (Lancaster Pike/Newport Gap Pike)	Western terminus
Wilmington	3.83	6.16	DE 100 north / DE 141 (Centre Road) to I-95 south / I-295 – Newport	West end of DE 100 overlap
Wilmington	4.86	7.82	DE 100 south (South Dupont Road)	East end of DE 100 overlap
Wilmington	5.69	9.16	DE 2 west (Union Street)	DE 48 splits into one-way pair; brief overlap between westbound DE 2 and westbound DE 48
Wilmington			DE 2 east (Lincoln Street)	
Wilmington	6.40	10.30	I-95 (US 202 / Wilmington Expressway) – Baltimore, Philadelphia	Interchange; access from northbound I-95/US 202 provided by DE 4; I-95/US 202 exit 6
Wilmington	6.56	10.56	DE 4 west (Maryland Avenue/Monroe Street)	Eastern terminus of DE 4
Wilmington	6.98	11.23	US 13 Bus. south (North King Street/South Market Street)	
Wilmington	7.09	11.41	US 13 Bus. north (Walnut Street) – Center City	Eastern terminus
1.000 mi = 1.609 km; 1.000 km = 0.621 mi: Concurrency terminus; Incomplete access
