= Delaware Route 141 =

Highway in Delaware

Delaware Route 141

Route information
- Maintained by DelDOT
- Length: 11.60 mi (18.67 km)
- Existed: 1952–present

Major junctions
- South end: DE 9 / DE 273 in New Castle
- US 13 / US 40 in Wilmington Manor; DE 37 near Wilmington Manor; I-95 / US 202 / I-295 / I-495 near Wilmington; DE 4 in Newport; DE 62 in Belvedere; DE 2 in Prices Corner; DE 48 / DE 100 near Prices Corner; DE 52 in Greenville; DE 100 in Greenville
- North end: US 202 / DE 261 near Fairfax

Location
- Country: United States
- State: Delaware
- Counties: New Castle

Highway system
- Delaware State Route System; List; Byways
| ← US 122 | → US 202 |

Delaware Route 141 (DE 141) is a state highway that serves as a western bypass of Wilmington, Delaware. Its southern terminus is at DE 9 and DE 273 in New Castle and its northern terminus is an interchange with U.S. Route 202 (US 202) and DE 261 near Fairfax. The route heads north from DE 9 and DE 273 on four-lane divided Basin Road, becoming concurrent with US 202 at an interchange with US 13/US 40 in Wilmington Manor, and passes to the east of Wilmington Airport. The highway becomes a freeway and reaches an interchange with Interstate 95 (I-95), at which point US 202 splits from DE 141. The DE 141 freeway continues north through Newport to Prices Corner. Here, the freeway segment ends and DE 141 continues northeast as a surface road, with another brief freeway segment in Greenville. The route heads east across the Brandywine Creek on the Tyler-McConnell Bridge and continues to US 202 and DE 261.

What is now DE 141 between New Castle and Newport was originally designated as part of DE 41 in the 1930s. DE 141 was designated as a surface bypass of Wilmington between New Castle and US 202 north of Wilmington in the 1950s, running concurrent with DE 41 south of Newport. DE 41 was removed from DE 141 by 1971. In the 1960s, DE 141 was proposed to be upgraded to a freeway. Construction on the freeway segments between Newport and Prices Corner and in Greenville began in the 1970s and was completed around 1980. In the 1990s, several improvements were planned for DE 141 north of Prices Corner, including grade separation at Rockland Road completed in 1997 and relocation of the northern terminus to its current location at an interchange with US 202 and DE 261 finished in 2007.

== Route description ==
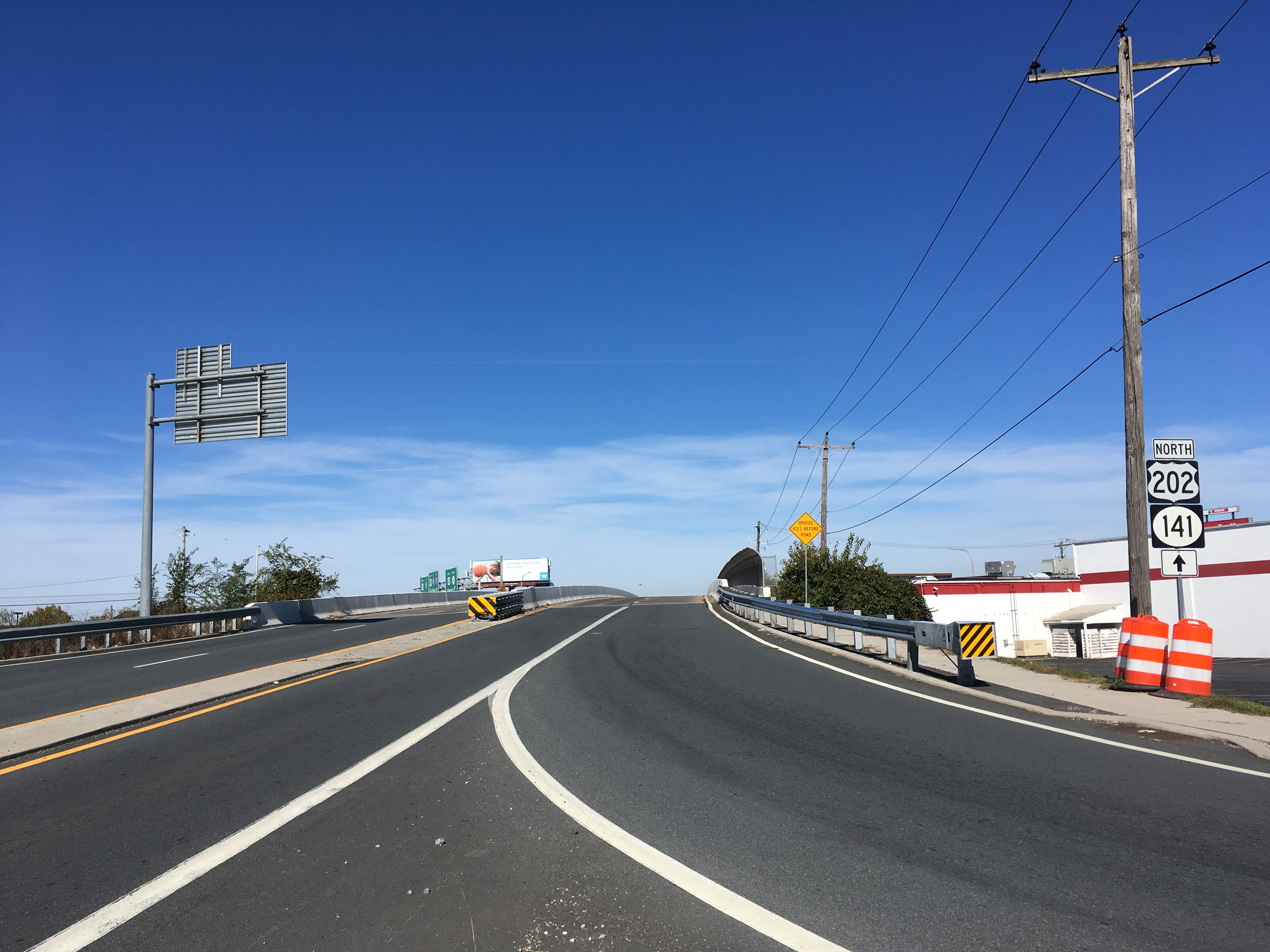
US 202/DE 141 northbound at US 13/US 40 interchange in Wilmington Manor

DE 141 begins at an intersection with DE 9 and the eastern terminus of DE 273 west of the city of New Castle, where the road continues south as part of DE 9. From the southern terminus, DE 141 heads northwest on Basin Road, a four-lane divided highway. The road passes to the east of William Penn High School and continues past suburban homes and businesses. The route reaches a partial cloverleaf interchange with US 13/US 40 east of the Wilmington Airport, at which point US 202 begins.

From here, US 202 runs concurrently with DE 141, with the two routes heading between Wilmington Airport to the west and residential neighborhoods in Wilmington Manor to the east. The road passes between the Delaware Air National Guard's New Castle Air National Guard Base to the west and commercial establishments to the east, coming to a junction with the northern terminus of DE 37. Past this junction, the median of US 202/DE 141 widens as the road intersects Airport Road.

After intersecting Airport Road, US 202/DE 141 becomes a freeway. The road comes to an interchange with I-95 (Delaware Turnpike) and the southern terminus of I-295, at which point US 202 splits from DE 141 by continuing north along I-95. Past this interchange, DE 141 widens to six lanes and has a southbound exit and entrance for South James Street and Old Airport Road before the median narrows. The freeway comes to a viaduct that crosses the Christina River into the town of Newport, where it heads near industrial areas and passes over Amtrak's Northeast Corridor railroad line.

In Newport, the route has an interchange with DE 4, at which point it narrows to four lanes and curves northwest with North James Street serving as a frontage road on both sides. The freeway widens back to six lanes and heads into a below-grade alignment that cuts through residential neighborhoods, leaving Newport. At this point, the frontage roads on both sides of the highway become Newport Gap Pike. DE 141 reaches an interchange with DE 62 in the community of Belvedere, where the Newport Gap Pike frontage road ends and the freeway narrows to four lanes. Following this interchange, the six-lane freeway rises to ground level and passes to the west of commercial development before coming to a bridge over CSX's Philadelphia Subdivision railroad line. The road runs near business areas and has a partial cloverleaf interchange with DE 2 in Prices Corner.

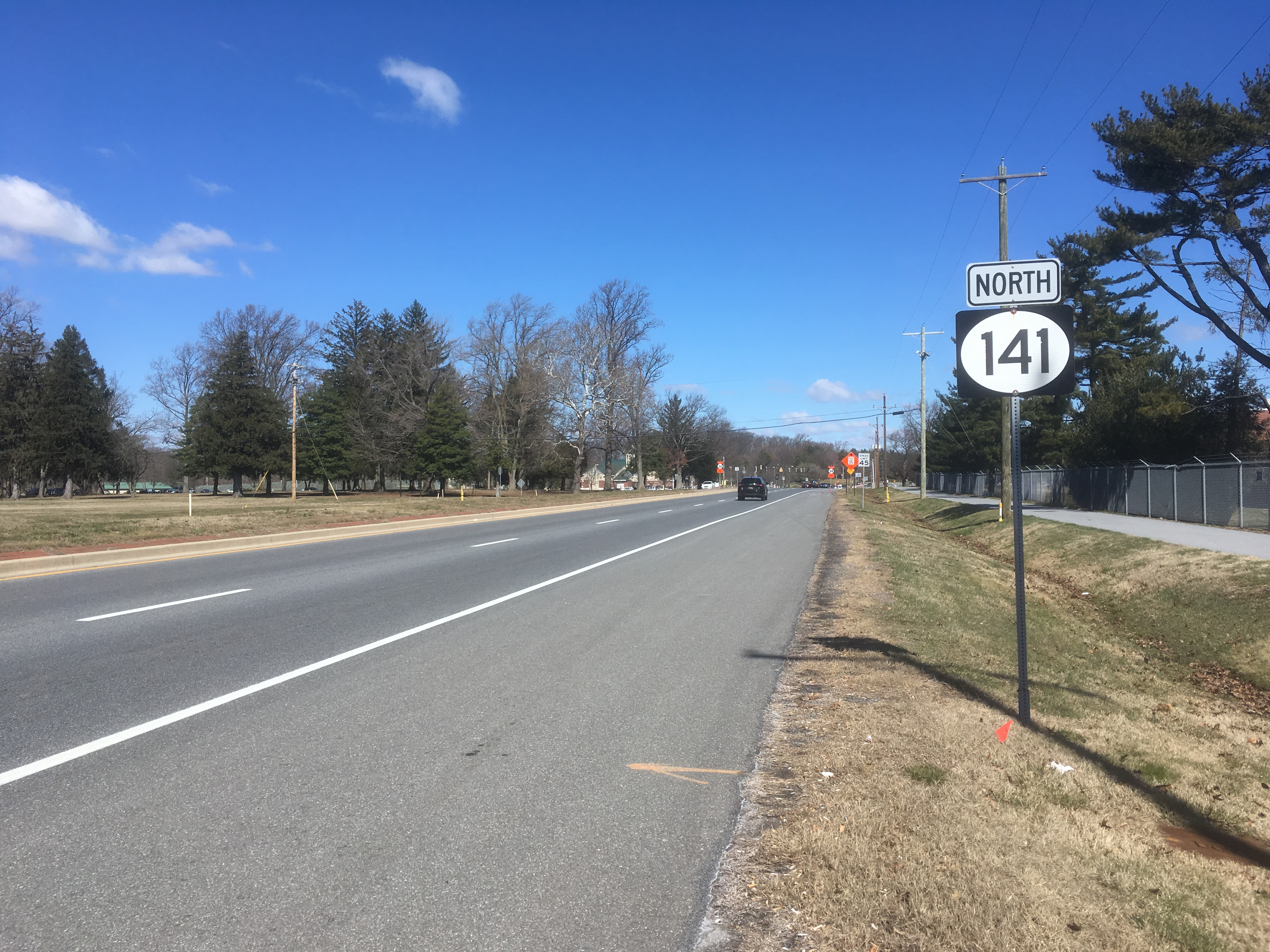
DE 141 northbound past Faulkland Road west of Wilmington

After the DE 2 interchange, the freeway section of DE 141 ends and the route continues northeast on at-grade Centre Road, a four-lane divided highway. The road passes through suburban residential neighborhoods, crossing Little Mill Creek, and reaches an intersection with Faulkland Road. Following this intersection, the route heads north between the Ferris School to the west and DuPont's Chestnut Run Plaza research facility to the east. DE 141 curves to the northeast and comes to a junction with DE 48/DE 100. Here, DE 100 joins DE 141 and the road runs to the west of commercial areas, curving north past the Barley Mill Road intersection. The roadway curves northeast and passes under an East Penn Railroad line before coming to a partial cloverleaf interchange with DE 52 in Greenville. This interchange has no access from DE 100/DE 141 southbound to DE 52 southbound or from DE 52 to DE 100/DE 141 northbound. Past this interchange, the road curves east, with DE 100 splitting from DE 141 at an at-grade intersection by heading north on Montchanin Road. Montchanin Road heads south from this intersection to provide access to DE 52.

Past this intersection, DE 141 continues east as four-lane divided Barley Mill Road, heading into wooded areas. The route becomes a two-lane undivided road as it passes to the south of the Hagley Museum and Library before crossing over the Brandywine Creek valley on the Tyler-McConnell Bridge. Past the bridge, DE 141 turns northeast onto four-lane undivided Powder Mill Road, forming the northwestern boundary of the DuPont Experimental Station. The road widens into a divided highway and runs between the Nemours Mansion and Gardens to the east and the DuPont Country Club to the northwest. The route passes to the west of Nemours Children's Hospital, Delaware before coming to a bridge over Rockland Road. DE 141 makes a sharp curve to the southeast and comes to an intersection where Powder Mill Road splits to the east and Childrens Drive heads southwest to provide access to Rockland Road and the children's hospital. The route continues southeast as it runs to the south of a JPMorgan Chase office complex. DE 141 curves east, heading to the north of Alapocas Run State Park, and comes to its northern terminus at an interchange with US 202 south of Fairfax in Blue Ball, where the road continues northeast as DE 261.

In 2016, DE 141 had an annual average daily traffic count ranging from a high of 68,105 vehicles at the DE 4 interchange to a low of 15,466 vehicles at the University Avenue intersection between DE 9/DE 273 and US 13/US 40. The entire length of DE 141 is part of the National Highway System.

== History ==
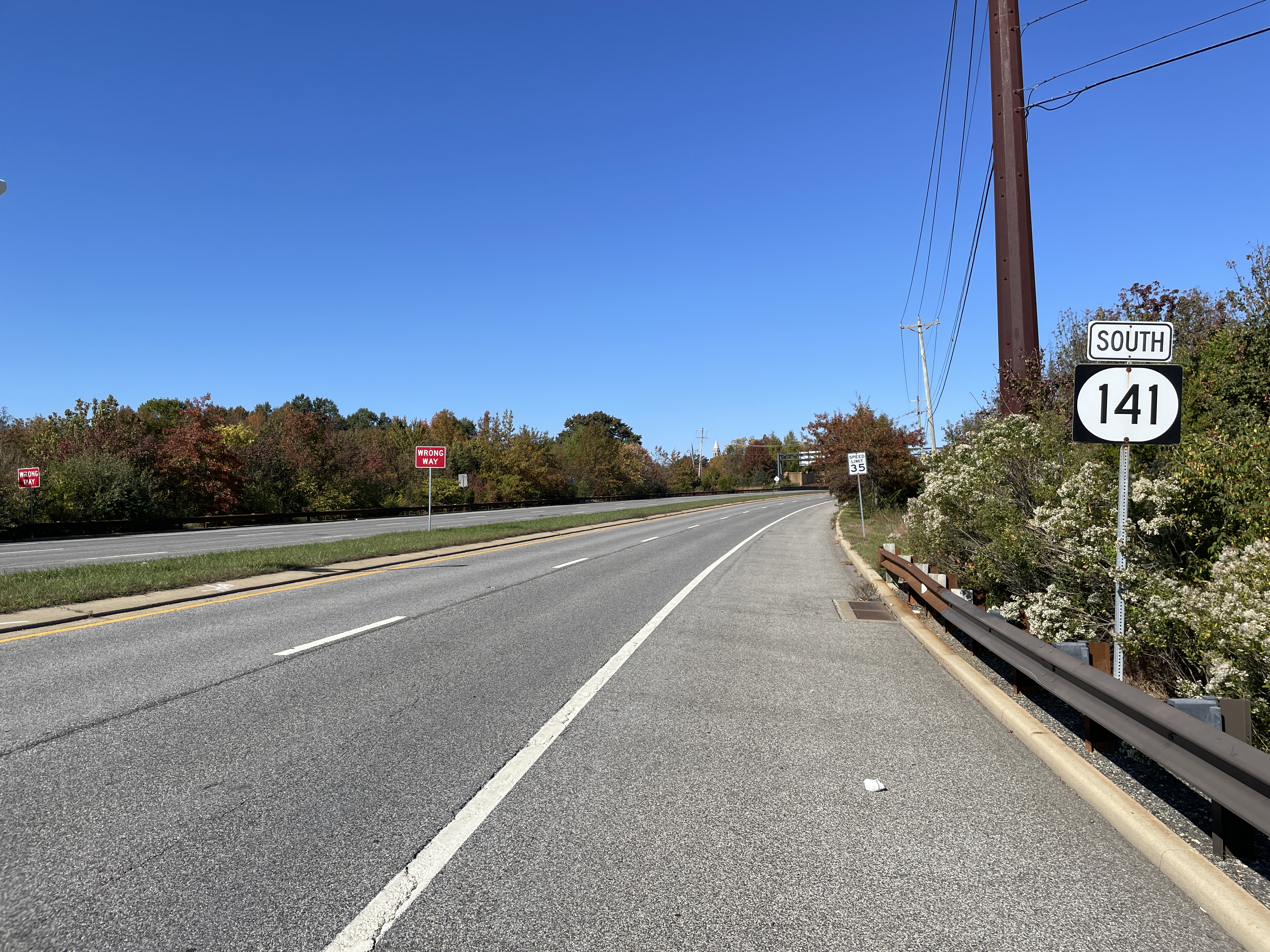
DE 141 southbound past northern terminus at US 202 and DE 261 in Fairfax

By 1920, what would become DE 141 existed as an unimproved county road. The road between Prices Corner and Greenville was paved by 1924. A year later, the road between New Castle and Newport was upgraded to a state highway. Plans were underway in 1927 to replace the outdated swing bridge over the Christina River in Newport. Contracts for this project were awarded the following year. The replacement bridge over the Christina River, a bascule bridge, opened on December 1, 1929. In 1927, plans were made to replace the grade crossing at the Pennsylvania Railroad line (now Amtrak's Northeast Corridor) in Newport with an underpass under the tracks. Work on this underpass began in 1929. The crossing under the Pennsylvania Railroad was finished and opened to traffic in June 1930. What is now DE 141 between New Castle and Newport was designated as part of DE 41 by 1936, which continued northwest from Newport toward Hockessin and the Pennsylvania state line. Also by this time, Powder Mill Road was paved.

DE 141 was designated to run from DE 273 in New Castle to US 202 north of Wilmington by 1952, following DE 41 on Basin Road and James Street between New Castle and Newport, Centerville Road between Newport and Prices Corner, and Centre Road, Barley Mill Road, and Powder Mill Road between Prices Corner and US 202. In 1954, plans were made to replace the intersection with US 13/US 40/US 202 in Basin Corner with a modified cloverleaf interchange in an effort to reduce traffic congestion. Construction on the interchange began in September of that year. The interchange between US 13/US 40/US 202 and DE 41/DE 141 was completed in 1956. Work was underway in 1954 to widen DE 141 to four lanes along Centerville and Centre roads from Boxwood Road near Prices Corner north to DE 48; this project was completed in 1955. The new northbound lanes of DE 41/DE 141 through the I-95 interchange opened in November 1962, at which point construction on the southbound lanes began. The southbound lanes of DE 41/DE 141 opened in June 1964, enabling directional flow of DE 41/DE 141 through the interchange. DE 41 was removed from its concurrency with DE 141 by 1971.

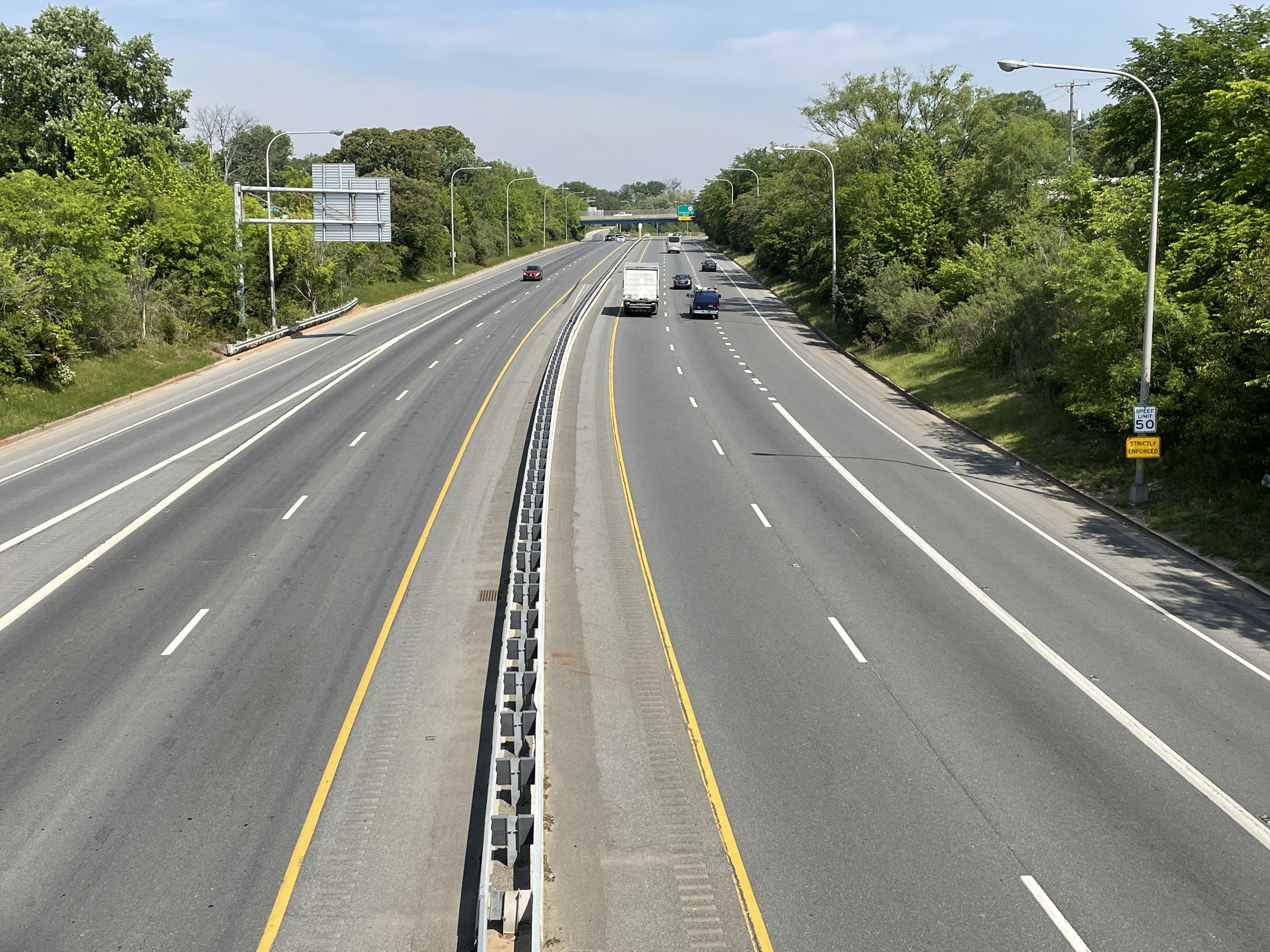
DE 141 northbound in Newport

In 1965, a $20 million ($150 million today) freeway was proposed along the DE 141 corridor between Newport and US 202 north of Wilmington, providing a bypass to the west of Wilmington. By 1971, the DE 141 freeway from Newport to Prices Corner was under design and the reconstruction of the route north of DE 48 began. The same year, a contract was awarded for construction of a grade separation of the Reading Railroad (now the East Penn Railroad) crossing in Greenville. In 1973, work started to upgrade DE 141 between the Christina River in Newport and the Brandywine Creek near Greenville. A contract was awarded to construct the DE 141 freeway through Newport in 1974. The construction of interchanges in Prices Corner and at DE 52 were included in the Bond Bill in 1976. The DE 141 freeway from Newport to Prices Corner and in Greenville was completed by 1981. In 1984, US 202 was rerouted to follow DE 141 between US 13/US 40 and I-95. DE 100 was rerouted to follow DE 141 between DE 48 and Montchanin Road by 1990.

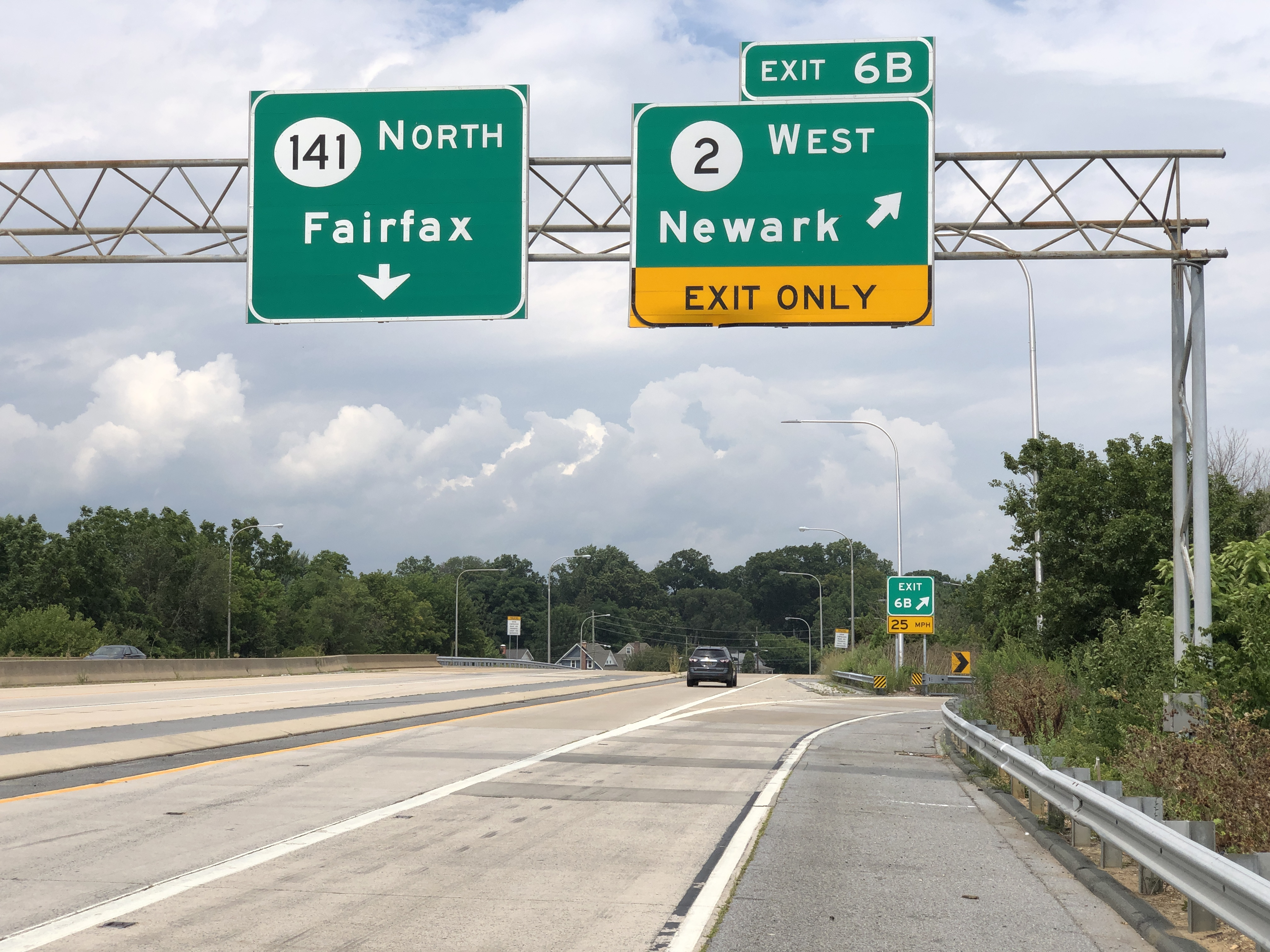
DE 141 northbound at the DE 2 interchange in Prices Corner

In 1992, an environmental assessment was approved for improving DE 141 between DE 2 and US 202. Among the improvements called for were a six-lane bridge over the Brandywine Creek replacing the existing two-lane bridge, a new bridge over Rockland Road, and a new interchange with US 202 and DE 261. Later in the year, the proposed bridge over the Brandywine Creek was scaled back to four lanes. In 1994, plans for the bridge over the Brandywine Creek and the US 202 interchange were placed on hold. Meanwhile, the bridge over Rockland Road was completed in 1997, with DE 141 being realigned between Rockland Road and US 202 and the intersection with Children's Drive improved. In the 2000s, the Blue Ball Construction Project relocated the northern terminus of DE 141 to an interchange with US 202 and DE 261 a short distance to the south of where Powder Mill Road intersects US 202. This interchange was constructed as part of the Blue Ball Properties project, a project undertaken to improve roads in this area as part of AstraZeneca locating their North American headquarters to the area. The project took place between 2002 and 2007 and cost $123 million. In 2007, construction began to upgrade the portion of DE 141 between DE 2 and DE 34 (Faulkland Road) from a four-lane undivided road into a four-lane divided highway. Completion of the project was scheduled for 2010.

In 2016, a project began to improve the interchange with I-95. The project reconstructed the bridges that carry DE 141 over I-95 and added safety improvements to the interchange ramps. In June 2016, the ramp from northbound I-95 to northbound DE 141 closed until June 2017 to allow for reconstruction of the bridge along northbound DE 141. Construction on improving the interchange with I-95 along with work on improving the section of DE 141 from US 13/US 40 north to DE 4 was completed in December 2021.

== Major intersections ==
The entire route is in New Castle County.

| Location | mi | km | Exit | Destinations | Notes |
|---|---|---|---|---|---|
| New Castle | 0.00 | 0.00 | | DE 9 (Delaware Street/Washington Street) – New Castle DE 273 west / DE 9 Truck south (Frenchtown Road) to US 13 / US 40 | Southern terminus; eastern terminus of DE 273; northern terminus of DE 9 Truck |
| Wilmington Manor | 1.29 | 2.08 | US 202 begins | | |
| Wilmington Manor | 1.29 | 2.08 | 1A | US 13 north / US 40 east – Wilmington, Delaware Memorial Bridge | Interchange |
| Wilmington Manor | 1.29 | 2.08 | 1B | US 13 south / US 40 west – Dover, Elkton, Baltimore | Interchange; no northbound exit; access from northbound via U-turn to southbound exit |
| Wilmington Manor | 2.31 | 3.72 | | DE 37 south (Commons Boulevard) | Northern terminus of DE 37 |
| Wilmington Manor | 2.65 | 4.26 | South end of freeway section | | |
| Newport | 2.70 | 4.35 | 2 | I-295 north – Delaware Memorial Bridge, New Jersey | Southbound exit and northbound entrance; southern terminus of I-295 |
| Newport | 2.75– 2.90 | 4.43– 4.67 | 3 | I-95 / US 202 north / I-495 north – Wilmington, Philadelphia, Newark, Baltimore | Signed as exits 3A (north) and 3B (south); north end of US 202 overlap; I-95 exit 5A-B |
| Newport | 2.97 | 4.78 | 4B | S. James Street / Old Airport Road | Southbound exit and entrance |
| Newport | 3.59 | 5.78 | 4A | DE 4 – Newport, Stanton | Signed as exit 4 northbound |
| Belvedere | 4.33 | 6.97 | 5 | DE 62 (Boxwood Road / Newport Gap Pike) | |
| Prices Corner | 5.38 | 8.66 | 6A | DE 2 east – Elsmere | Northbound exit |
| Prices Corner | 5.64 | 9.08 | 6B | DE 2 west – Newark | Northbound exit |
| Prices Corner | 5.91 | 9.51 | | To DE 2 (Kirkwood Highway) / Centerville Road | Southbound exit |
| Prices Corner | 5.95 | 9.58 | North end of freeway section | | |
| Prices Corner | 7.38 | 11.88 | | DE 48 / DE 100 south (Lancaster Pike) – Hockessin, Lancaster, Wilmington | South end of DE 100 overlap |
| Greenville | 8.57 | 13.79 | | DE 52 – Greenville, Wilmington | Interchange; no access from southbound DE 100/DE 141 to southbound DE 52 or from DE 52 to northbound DE 100/DE 141 |
| Greenville | 8.85 | 14.24 | | DE 100 north to DE 52 (Montchanin Road) – Wilmington | North end of DE 100 overlap |
| Blue Ball | 11.60 | 18.67 | | US 202 (Concord Pike) to I-95 – Wilmington, West Chester DE 261 north (Foulk Road) | Interchange; northern terminus; southern terminus of DE 261 |
1.000 mi = 1.609 km; 1.000 km = 0.621 mi: Concurrency terminus; Incomplete access
