= Mount Cuba Historic District =

Historic district in Delaware, United States

- U.S. National Register of Historic Places
- U.S. Historic district
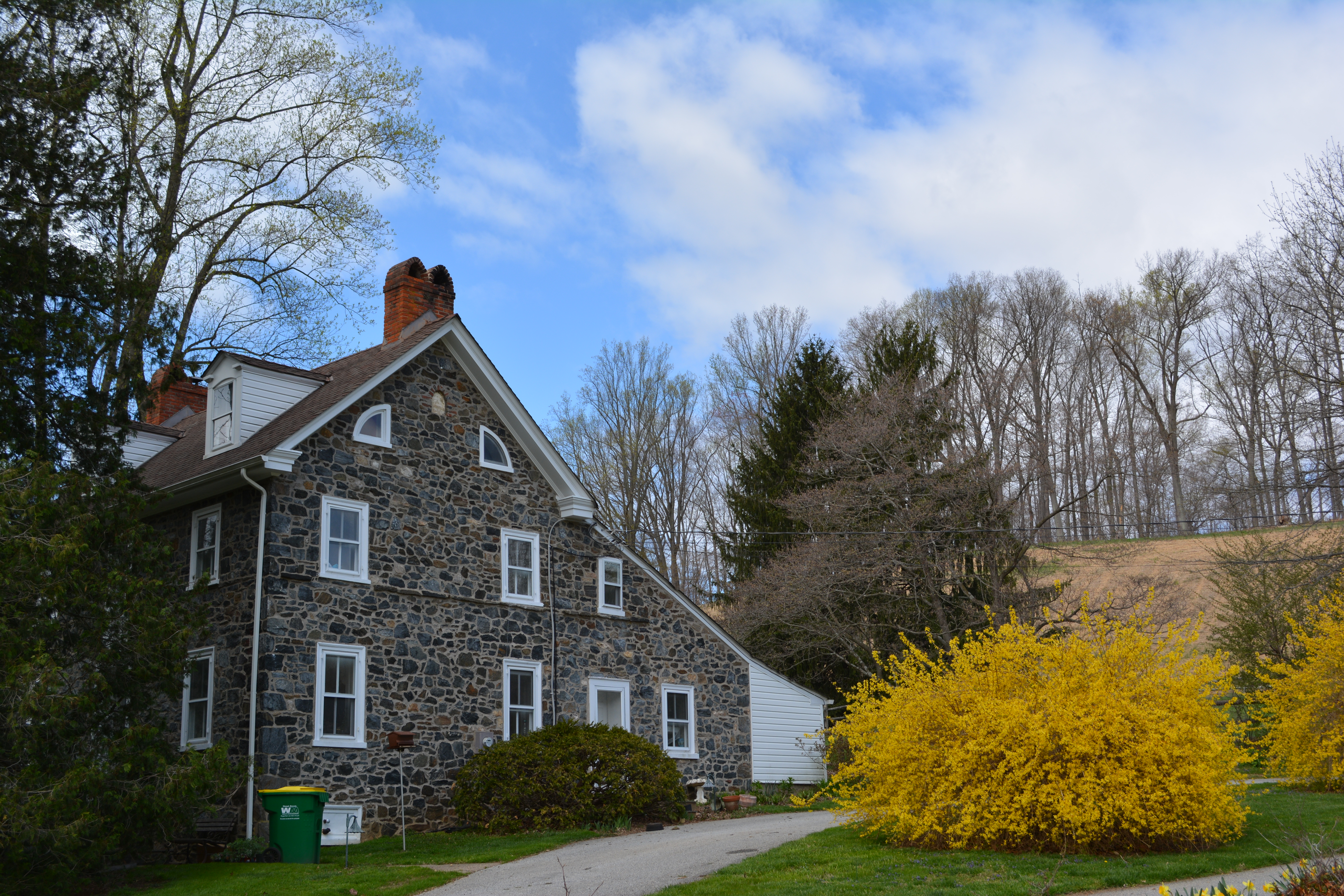

- Location within Delaware Location within the United States
- Location: SR 261 and DE 82, Mount Cuba, Delaware
- Coordinates: 39°47′22″N 75°38′26″W
- Area: 24 acres (9.7 ha)
- Built: 1816
- Architectural style: Gothic
- NRHP reference No.: 79000627
- Added to NRHP: December 19, 1979

Mount Cuba Historic District is a national historic district at Mount Cuba, New Castle County, Delaware, United States. It encompasses twelve contributing buildings, one contributing site, and four contributing structures on seven properties that lie along County Road 261.

Notable buildings include the Speakman's grist mill, saw mill, and adjoining stone house; and a number of frame dwellings in a variety of popular mid- to late 19th-century architectural styles including Gothic Revival. The contributing site is the Mt. Cuba picnic grounds.

It was added to the National Register of Historic Places in 1979.
