= Wilson Run (Brandywine Creek tributary) =

Stream in Delaware, USA

Wilson Run Tributary to Brandywine Creek
- Location of Wilson Run mouth

Location
- Country: United States
- State: Delaware
- County: New Castle

Physical characteristics
- Source: divide between Brandywine Creek and Red Clay Creek
  - location: about 0.5 miles south of Centerville, Delaware
  - coordinates: 39°49′01″N 075°37′13″W
  - elevation: 340 ft (100 m)
- Mouth: Brandywine Creek
  - location: Rockland, Delaware
  - coordinates: 39°47′48″N 075°34′31″W
  - elevation: 118 ft (36 m)
- Length: 2.26 mi (3.64 km)
- Basin size: 3.29 square miles (8.5 km^{2})
- Discharge
  - location: Brandywine Creek
  - average: 5.17 cu ft/s (0.146 m^{3}/s) at mouth with Brandywine Creek

Basin features
- Progression: southeast
- River system: Christina River
- Tributaries
  - left: unnamed tributaries
  - right: unnamed tributaries

Wilson Run is a 2.26 mi (3.64 km) long tributary to Brandywine Creek in New Castle County, Delaware. Wilson Run drains the Winterthur area of Delaware.

== See also ==
- List of Delaware rivers
