= Chestnut Run (Little Mill Creek tributary) =

Chestnut Run Tributary to Little Mill Creek
- Location within Delaware Location within the United States

Location
- Country: United States
- State: Delaware
- County: New Castle
- City: Elsmere

Physical characteristics
- Source: Brandywine Creek divide
  - location: Silverbrook, Delaware
  - coordinates: 39°45′34″N 075°35′59″W
  - elevation: 150 ft (46 m)
- Mouth: Little Mill Creek
  - location: Elsmere, Delaware
  - coordinates: 39°44′12″N 075°36′24″W
  - elevation: 75 ft (23 m)
- Length: 1.63 mi (2.62 km)
- Basin size: 1.22 square miles (3.2 km^{2})
- Discharge
  - average: 1.74 cu ft/s (0.049 m^{3}/s) at mouth with Little Mill Creek

Basin features
- Progression: southwest
- River system: Christina River
- Tributaries
  - left: unnamed tributaries
  - right: unnamed tributaries
- Bridges: DE 48; Oak Hill Drive; DE 34; Jefferson Avenue; DE 2 Forest Avenue

Chestnut Run is a 1.63 mi (2.62 km) long 2nd order tributary to Little Mill Creek in New Castle County, Delaware.

== Course ==
Chestnut Run rises on the Brandywine Creek divide at Silverside in New Castle County, Delaware. Chestnut Run then flows southwest to meet Little Mill Creek at Elsmere, Delaware.

== Watershed ==
Chestnut Run drains 1.22 square miles (3.2 km^{2}) of area, receives about 46.8 in/year of precipitation, has a topographic wetness index of 487.43 and is about 12.4% forested.

== See also ==
- List of rivers of Delaware
