= Delaware Route 9 =

State highway in Kent and New Castle counties in Delaware, United States

Delaware Route 9
- DE 9 highlighted in red, DE 9 Truck in blue

Route information
- Maintained by DelDOT and USACE
- Length: 57.83 mi (93.07 km)
- Existed: 1936–present
- Tourist routes: Delaware Bayshore Byway; Harriet Tubman Underground Railroad Byway; Washington–Rochambeau Revolutionary Route

Major junctions
- South end: DE 1 near Dover AFB
- DE 8 in Little Creek; DE 42 in Leipsic; DE 6 near Smyrna; DE 299 near Odessa; DE 72 near Delaware City; DE 141 / DE 273 in New Castle; I-295 / US 40 in Holloway Terrace; DE 9A near Port of Wilmington; US 13 in Wilmington; I-95 / US 202 in Wilmington
- North end: DE 2 in Wilmington

Location
- Country: United States
- State: Delaware
- Counties: Kent, New Castle

Highway system
- Delaware State Route System; List; Byways
← US 9	→ DE 9A

Delaware Route 9 (DE 9) is a 57.83-mile (93.07 km) state highway that runs from DE 1 near Dover Air Force Base in Kent County north to DE 2 in the city of Wilmington in New Castle County. DE 9 is a designated scenic highway known as the Delaware Bayshore Byway south of New Castle, running through mostly rural areas to the west of the Delaware Bay and the Delaware River as a two-lane undivided road. Between New Castle and Wilmington, DE 9 is a four-lane road that runs through urban and suburban areas. DE 9 passes through several cities and towns including Little Creek, Leipsic, Port Penn, Delaware City, and New Castle. DE 9 has an auxiliary route, DE 9A, that provides access to the Port of Wilmington. In addition, it has a truck route, DE 9 Truck, located to the south of New Castle.

DE 9 was first designated by 1936 to run from U.S. Route 113 (US 113, now DE 1) southeast of Dover north to US 13 in Smyrna, following its current alignment to Leipsic and Smyrna-Leipsic Road to Smyrna. In the 1950s, the route was extended north to US 13 Alt. (now US 13) in Wilmington, in which it was rerouted at Leipsic to follow its current alignment to Wilmington. DE 9 was extended further north to DE 2 by the 1970s. The route was rerouted to bypass downtown New Castle in the 1980s. The intersection with DE 1 was reconstructed into an interchange in 2009.

== Route description ==
=== Dover Air Force Base to Delaware City ===
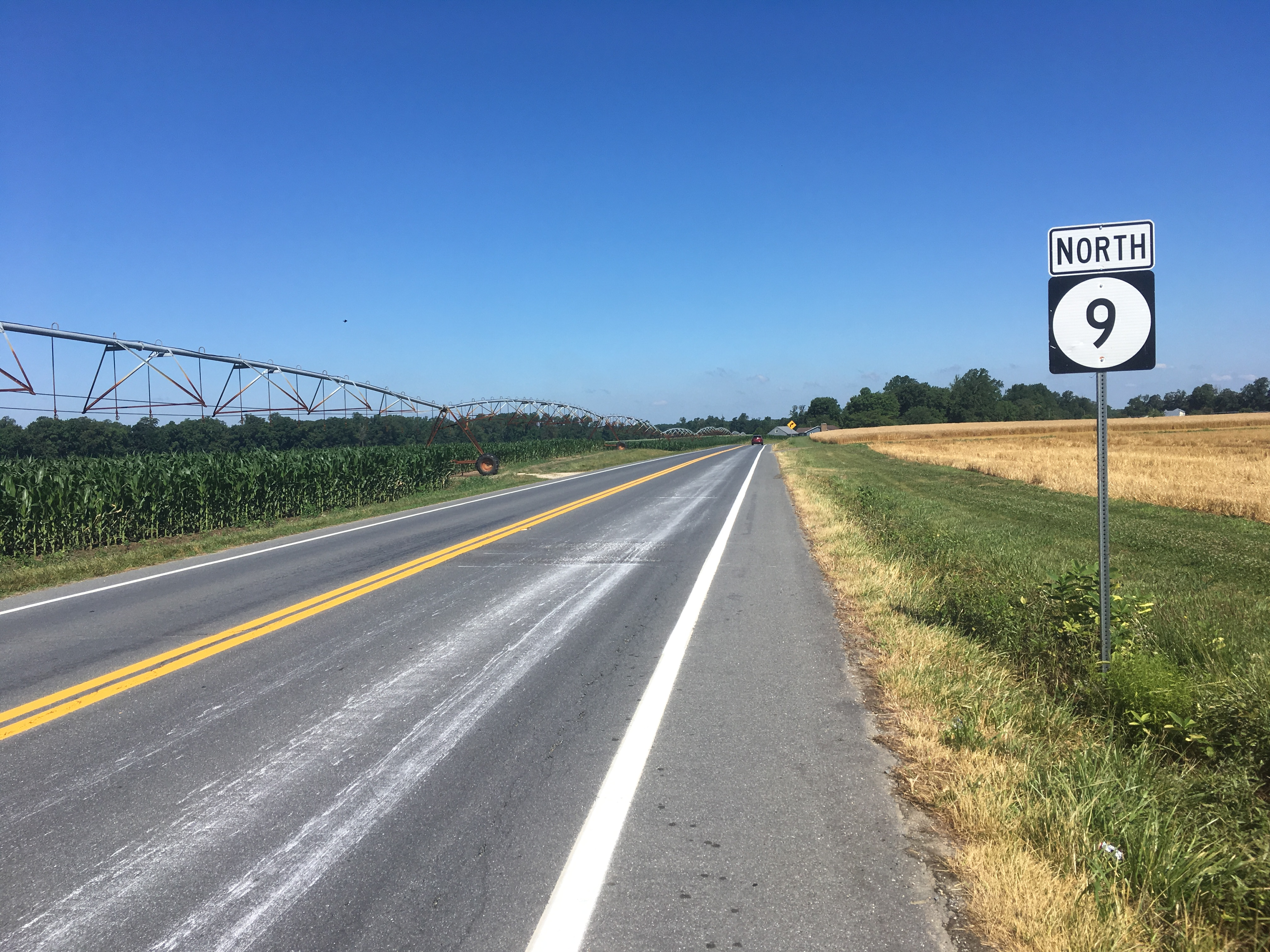
DE 9 northbound between Little Creek and Leipsic

DE 9 begins at a diamond interchange with DE 1 just south of the toll road terminus at the south end of Dover Air Force Base in the city of Dover in Kent County. Past DE 1, the route heads north-northeast on two-lane undivided Bayside Drive. DE 9 soon reaches an intersection with Kitts Hummock Road; this road leads east to the John Dickinson Plantation, which is part of First State National Historical Park, and the community of Kitts Hummock on the Delaware Bay. Following this, the route passes between the runways of Dover Air Force Base to the west and farm fields to the east, leaving the city limits of Dover. Along this stretch, Heritage Road leads west to the Air Mobility Command Museum on the base grounds. After the air base, the road continues north through a mix of farmland and woodland with some homes to the west of the Little Creek Wildlife Area.

DE 9 intersects South Little Creek Road before it crosses the marshy Little River and enters the town of Little Creek, where the name changes to Main Street and it is lined with residences. The route comes to a junction with the eastern terminus of DE 8 as it leaves Little Creek and becomes Bayside Drive again. The road continues northwest through farmland with some trees and homes, passing to the southwest of Octagonal Schoolhouse before heading through the community of Cowgills Corner, where it crosses White Oak Road/Savannah Road. Past this junction, the route runs southwest of Chandelle Estates Airport. DE 9 curves to the north at the Leipsic Road/Squawigm Road intersection and enters the town of Leipsic. At this point, the route turns northwest, with the name becoming Denny Street, and runs past homes and businesses, curving north to intersect the eastern terminus of DE 42.

DE 9 heads into marshland and crosses the Leipsic River on a high-level bridge, leaving Leipsic. Here, the road becomes Smyrna-Leipsic Road and enters agricultural areas with some woods and homes. Smyrna-Leipsic Road splits to the northwest and the route continues north on Hay Point Landing Road, running to the west of the Bombay Hook National Wildlife Refuge, where the Allee House is located. DE 9 comes to an intersection with DE 6 as it passes through the Woodland Beach Wildlife Area, turning to the northwest as it heads through a mix of woods and marshland. The road continues to a high-level bridge over the Smyrna River.

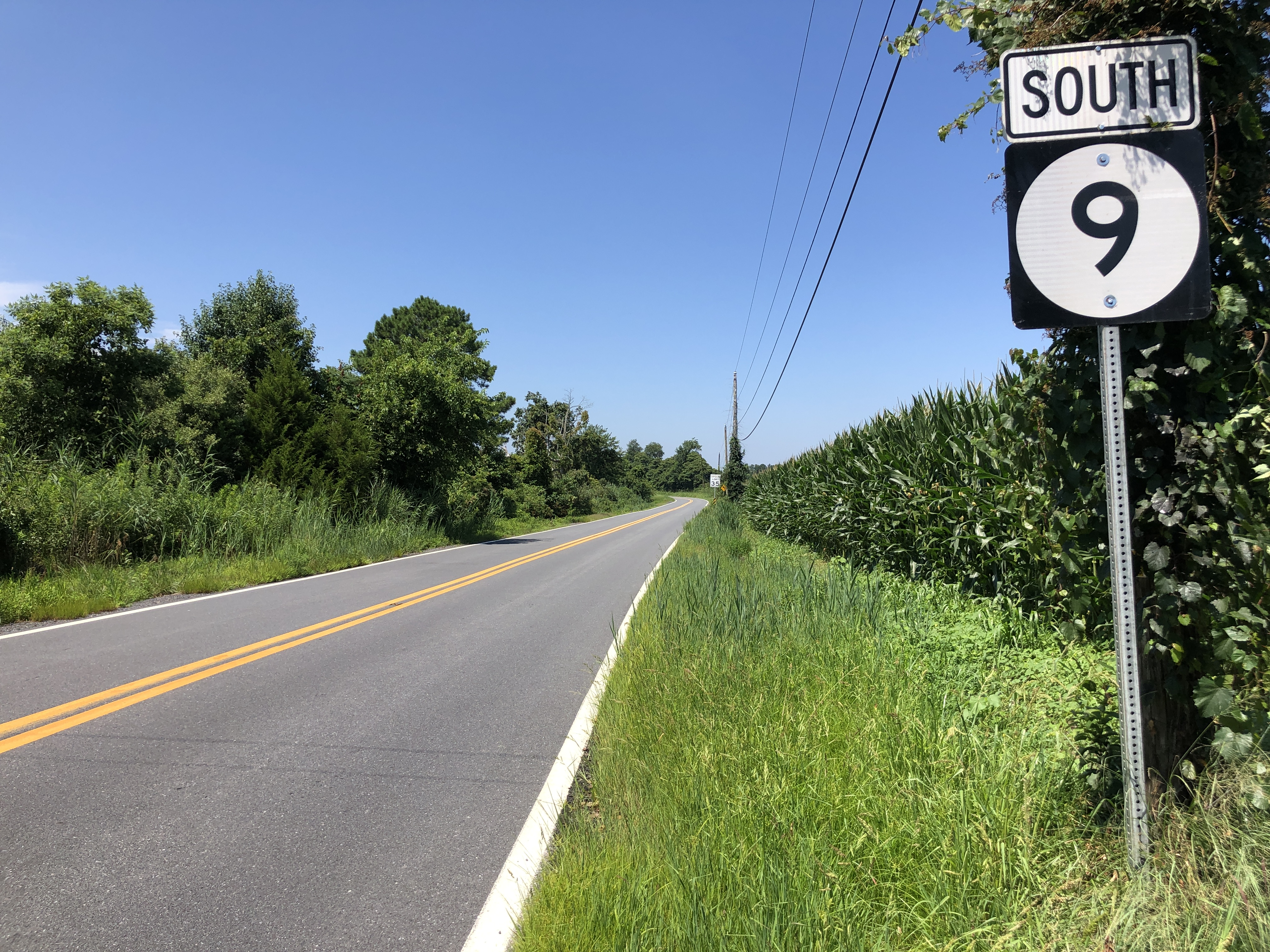
DE 9 southbound south of Port Penn

Upon crossing the Smyrna River, DE 9 enters New Castle County and becomes Flemings Landing Road, heading through the community of Flemings Landing and passing through agricultural areas with some woods to the west of the Cedar Swamp Wildlife Area. The road runs to the north before curving northwest again. The route turns west onto Taylors Bridge Road and crosses the marshy Blackbird Creek. DE 9 curves to the north-northwest and passes through more rural areas with some residential subdivisions to the west. The route heads to the northwest before turning northeast onto Thomas Landing Road in Mathews Corners, with DE 299 continuing northwest on Taylors Bridge Road towards the town of Odessa, where the Odessa Historic District is located.

DE 9 runs between farmland to the north and housing developments to the south prior to turning north onto Thomas Corner Road. At the Old Corbit Road intersection, the road curves northeast as Silver Run Road and runs through agricultural areas before entering marshland and crossing the Appoquinimink River. After this, the route turns north to remain on Silver Run Road and passes through areas of farms, woods, and wetlands in the Augustine Wildlife Area a short distance to the west of the Delaware River, coming to a bridge over Silver Run. DE 9 turns east onto Bayview Road before turning north onto St. Augustine Road and following the west bank of the Delaware River. The route crosses Augustine Creek and passes through the residential community of Augustine Beach. The road reaches the community of Port Penn, where it is lined with homes. In Port Penn, the route turns west onto Market Street before turning north onto Delaware City Port Penn Road near the Port Penn Interpretive Center.

Upon leaving Port Penn, DE 9 heads through marshland with some fields and woods within the Augustine Wildlife Area. The route rises onto the Reedy Point Bridge, a cantilever truss bridge which carries it over the Chesapeake & Delaware Canal. After heading over the canal, the road crosses over Fort DuPont State Park, curving northwest and passing to the southwest of Fort DuPont and the Governor Bacon Health Center. The route comes to a roundabout with Polktown Place and Old Elm Avenue after the bridge. DE 9 continues into the city of Delaware City and becomes 5th Street, crossing the Delaware City Channel on a bridge before intersecting the eastern terminus of the Michael N. Castle Trail. Past the bridge, the road heads through residential areas with some businesses and intersects Clinton Street, which leads northeast to the Forts Ferry Crossing that provides access to Fort Delaware on Pea Patch Island, part of Fort Delaware State Park.

=== Delaware City to Wilmington ===
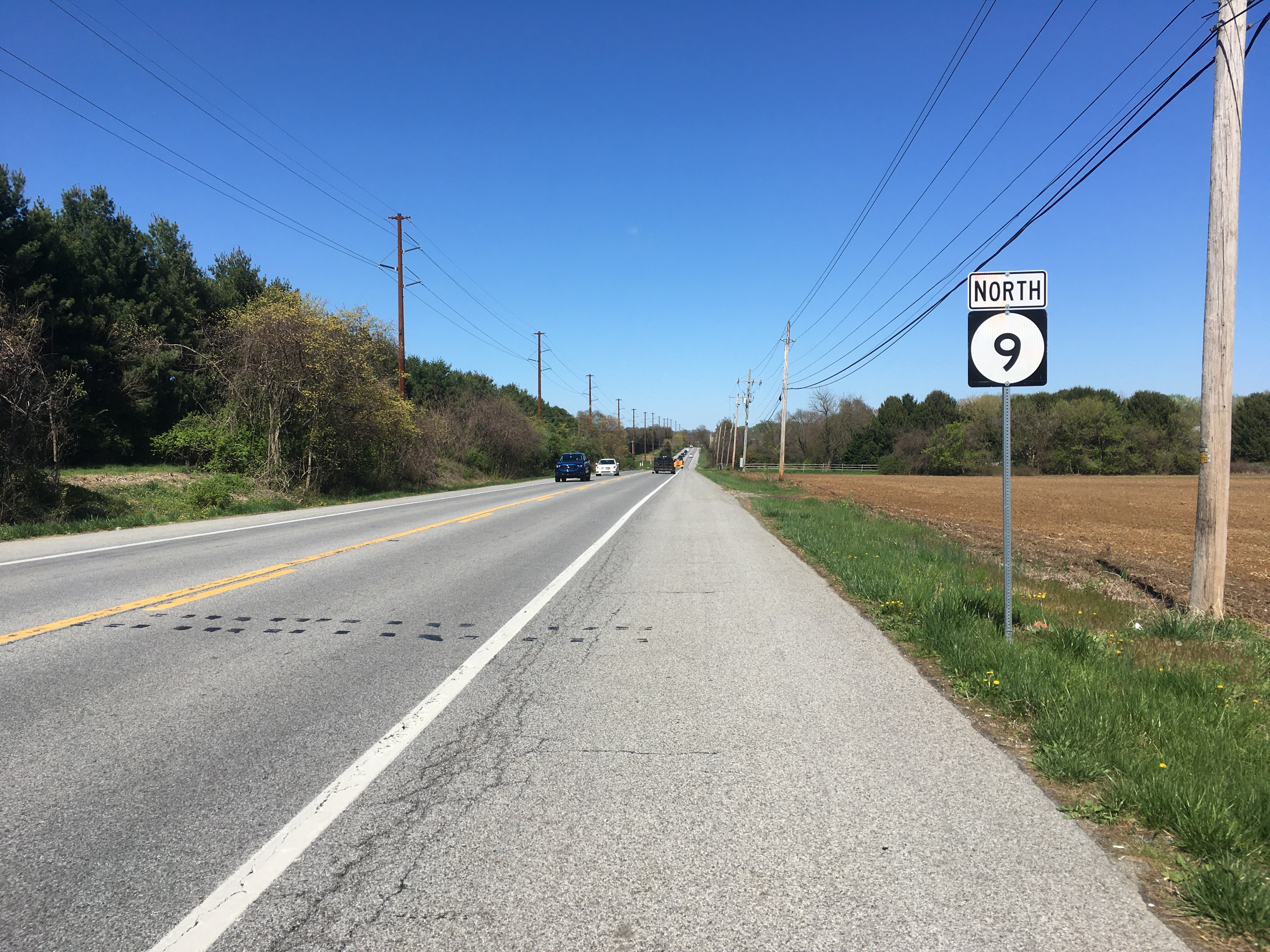
DE 9 northbound between Delaware City and New Castle

Upon leaving Delaware City, DE 9 continues west as Wrangle Hill Road, crossing Dragon Creek before passing between PBF Energy's Delaware City Refinery to the north and farm fields to the south. The route turns north onto River Road to head into the oil refinery complex, with DE 72 continuing west (north) on Wrangle Hill Road. Within the oil refinery, the road crosses Norfolk Southern's Reybold Industrial Track railroad line at-grade. DE 9 leaves the industrial area upon crossing marshy Red Lion Creek and continues into a mix of fields, woods, and marshland, with DE 9 Truck heading northwest on Hamburg Road. At this point, the route turns to the northeast and passes between Ommelanden Park to the west and the Ommelanden Hunter Training Center to the east before running between residential subdivisions to the west and the northern training grounds for the Delaware National Guard to the east. DE 9 passes through wooded areas with some homes before continuing into industrial areas and crossing a railroad spur. The road continues into marshland immediately to the northwest of the Delaware River, crossing Army Creek, before entering the city of New Castle.

At this point, DE 9 becomes West 7th Street and passes and industrial development. The route turns north-northwest onto Washington Street and crosses Norfolk Southern's New Castle Secondary railroad line at-grade, heading into residential areas. DE 9 comes to an intersection with the southern terminus of DE 141 and the eastern terminus of DE 273, at which point DE 9 Truck returns to the route by way of DE 273. Here, DE 9 turns east onto Delaware Street. The road carries one eastbound lane and two westbound lanes, with a multi-use trail parallel to the north. The route narrows back to two lanes and crosses the Jack A. Markell Trail, where the parallel multi-use trail ends, before it heads across the Norfolk Southern line again at-grade, at which point it turns east-northeast onto Ferry Cut Off Street near the New Castle Historic District. The historic district is home to the New Castle Court House Museum, New Castle Green, and the Sheriff's House, which are all part of First State National Historical Park. The road passes homes and businesses before intersecting East 6th Street.

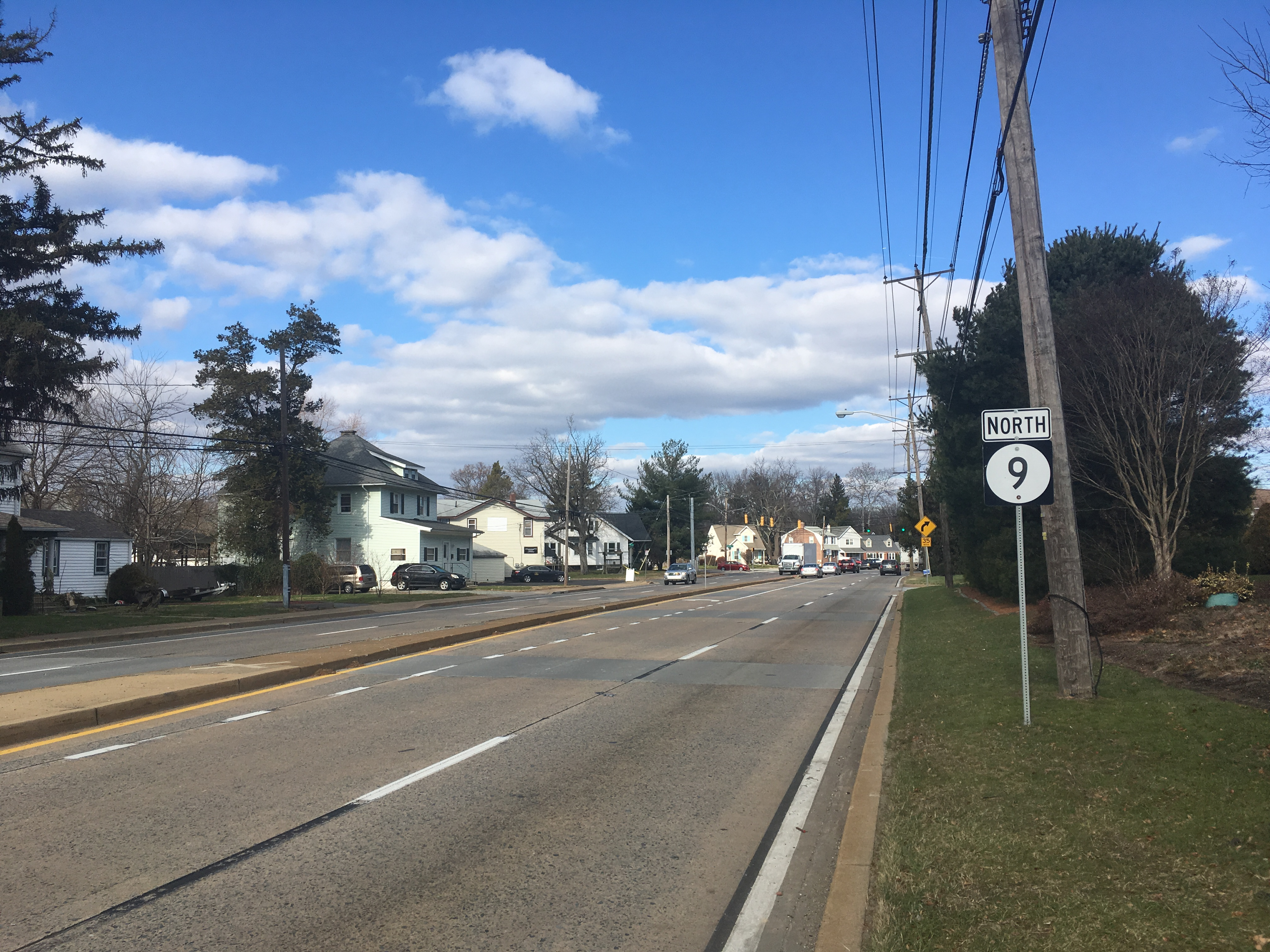
DE 9 northbound approaching Moores Lane in New Castle

Here, DE 9 turns northeast onto East 6th Street, crossing a marshy creek and widening into a four-lane divided highway. The route curves north and becomes Wilmington Road, passing through commercial areas. The road crosses the Norfolk Southern New Castle Secondary again at-grade and runs through suburban residential neighborhoods and businesses, leaving New Castle. DE 9 becomes New Castle Avenue and passes to the west of Veterans Memorial Park before it comes to a cloverleaf interchange with Interstate 295 (I-295)/US 40 a short distance to the west of the Delaware Memorial Bridge over the Delaware River. After the Rogers Road junction, DE 9 turns into a four-lane undivided road that continues through industrial and residential areas, crossing under I-495 without an interchange. The road briefly becomes a divided highway again and intersects the southern terminus of DE 9A, which heads east to provide access to I-495 and the Port of Wilmington.

After DE 9A, DE 9 enters the city of Wilmington and heads through urban areas as an undivided road, crossing Norfolk Southern's Shellpot Secondary at-grade before intersecting the northbound direction of US 13. At this point, DE 9 splits into a one-way pair with the northbound direction becoming concurrent with northbound US 13 on one-way New Castle Avenue and the southbound direction following southbound US 13 on South Heald Street, briefly turning east along with northbound US 13 on D Street at the south end of the one-way pair. The one-way pair, which carries two lanes in each direction, passes rowhouses and businesses, with New Castle Avenue merging onto South Heald Street. Here, US 13/DE 9 continue north-northeast on four-lane undivided South Heald Street, coming to an intersection with the northern terminus of DE 9A.

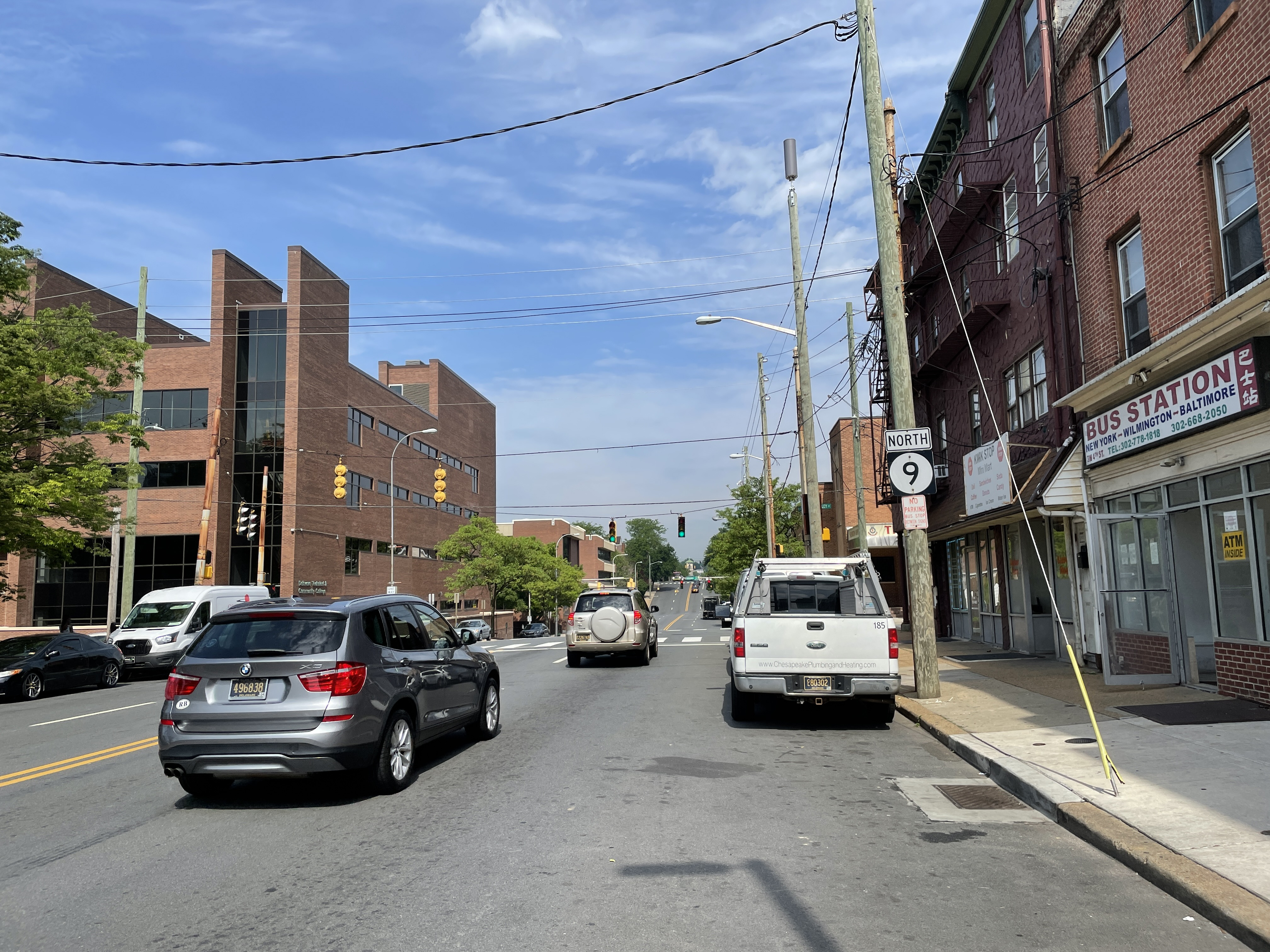
DE 9 northbound on West 4th Street past North Market Street in Wilmington

Following this, the road becomes East 4th Street and heads north-northwest across the Christina River on a drawbridge. US 13/DE 9 curves northwest and passes under Amtrak's Northeast Corridor railroad line, at which point northbound US 13 splits from the road by turning northeast on North Church Street at the grade crossing of a railroad spur. A block later, the concurrency between DE 9 and southbound US 13 ends at the point where southbound US 13 joins the road from North Spruce Street. DE 9 continues northwest through residential and commercial areas as a four-lane undivided road, entering downtown Wilmington. Here, it intersects US 13 Bus., which is routed on the one-way pair of North Walnut Street northbound and North King Street southbound. In between these two streets, the road runs to the south of the Leonard L. Williams Justice Center (the county courthouse for New Castle County).

Upon crossing North Market Street, the route becomes West 4th Street and passes to the north of the Orlando J. George, Jr. Campus of Delaware Technical Community College. DE 9 continues into residential areas and crosses under I-95/US 202, with access to that road provided by northbound North Adams Street and southbound North Jackson Street. Past this, the road heads through more of the city before reaching the Little Italy neighborhood. Here, DE 9 intersects the eastbound direction of DE 2 (North Lincoln Street) before coming to its northern terminus at the westbound direction of DE 2 (North Union Street).

Much of DE 9 is designated as part of the Delaware Byways system. From the southern terminus north to New Castle, DE 9 is designated as part of the Delaware Bayshore Byway, a byway that is noted for following the Delaware Bay and Delaware River shoreline. The byway continues south past the terminus of DE 9 toward Lewes. The Delaware Bayshore Byway is also a National Scenic Byway. The sections of the route between DE 299 east of Odessa and 7th Street southwest of New Castle, Wilmington Road north of New Castle and A Street in Wilmington, and along 4th Street in Wilmington between Swedes Landing Road and US 13 Bus. and Market and West streets are part of the Harriet Tubman Underground Railroad Byway. The section of DE 9 between US 13 Bus. and Van Buren Street in Wilmington is part of the Washington–Rochambeau Revolutionary Route, a National Historic Trail. DE 9 has an annual average daily traffic count ranging from a high of 20,160 vehicles at the intersection with the northern terminus of DE 9A to a low of 412 vehicles at the border between Kent and New Castle counties. The portion of DE 9 between DE 141/DE 273 and East 6th Street in New Castle is part of the National Highway System.

== History ==
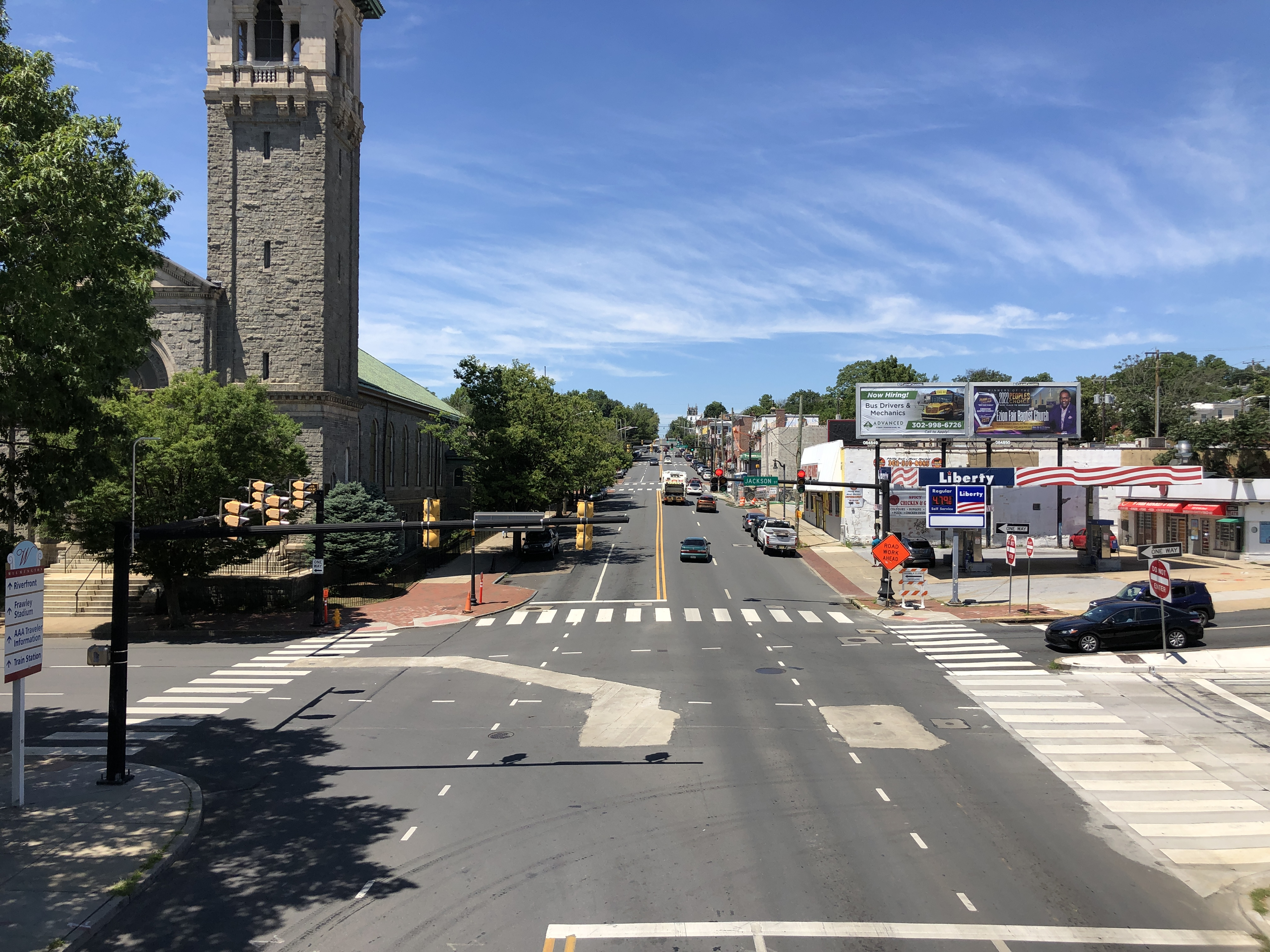
DE 9 northbound in Wilmington

The section of the present route between New Castle and Wilmington was constructed as the New Castle and Wilmington Turnpike, a private turnpike, in 1813. What would become DE 9 originally existed as a county road by 1920. Four years later, the road between Leipsic and Smyrna was upgraded to a state highway. In addition, the current alignment of DE 9 around Taylors Bridge and between Delaware City and Wilmington was paved. In 1931, what would become DE 9 was upgraded to a state highway between Bay Road and Little Creek and between Port Penn and Delaware City. A year later, the road became a state highway between Delaware City and Wilmington. By this time, what would become DE 9 between Little Creek and Leipsic was upgraded to a state highway. A drawbridge was constructed over the Delaware City Channel in 1933. This drawbridge was sealed and rendered inoperable in 1971.

DE 9 was designated to run from US 113 (now DE 1) west of Kitts Hummock north to US 13 in Smyrna by 1936, following its current alignment to Leipsic and Smyrna-Leipsic Road to Smyrna. By 1942, what is now DE 9 between the Taylors Bridge area and Port Penn was paved. In 1956, New Castle Avenue was widened to a four-lane divided highway between Landers Lane and Rogers Corner.

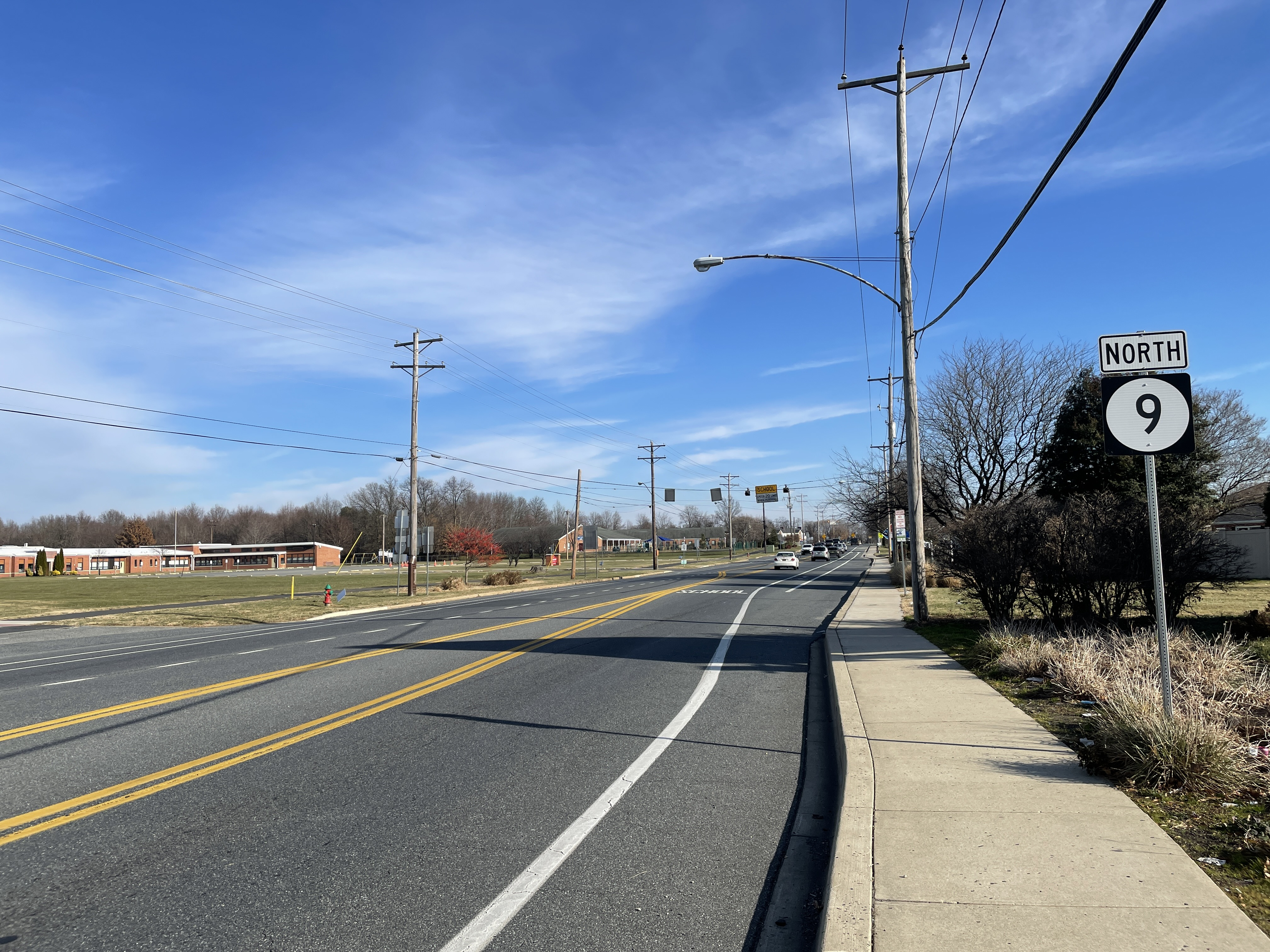
DE 9 northbound past DE 141 and DE 273 in New Castle

DE 9 was extended north to US 13 Alt. (now US 13) in Wilmington by 1959, being rerouted off Smyrna-Leipsic Road to follow its current alignment to New Castle, passing through that city on 6th Street before continuing along its current alignment to Wilmington. At this point, the entire route was paved. The current Reedy Point Bridge carrying DE 9 over the Chesapeake and Delaware Canal was completed in 1968. By 1971, DE 9 was extended north to its current terminus at DE 2. DE 9 was realigned to bypass New Castle by 1984 by following Washington Street and DE 273. On October 27, 2008, construction began to convert the intersection at the southern terminus with DE 1 into an interchange, with Governor Ruth Ann Minner in attendance at the groundbreaking ceremony. Construction of the interchange at DE 1 was completed in 2009. By 2015, DE 273 was formally removed from the concurrency with DE 9; however as of 2018, DE 273 signage remains along this segment.

On September 6, 2016, the U.S. Army Corps of Engineers began construction to demolish and replace the drawbridge carrying DE 9 over the Delaware City Channel with a fixed-span bridge. Construction of the bridge was expected to be complete in February 2017, but was delayed by winter weather. The new bridge opened to traffic on April 28, 2017. From January 6, 2023, to March 20, 2023, a roundabout was constructed at the entrance to Fort DuPont north of the Reedy Point Bridge.

The Delaware State Highway Department recommended that DE 9 along the Delaware Bay and Delaware River be designated a scenic highway as far back as 1965. In 2007, the Route 9 Coastal Heritage Byway (now Delaware Bayshore Byway) was nominated and designated as a Delaware Scenic and Historic Highway. The Delaware Bayshore Byway was designated as a National Scenic Byway in 2021.

== Major intersections ==
County	Location	mi	km	Destinations	Notes
Kent	Dover AFB	0.00	0.00	DE 1 (Bay Road) – Dover, Milford	DE 1 exit 91; southern terminus
Kent	Little Creek	5.05	8.13	DE 8 west (North Little Creek Road) – Dover	Eastern terminus of DE 8
Kent	Leipsic	11.49	18.49	DE 42 west (Fast Landing Road) to US 13 – Cheswold	Eastern terminus of DE 42
Kent		16.27	26.18	DE 6 (Woodland Beach Road) – Smyrna, Woodland Beach	
New Castle	Mathews Corners	29.15	46.91	DE 299 west (Taylors Bridge Road) – Odessa	Eastern terminus of DE 299
New Castle	Chesapeake & Delaware Canal			Reedy Point Bridge	
New Castle	Delaware City	42.62	68.59	DE 72 north (Wrangle Hill Road) to US 13 / DE 1 – Newark	Southern terminus of DE 72
New Castle		45.08	72.55	DE 9 Truck north (Hamburg Road) to US 13	Southern terminus of DE 9 Truck
New Castle	New Castle	50.07	80.58	DE 141 north (Basin Road) to I-95 DE 273 west / DE 9 Truck south (Frenchtown Road)	Southern terminus of DE 141; eastern terminus of DE 273; northern terminus of DE 9 Truck
New Castle	Holloway Terrace	52.93	85.18	I-295 north (US 40 east) to N.J. Turnpike – Delaware Memorial Bridge, New Jersey, New York I-295 south (US 40 west) to I-95 / I-495 – Baltimore	Interchange
New Castle	Wilmington			DE 9A north (Terminal Avenue) to I-495	Southern terminus of DE 9A
New Castle	Wilmington	55.49	89.30	US 13 south (South Heald Street) – Dover	South end of US 13 overlap
New Castle	Wilmington	55.69	89.62	DE 9A south (Christina Avenue)	Northern terminus of DE 9A
New Castle	Wilmington	55.99	90.11	US 13 north (North Church Street)	North end of US 13 northbound overlap
New Castle	Wilmington	56.07	90.24	US 13 south (North Spruce Street)	North end of US 13 southbound overlap
New Castle	Wilmington	56.35	90.69	US 13 Bus. north (North Walnut Street)	
New Castle	Wilmington	56.46	90.86	US 13 Bus. south (North King Street) to I-95 – Transit Center	
New Castle	Wilmington			I-95 (US 202 / Wilmington Expressway) – Delaware Memorial Bridge, Baltimore, Chester, Philadelphia	I-95/US 202 exit 6
New Castle	Wilmington			DE 2 east (North Lincoln Street)	
New Castle	Wilmington	57.83	93.07	DE 2 west (North Union Street) to DE 48	Northern terminus
1.000 mi = 1.609 km; 1.000 km = 0.621 mi: Concurrency terminus

== Special routes ==
=== DE 9A ===
Delaware Route 9A
- Location: Wilmington
- Length: 0.78 mi (1,260 m)
- Existed: 1971–present

Delaware Route 9A (DE 9A) is a two- to four-lane road in Wilmington, Delaware that serves as the primary access route to the Port of Wilmington as well as provide access to I-495. The official designation of the route runs 0.78 miles (1.26 km) along Terminal Avenue between DE 9 and the Port of Wilmington, interchanging with I-495. Signage has the route continuing north along Christina Avenue to an intersection with US 13 and DE 9 for a total length of 2.0 mi (3.2 km). Christina Avenue originally became a state highway by 1924, serving as part of US 40 that connected to a ferry across the Delaware River to Penns Grove, New Jersey, in 1926. US 40 was removed from this road by 1931 and it later became part of DE 48 by 1936. DE 48 was subsequently removed by 1952 following the discontinuance of the ferry in 1949. DE 9A was designated by 1971.

=== DE 9 Truck ===
Delaware Route 9 Truck
- Location: Tybouts Corner–New Castle
- Length: 5.7 mi (9.2 km)

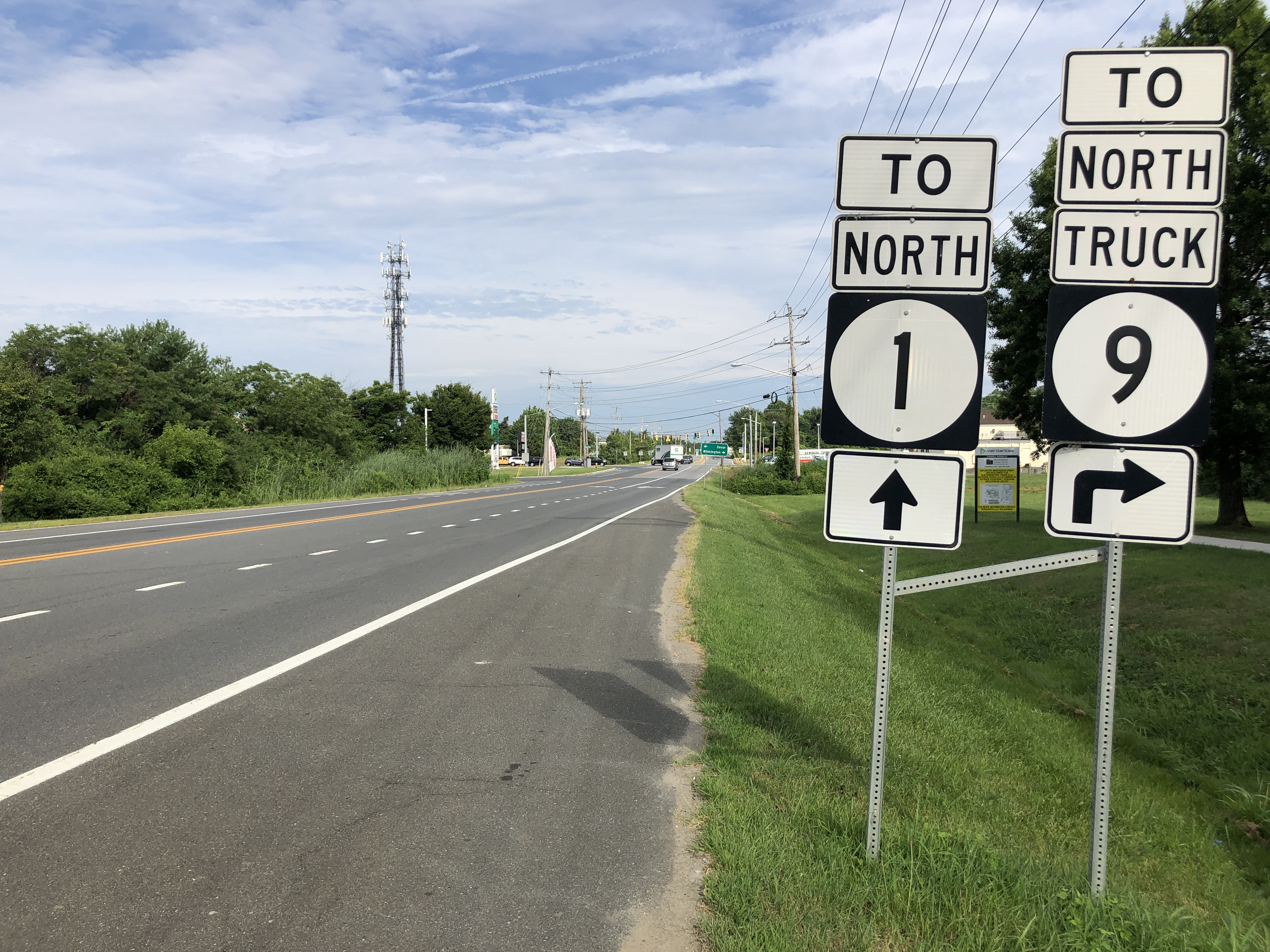
DE 9 Truck northbound approaching US 13 in Tybouts Corner

Delaware Route 9 Truck (DE 9 Truck) is a truck bypass of a stretch of DE 9 south of New Castle. It heads northwest from DE 9 on two-lane undivided Hamburg Road, passing through farmland with some development. In Tybouts Corner, the truck route turns northeast to join US 13 on four-lane divided South Dupont Highway. The road passes through farmland with some residential and commercial development. Farther north, the road heads into business areas, passing under Norfolk Southern's New Castle Secondary railroad line before intersecting US 40 in State Road. At this point, US 40 joins US 13 and DE 9 Truck, with the road widening to eight lanes. In Hares Corner, DE 9 Truck turns east to follow DE 273 on two-lane undivided Frenchtown Road, entering New Castle and heading east between business parks to the south and farm fields to the north. DE 9 Truck ends along with DE 273 at an intersection with DE 9 and the southern terminus of DE 141 west of the center of New Castle.

Major intersections
The entire route is in New Castle County.

Location	mi	km	Destinations	Notes
	0.0	0.0	DE 9 (River Road)	Southern terminus
Tybouts Corner	0.6	0.97	US 13 south (South Dupont Highway) – Dover	South end of US 13 overlap
State Road	3.3	5.3	US 40 west (Pulaski Highway) – Glasgow, Baltimore	No access from northbound US 13/DE 9 Truck to westbound US 40; south end of US 40 overlap
Hares Corner	4.4	7.1	US 13 north / US 40 east (North Dupont Highway) – Wilmington DE 273 west – Christiana, Newark	North end of US 13/US 40 overlap; south end of DE 273 overlap
New Castle	5.7	9.2	DE 9 (Washington Street/Delaware Street) DE 141 north (Basin Road) DE 273 ends	Northern terminus; southern terminus of DE 141; eastern terminus of DE 273
1.000 mi = 1.609 km; 1.000 km = 0.621 mi: Concurrency terminus
