= Delaware Route 6 =

Highway in Delaware, United States

Delaware Route 6

Route information
- Maintained by DelDOT
- Length: 17.38 mi (27.97 km)
- Existed: 1936–present
- Tourist routes: Harriet Tubman Underground Railroad Byway

Major junctions
- West end: MD 291 near Blackiston
- DE 42 in Blackiston; DE 15 near Clayton; DE 300 in Smyrna; US 13 in Smyrna; DE 9 near Smyrna
- East end: Delaware Avenue in Woodland Beach

Location
- Country: United States
- State: Delaware
- Counties: Kent

Highway system
- Delaware State Route System; List; Byways
← DE 5	→ DE 7

Delaware Route 6 (DE 6) is a state highway in Kent County, Delaware. It runs from Maryland Route 291 (MD 291) at the Maryland border west of Blackiston east to the Delaware Bay in Woodland Beach. The route passes through rural areas of northern Kent County as well as the towns of Clayton and Smyrna. DE 6 intersects DE 42 in Blackiston, DE 15 in Clayton, DE 300 and U.S. Route 13 (US 13) in Smyrna, and DE 9 to the east of Smyrna. The road was built as a state highway during the 1920s and 1930s and received the DE 6 designation by 1936. The easternmost part of the route was paved in the 1960s and the route was moved to its current alignment bypassing downtown Smyrna by the 1990s.

== Route description ==
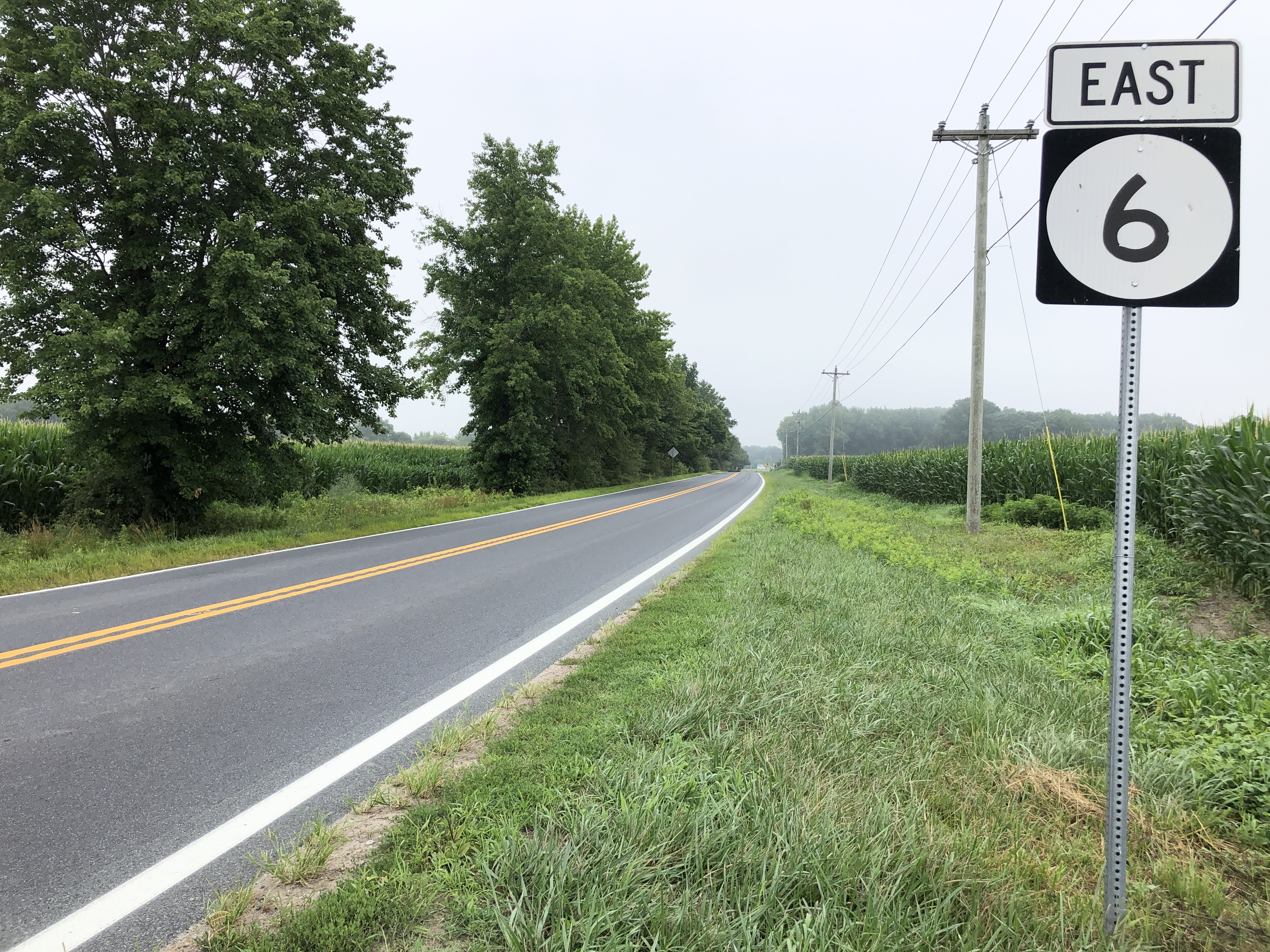
DE 6 eastbound west of Blackiston

DE 6 begins at the Maryland border, where the road continues west into that state as MD 291. From the state line, the route heads east on two-lane undivided Millington Road, passing through the Blackiston Wildlife Area. The road runs through areas of woods and farms with some homes. In the community of Blackiston, DE 6 intersects the western terminus of DE 42, which heads southeast toward the town of Kenton, and Longridge Road. The route continues east through more agricultural areas and reaches a junction with DE 15, at which point residential development near the road increases. DE 15 turns east to form a concurrency with DE 6. Upon reaching the western edge of the town of Clayton, DE 15 splits from DE 6 by heading to the north.

DE 6 proceeds northeast through Clayton on Main Street, where it passes homes along with a few businesses. In Clayton, the road crosses the Delmarva Central Railroad's Delmarva Subdivision line at-grade north of the former Clayton Railroad Station as it turns more to the east. The route continues into the town of Smyrna, where it becomes Smyrna Clayton Boulevard. Shortly after entering Smyrna, DE 6 crosses Greens Branch and intersects DE 300, where it turns northeast onto West Glenwood Avenue and forms a concurrency with DE 300. The two routes pass a mix of homes and businesses before gaining a center left-turn lane past the Main Street junction and entering a commercial area in the northern part of Smyrna as East Glenwood Avenue. Here, the road widens into a divided highway before intersecting US 13. At this point, DE 300 ends and DE 6 turns southeast to form a concurrency with US 13. The two routes pass more businesses on four-lane divided North Dupont Boulevard. DE 6 splits from US 13 by heading to the east on two-lane undivided East Commerce Street, running through residential areas. The route passes over the DE 1 toll road without an interchange and leaves Smyrna.

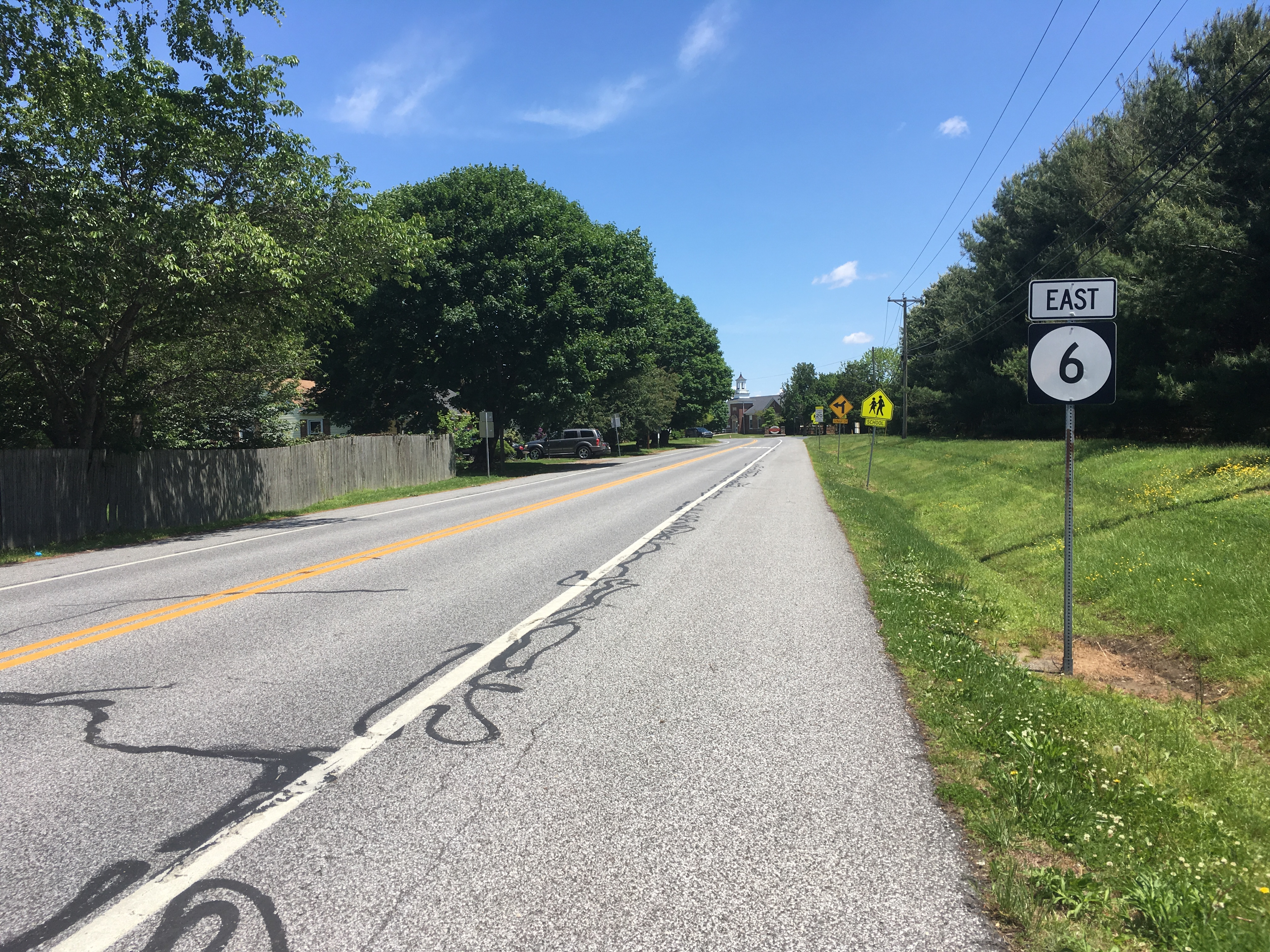
DE 6 eastbound past DE 15 in Clayton

Upon leaving Smyrna, DE 6 becomes Woodland Beach Road and passes to the north of Smyrna Airport. The road heads east into agricultural areas, crossing Mill Creek as it winds east. The route intersects DE 9 before curving northeast into marshland within the Woodland Beach Wildlife Area. DE 6 turns north and reaches its eastern terminus at an intersection with Delaware Avenue in the community of Woodland Beach, located along the Delaware Bay. Past the eastern terminus, the road continues as Beach Avenue for one block to a parking lot adjacent to the Delaware Bay.

The portion of the route between Alley Mill Road west of Clayton and DE 300 in Smyrna is part of the Harriet Tubman Underground Railroad Byway, a Delaware Byway. DE 6 has an annual average daily traffic count ranging from a high of 26,210 vehicles at the east end of the US 13 concurrency to a low of 525 vehicles at the Delaware Avenue intersection in Woodland Beach.

== History ==
By 1920, what is now DE 6 existed as an unimproved county road. The road was completed as a state highway within Clayton and was proposed as one from Clayton west to Blackiston by 1924. On August 5, 1925, the state highway between Clayton and Blackiston was completed. In 1929, the road leading to Woodland Beach was completed as a state highway. The portion of the road between Blackiston and the Maryland border was upgraded to a state highway in 1930. When Delaware created its state highway system by 1936, DE 6 was routed between the Maryland border west of Blackiston and Woodland Beach, following its current alignment to Smyrna, passing through Smyrna on Commerce Street, and continuing east on its current alignment to Woodland Beach. All of the route was paved except for the portion between present-day DE 9 and Woodland Beach. The eastern portion of the road was paved by 1967. By the 1990s, DE 6 was routed onto its current alignment through Smyrna along DE 300 and US 13, bypassing the downtown area.

== Major intersections ==
The entire route is in Kent County.

Location	mi	km	Destinations	Notes
Blackiston	0.00	0.00	MD 291 west (Cypress Road) – Millington	Maryland state line; western terminus
Blackiston	3.15	5.07	DE 42 east (Blackiston Road) – Kenton	Western terminus of DE 42
Clayton	5.83	9.38	DE 15 south (Alley Corner Road)	West end of DE 15 overlap
Clayton	7.12	11.46	DE 15 north (Duck Creek Road)	East end of DE 15 overlap
Smyrna	7.94	12.78	DE 300 west (Wheatleys Pond Road) – Kenton	West end of DE 300 overlap
Smyrna	9.04	14.55	US 13 north (North Dupont Boulevard) – Wilmington DE 300 ends	Eastern terminus of DE 300; west end of US 13 overlap
Smyrna	9.33	15.02	US 13 south (South Dupont Boulevard) – Dover	East end of US 13 overlap
			DE 9 (Hay Point Landing Road) – Flemings Landing, Leipsic	
Woodland Beach	17.38	27.97	Delaware Avenue	Eastern terminus
1.000 mi = 1.609 km; 1.000 km = 0.621 mi: Concurrency terminus
