= Delaware Route 9A =

Highway in Delaware, United States

Delaware Route 9A

Route information
- Maintained by DelDOT
- Length: 0.74 mi (1,190 m) Official length, signed length is 2.0 miles (3.2 km).
- Existed: 1971–present

Major junctions
- South end: DE 9 in Wilmington
- I-495 near Port of Wilmington
- North end: US 13 / DE 9 in Wilmington

Location
- Country: United States
- State: Delaware
- Counties: New Castle

Highway system
- Delaware State Route System; List; Byways
← DE 9	→ DE 10

Delaware Route 9A (DE 9A) is a two- to four-lane road in Wilmington, Delaware, United States, that serves as the primary access route to the Port of Wilmington as well as provides access to Interstate 495 (I-495). The official designation of the route runs 0.78 miles (1.26 km) along Terminal Avenue between DE 9 and the Port of Wilmington, interchanging with I-495. Signage has the route continuing north along Christina Avenue to an intersection with U.S. Route 13 (US 13) and DE 9 for a total length of 2.0 mi (3.2 km). Christina Avenue originally became a state highway in the 1920s, serving as part of US 40 that connected to a ferry across the Delaware River to Penns Grove, New Jersey. US 40 was removed from this road in the 1930s and later became part of DE 48. It was subsequently removed in the 1950s following the discontinuance of the ferry. DE 9A was designated by 1971.

== Route description ==
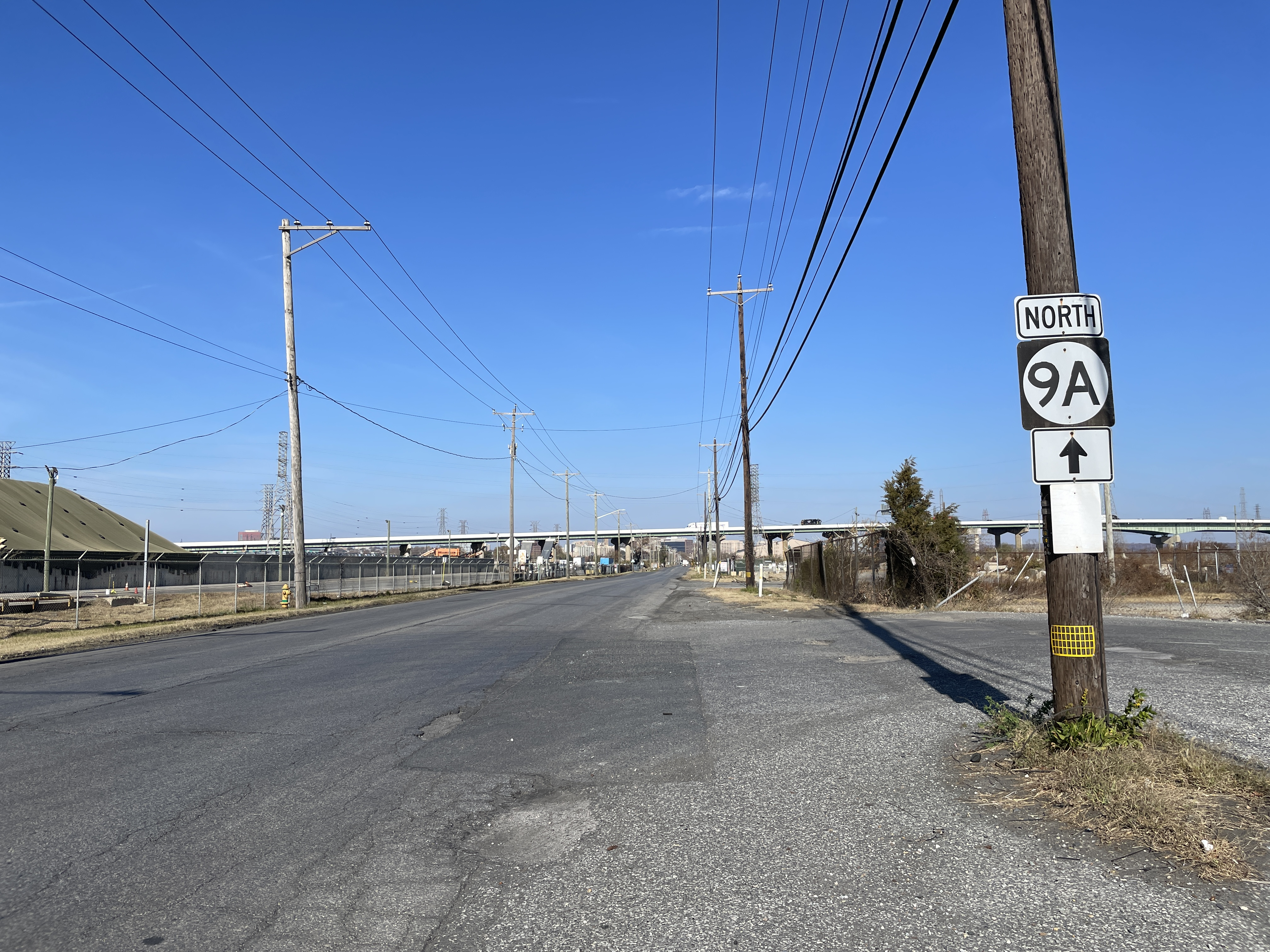
DE 9A northbound on Christina Avenue near the Port of Wilmington

DE 9A begins at an intersection with DE 9 in the city of Wilmington, heading east-southeast as two-lane undivided Terminal Avenue through residential areas. The road widens into a four-lane divided highway and comes to an interchange with I-495. Past I-495, the road heads through industrial areas, becoming an undivided road as it crosses over Norfolk Southern's New Castle Secondary railroad line at a grade crossing. The road crosses Norfolk Southern's Christiana Avenue Industrial Track before reaching the entrance to the Port of Wilmington at the Christina Avenue intersection. At this point, DelDOT officially marks the end of DE 9A, but signage shows it turning north onto Christina Avenue.

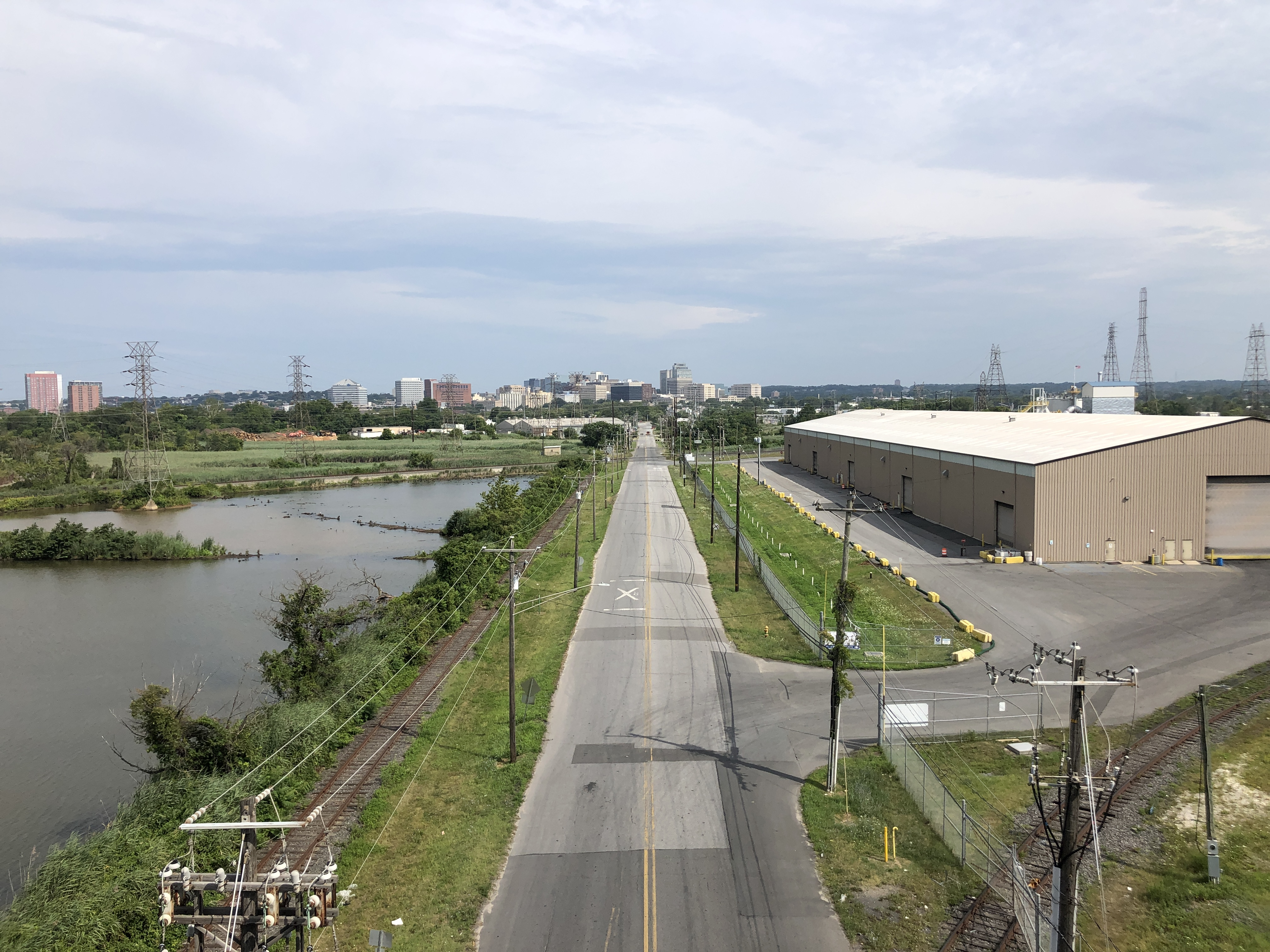
DE 9A northbound heading toward downtown Wilmington, viewed from I-495

DE 9A proceeds north-northwest as a two-lane road, passing through more industrial areas and crossing under I-495 again, this time underneath the I-495 bridge over the Christina River. After this, the route has a grade crossing with a Norfolk Southern railroad spur before it crosses over Norfolk Southern's New Castle Secondary and Shellpot Secondary at grade crossings in marshland. The road continues between residential and commercial areas to the west and industrial areas to the east before terminating at both US 13 and DE 9 near the Christina River drawbridge leading into Wilmington's central business district.

DE 9A has an annual average daily traffic count of 8,151 vehicles along Terminal Avenue. The portion of DE 9A along Terminal Avenue between I-495 and the entrance to the Port of Wilmington at Christina Avenue is part of the National Highway System.

== History ==
What is now DE 9A was a county road by 1920. By 1924, the Christina Avenue portion of the route was constructed as a state highway. Christina Avenue became a portion of US 40 in 1926, running from US 13 to a ferry that went across the Delaware River to Penns Grove, New Jersey. By 1931, US 40 was removed from this road. The road became the easternmost portion of DE 48 by 1936, which connected to a ferry that linked the route to New Jersey Route 48 in Penns Grove. DE 48 was removed from this road by 1952 after the ferry between Wilmington and Penns Grove was discontinued in 1949. DE 9A was designated around 1971 onto its current alignment.

== Major intersections ==
The entire route is in Wilmington, New Castle County.

mi	km	Destinations	Notes
0.00	0.00	DE 9 (New Castle Avenue)	Southern terminus
		I-495 – Philadelphia, Baltimore	I-495 exit 2
0.74	1.19	Christina Avenue	Official northern terminus; DE 9A signage continues north on Christina Avenue
2.0	3.2	US 13 / DE 9 (South Heald Street/East 4th Street) to I-495	Signed northern terminus
1.000 mi = 1.609 km; 1.000 km = 0.621 mi
