= Woodland Beach =

Woodland Beach may refer to:

- Woodland Beach, Delaware
- Woodland Beach, Maryland
- Woodland Beach, Michigan
- Woodland Beach Wildlife Area, located in Kent County, Delaware
