= Holloway Terrace, Delaware =

Unincorporated community in Delaware, United States

- Unincorporated community
- Location within Delaware Location within the United States
- Coordinates: 39°42′06″N 75°32′47″W
- Country: United States
- State: Delaware
- County: New Castle
- Elevation: 39 ft (12 m)
- Time zone: UTC-5 (Eastern (EST))
  - Summer (DST): UTC-4 (EDT)
- Area code: 302
- GNIS feature ID: 214105

Holloway Terrace is an unincorporated community in New Castle County, Delaware, United States. Holloway Terrace is located on the outskirts of the city of Wilmington along Delaware Route 9 and Interstate 295, southwest of the Port of Wilmington.

== History ==
Lots in the community, an early suburb of Wilmington, were first sold in May 1916. The Wilmington Evening Journal reported that 300 plots of land had sold on the first day; these sales included subscriptions to the Evening Journal.

Holloway Terrace was adjacent to the New Castle Trolley Line.

The residents formed the Holloway Terrace Civic Association and Volunteer Fire Company No. 1 on September 20, 1921, to provide representation and protection for the community.

By 1966, Holloway Terrace had a population of 1,100.
