= Augustine Beach, Delaware =

Unincorporated community in Delaware, United States

- Unincorporated community
- Location within Delaware Location within the United States
- Coordinates: 39°30′25″N 75°34′40″W
- Country: United States
- State: Delaware
- County: New Castle
- Elevation: 3 ft (0.91 m)
- Time zone: UTC-5 (Eastern (EST))
  - Summer (DST): UTC-4 (EDT)
- Area code: 302
- GNIS feature ID: 213581

Augustine Beach is an unincorporated community in New Castle County, Delaware, United States. Augustine Beach is located on the west bank of the Delaware River along Delaware Route 9, northeast of Odessa.
