= Lobdell Estate, Minquadale Home =

Historic house in Delaware, United States

- U.S. National Register of Historic Places
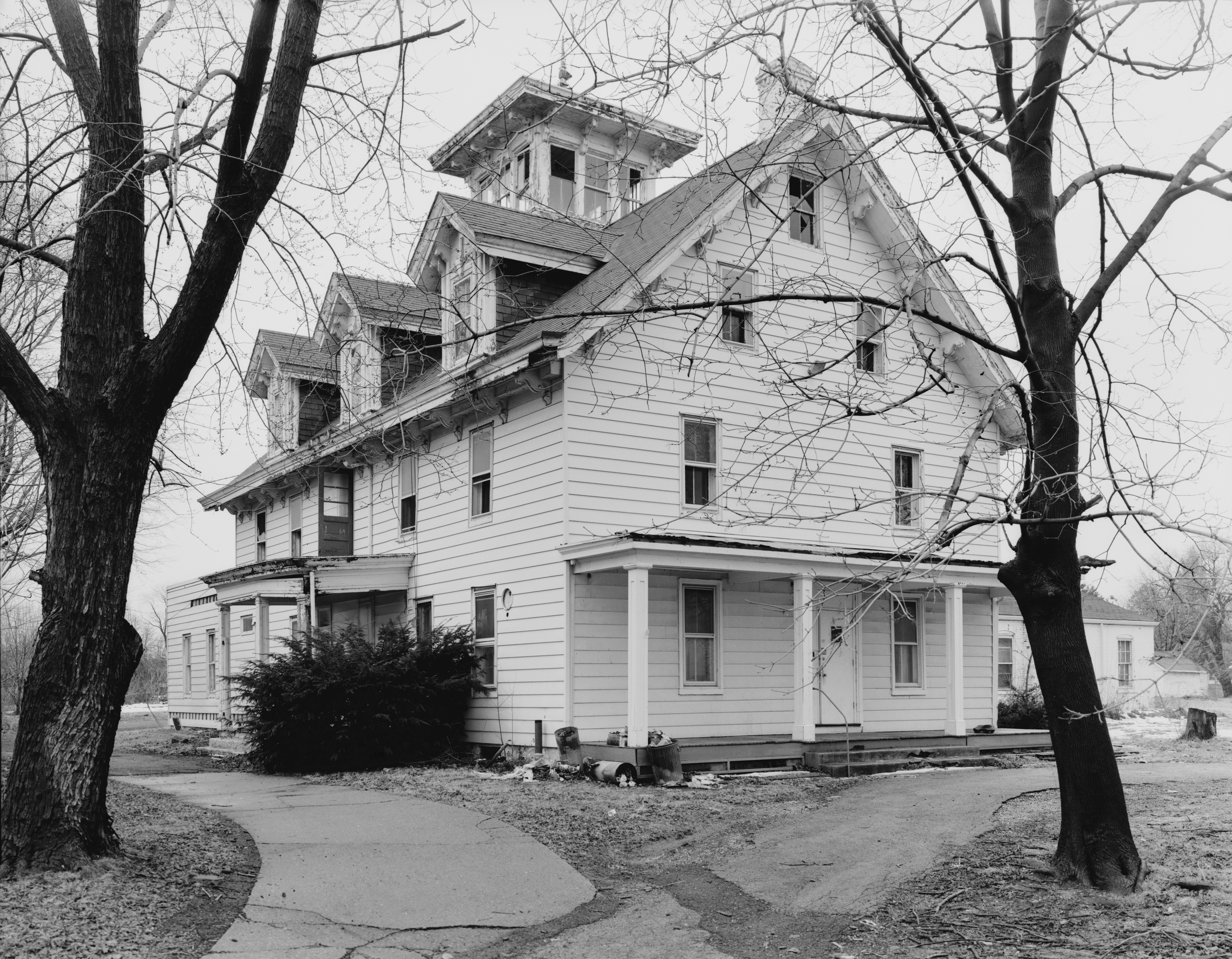
- Minquadale Home, HABS Photo, January 1983

- Location within Delaware Location within the United States
- Location: N. DuPont Highway, Wilmington, Delaware
- Coordinates: 39.706446°N 75.570289°W
- Area: less than one acre
- Built: 1864
- Architectural style: Italianate
- NRHP reference No.: 73000548
- Added to NRHP: June 4, 1973

Lobdell Estate, Minquadale Home, also known as the Minquadale Home for Aged Men, was a historic home and retirement home located at Minquadale near Wilmington, New Castle County, Delaware. It was built in 1864, and was a two and a half-story, five bays wide, stuccoed, and gable-roofed dwelling in the Italianate style. It featured large decorative brackets and a large cupola atop the roof. It was originally built by George Lobdell, a manufacturer of car wheels, as a summer home. In 1891, his vacation house was made over into a retirement home for Lobdell's employees of both sexes.

It was added to the National Register of Historic Places in 1973. It was demolished between 1984 and 2002.
