= Blackiston, Delaware =

Unincorporated community in Delaware, United States

- Unincorporated community
- Location within Delaware Location within the United States
- Coordinates: 39°16′14″N 75°42′2″W
- Country: United States
- State: Delaware
- County: Kent
- Elevation: 69 ft (21 m)
- Time zone: UTC-5 (Eastern (EST))
  - Summer (DST): UTC-4 (EDT)
- Area code: 302
- GNIS feature ID: 216040

Blackiston is an unincorporated community in Kent County, Delaware, United States. Blackiston is at the intersection of state routes 6 and 42, west of Clayton and northwest of Kenton.
