= Kent County and Delaware Bay Railroad =

American railroad company

The Kent County and Delaware Bay Railroad was an American railroad company in Kent County, Maryland and Kent County, Delaware. The railroad spanned from Chestertown, Maryland to Woodland Beach, Delaware where it met daily with steamboats from the Delaware City, Salem, and Philadelphia Steamboat Company.
