= Minquadale, Delaware =

Unincorporated community in Delaware, United States

Minquadale
- Unincorporated community
- Location within the state of Delaware Minquadale (the United States)
- Coordinates: 39°42′25″N 75°34′00″W
- Country: United States
- State: Delaware
- County: New Castle
- Time zone: UTC-5 (Eastern (EST))
  - Summer (DST): UTC-4 (EDT)
- GNIS feature ID: 214326

Minquadale is an unincorporated community in New Castle County, Delaware, United States. It is the location of the southernmost interchange between Interstate 495 and US 13. It was the site of the Lobdell Estate, Minquadale Home. The Minquadale Community Methodist Church was built in 1943.
