= Thomas Sutton House =

Historic house in Delaware, United States

- U.S. National Register of Historic Places
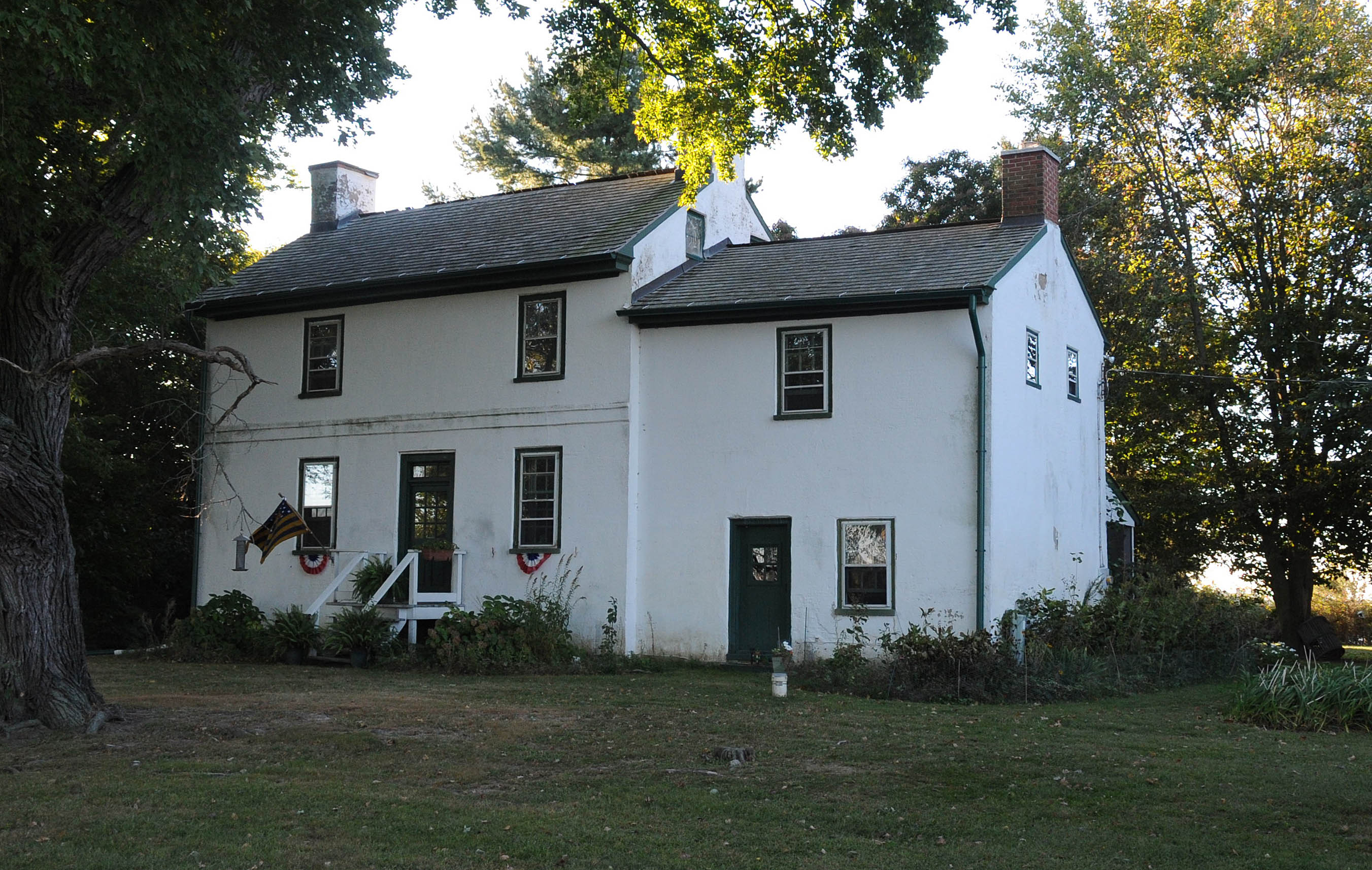

- Location within Delaware Location within the United States
- Location: Florio Road, Woodland Beach, Delaware
- Coordinates: 39°19′31″N 75°30′22″W
- Area: 1 acre (0.40 ha)
- Built: c. 1733
- NRHP reference No.: 73000505
- Added to NRHP: April 11, 1973

Thomas Sutton House, also known as the House on Game Preserve, is a historic home located at Woodland Beach, Kent County, Delaware. It was built about 1733, and is a two-story stuccoed brick house, constructed on a single pile, hall and parlor plan. It has a lower two-story wing that extends the axis of the main house. It serves as a residence and office for the personnel of the Woodland Beach Wildlife Area.

It was listed on the National Register of Historic Places in 1973.
