= Reedy Point Bridge =

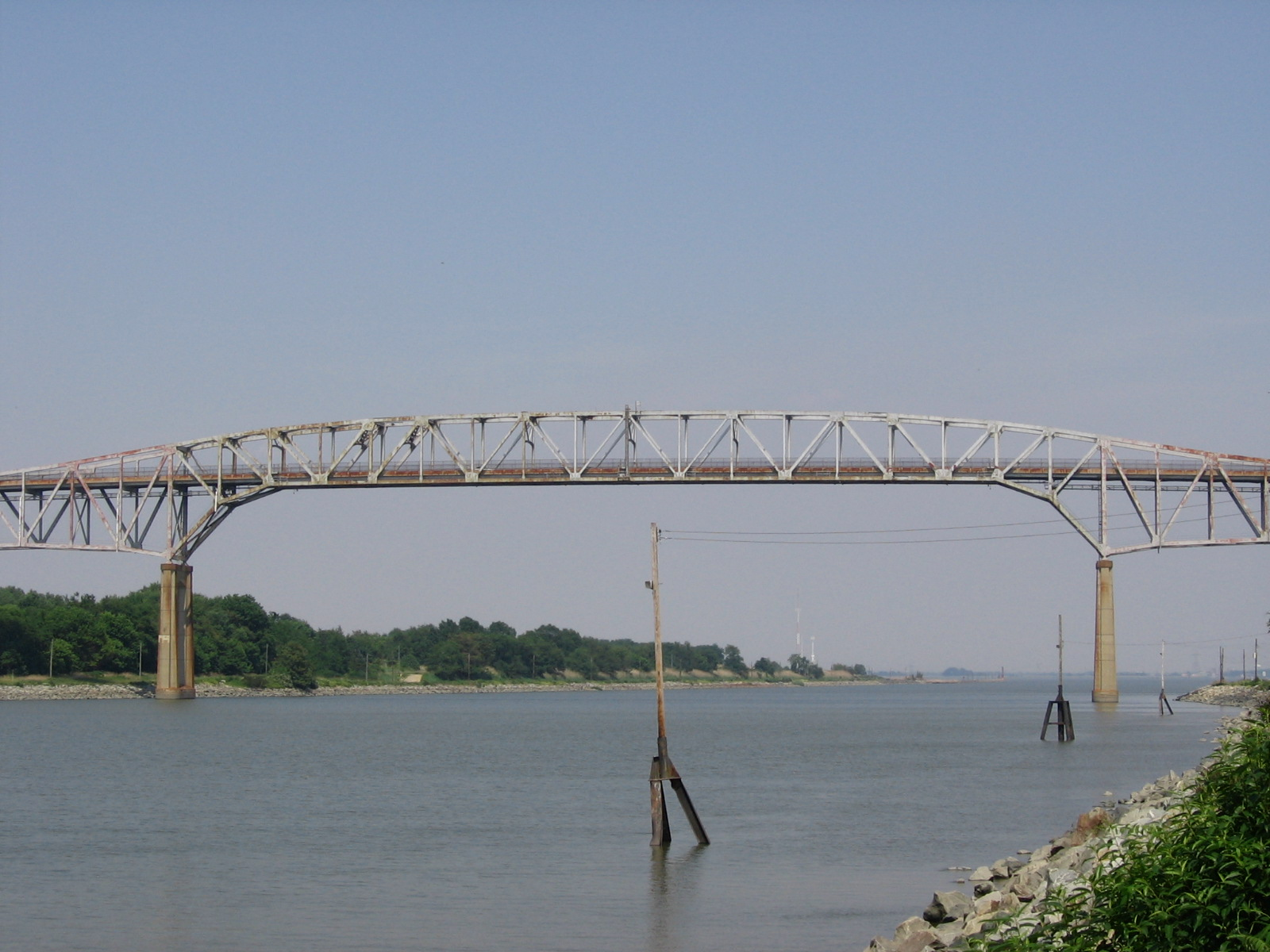
- Reedy Point Bridge
- Coordinates: 39°33′30″N 75°34′57″W
- Carries: 2 lanes of DE 9
- Crosses: Chesapeake & Delaware Canal
- Locale: Delaware City, Delaware
- Maintained by: U.S. Army Corps of Engineers

Characteristics
- Design: Cantilever truss bridge
- Clearance above: 135 feet

History
- Opened: 1968

Location
- Interactive map of Reedy Point Bridge

The Reedy Point Bridge carries Delaware Route 9 across the Chesapeake & Delaware Canal in Delaware City, Delaware, USA. A two-lane cantilever bridge similar in appearance to the Platt Bridge in Southwest Philadelphia (near Philadelphia International Airport), the Reedy Point Bridge was built by the U.S. Army Corps of Engineers and opened in 1968, replacing a lift bridge that crossed the C&D Canal prior to the 1955 widening project. Unlike the nearby St. Georges Bridge, the Reedy Point Bridge spans over salt marshes at the southern approach (which subjects Delaware Route 9 to periodic tidal flooding), the canal itself, and both Fort Dupont and the Governor Bacon Health Center. An obsolete double-leaf bascule drawbridge, located just less than 1/8 mi (0.20 km) north of the northern abutment, allows Delaware Route 9 to cross over the Delaware Ship Channel (itself an abandoned section of the original C&D Canal) and is technically part of the Reedy Point Bridge system. Both the high-level bridge and the drawbridge are maintained by the U.S. Army Corps of Engineers. In 2018, the old drawbridge was replaced with a fixed span.

From the top of the Reedy Point Bridge driving northbound, travelers may see points in three other states with Pennsylvania 12 miles (19 km) straight ahead, New Jersey immediately across the Delaware River, and Maryland 8 miles (13 km) to the left. Behind the Delaware Memorial Bridge on a clear day, travelers may see a glimpse of the two Comcast towers in Philadelphia. The bridge is visible on a clear day from the top floors of some skyscrapers in Philadelphia, about 35 miles (56 km) away.

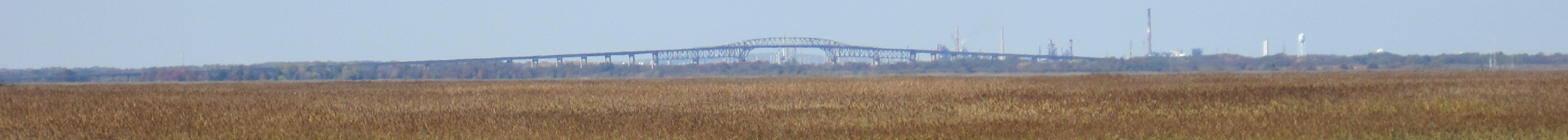
Reedy Point Bridge as seen from Elsinboro Township, New Jersey

== See also ==
- List of crossings of the Chesapeake & Delaware Canal
