= Cowgills Corner, Delaware =

Unincorporated community in Delaware, United States

- Unincorporated community
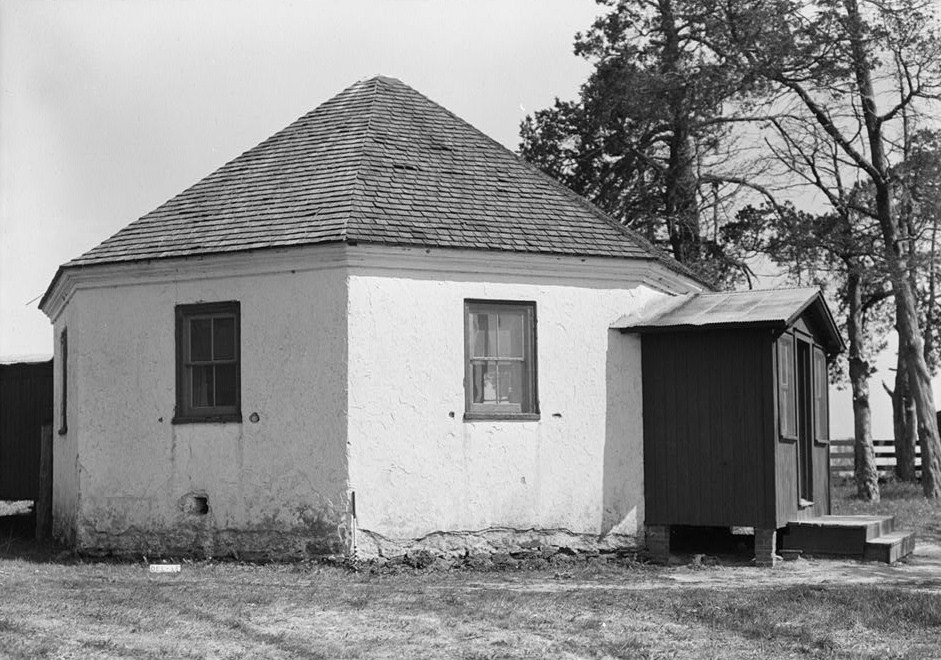
- Octagonal Schoolhouse

- Location within Delaware Location within the United States
- Coordinates: 39°11′45″N 75°28′49″W
- Country: United States
- State: Delaware
- County: Kent
- Elevation: 20 ft (6.1 m)
- Time zone: UTC-5 (Eastern (EST))
  - Summer (DST): UTC-4 (EDT)
- Area code: 302
- GNIS feature ID: 216074

Cowgills Corner (also known as Cowgill's Corner) is an unincorporated community in Kent County, Delaware, United States. Cowgills Corner is located on Delaware Route 9, 3.5 miles (5.6 km) northeast of Dover. The Octagonal Schoolhouse, which is listed on the National Register of Historic Places, is located in Cowgills Corner.

== History ==
Cowgills Corner's population was 36 in 1900.
