= Shellpot Branch =

The Shellpot Branch (also called the Shellpot Secondary or Shellpot Cutoff) is a former Pennsylvania Railroad/Penn Central through-freight railroad owned and operated by Norfolk Southern since its acquisition, along with CSX Transportation, of Conrail in 1999. The branch, which was built in 1888, allows Norfolk Southern, since the opening of a new bridge in 2001, to bypass the city of Wilmington, Delaware and allows direct access to both the Port of Wilmington and the New Castle Secondary, which connects to the Delmarva Subdivision of the Delmarva Central Railroad that runs to Central Delaware, Maryland, and Virginia's Eastern Shore. Both ends of the branch connect with Amtrak's Northeast Corridor and, like all of the PRR's through-freight lines, was electrified from 1935 until the Conrail era. The line was originally built doubly tracked, but was subsequently converted to single track.

== Route description ==
The line begins at its northern terminus at the Bell Interlocking near Claymont, Delaware, a flying junction 39.776234°N 75.47851°W built by the former Pennsylvania Railroad originally to allow thru-freight traffic access to the double-track Shellpot Branch from the four-track Philadelphia-Washington Mainline without crossing over any of the passenger-only tracks. Consisting of a single grade-separated overpass bridge used by northbound NEC (that is, Amtrak intercity and Wilmington/Newark Line commuter trains (southbound trains remain at ground level)), the two inner tracks which become the Shellpot Branch duck underneath of the bridge and comes level with the two passenger tracks at the Bellevue Substation 39°46′03″N 75°29′02″W, which converts the 138 kV, 25 Hz AC transmission power to the 11 kV, 25 Hz AC traction power used on the overhead catenary used by the Amtrak and SEPTA trains. See also Amtrak's 25 Hz Traction Power System.

South of Bellevue, the two electrified tracks reduce to a single track, but less than a mile after the reduction, a non-electrified track that becomes the Shellpot Branch splits back off the electrified single track that eventually goes into Amtrak's Wilmington Maintenance Facility 39.746802°N 75.52128°W. An additional non-electrified track which serves the former Chemours Edgemoor freight siding splits off from the NEC at the Interstate 495 underpass.

Just after the divergence from the NEC right-of-way, the line enters the NS Edgemoor Yard 39.745563°N 75.518303°W facility. The line parallels I-495 and passes under 12th Street, then crosses over the Christina River on a single-track turntable bridge that was rebuilt in 2001 39.728574°N 75.533645°W.

Past the bridge, the New Castle Secondary (which connects to the Delmarva Secondary and the Delmarva Central Railroad's Delmarva Subdivision at Porter, DE) splits off at a wye junction 39.726463°N 75.538409°W, also built in 2001 with the bridge, allowing both eastbound and westbound trains to access the line without having to go through Wilmington (which would only be allowed during overnight hours) and then reversing direction in Newport. The Shellpot Branch ends with the line rejoining the NEC at the line's Ragan interlocking 39.715252°N 75.594188°W near Interstate 95 in Newport, Delaware.

== Christina River bridges ==
The Shellpot branch features two separate swing bridges crossing the winding Christina River at different locations. The first bridge, "Bridge" or No. 3 Drawbridge, located 3.77 miles from Bellevue Tower, had become a dilapidated two-track structure that forced Conrail, due to budgetary restrictions, to abandon the bridge and restructure Shellpot Branch operations in the mid-1990s. For nearly ten years the bridge sat idle. A novel public-private partnership between Conrail's successor, Norfolk Southern, and the state of Delaware resulted in the state providing capital (about $13 million) to rebuild the bridge. In return, the bridge became a toll bridge for twenty years, with NS paying the state a fee for each car transported over the bridge. Due to the historic nature of the bridge, the movable span was removed and refurbished. The approach piers were replaced. Although the bridge has the width to accommodate two tracks, it was rebuilt with the single track structure centered within the bridge structure.

The second bridge, "Ward" or No. 4 Drawbridge, is located 5.22 miles from Bellevue, and has not required rebuilding. However, it is out of service to water traffic, as the bridge's control shack and interlocking signals have been removed, the central fender is overgrown with trees, and the Christina's navigable channel now stops just short of this bridge. The operator of "Ward" bridge also controlled an adjacent swing bridge which carried a former Reading Co. branch to Pigeon Point on the Delaware River, which crossed the Shellpot Branch on a diamond. The Reading branch was abandoned after Conrail was formed in 1976 and its bridge has been left in the open position ever since.
