= Woodland Beach, Delaware =

Unincorporated community in Delaware, United States

- Unincorporated community
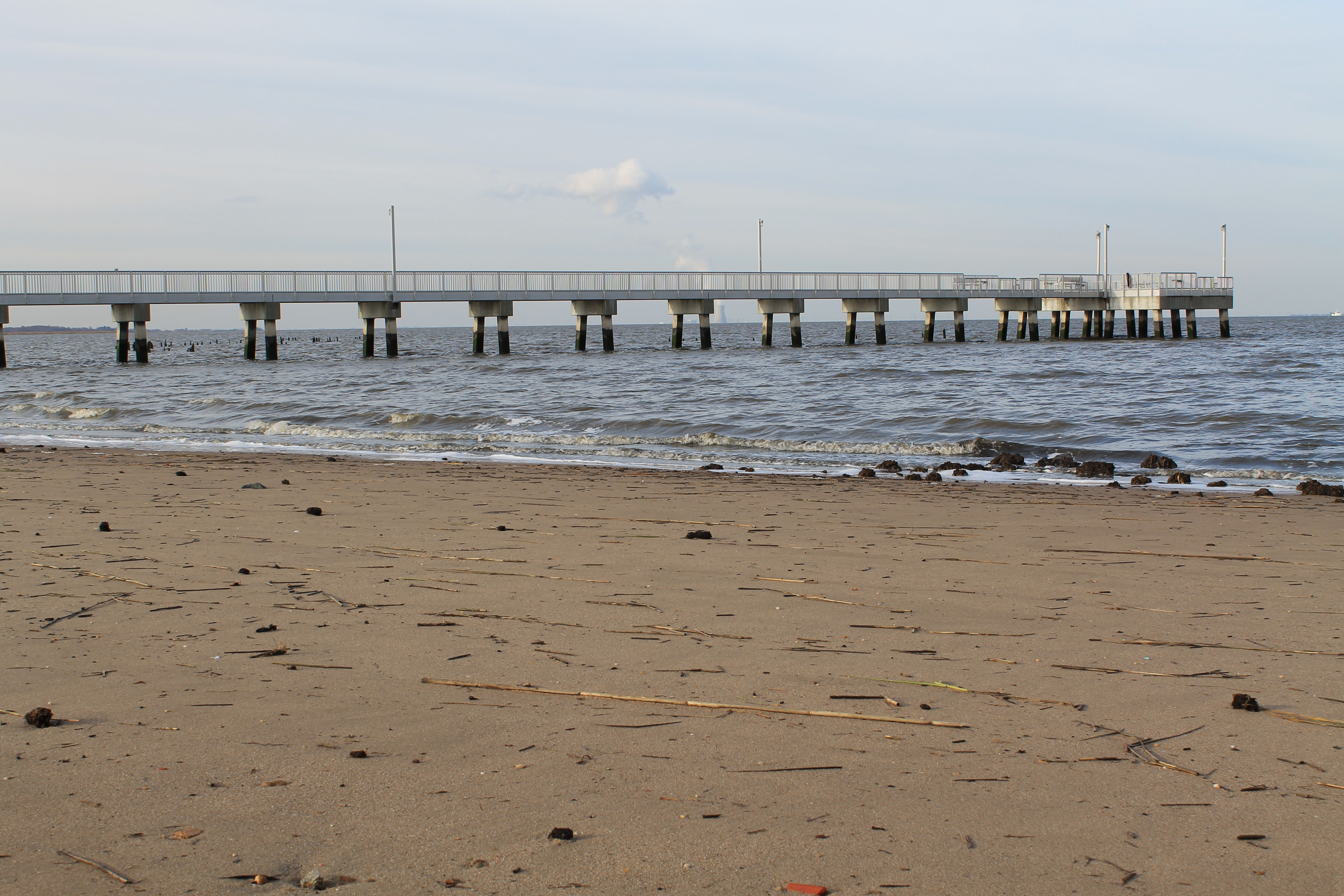
- Beach and pier at Woodland Beach

- Location within Delaware Location within the United States
- Coordinates: 39°20′00″N 75°28′29″W
- Country: United States
- State: Delaware
- County: Kent
- Elevation: 3 ft (0.91 m)
- Time zone: UTC-5 (Eastern (EST))
  - Summer (DST): UTC-4 (EDT)
- Area code: 302
- GNIS feature ID: 216417

Woodland Beach is an unincorporated community in Kent County, Delaware, United States. Woodland Beach is along the Delaware Bay, east of Smyrna at the eastern terminus of Delaware Route 6. The Woodland Beach Wildlife Area is located in Woodland Beach.

== History ==
In the 1880s, Woodland Beach was a resort area that was the terminus for the Kent County and Delaware Bay Railroad and daily steamboats from the Delaware City, Salem, and Philadelphia Steamboat Company. Amenities included the Woodland Park Hotel; a two-story pavilion with live music, a bar, restaurant, glass observatory on top, and games such as billiards, shuffleboards, and archery; a forested park area with tables, chairs, and swings; and facilities for fishing, swimming, and hunting.

The Thomas Sutton House was listed on the National Register of Historic Places in 1973.
