= Interstate 495 (Delaware) =

Highway in Delaware

Interstate 495
- Vietnam Veterans Memorial Highway
- I-495 highlighted in red

Route information
- Auxiliary route of I-95
- Maintained by DelDOT
- Length: 11.47 mi (18.46 km)
- Existed: 1962–present
- History: Completed in 1977
- NHS: Entire route

Major junctions
- South end: I-95 / I-295 in Newport
- US 13 / US 13 Bus. in Minquadale; DE 9A in Wilmington; US 13 / DE 3 in Edgemoor; US 13 in Claymont
- North end: I-95 at the Pennsylvania state line

Location
- Country: United States
- State: Delaware
- Counties: New Castle

Highway system
- Interstate Highway System; Main; Auxiliary; Suffixed; Business; Future; Delaware State Route System; List; Byways
← DE 491	→ I-895

Interstate 495 (I-495) is an 11.47-mile-long (18.46 km) auxiliary Interstate Highway in the US state of Delaware. The highway, named the Vietnam Veterans Memorial Highway, serves as a six-lane bypass of I-95 around the city of Wilmington. I-495 begins at an interchange with I-95 and I-295 near Newport to the southwest of Wilmington. From here, the road heads east to the Port of Wilmington, where it turns northeast and crosses the Christina River as it heads to the east of downtown Wilmington. Upon reaching Edgemoor, I-495 runs between the Delaware River to the east and U.S. Route 13 (US 13) to the west, continuing to Claymont. In Claymont, I-495 turns north and merges into northbound I-95 at an interchange with Delaware Route 92 (DE 92) just south of the Pennsylvania state line.

Plans for a bypass of Wilmington to the east date back to 1948 and were incorporated into the Interstate Highway System in 1956. This Interstate bypass was numbered I-495 in the 1960s. Construction of I-495 took place during the course of the 1970s, with the entire length of the highway completed and opened to traffic in 1977. Between 1978 and 1980, I-95 was designated along the I-495 alignment while the South Wilmington Viaduct along I-95 was reconstructed; during this time the route through Wilmington was known as I-895. The US 13/DE 3 interchange in Edgemoor opened in 1988. In 2014, the bridge over the Christina River was closed due to tilting support columns until repairs were completed.

== Route description ==
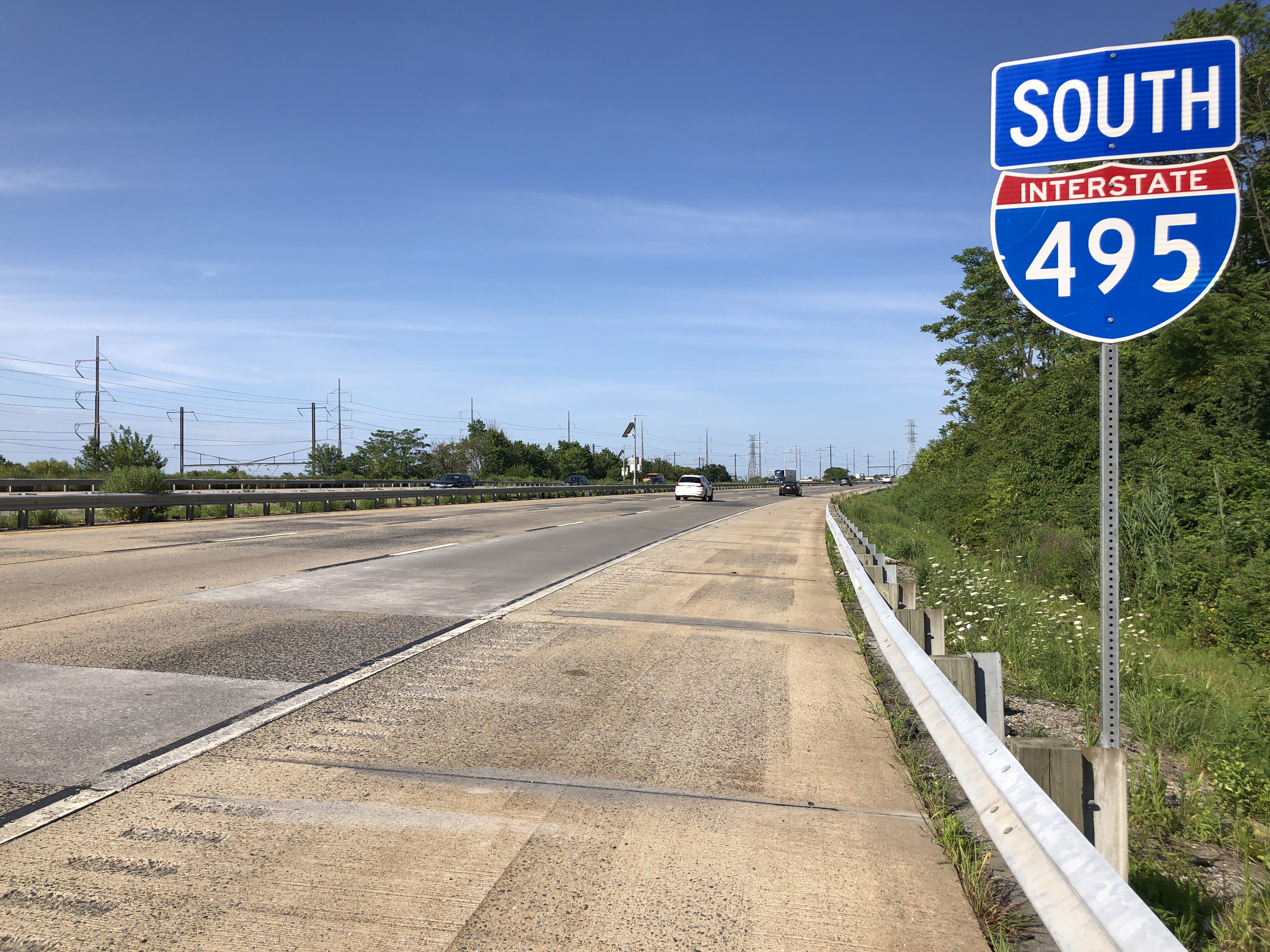
I-495 southbound approaching interchange with US 13 and DE 3 in Edgemoor

I-495 begins at an interchange with I-95/US 202 and I-295 near the town of Newport, heading to the east on a six-lane freeway called the Vietnam Veterans Memorial Highway. At the southern terminus, southbound I-495 merges into southbound I-95 and also has a ramp that provides easier access to the DE 141 interchange along I-95. The route passes over the Jack A. Markell Trail and runs between the Christina River to the north and a landfill to the south prior to reaching an interchange with US 13 and the southern terminus of US 13 Business (US 13 Bus.) in Minquadale. Past this, the highway enters industrial areas and reaches the DE 9A exit near the Port of Wilmington, turning to the northeast. From here, the highway heads into the eastern part of the city of Wilmington. I-495 comes to a bridge that crosses over Norfolk Southern Railway's New Castle Secondary and Christiana Avenue Industrial Track railroad lines, DE 9A, and the Christina River. The freeway passes near another landfill as it comes to the 12th Street exit.

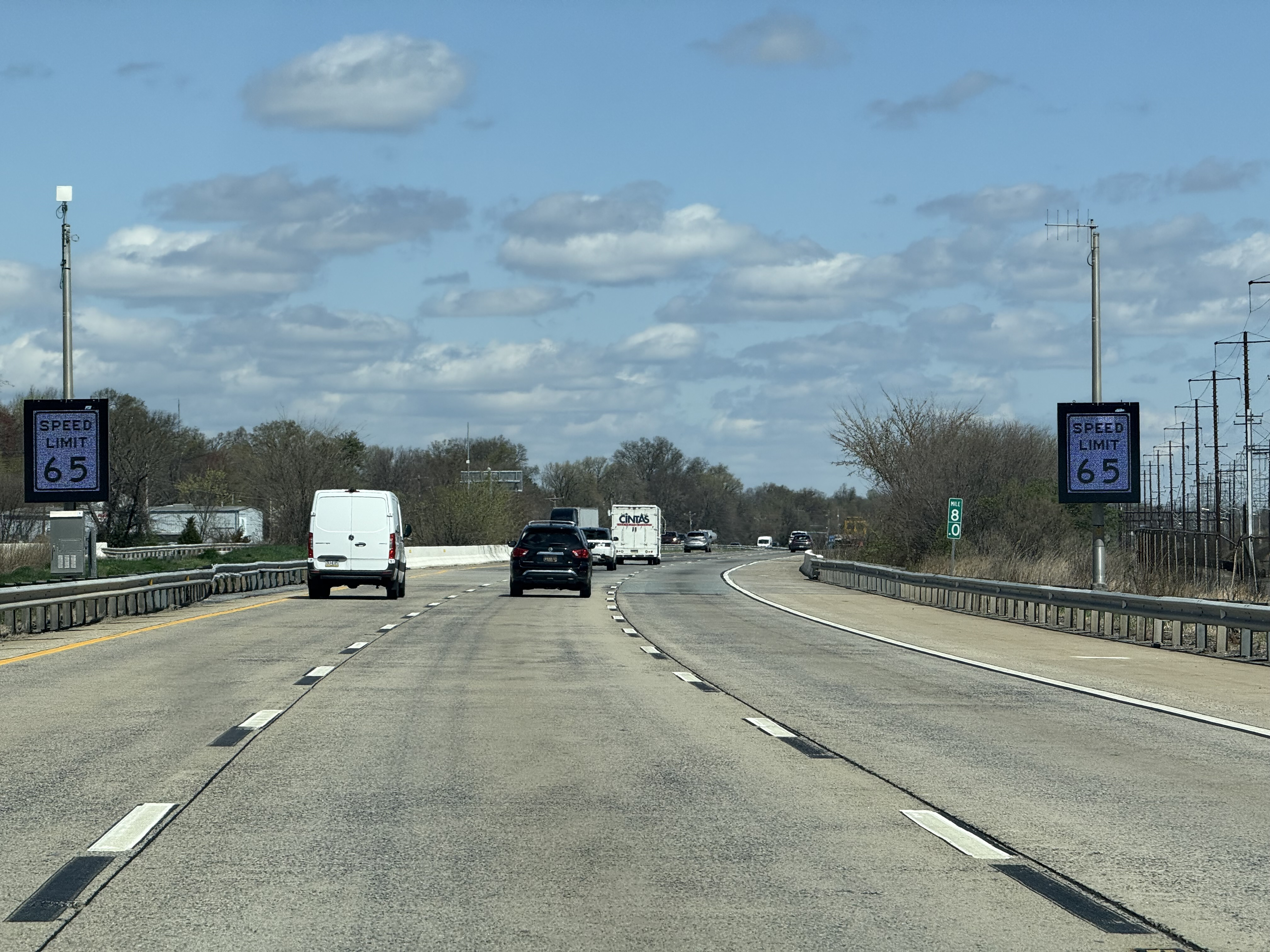
Variable speed limit signs are a feature of the entire length of I-495 in Delaware

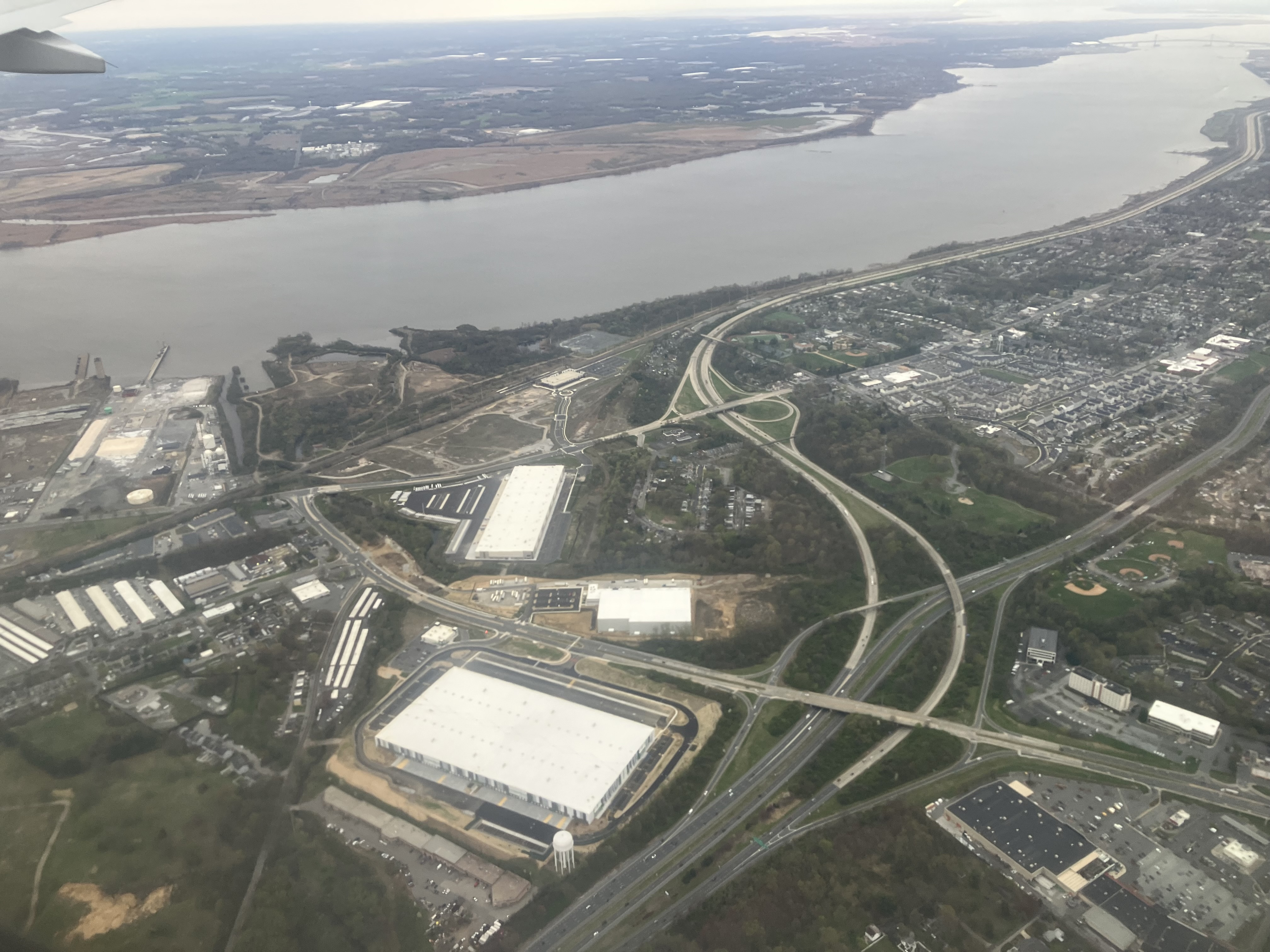
North terminus. I-495 runs to the top right of the image along with the Delaware River

The road runs through some marshland, crossing Shellpot Creek and Norfolk Southern Railway's Edgemoor Lead railroad line, before coming to an interchange in an industrial area of Edgemoor that connects to the southern terminus of DE 3 as well as to US 13. Following this interchange, I-495 crosses over Norfolk Southern Railway's Shellpot Secondary and Amtrak's Northeast Corridor railroad lines before it runs between US 13 and suburban areas to the west and the Northeast Corridor and the Delaware River to the east, passing northwest of Fox Point State Park and crossing Stoney Creek and Perkins Run. I-495 continues along this configuration until it reaches Claymont. US 13 heads farther west from the freeway and I-495 makes a turn to the north away from the railroad tracks and the river near Claymont station along SEPTA's Wilmington/Newark Line that uses the Northeast Corridor. The road comes to another exit for US 13 before merging into northbound I-95 at the DE 92 interchange near the former Tri-State Mall and the Pennsylvania state line. Southbound I-495 features an exit to DE 92; the remaining ramps of the DE 92 interchange connect directly to I-95. Southbound, the I-495 splitoff from I-95 actually starts in Pennsylvania but crosses into Delaware 220 feet (67 m) later before the exit to DE 92. This ramp is inventoried by the Pennsylvania Department of Transportation as State Route 8009.

I-495 has an annual average daily traffic count ranging from a high of 105,159 vehicles at the south end of Wilmington near the Christina River to a low of 22,379 vehicles at the ramp to I-95 at the southern terminus. As part of the Interstate Highway System, the entire length of I-495 is a part of the National Highway System, a network of roads important to the country's economy, defense, and mobility.

== History ==
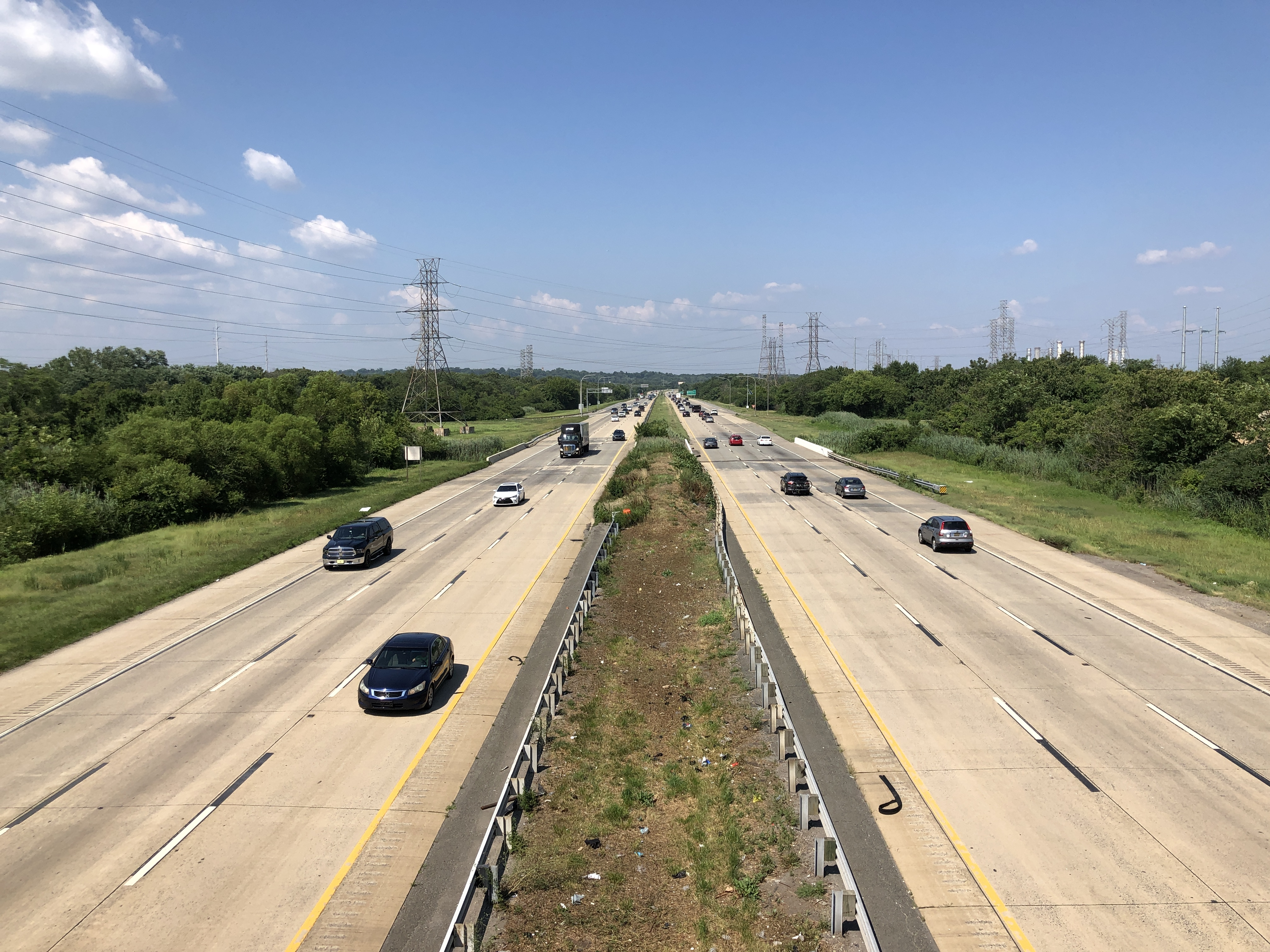
I-495 northbound at the 12th Street interchange in Wilmington

In 1948, the Wilmington Transportation Study proposed two new roads running between the southern end of Wilmington and the Pennsylvania state line to improve traffic flow in the Wilmington area. Route A followed the current alignment of I-95 through the city while Route B bypassed the city to the east along the current alignment of I-495. In 1956, the Interstate Highway System was created, with FAI-3 proposed along the current alignment of I-495. In 1960, design work on FAI-3 was underway. The route of FAI-3 was numbered as I-495 in 1962. In 1968, structural design for bridges along I-495 was underway. The same year, the first construction contracts began with three demolition contracts, the building of a culvert under the Penn Central railroad line at Holly Oak Creek, and the relocation of a section of US 13 to the west to allow for room to build I-495. In 1970, work continued on relocating US 13 along with the construction of bridges carrying the interstate over Stoney Creek. A contract was awarded to build I-495 between Edgemoor and I-95 in Claymont in 1971. The same year, work was underway on building the bridge over the Christina River. Design work on the interstate was completed at this time. The following year, construction contracts were awarded to build I-495 south of the Christina River and to stabilize the road near Cherry Island. Paving was also underway between the Christina River and Edgemoor. In 1973, contracts were let to build structures along the freeway between the Christina River and Edgemoor. Work on the highway between New Castle Avenue and the Christina River bridge was finished in 1975. In 1976, the first section of I-495 was opened between US 13 and I-95 in Claymont. The same year, the bridge carrying the highway over Edgemoor Road was completed. In June 1977, the remainder of I-495 was completed and opened to traffic.

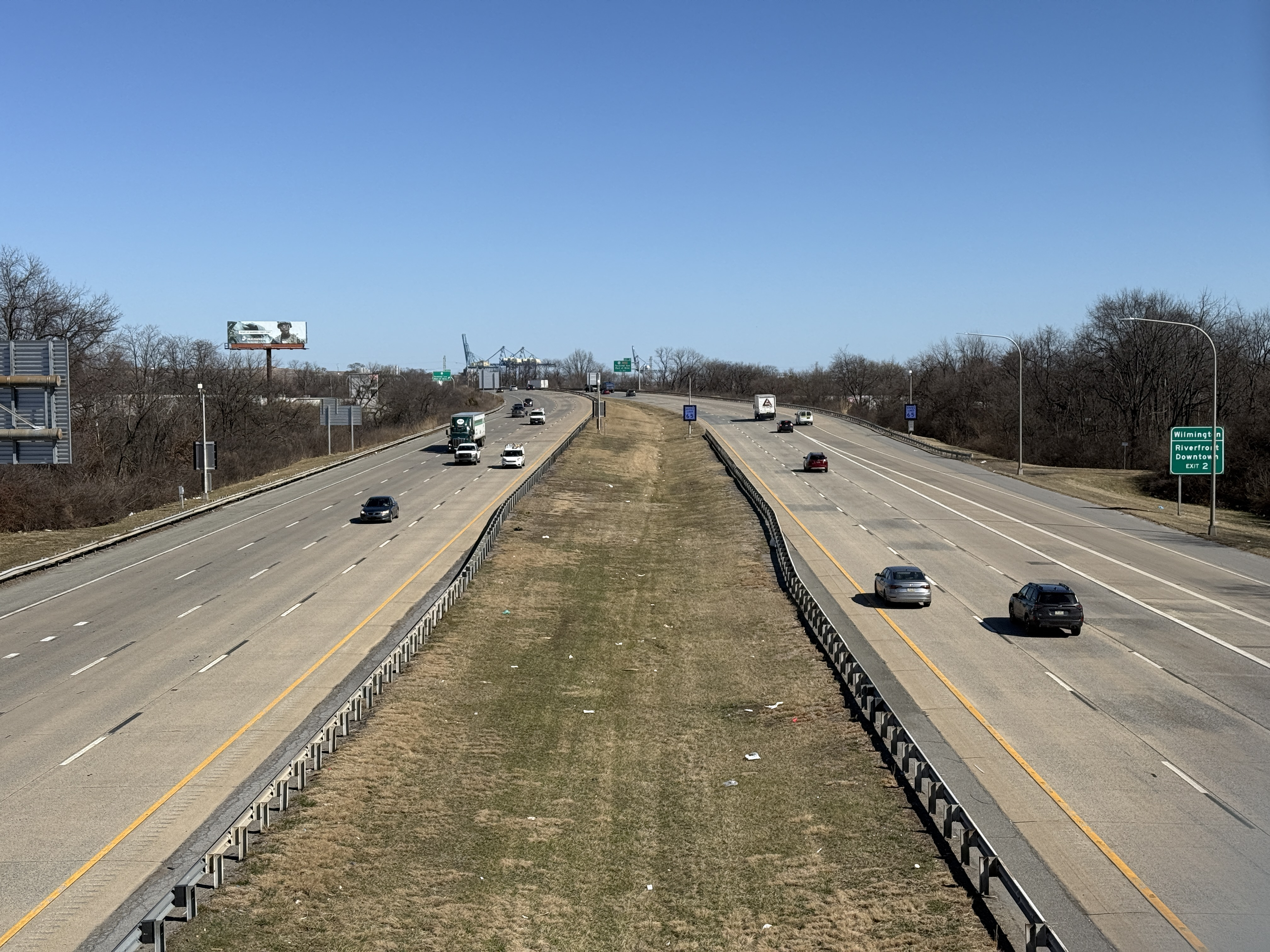
I-495 northbound past the US 13/US 13 Bus. interchange in Wilmington

On June 28, 1978, the American Association of State Highway and Transportation Officials (AASHTO) approved rerouting I-95 along the I-495 alignment. However, AASHTO disapproved renumbering the alignment of I-95 through Wilmington as I-595. On October 27 of that year, AASHTO gave conditional approval for I-95 through Wilmington to be designated as I-195 from I-95 near Newport north to US 202 while the route from US 202 north to I-95 in Claymont would become I-395. I-895 was designated along the conditionally approved route of I-195 and I-395 on June 25, 1979. In 1980, the South Wilmington Viaduct along I-895 was reconstructed. On November 14, 1980, I-95 and I-495 were returned to their original alignments, with I-895 decommissioned. In 1988, an interchange was built at US 13 and DE 3 in Edgemoor. This interchange was numbered as exit 4, which resulted in the US 13 interchange in Claymont being renumbered from exit 4 to exit 5. In February 1988, a tanker drove off the Christina River bridge and exploded, with the truck driver killed. The accident forced the closure of I-495 in order to repair the heat damage to the bridge structure. In 2000, through traffic from I-95 was detoured onto I-495 while I-95 was rebuilt between Wilmington and the Pennsylvania state line.

On June 2, 2014, the bridge over the Christina River was closed after it was discovered that four support columns were tilting. I-495 was indefinitely closed to traffic between the DE 9A and 12th Street interchanges. Delaware Department of Transportation officials later announced plans to have the southbound side of the bridge reopened by Labor Day, with the northbound side to follow by late September. The southbound lanes reopened on July 31, a month earlier than expected, and the northbound lanes reopened on August 23. During the closure, traffic was detoured onto I-95, and several major roads in the Wilmington area experienced increased traffic congestion.

== Exit list ==
The entire route is in New Castle County.

Location	mi	km	Exit	Destinations	Notes
Newport	0.00	0.00	—	I-95 south – Newark, Baltimore	Southern terminus
Newport			—	I-295 north – New Castle, Delaware Memorial Bridge	Southbound left exit and northbound entrance; southern terminus of I-295
Newport			—	To DE 141 (US 202 south) – Newport, New Castle	Southbound exit only; feeds into I-95 exits 5A-B; serves Wilmington Airport
Minquadale	1.98	3.19	1	US 13 north / US 13 Bus. – Wilmington	Northbound exit and southbound entrance; US 13 not signed; access to Wilmington station
Minquadale	1.98	3.19	1	US 13 to US 40 – Wilmington, Dover	Southbound exit and northbound entrance; access to New Castle Airport and Wilmington station
Wilmington	2.97	4.78	2	DE 9A (Terminal Avenue) – Port of Wilmington	Access to Riverfront Attractions
Wilmington	4.45	7.16	3	12th Street	
Edgemoor	5.97	9.61	4	US 13 (Governor Printz Boulevard) / DE 3 north (Edgemoor Road) – Edgemoor Industrial Park	Signed as exits 4B (Edgemoor) and 4A (US 13) southbound; DE 3 not signed southbound; southern terminus of DE 3
Claymont	10.83	17.43	5	US 13 (Philadelphia Pike) – Claymont	
Claymont	11.47	18.46	6	DE 92 (Naamans Road)	Southbound exit only
Claymont	11.47	18.46	—	I-95 north – Chester, Philadelphia	Northern terminus; Pennsylvania state line; exit 11 on I-95
1.000 mi = 1.609 km; 1.000 km = 0.621 mi: Incomplete access
