= Flemings Landing, Delaware =

Unincorporated community in Delaware, United States

- Unincorporated community
- Location within Delaware Location within the United States
- Coordinates: 39°21′14″N 75°32′55″W
- Country: United States
- State: Delaware
- County: New Castle
- Elevation: 3 ft (0.91 m)
- Time zone: UTC-5 (Eastern (EST))
  - Summer (DST): UTC-4 (EDT)
- Area code: 302
- GNIS feature ID: 216096

Flemings Landing is an unincorporated community in New Castle County, Delaware, United States. Flemings Landing is located along Delaware Route 9 just north of the Smyrna River and the Kent County line, to the northeast of Smyrna.
