= Octagonal Schoolhouse (Cowgill's Corner, Delaware) =

- U.S. National Register of Historic Places
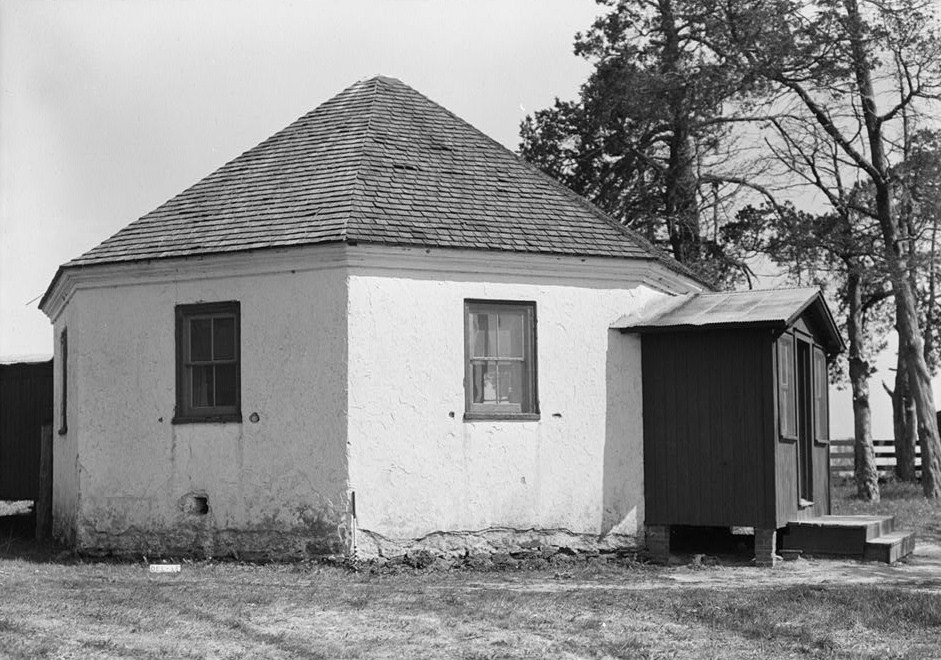
- Octagonal School House, HABS Photo, April 1936

- Location within Delaware Location within the United States
- Location: East of Cowgill, Cowgill's Corner, Delaware
- Coordinates: 39°11′44″N 75°28′21″W
- Area: 1 acre (0.40 ha)
- Built: 1836
- NRHP reference No.: 71000217
- Added to NRHP: March 24, 1971

Octagonal Schoolhouse, also known as the Eight-square School House, is a historic octagonal schoolhouse building located in Cowgill's Corner, Kent County, Delaware.

== History ==
In 1829, Delaware became the second state to establish free public education for its residents. This schoolhouse, which opened in 1836, is one of the first buildings from that movement, and the only one not significantly altered at the time of its addition to the National Register of Historical Places. Manlove Hayes, who lived south of Leipsic is said to have designed the structure since education benefited his numerous children and step children. It is a one-room and one-story stuccoed stone building. It has a pyramidal shingled roof with a stepped stone cornice. The first teacher was Joshua G. Baker. Both boys and girls attended the school and were seated in two circles in the interior, with boys facing the outside and girls the inside. It remained a public school well into the 20th century, after which it was used as a community meeting house.

It was added to the National Register of Historic Places in 1971.
