= Woodland Beach Wildlife Area =

Protected area in Kent County, Delaware

Coordinates: 39°20′N 75°30′W

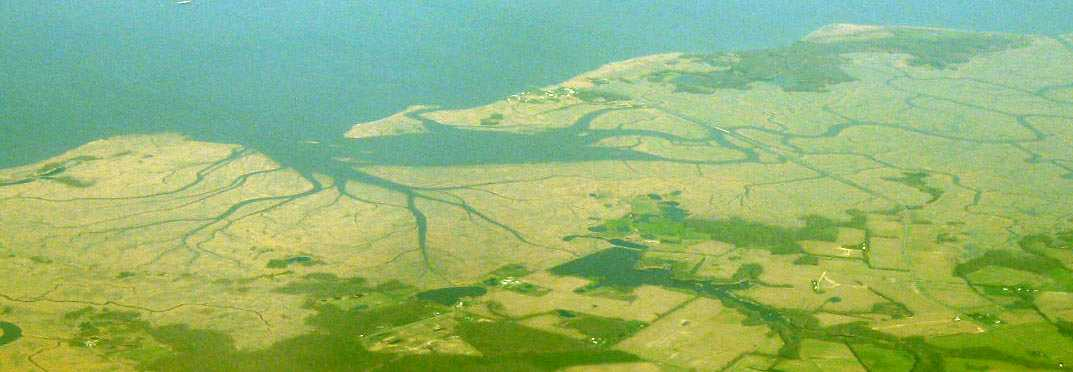
Oblique air photo of Woodland Beach Wildlife Area, April 2010, facing east

Woodland Beach Wildlife Area is a state wildlife area located in Kent County, Delaware, along the shore of the Delaware Bay. It is 6,320 acres (2,558 ha) in size and is managed by the Delaware Department of Natural Resources and Environmental Control (DNREC), Division of Fish & Wildlife.

Much of the area is a transgressive brackish marsh.

The Thomas Sutton House serves as a residence and office for the personnel of the Woodland Beach Wildlife Area. It was listed on the National Register of Historic Places in 1973.
