= Port of Wilmington (Delaware) =

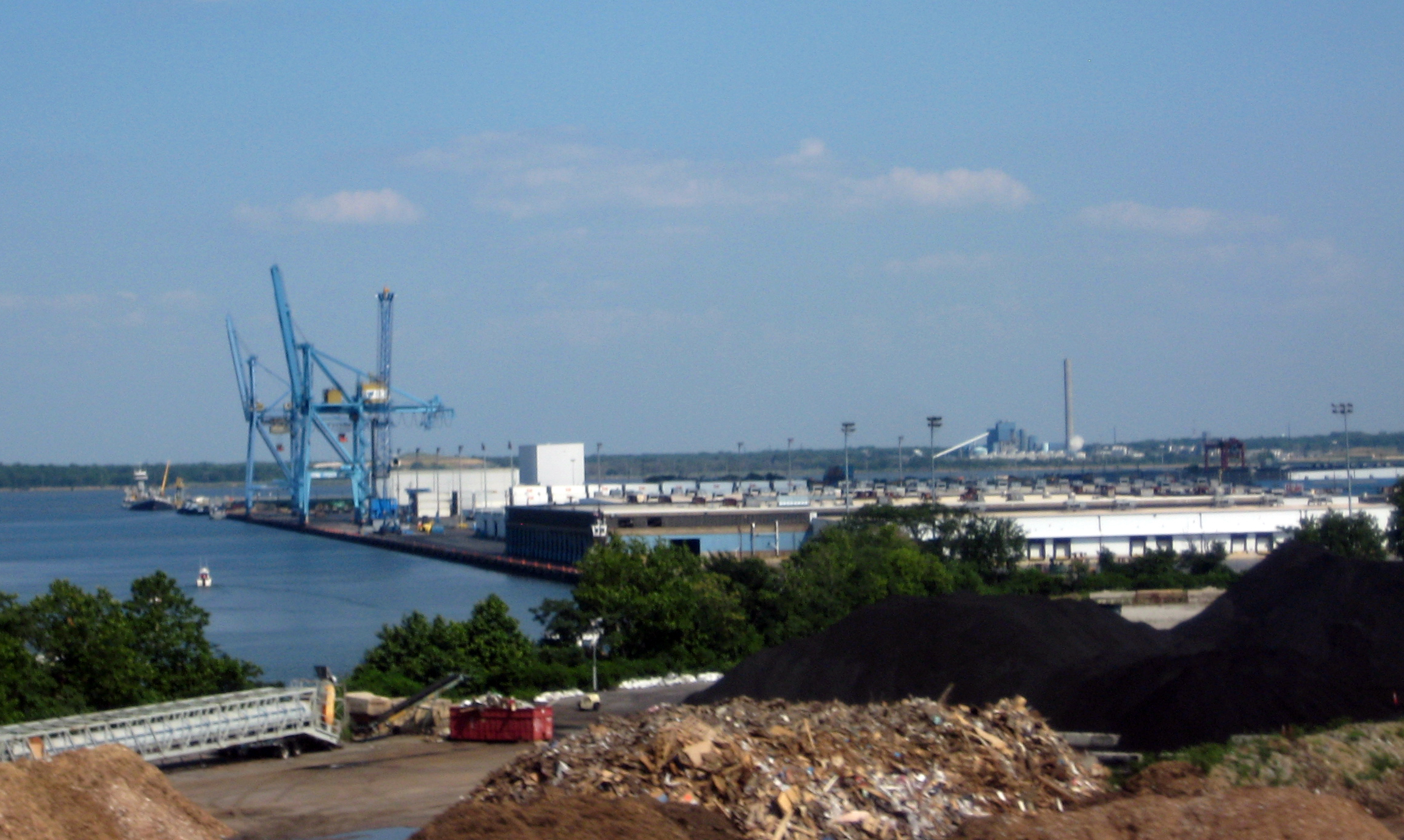
- The Port of Wilmington as seen from Interstate 495 on July 9, 2011.
- Interactive map of Port of Wilmington

Location
- Country: United States
- Location: Wilmington, Delaware
- Coordinates: 39°43′06″N 75°31′25″W
- UN/LOCODE: USILG

Details
- Opened: 1923
- Operated by: Port Wilmington
- Owned by: Diamond State Port Corporation
- Land area: 308 acres (1.25 km^{2})
- No. of berths: 10 (general cargo × 7, petroleum × 1, floating RoRo × 1, auto and RoRo × 1)
- Chief Executive Officer: Joe Cruise
- Cargo handling: 3 gantry cranes (50-ton cap. × 2, 75-ton cap. × 1)
- Dry storage facilities: 50 acres (0.20 km^{2}) open space; 250,000 square feet (23,000 m^{2}) dry warehouse space
- Temperature controlled storage facilities: 6 warehouses (800,000 square feet (74,000 m^{2}) chilled/freezer storage; 16,000 square feet (1,500 m^{2}) controlled atmosphere storage)

Statistics
- Vessel arrivals: 624 (2018)
- Annual cargo tonnage: 6,603,444 (2018)
- Annual container volume: 384,641 (2018)
- Annual liquid bulk petroleum: 1,409,000 tons (CY2009)
- Main imports/exports: Fresh fruit, bananas, juice concentrate, automobiles, steel, forest products, livestock, petroleum
- Website http://www.portofwilmington.com

The Port of Wilmington (formerly Wilmington Marine Terminal) is a deep-water port located at the confluence of the Christina River and the Delaware River in Wilmington, Delaware, 65 miles (105 km) from the Atlantic Ocean. The port has been ranked as the top North American port for imports of fresh fruit, bananas, and juice concentrate, and as having the largest dock-side cold storage facility.

== History ==
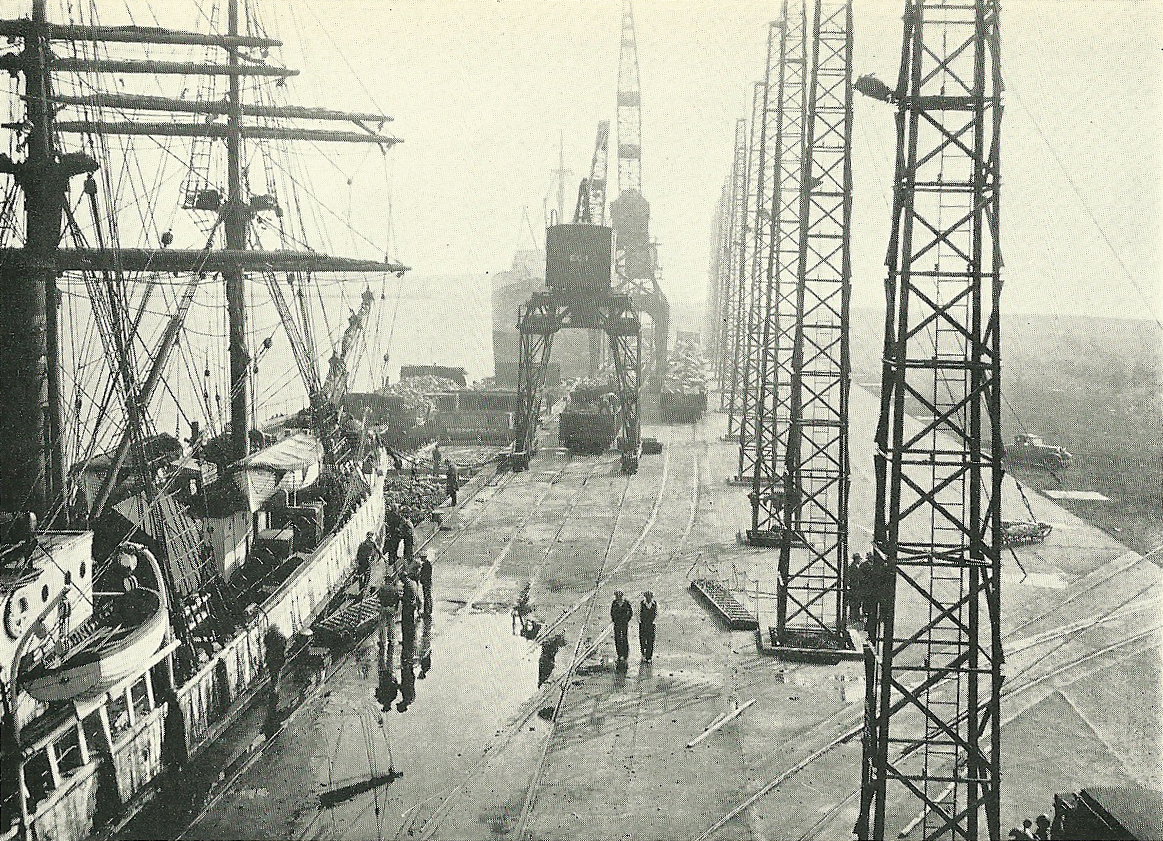
Aerial view of Wilmington Marine Terminal showing cargo-handling facilities, ca. 1920s.

The first development of a marine terminal in Wilmington was completed in 1923 at the location of the current Port of Wilmington. A number of improvements and expansions were made to the port over the course of the following decades. In 1972, Del Monte made the port its "principal North American port-of-discharge" for bananas and pineapples. Four years later, Volkswagen of America chose the port as its hub for imports of Volkswagen, Audi, and Porsche automobiles to North America and the Port of Wilmington constructed a floating dock to receive these products. In June 1995, the state of Delaware purchased the port from the city of Wilmington and created Diamond State Port Corporation to operate the facility. In October 2007, the Port of Wilmington became the first port to implement the Transportation Worker Identification Credential.

In 2011, the Port sought to expand operations to include new construction of a berth suitable for container ships on the Delaware River.

== Facilities ==
Port of Wilmington terminal location
1 Port of Wilmington

The port has a 3,435-foot (1,047 m) wharf face along the Christina River with depths of 35–38 feet (11–12 m) alongside. There are nine berths facing the Christina River, including seven general cargo berths, one petroleum berth, one floating roll-on/roll-off (RoRo) berth. An automobile berth faces the Delaware River.

Cargo handling facilities include two 50-ton capacity gantry cranes and one 75-ton capacity gantry crane. The port has 50 acres (0.20 km^{2}) of open space for storage, 250,000 square feet (23,000 m^{2}) of dry warehouse space, and six temperature-controlled warehouses totaling 816,000 square feet (75,800 m^{2}) of storage space. The port is served by CSX and Norfolk Southern railroads and is located near Interstate 495.

The Seamen's Center, located in the Port of Wilmington complex, provides services to visiting seamen such as entertainment, transportation, and spiritual guidance. The center is supported by the Episcopal Diocese of Delaware.

Not located at the Port, but in close proximity, is a refrigerated trailer hub which accommodates the multi-day parking of trucks with perishable cargo destined for transport out of the Port.

== Operations ==
The Port of Wilmington handles fresh fruit, bananas, juice concentrate, automobiles, steel, forest products, livestock, petroleum, and other cargo. The port has handled specialized cargo such as Antares rocket parts from Ukraine and wind turbine blades from South America. In 2018, the port handled 624 vessels; total tonnage of 6,603,444 short tons (5,990,544 t), of which 1,447,625 short tons (1,313,263 t) was dry bulk cargo; 384,641 TEUs of containerized cargo.

The Port receives approximately US$2 million from the State of Delaware in support of operations on an annual basis.

Dole Food Company operations make the port the largest facility in the United States for banana imports.

Magellan Midstream Partners operates a tank farm in the port.

== See also ==
- United States container ports
