= Delaware Route 58 =

State highway in New Castle County, Delaware, United States

Delaware Route 58
- Churchmans Road

Route information
- Maintained by DelDOT
- Length: 3.86 mi (6.21 km)
- Existed: 1985–present

Major junctions
- West end: DE 4 in Christiana
- DE 7 in Christiana; I-95 in Christiana; DE 37 near New Castle
- East end: DE 273 near Hares Corner

Location
- Country: United States
- State: Delaware
- Counties: New Castle

Highway system
- Delaware State Route System; List; Byways
← DE 54	→ DE 62

Delaware Route 58 (DE 58), also known as Churchmans Road, is a state highway in New Castle County, Delaware. The route, which is signed east-west, runs from DE 4 adjacent to the Christiana Hospital in Christiana southeast to DE 273 near Hares Corner. The road passes through suburban areas between Wilmington and Newark, intersecting DE 7 and Interstate 95 (I-95) in Christiana and DE 37 near the Wilmington Airport. Churchmans Road was originally a county road that was paved in the 1930s and realigned twice in the 1950s. DE 58 was designated onto it in the 1980s.

== Route description ==
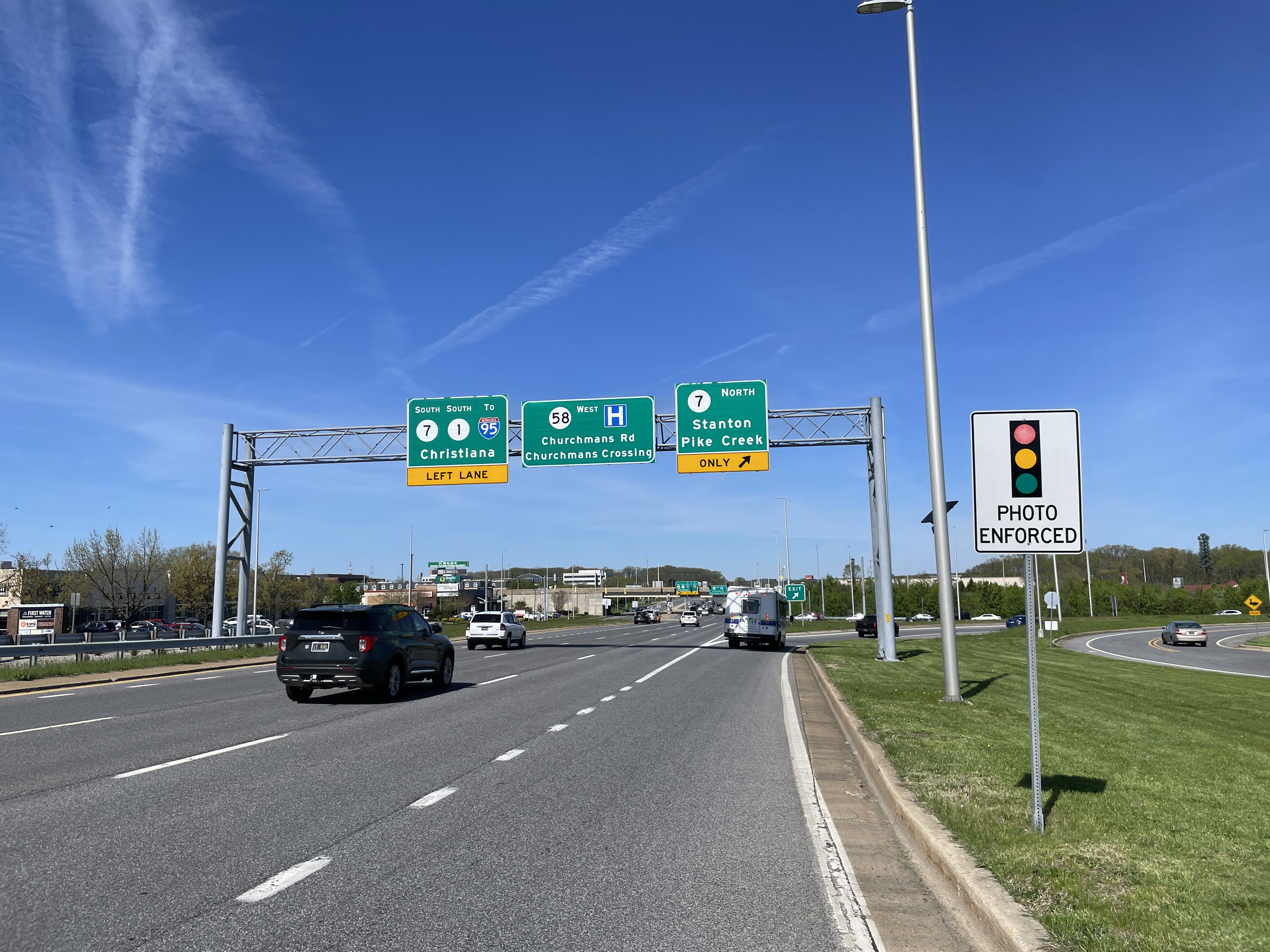
DE 58 westbound at DE 7 in Christiana

DE 58 begins at an intersection with DE 4 in Christiana. Past this intersection, the road continues northwest as Delaware Park Boulevard to provide access to Delaware Park – which consists of a Thoroughbred horse racetrack, casino, and golf course – and the Churchmans Crossing station on SEPTA's Wilmington/Newark Line that runs along Amtrak's Northeast Corridor railroad line. From DE 4, DE 58 heads east on Churchmans Road, a four-lane divided highway. The route passes to the north of Christiana Hospital and runs through commercial development before coming to a partial cloverleaf interchange with the DE 7 freeway a short distance north of the northern terminus of DE 1 at the I-95 (Delaware Turnpike) interchange. Just east of that interchange, DE 58 forms the southern border of the Stanton Campus of Delaware Technical Community College. The route crosses over I-95 (Delaware Turnpike), where there is a ramp from I-95 southbound to DE 58. This is the only direct ramp between DE 58 and I-95, as all other access between the two routes must be made via DE 7.

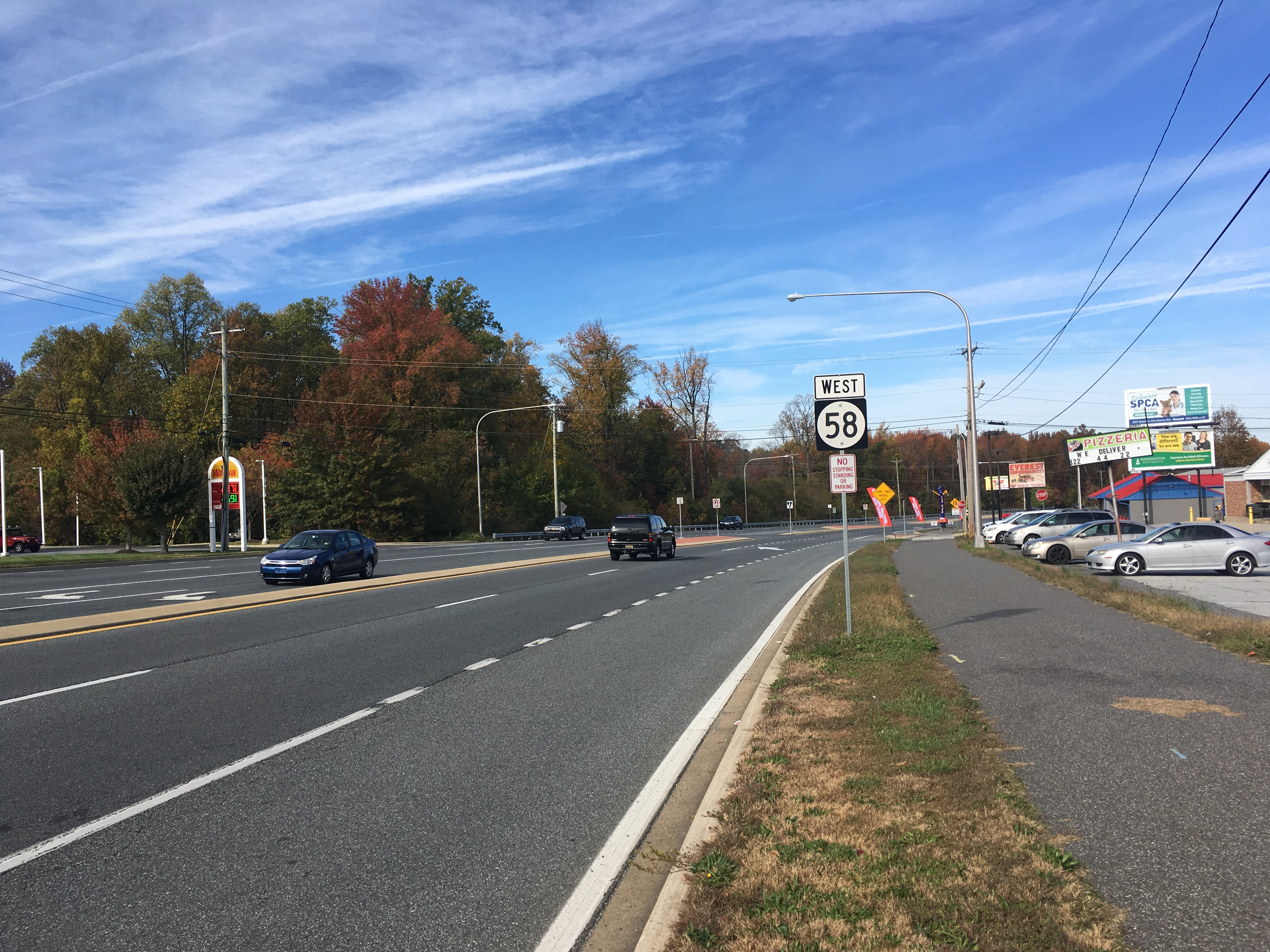
DE 58 westbound past DE 37 near New Castle

Past I-95, DE 58 becomes a two-lane undivided road and heads to the southeast through residential areas, crossing the Christina River. The route curves south through commercial development, widening back into a four-lane divided highway and intersecting DE 37. Past the intersection with DE 37, DE 58 continues southeast as a two-lane undivided road and skirts the southwestern edge of Wilmington Airport. The route passes through light industrial development and reaches its terminus at DE 273 near Hares Corner.

DE 58 has an annual average daily traffic count ranging from a high of 26,430 vehicles at the DE 1/DE 7 interchange to a low of 10,203 vehicles at the DE 37 intersection.

== History ==
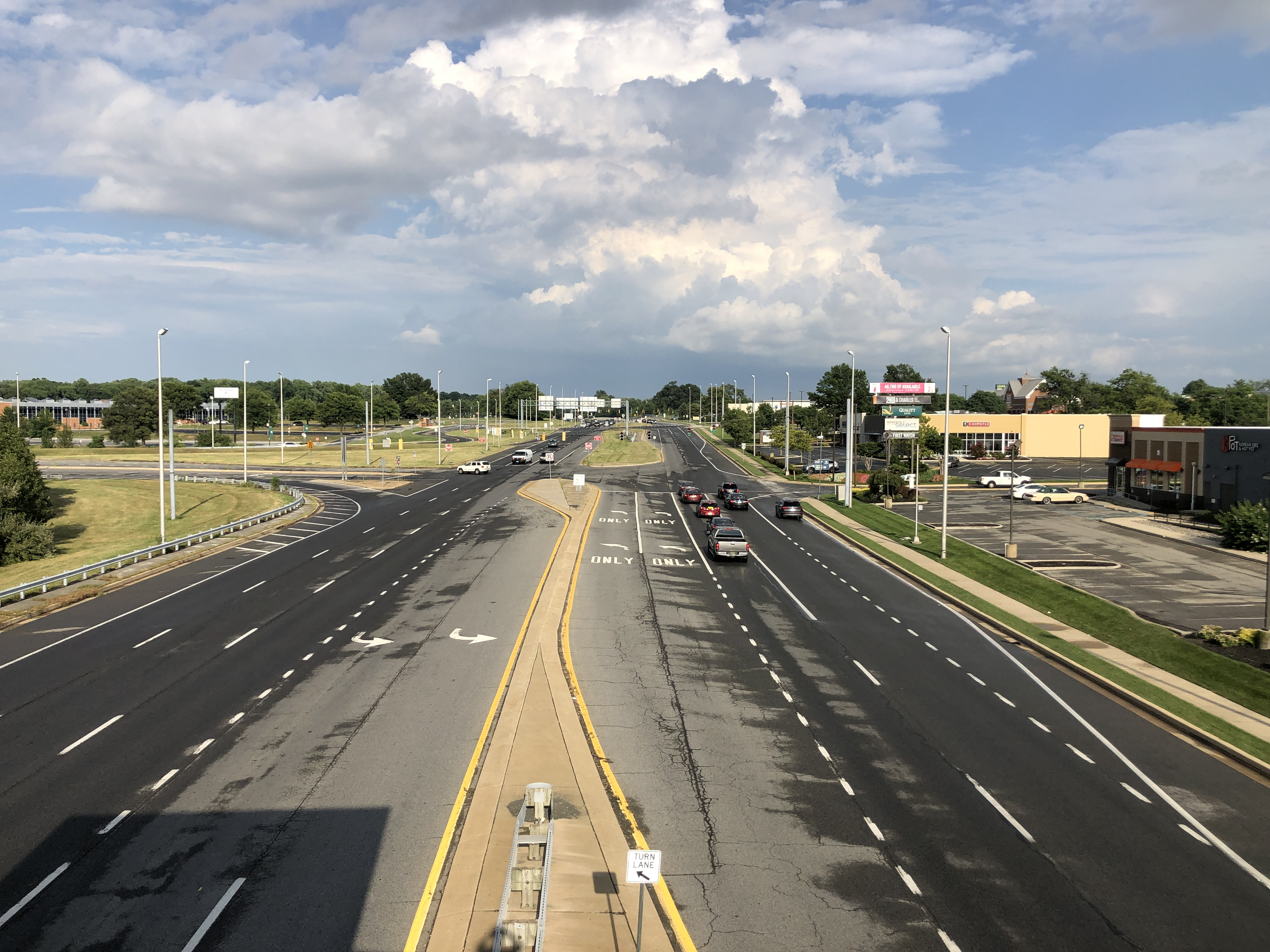
DE 58 eastbound at DE 7 near Stanton

Churchmans Road existed as a county road by 1920. The entire road was paved by 1936. Churchmans Road originally ran from DE 4 near Christiana to U.S. Route 13 north of Hares Corner. By 1952, the current alignment of Churchmans Road was constructed around the west side of Wilmington Airport from north of Airport Road to DE 273 near Hares Corner, with a portion of the original road southeast of Airport Road being removed; the two pieces of the former alignment that remained are now Old Churchmans Road. The current alignment of Churchmans Road west of DE 7 was built two years later, with the former alignment now Old Churchmans Road. DE 58 was designated onto its current alignment in 1985. In 1999, the intersection at DE 7 was converted into an interchange in a $25 million construction project. In 2003, construction began on a new bridge carrying DE 58 over I-95 to replace the previous bridge, which was over 40 years old and experienced deterioration. Construction of the new bridge, which cost $17 million, was originally planned to be finished in fall 2005 but completion was delayed to fall 2006. The new bridge carrying DE 58 over I-95 was built to accommodate future widening of I-95. Between May 2005 and June 2006, the portion of DE 58 at the intersection with DE 37 was reconstructed and widened into a divided highway as part of a $8.6 million project that also reconstructed and widened DE 37 along Airport Road between DE 58 and Commons Boulevard.

== Major intersections ==
Mileposts run from east to west. The entire route is in New Castle County.

Location	mi	km	Destinations	Notes
Christiana	3.86	6.21	DE 4 (Ogletown Stanton Road)	Western terminus
Christiana	3.03	4.88	DE 1 south / DE 7 to I-95 – Stanton, Pike Creek, Christiana	DE 7 exit 166; access to Delaware Tech
Christiana	2.53	4.07	I-95 (Delaware Turnpike)	Ramp from I-95 south to DE 58; I-95 exit 4B
	1.14	1.83	DE 37 (Airport Road)	
Hares Corner	0.00	0.00	DE 273 (Christiana Road)	Eastern terminus
1.000 mi = 1.609 km; 1.000 km = 0.621 mi: Incomplete access
