= Interstate 95 in Delaware =

Section of Interstate Highway in New Castle County, Delaware, United States

Interstate 95
- I-95 highlighted in red

Route information
- Maintained by DelDOT
- Length: 23.43 mi (37.71 km)
- Existed: 1956–present
- History: First section opened in 1963, completed in 1968
- NHS: Entire route

Major junctions
- South end: I-95 at the Maryland state line in Newark
- DE 896 in Newark; DE 273 in Christiana; DE 1 / DE 7 / DE 58 in Christiana; I-295 / I-495 / US 202 / DE 141 near Newport; DE 4 / DE 9 in Wilmington; DE 52 in Wilmington; US 202 / DE 202 in Wilmington; DE 3 near Bellefonte; I-495 / DE 92 in Claymont
- North end: I-95 at the Pennsylvania state line in Claymont

Location
- Country: United States
- State: Delaware
- Counties: New Castle

Highway system
- Interstate Highway System; Main; Auxiliary; Suffixed; Business; Future; Delaware State Route System; List; Byways
← DE 92	→ DE 100
← I-495	I-895	→ DE 896

Interstate 95 (I-95) is an Interstate Highway running along the East Coast of the United States from Miami, Florida, north to the Canadian border in Houlton, Maine. In the state of Delaware, the route runs for 23.43 miles (37.71 km) across the Wilmington area in northern New Castle County from the Maryland state line near Newark northeast to the Pennsylvania state line in Claymont. I-95 is the only primary Interstate Highway that enters Delaware, although it also has two auxiliary routes within the state (I-295 and I-495). Between the Maryland state line and Newport, I-95 follows the Delaware Turnpike (also known as the John F. Kennedy Memorial Highway), a toll road with a mainline toll plaza near the state line. Near Newport, the Interstate has a large interchange with Delaware Route 141 (DE 141) and the southern termini of I-295 and I-495. I-95 becomes the Wilmington Expressway from here to the Pennsylvania state line and heads north through Wilmington concurrently with U.S. Route 202 (US 202). Past Wilmington, I-95 continues northeast to Claymont, where I-495 rejoins the route right before the Pennsylvania state line.

Plans for a road along the I-95 corridor through Wilmington to the Pennsylvania state line predate the Interstate Highway System. After the Delaware Memorial Bridge was built in 1951, the Delaware Turnpike was proposed between the bridge approach near Farnhurst (present-day interchange between I-95 and I-295) and the Maryland state line near Newark in order to alleviate traffic congestion on parallel US 40. With the creation of the Interstate Highway System in 1956, both these roads were incorporated into I-95. Construction on the Delaware Turnpike began in 1957 and ended in 1963. Construction on building I-95 through Wilmington began in the early 1960s. I-95 was completed from Newport north to downtown Wilmington in 1966 and from Wilmington north to the Pennsylvania state line in 1968. Between 1978 and 1980, I-95 was temporarily rerouted along the I-495 bypass route while the South Wilmington Viaduct was reconstructed; during this time, the route through Wilmington was designated as Interstate 895 (I-895). Improvements continue to be made to the highway including widening projects and reconstruction of sections of the road and interchanges.

== Route description ==
=== Delaware Turnpike ===
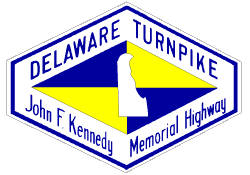
Delaware Turnpike
- Location: Newark–Newport
- Length: 13.34 mi (21.47 km)
- Existed: 1963–present

I-95 enters Delaware from Maryland southwest of the city of Newark in New Castle County. From the state line, the highway heads east (north) as the Delaware Turnpike (John F. Kennedy Memorial Highway), a six-lane freeway, through wooded areas. Not far from the Maryland state line, the road crosses Muddy Run before it comes to the Newark mainline toll plaza. I-95 widens to eight lanes and reaches a partial cloverleaf interchange with DE 896, which heads north to Newark and the University of Delaware and south to Glasgow. Following this interchange, the Interstate Highway crosses the Christina River and runs between industrial areas to the north and farm fields to the south, coming to bridges over Norfolk Southern Railway's Delmarva Secondary railroad line and DE 72 without access. The road heads through more woodland with nearby suburban development as it curves northeast, with the median widening for the Biden Welcome Center service plaza accessible from both directions. A short distance later, I-95 reaches a modified cloverleaf interchange with DE 273 west of Christiana. The freeway continues northeast and comes to a modified cloverleaf interchange with the DE 1/DE 7 freeway to the northwest of the Christiana Mall; this interchange serves as the northern terminus of DE 1. This interchange has flyover ramps from southbound I-95 to southbound DE 1/DE 7 and from northbound DE 1/DE 7 to northbound I-95; the northbound ramp splits onto both sides of the northbound lanes of I-95. The interchange with DE 1/DE 7 also has access to the Christiana Mall via ramps connecting to Mall Road.

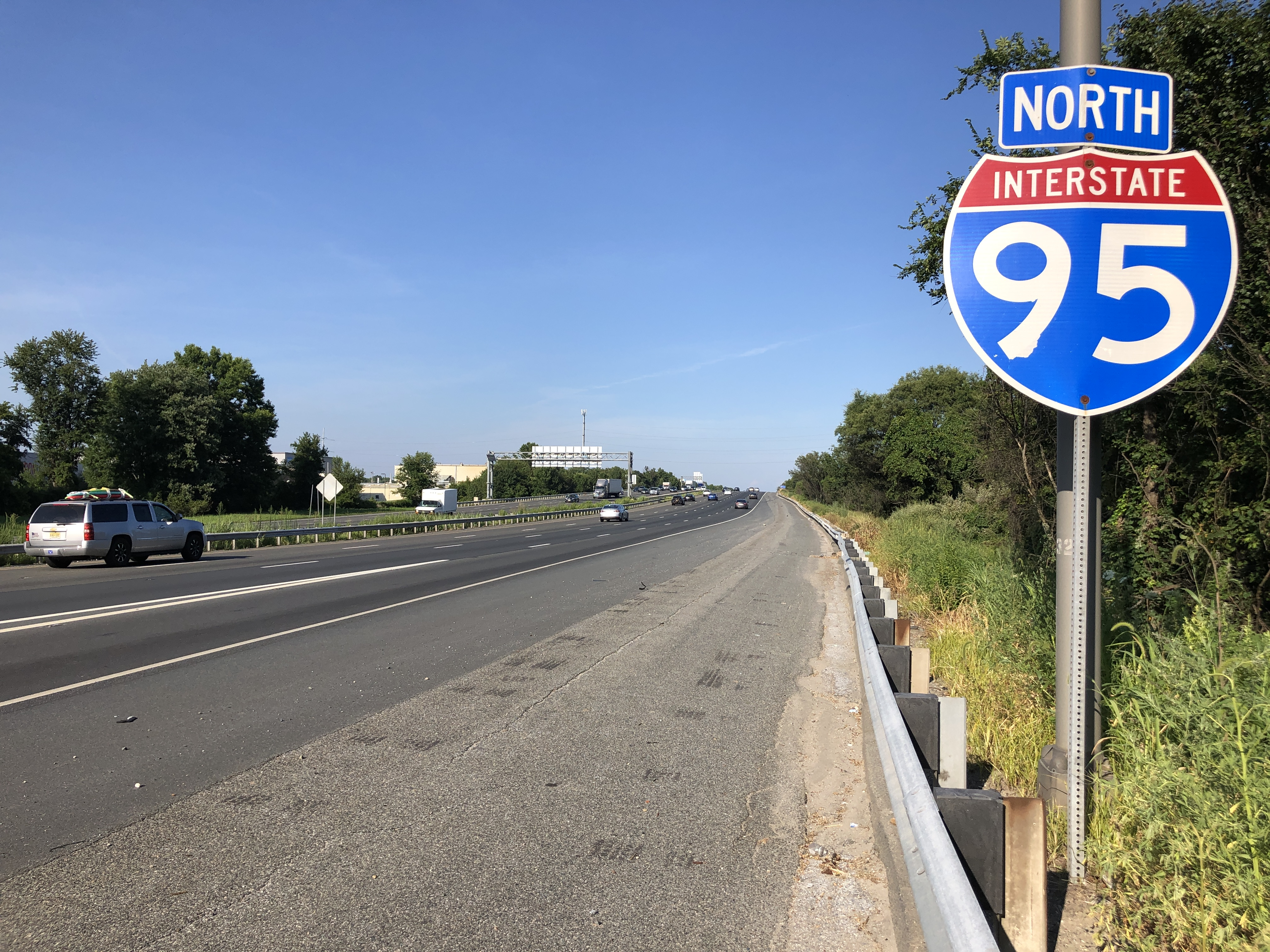
I-95 northbound past the DE 896 interchange near Newark

Past this interchange, I-95 widens to 10 lanes and passes under DE 58, with a ramp from southbound I-95 to DE 58 that provides the missing connection between southbound I-95 and northbound DE 7. The highway continues through woods before heading through Churchman's Marsh, where it crosses the Christina River. After this bridge, I-95 has a northbound ramp to Airport Road that serves to provide access to southbound US 202/DE 141. At this point, the lanes of the Interstate split further apart, and the northbound ramp for I-295 and northbound DE 141 exits off to parallel the northbound lanes of I-95. The ramp to northbound I-295 has two lanes while northbound I-95 carries four lanes. After this, I-95 crosses US 202/DE 141 at an interchange, at which point US 202 becomes concurrent with I-95. Upon crossing US 202/DE 141, the ramp to northbound DE 141 from the northbound I-295 ramp splits off while the ramp from US 202/DE 141 to northbound I-95 merges in from the left. Southbound, a collector–distributor road serves to provide access between I-95 and US 202/DE 141. Not far after encountering US 202/DE 141, I-295 splits off to the southeast, with the northbound entrance from I-295, the southbound exit to I-295, and the southbound entrance from I-295 on the left side of the road. At this point, the Delaware Turnpike comes to its northern terminus. After I-295, I-95/US 202 turns north and comes to a northbound exit and southbound entrance with the southern terminus of I-495, which bypasses the city of Wilmington to the east.

=== Wilmington Expressway ===
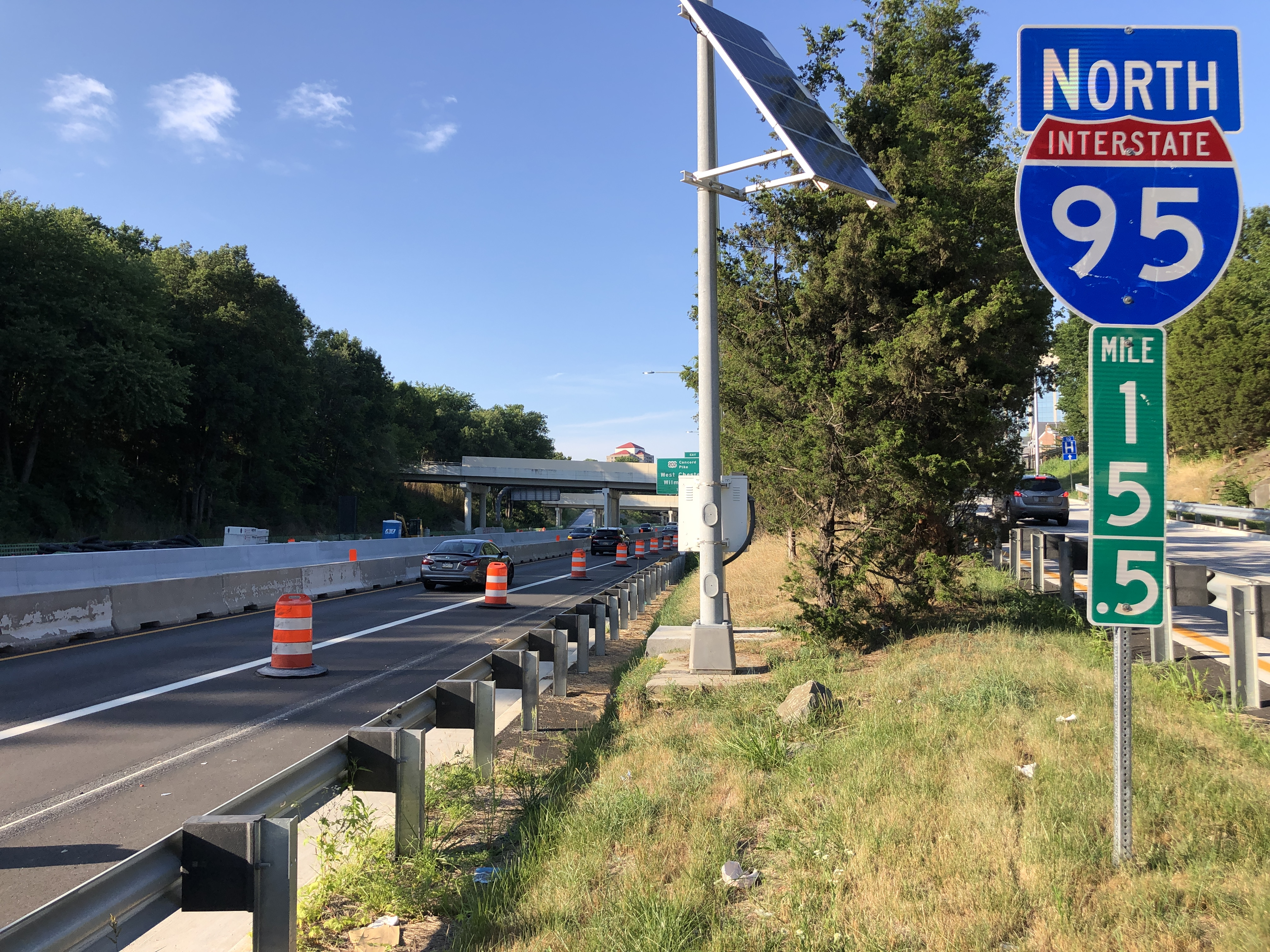
I-95/US 202 northbound past the DE 52 exit in Wilmington

Following the I-495 interchange, the median narrows and I-95/US 202 heads northeast through marshland as the six-lane Wilmington Expressway, crossing the Christina River. The freeway comes to bridges over Norfolk Southern Railway's Shellpot Secondary railroad line and Little Mill Creek as it continues through more wetlands west of the Russell W. Peterson Urban Wildlife Refuge, with Amtrak's Northeast Corridor railroad line running parallel a short distance to the northwest. The road enters Wilmington and curves to the north, passing to the west of Daniel S. Frawley Stadium, which is home of the Wilmington Blue Rocks baseball team, and the Chase Center on the Riverfront convention center as it heads west of the Wilmington Riverfront. I-95/US 202 heads toward downtown Wilmington and crosses onto a viaduct, passing over Norfolk Southern Railway's Wilmington & Northern Running Track and the Northeast Corridor before coming to an interchange with DE 4 and DE 48 that provides access to the downtown area and the Wilmington Riverfront. At this point, the four-lane freeway continues northeast, with one-way northbound North Adams Street to the east and one-way southbound North Jackson Street to the west serving as frontage roads. I-95/US 202 continues through residential areas to the west of downtown Wilmington and passes over DE 9, with a southbound exit. Farther northeast, the freeway heads into an alignment below street level and comes to an interchange with DE 52. Past this interchange, the road heads to the north and crosses Brandywine Creek, heading through Brandywine Park, which is a part of the Wilmington State Parks complex. The freeway curves northeast again and passes under CSX Transportation's Philadelphia Subdivision railroad line before reaching a modified cloverleaf interchange with the northern terminus of DE 202 at the northern edge of Wilmington, at which point US 202 splits from I-95 to head north along Concord Pike.

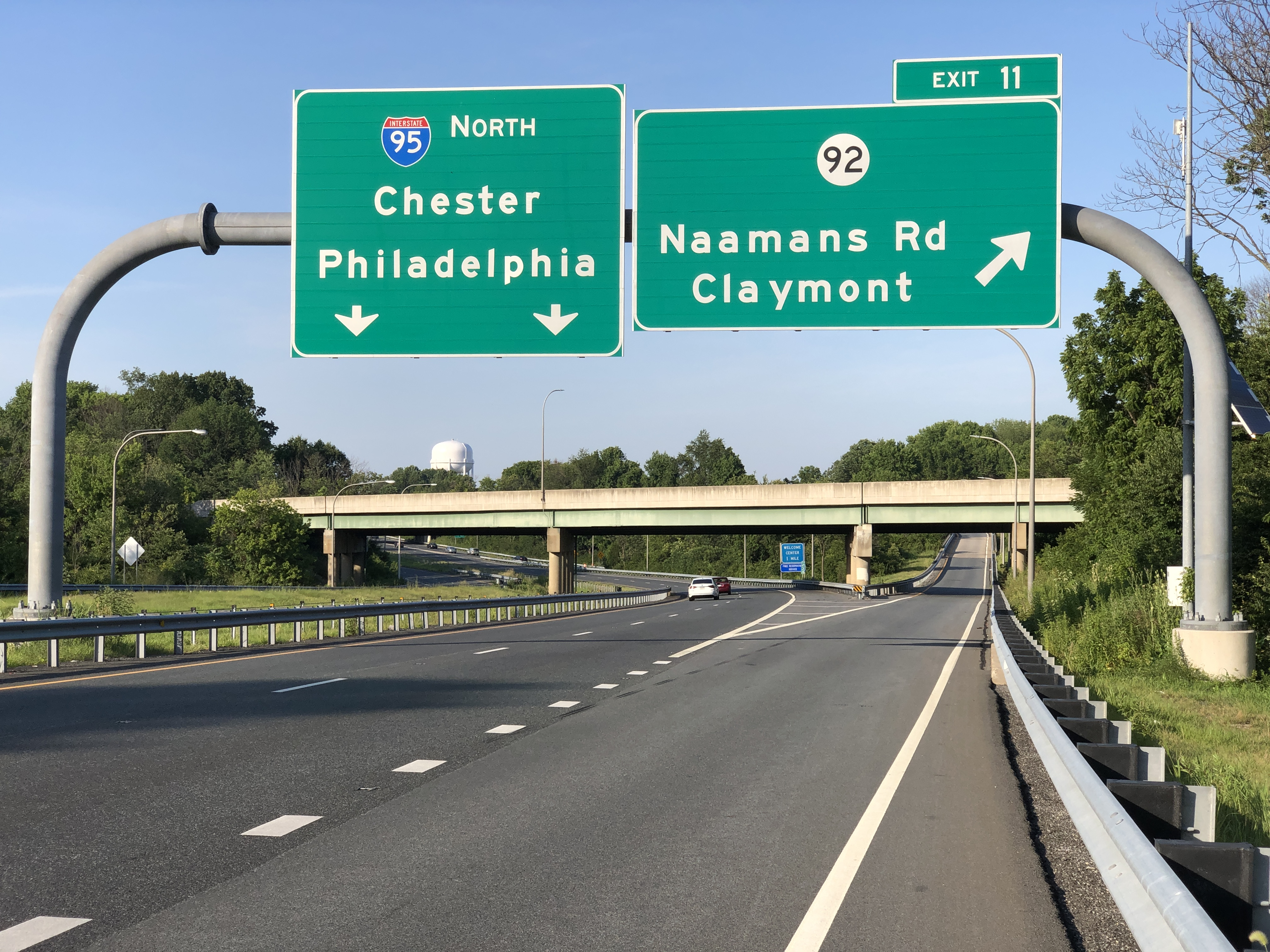
I-95 northbound at the DE 92 interchange in Claymont

Past US 202, I-95 leaves Wilmington for the suburban Brandywine Hundred area and continues northeast as a four-lane road, passing southeast of the Rock Manor Golf Club and running along the northwest side of the CSX Transportation line. The freeway heads across Matson Run before it curves east to pass over the railroad tracks. The roadway continues through wooded areas to the south of the CSX Transportation tracks, crossing Shellpot Creek and coming to a diamond interchange with DE 3 northwest of the town of Bellefonte. After this exit, I-95 and the rail line curve to the northeast and continue through woodland with nearby residential areas, passing northwest of Bellevue State Park and crossing Stoney Creek. The highway crosses Perkins Run before it reaches a northbound exit and southbound entrance with Harvey Road southeast of the villages of Arden, Ardentown, and Ardencroft. Past this interchange, the freeway curves east away from the CSX Transportation tracks and winds northeast near suburban neighborhoods in Claymont. In Claymont, the Interstate comes to a diamond interchange with DE 92, at which point I-495 also merges onto the northbound direction of the interstate via a southbound exit and northbound entrance. The southbound exit to DE 92 is via the I-495 interchange while all other ramps of the DE 92 interchange connect directly to I-95. Following the interchange, I-95 passes to the west of the former Tri-State Mall before it crosses the state line into Pennsylvania. The southbound exit from I-95 to I-495 is located in Pennsylvania, 132 feet (40 m) before the Delaware state line.

I-95 in Delaware has an annual average daily traffic count ranging from a high of 205,868 vehicles at the I-295 interchange near Newport to a low of 56,903 vehicles at the DE 92 interchange in Claymont. As part of the Interstate Highway System, the entire length of I-95 in Delaware is a part of the National Highway System, a network of roadways important to the country's economy, defense, and mobility.

== Tolls ==
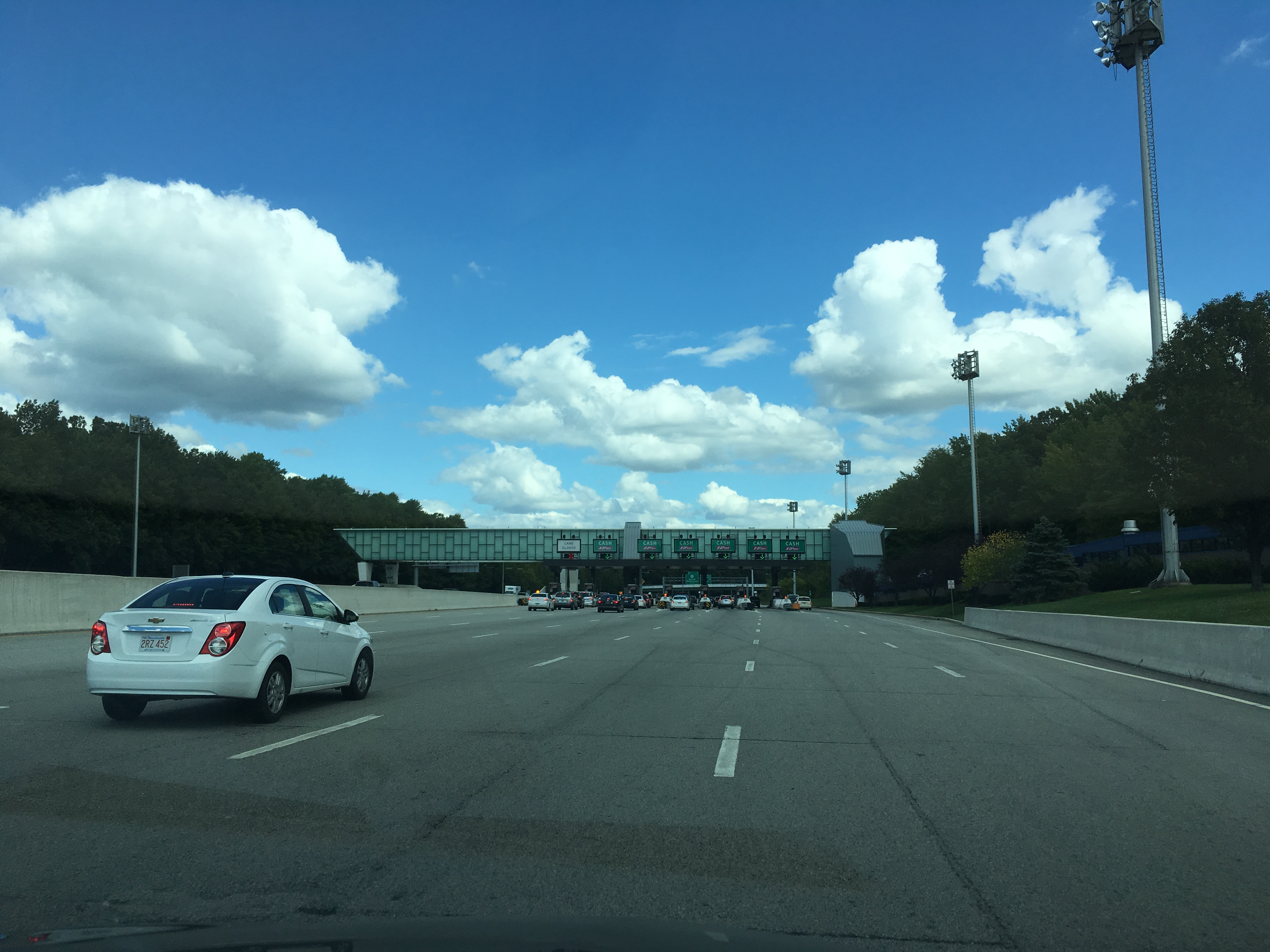
Newark mainline toll plaza

I-95 has a mainline toll plaza along the Delaware Turnpike near the Maryland state line in Newark. Cash or E-ZPass is accepted for payment of tolls. The plaza is staffed by toll collectors and also features high-speed E-ZPass lanes. The toll for passenger vehicles costs $5.00 both northbound and southbound.

When the highway first opened in 1963, the toll at the toll plaza near the state line was $0.30 (equivalent to $3.15 in 2025). Prior to 1976, ramp tolls were collected at the DE 896, DE 273, and DE 7 interchanges. The ramp tolls required exact change, and many motorists were caught by police evading the tolls because they did not have the proper change. In 1970, an attempt was made to use the honor system for motorists without the proper change at the tollbooth to pay the tolls by mailing them. However, it was discontinued after a month because most motorists did not mail in their tolls. In 1976, Governor Sherman W. Tribbitt signed House Bill 1278, which was sponsored by Representative Gerard A. Cain. This bill called for the elimination of the three ramp tolls while keeping the mainline toll plaza near the Maryland state line. The ramp tolls stopped being collected on October 1, 1976.

In 1981, plans were announced to demolish the former toll booths at the DE 273 and DE 7 interchanges; however, the DE 896 interchange toll booths were to remain to collect tolls from trucks. The mainline toll plaza was planned to be closed on July 1, 1981, after the bonds to construct the road were paid off, but was kept by "Operation Overhaul", a $93-million (equivalent to $278 million in 2025) project by Governor Pete du Pont that would use the tolls collected at the toll plaza to fund improvements to the turnpike along with other roads in the state of Delaware. In the middle of 2011, reconstruction of the Delaware Turnpike toll plaza was completed in a $32.6-million (equivalent to $46 million in 2025) project funded by the American Recovery and Reinvestment Act of 2009, adding high-speed E-ZPass lanes. On March 17, 2020, cash tolls were suspended at the mainline toll plaza along I-95 due to the COVID-19 pandemic, with all tolls collected electronically through the high-speed E-ZPass lanes and motorists without E-ZPass billed by mail; cash tolls resumed on May 21, 2020.

== Services ==
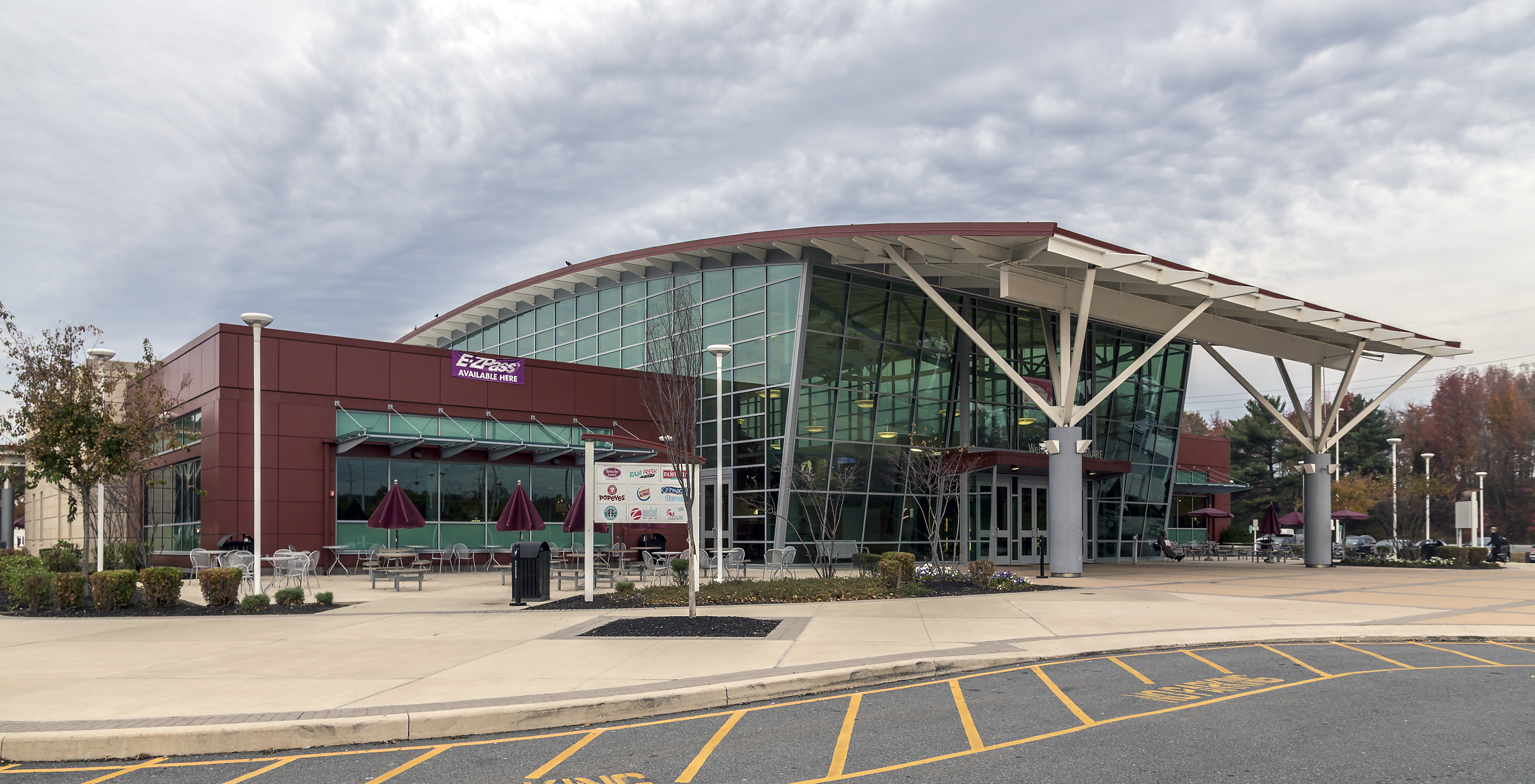
Biden Welcome Center

The Biden Welcome Center (formerly Delaware Welcome Center and also referred to as Delaware House) service plaza is located in the median of I-95 between the DE 896 and DE 273 interchanges east of Newark, with access from both directions of the highway. The service plaza offers a Sunoco gas station, electric vehicle charging stations, a convenience store, multiple fast-food restaurants, a visitor center, and retail options including a store called Postcards from Delaware that sells Delaware-related merchandise. There is also a Tesla Supercharger station at the welcome center. The welcome center is run by Applegreen.

When the Delaware Turnpike opened in 1963, a Hot Shoppes restaurant and an Esso service station were located along the road in the median. In 1964, a proposal was made to build a truck stop and motel next to the existing facilities. The truck stop proposal was off and on for several years until a truck stop was built just across the state line in Maryland in 1975. In 1983, Hot Shoppes was replaced by Roy Rogers and Bob's Big Boy in order to offer both sit-down dining and fast food. This was the largest Roy Rogers and Bob's Big Boy location at the time and restaurant namesake Roy Rogers and Lieutenant Governor Mike Castle were in attendance for the opening. In September 2009, the welcome center was closed for a reconstruction project that built a new service plaza building, new gas pumps, new truck parking, and an improved visitor center. The renovated service plaza opened in June 2010 at a cost of $35 million (equivalent to $50.4 million in 2025).

On September 17, 2018, the service plaza was renamed the Biden Welcome Center in honor of the Biden family, a Delaware political family that includes US senator, 47th vice president, and subsequently 46th president, Joe Biden. A renaming ceremony was held, with Governor John Carney and members of the Biden family (including Joe Biden) in attendance. At the ceremony, Carney signed a bill formally renaming the service plaza.

== History ==
=== Planning and construction ===
In 1948, the Wilmington Transportation Study proposed two new roads running between the southern end of Wilmington and the Pennsylvania state line to improve traffic flow in the Wilmington area. Route A followed the current alignment of I-95 while Route B bypassed the city to the east along the current alignment of I-495. Plans for building Route A were made in 1950 but were deferred a year later due to opposition.

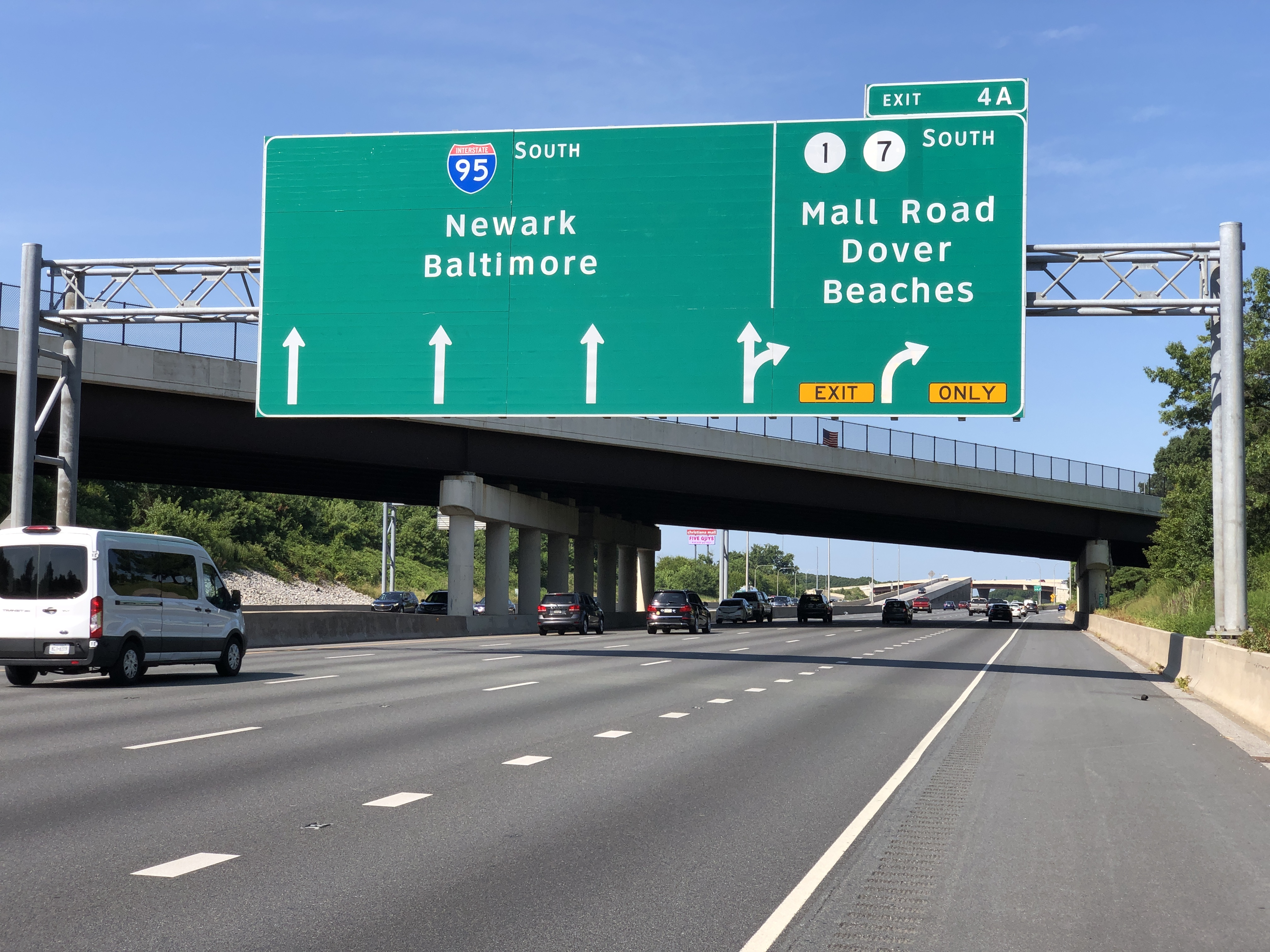
I-95 southbound at the DE 1/DE 7 interchange in Christiana

Following the completion of the Delaware Memorial Bridge connecting to the New Jersey Turnpike in 1951, through traffic coming from the bridge led to significant congestion on US 13 and US 40. As a result of this, suggestions were made in 1954 for a limited-access road to be constructed leading to the bridge that would alleviate congestion on US 40. In 1956, the Interstate Highway System was created, with two routes proposed along the current alignment of I-95. FAI-1 was proposed to run from the Maryland state line east to an interchange west of Farnhurst while FAI-2 was proposed between this interchange and the Pennsylvania state line through the western part of Wilmington. The corridor following FAI-1 and FAI-2 would become designated as part of I-95, an Interstate Highway running along the East Coast of the US. FAI-1 was originally planned as a free Interstate Highway using federal funds; however, the road would not have been completed until 1967 under this plan. As a result, the state of Delaware financed the road with bond issues and would build it as a toll road called the Delaware Turnpike.

The first construction contracts for the Delaware Turnpike were awarded in 1957, with construction soon following that year. Construction began on building a new bridge over US 13/US 40 at the Farnhurst interchange in 1958 that would connect the Delaware Turnpike to the I-295/US 40 approach to the Delaware Memorial Bridge. The same year, plans were made for several bridges along I-95. In 1959, work began on rebuilding the Farnhurst interchange to Interstate Highway standards. The same year, recommendations were made for the design and right-of-way acquisition along the planned route of I-95 as well as the construction of several contracts between the Maryland state line and Farnhurst along the Delaware Turnpike, including the interchange with DE 41/DE 141 and between I-95, I-295, and I-495 near the Christina River. The proposed routing for I-95 through Wilmington would take it through the central core between Adams and Jackson streets. Locals tried to fight routing I-95 through the central core and instead suggested routing it along Bancroft Parkway to the west or the present-day route of I-495 to the east. However, the lame-duck Republican-controlled city council approved routing I-95 along Adams and Jackson streets in 1957. The demolition of homes began in January 1959.

A year later, construction began on overpasses and ramps at the Farnhurst interchange. The same year, suggestions were made to build I-95 across the Christina Marsh as well as construct the bridges over the Christina River and the Pennsylvania Railroad in Wilmington. A contract was awarded for the Christina River interchange in 1961. By 1961, all construction contracts along the Delaware Turnpike had been completed except for the DE 41/DE 141 interchange and the Christina River interchange. In 1962, the I-95 bridges over the Christina River, the Pennsylvania Railroad, and Little Mill Creek were finished while plans were made for the South Wilmington Viaduct that would cross over several railroad tracks belonging to the Pennsylvania, Baltimore and Ohio, and Reading railroads. The same year, the roadway was built between the Christina River interchange and the South Wilmington Viaduct. The new northbound lanes of DE 41/DE 141 through the I-95 interchange opened in November 1962. The southbound lanes of DE 41/DE 141 opened in June 1964, enabling directional flow of DE 41/DE 141 through the interchange. In September 1963, construction work on the turnpike was halted by picketing workers.

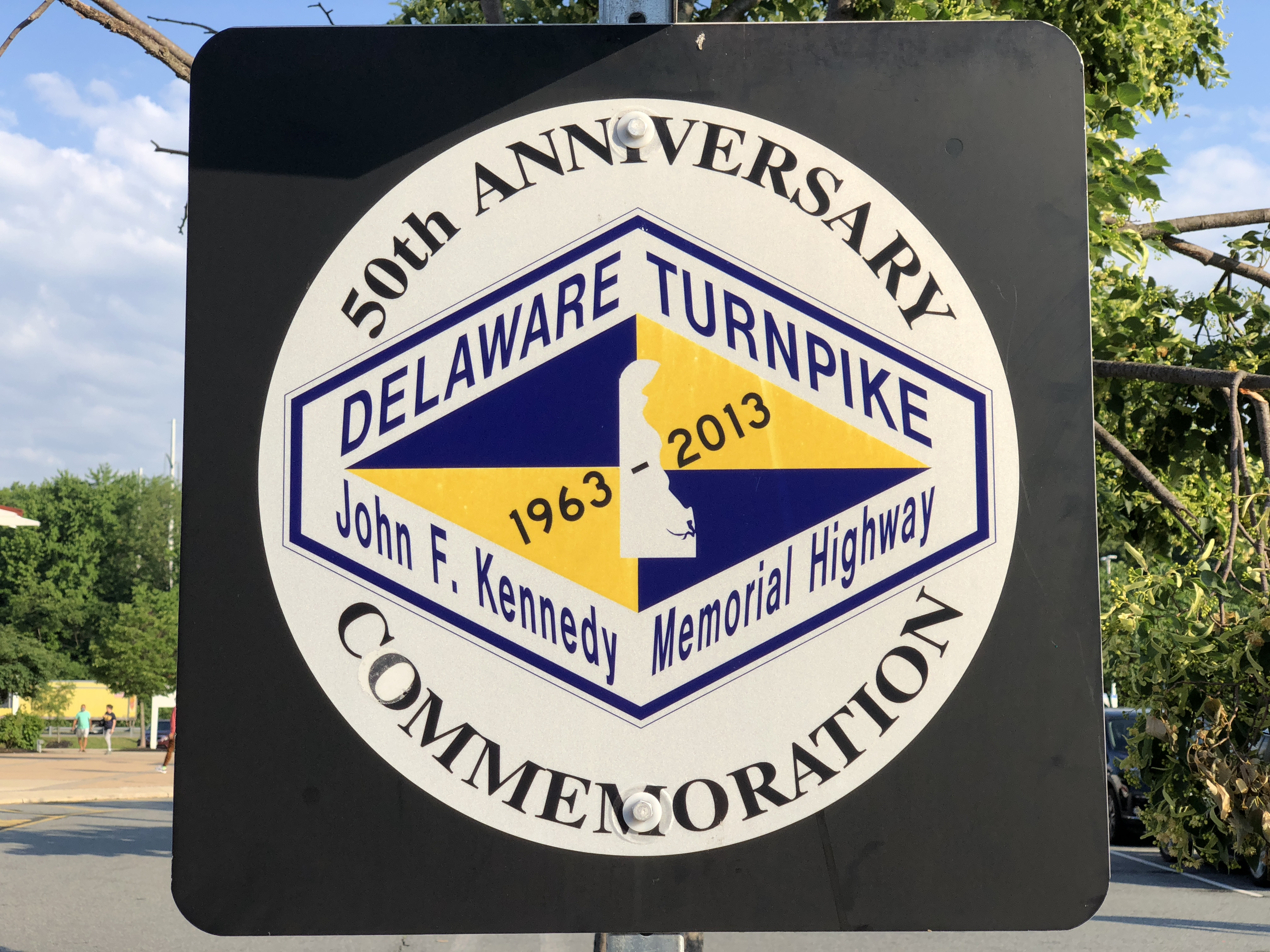
Sign at the Biden Welcome Center commemorating the 50th anniversary of the Delaware Turnpike in 2013

The Delaware Turnpike, along with the connecting Northeast Expressway in Maryland, was dedicated by President John F. Kennedy, Delaware Governor Elbert N. Carvel, and Maryland Governor J. Millard Tawes in a ceremony at the state line on November 14, 1963, in which a ribbon-cutting took place and a replica Mason–Dixon line crownstone was unveiled. The Delaware Turnpike was opened to traffic at midnight on November 15, 1963. The first motorist to pay a toll on the turnpike was Omero C. Catan, also known as "Mr. First", of Teaneck, New Jersey, who marked this occasion as the 517th first moment he achieved. The completion of the Delaware Turnpike allowed motorists to travel from Washington, D.C. to Boston without having to stop at a traffic light. Construction of the Delaware Turnpike cost $30 million (equivalent to $241 million in 2025). Following the opening of the turnpike, traffic levels on US 40 and US 301 fell by 40 to 50 percent. The rerouting of traffic to the Delaware Turnpike led to the reduction in profits for businesses along US 13 and US 40, with several businesses forced to close. Meanwhile, the Delaware Turnpike saw more traffic volume than originally projected. Eight days after dedicating the toll road, President Kennedy was assassinated in Dallas. As a result, both the Delaware Turnpike and the Northeast Expressway were renamed the John F. Kennedy Memorial Highway in his honor in December 1963. On the one-year anniversary of the dedication of the Delaware Turnpike on November 14, 1964, a memorial service and wreath laying in honor of Kennedy was held at the state line, with Governor Carvel in attendance.

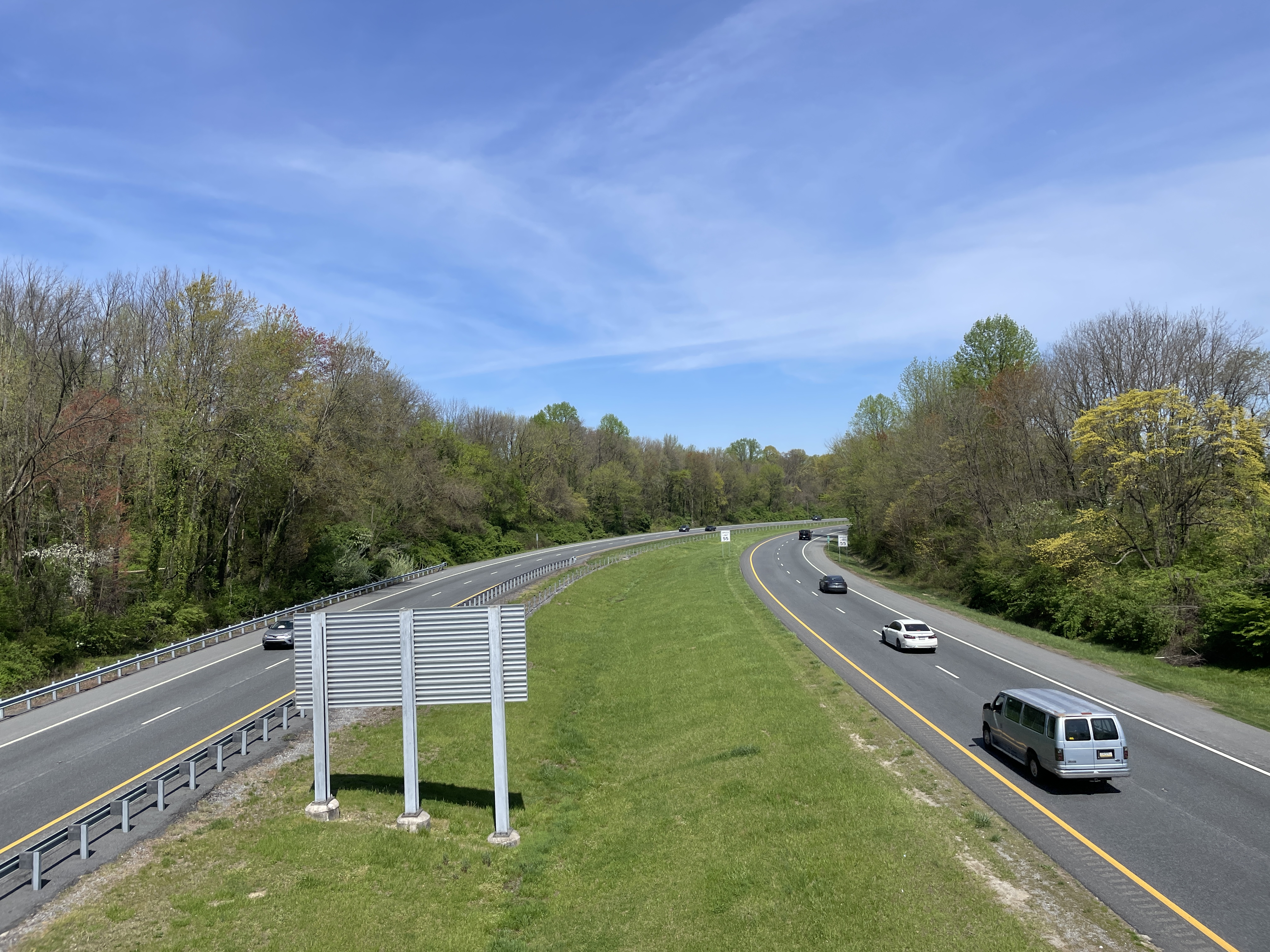
I-95 northbound past the Harvey Road interchange in Claymont

The remainder of I-95 between the Christina River interchange and the Pennsylvania state line was built as a non-tolled freeway. In April 1964, construction contracts were awarded for bridges at the Christina River interchange that would carry I-95 and I-495 traffic over I-295. In mid-1964, construction on the South Wilmington Viaduct began. In June of that year, the substructure of the I-95 bridge over the Brandywine Creek was completed. In August 1964, construction began on the I-95 interchange with Naamans Road and the northern terminus of I-495 in Claymont. In 1965, construction was underway to build the below-surface alignment of I-95 between Fourth Street and the Brandywine Creek in Wilmington. The construction of I-95 through Wilmington resulted in the demolition of 360 to 370 homes in the West Side neighborhood between Adams and Jackson streets. The construction of the highway led to the decline of the residential and commercial base in Wilmington. Work was also underway on the portion of I-95 northeast of Wilmington, which would parallel the Baltimore and Ohio Railroad. In 1966, I-95 was completed and opened to traffic between the Christina River interchange with I-295 and I-495 and downtown Wilmington, where ramps connected the highway to Maryland and Lancaster avenues. The completion of this section of I-95 provided an uninterrupted freeway connection between Wilmington and Baltimore. The ramps to downtown Wilmington were added as a compromise of building the freeway through the city and would bring economic development to the Wilmington Riverfront. In August 1968, I-95 between the South Wilmington Viaduct and US 202 was completed and opened to traffic. On November 1, 1968, the freeway was opened between US 202 and the Pennsylvania state line. With this, the entire length of I-95 in Delaware was constructed, making Delaware the third state to complete its section of I-95.

=== Improvements ===
Interstate 895
- Location: Newport–Claymont
- Length: 10.78 mi (17.35 km)
- Existed: 1979–1980

In November 1968, work began to widen the Delaware Turnpike from four to six lanes to handle increasing traffic volumes. The widening project was completed in December 1969, one year ahead of schedule. In 1969, a plan was made to widen the turnpike between DE 896 and DE 273 to 10 lanes and between DE 273 and DE 141 to 12 lanes in a 3–3–3–3 local–express lane configuration. This was later scaled down to a proposal to widen the road to eight lanes total. The widening of the Delaware Turnpike to eight lanes occurred in the 1980s. From 1971 to 1978, a north–south extension of the Delaware Turnpike running south to Dover was studied. This extension of the turnpike evolved into a "Relief Route" for US 13 and was built as DE 1 between 1987 and 2003.

On June 28, 1978, the American Association of State Highway and Transportation Officials (AASHTO) approved rerouting I-95 along the I-495 alignment. However, AASHTO disapproved renumbering the alignment of I-95 through Wilmington as I-595. On October 27 of that year, AASHTO gave conditional approval for I-95 through Wilmington to be designated as I-195 from I-95 near Newport north to US 202 while the route from US 202 north to I-95 in Claymont would become I-395. I-895 was designated along the conditionally approved route of I-195 and I-395 on June 25, 1979. In 1980, the South Wilmington Viaduct was reconstructed. On November 14, 1980, I-95 and I-495 were returned to their original alignments, with I-895 decommissioned. US 202 was designated concurrent with I-95 through Wilmington in 1984.

In 2000, I-95 was completely rebuilt between US 202/DE 202 and the Pennsylvania state line. The reconstruction completely tore apart the concrete pavement and replaced it with asphalt and also improved drainage and rebuilt bridges. In April 2000, the southbound lanes were closed, with the lanes between DE 3 and US 202/DE 202 reopening in May and the remainder reopening soon after. In July, the northbound lanes were closed, with the lanes reopening between US 202/DE 202 and DE 3 in September and the remainder reopening in October. During the closure, through traffic was detoured to I-495.

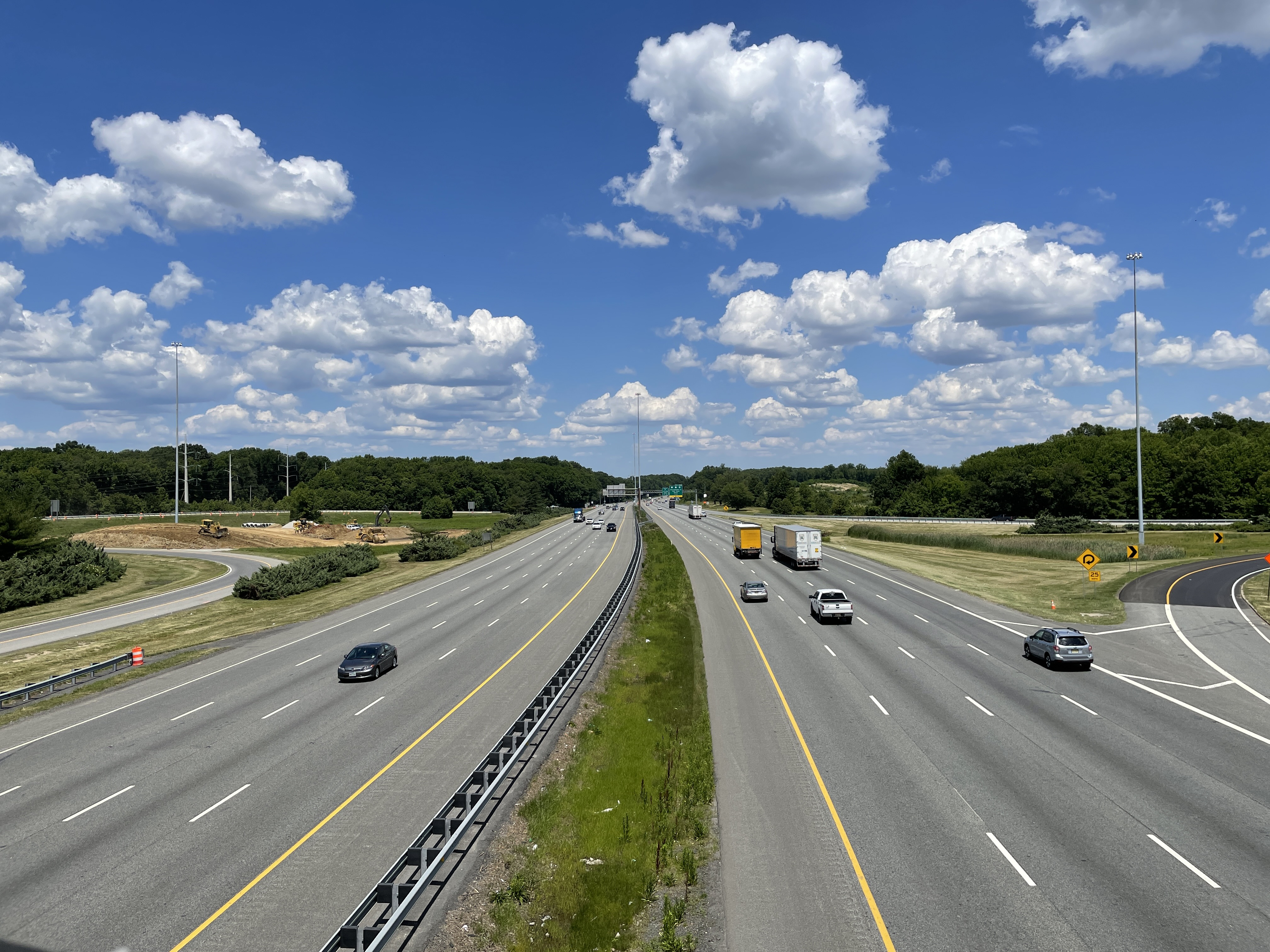
I-95 northbound at the DE 273 interchange near Christiana

In 2003, construction began on a new bridge carrying DE 58 over I-95 to replace the previous bridge, which was over 40 years old and experienced deterioration. Construction of the new bridge, which cost $17 million (equivalent to $26.1 million in 2025), was originally planned to be finished in late 2005 but completion was delayed to late 2006. The new bridge carrying DE 58 over I-95 was built to accommodate future widening of I-95. In May 2007, construction began to widen I-95 between the DE 1/DE 7 and US 202/DE 141 interchanges from eight to ten lanes due to rising traffic levels and increased development. The widening project was completed in November 2008. Traffic congestion at the cloverleaf interchange with DE 1/DE 7 in Christiana led to the Delaware Department of Transportation (DelDOT) to improve the interchange. The project included adding flyover connecting ramps from northbound DE 1 to northbound I-95 and from southbound I-95 to southbound DE 1 which allowed for easier merging patterns and the elimination of lengthy backups on the former ramp design. Construction of a new "ring access road" around Christiana Mall began in February 2011 and was completed in March 2012, with a newly built bridge over DE 1, just south of the I-95 interchange. The ramp from southbound I-95 to southbound DE 1/DE 7 opened on August 27, 2013, and the ramp from northbound DE 1/DE 7 to northbound I-95 opened on October 17, 2013, with a ribbon-cutting ceremony attended by Governor Jack Markell and DelDOT Secretary Shailen Bhatt.

In December 2011, a project began to improve the interchange between I-95 and US 202/DE 202 in order to reduce congestion. The project widened the ramp between northbound I-95 and northbound US 202 to two lanes, the ramp between southbound US 202 and southbound I-95 was extended to modern standards, and the ramp between southbound I-95 and southbound DE 202 was relocated from a cloverleaf loop to a directional ramp that intersects DE 202 at a signalized intersection. In addition, the interchange ramps were repaved and bridges were rehabilitated. The project was finished in July 2015, months behind schedule due to the closure of I-495 in 2014. On August 7, 2015, a dedication ceremony to mark the completion of the project was held, with Governor Markell, Senator Tom Carper, and DelDOT Secretary Jennifer Cohan in attendance. The project, which cost over $33 million (equivalent to $43.7 million in 2025), was 80-percent funded by the federal government.

On June 2, 2014, the I-495 bridge over the Christina River was closed after it was discovered that four support columns were tilting. During this closure, traffic from I-495 was detoured onto I-95, and several major roads in the Wilmington area experienced increased traffic congestion. The southbound lanes of I-495 reopened on July 31, a month earlier than expected, and the northbound lanes of I-495 reopened on August 23.

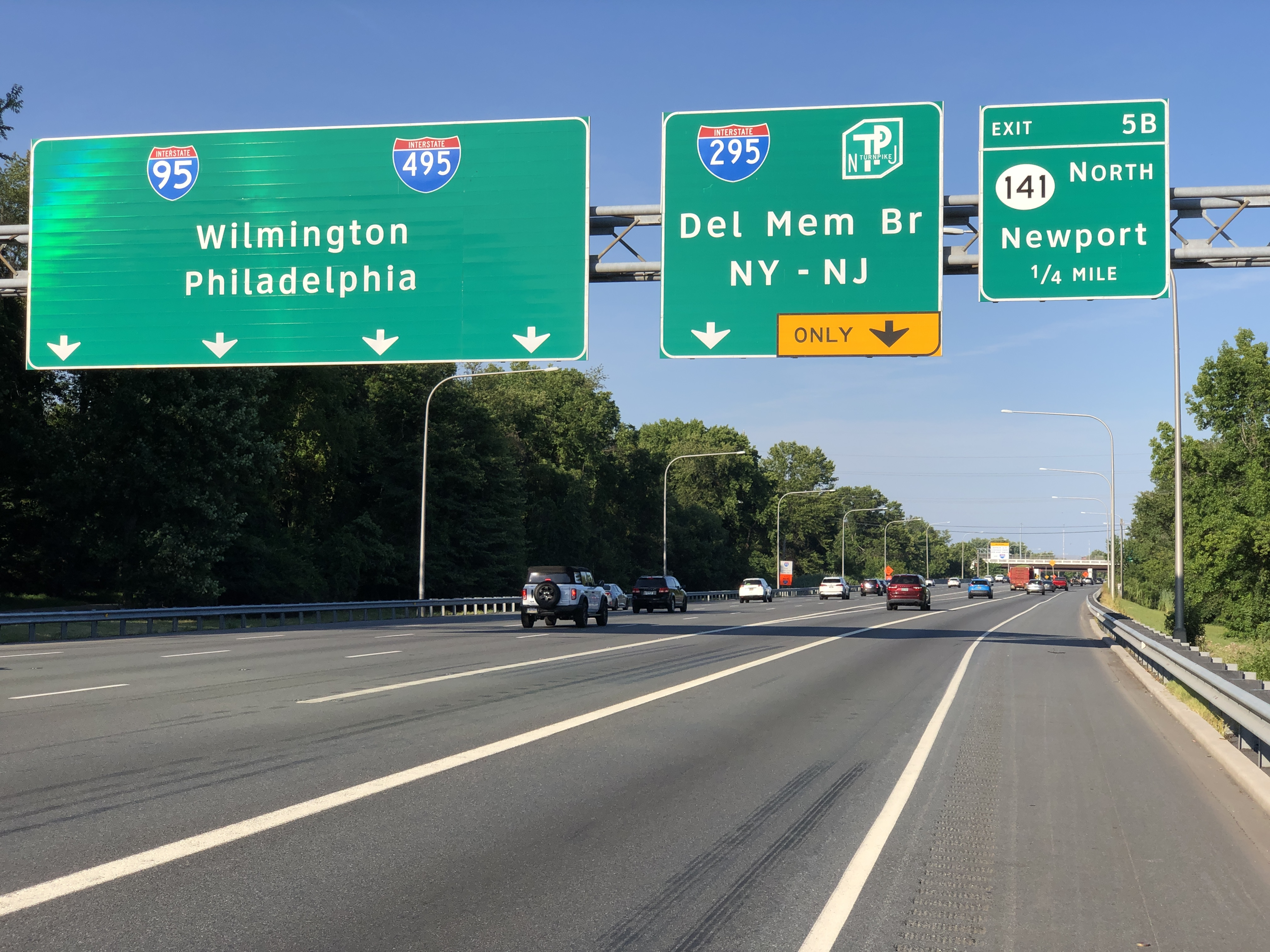
I-95 northbound at split with I-295 northbound near Newport

In 2016, a project began to improve the interchange with DE 141. The project reconstructed the bridges that carry DE 141 over I-95 and added safety improvements to the interchange ramps. In June 2016, the ramp from northbound I-95 to northbound DE 141 closed until June 2017 to allow for reconstruction of the bridge along northbound DE 141. Construction on improving the interchange along with the adjacent section of DE 141 was completed in December 2021.

DelDOT completely rebuilt I-95 from the southern end of I-495 to the Brandywine Creek bridge in Wilmington in a $200-million project beginning in February 2021. Several overpasses were repaired and new guardrails were installed. The southbound entrance ramp from South Jackson Street was demolished and the entrance from 2nd Street was rebuilt. At times during construction, the highway was reduced to two lanes of traffic. Construction was finished in November 2022, months ahead of schedule. On April 6, 2023, a ceremony marking the completion of the project was held, with Governor Carney, Senators Carper and Chris Coons, Representative Lisa Blunt Rochester, Wilmington Mayor Mike Purzycki, and DelDOT Secretary Nicole Majeski in attendance.

On March 15, 2021, a construction project began that will improve the DE 273 interchange by realigning ramps and widening DE 273 through the interchange. Construction on this interchange improvement is planned to be completed in 2023. There are plans to reconstruct the interchange with DE 896 by adding two flyovers and realigning ramps in order to improve safety and congestion at the interchange. A groundbreaking ceremony was held on May 1, 2023, with Governor Carney, Senator Carper, Representative Blunt Rochester, and DelDOT Secretary Majeski in attendance. The reconstruction project, which is projected to cost $143 million, began on May 7, 2023, and is planned to be completed in 2026. The project received a $57-million grant from the US Department of Transportation which allowed construction to begin earlier than originally planned.

In March 2021, a group of state lawmakers led by Representative Sherry Dorsey Walker pushed for US Secretary of Transportation Pete Buttigieg, and, by proxy, President Joe Biden, to endorse a plan to add a freeway lid on top of I-95 through Wilmington and construct an urban park on top of the highway, reuniting neighborhoods that were divided when the highway was constructed. In April 2021, Wilmington city council unanimously approved backing the plan for constructing an urban park over I-95 through the city.

== Exit list ==
The entire route is in New Castle County.

Location	mi	km	Exit	Destinations	Notes
Newark	0.00	0.00	–	I-95 south (John F. Kennedy Memorial Highway) – Baltimore	Continuation into Maryland
Newark	0.54	0.87	Newark Toll Plaza		
Newark	2.34	3.77	1	DE 896 – Newark, Middletown	Signed as exits 1A (DE 896 south) and 1B (DE 896 north) southbound; last southbound exit before toll; access to University of Delaware
Newark	5.10	8.21	Biden Welcome Center		
Christiana	6.63	10.67	3	DE 273 – Newark, Christiana, Dover	Signed as exits 3A (DE 273 east) and 3B (DE 273 west) northbound; signed for Christiana southbound, Dover northbound
Christiana	7.89– 8.13	12.70– 13.08	4	DE 1 south / DE 7 / DE 58 / Mall Road – Christiana, Dover, Churchmans Crossing, Beaches	Signed as exits 4A (DE 1 south / DE 7 south) and 4B (DE 7 north / DE 58); northern terminus and exit 165C on DE 1; exits 165B and 165A on DE 7
Newport	10.56– 11.75	16.99– 18.91	5A	US 202 south / DE 141 to US 13 – New Castle, Newport	Signed as exits 5A (DE 141 south) and 5B (DE 141 north); southern end of US 202 concurrency; no northbound access to DE 141 north; US 202/US 13 not signed northbound
Newport	11.75	18.91	–	I-295 north / DE 141 north to N.J. Turnpike north (US 40) – Delaware Memorial Bridge, New Jersey, New York, Newport	Northbound exit and southbound entrance; southern terminus of I-295
Newport	12.65	20.36	–	I-495 north – Port of Wilmington, Philadelphia	Northbound exit and southbound entrance; southern terminus of I-495
Newport	12.65	20.36	Transition between Delaware Turnpike and Wilmington Expressway		
Newport	13.34	21.47	5C	I-295 north – Delaware Memorial Bridge, New Castle	Southbound exit and northbound entrance; southern terminus of I-295
Wilmington	14.78	23.79	6	DE 4 (Maryland Avenue) / Martin Luther King Jr. Boulevard (DE 48)	No southbound exit; to DE 9; access to Wilmington station and Wilmington Riverfront
Wilmington	15.45	24.86	6	DE 9 (Fourth Street) / Martin Luther King Jr. Boulevard (DE 48)	Southbound exit and entrance; to DE 4; access to Wilmington station
Wilmington	15.68	25.23	7	DE 52 (Delaware Avenue)	Signed as exits 7A (DE 52 south) and 7B (DE 52 north) southbound; access to Downtown Wilmington and Brandywine Valley Attractions
Wilmington	16.97	27.31	8	US 202 north (Concord Pike) / DE 202 south – Wilmington, West Chester	Northern end of US 202 concurrency; DE 202 not signed
Bellefonte	19.12	30.77	9	DE 3 (Marsh Road)	Access to Bellevue State Park
Claymont	21.30	34.28	10	Harvey Road	Northbound exit and southbound entrance
Claymont	23.10– 23.43	37.18– 37.71	11	DE 92 (Naamans Road) – Claymont	No southbound exit
Claymont	23.10– 23.43	37.18– 37.71	11	I-495 south / DE 92 – Port of Wilmington, Baltimore	Southbound exit and northbound entrance; northern terminus of I-495; DE 92 not signed; exit number not signed
Claymont	23.43	37.71	–	I-95 north (Delaware Expressway) – Chester, Philadelphia	Continuation into Pennsylvania
1.000 mi = 1.609 km; 1.000 km = 0.621 mi: Concurrency terminus; Incomplete access; Tolled

== Auxiliary routes ==
I-95 has two auxiliary routes that are located within the state of Delaware. I-295 runs from I-95 near Newport east (north) to the Delaware Memorial Bridge, where it crosses the Delaware River into New Jersey. Once in New Jersey, I-295 intersects the southern terminus of the New Jersey Turnpike and continues northeast a bypass route of Philadelphia parallel to the New Jersey Turnpike. I-295 loops to the north of Trenton, and enters Pennsylvania, heading south (west) and reaching its terminus at I-95 in Bristol Township. I-495 is a bypass of Wilmington to the east. I-495 heads north from I-95 south of Wilmington near Newport, passing the Port of Wilmington and running along the Delaware River, before merging back in with I-95 just before the Pennsylvania state line in Claymont.

== See also ==
Interstate 95
Previous state: Maryland	Delaware	Next state: Pennsylvania
