= DE37 =

DE37 may refer to:

- Delaware Route 37
- ROCS Shou Shan (DE-37)
- USS Greiner (DE-37)
