= Delaware Route 4 =

Highway in Delaware

Delaware Route 4
- DE 4 highlighted in red

Route information
- Maintained by DelDOT
- Length: 14.08 mi (22.66 km)
- Existed: 1967–present
- Tourist routes: Washington–Rochambeau Revolutionary Route

Major junctions
- West end: DE 279 / DE 896 in Newark
- DE 72 in Newark; DE 273 in Ogletown; DE 58 in Christiana; DE 7 in Stanton; DE 141 in Newport; DE 62 near Newport; DE 100 near Elsmere; I-95 / US 202 in Wilmington
- East end: DE 48 in Wilmington

Location
- Country: United States
- State: Delaware
- Counties: New Castle

Highway system
- Delaware State Route System; List; Byways
← DE 3	→ DE 5

Delaware Route 4 (DE 4) is a state highway in New Castle County, Delaware. The route runs from DE 279 and DE 896 in Newark east to DE 48 in downtown Wilmington. The route passes through suburban areas in northern New Castle County between Newark and Wilmington, intersecting DE 72 in the eastern part of Newark, DE 273 in Ogletown, DE 58 in Christiana, DE 7 in Stanton, DE 141 in Newport, DE 62 and DE 100 between Newport and Wilmington, and Interstate 95 (I-95)/U.S. Route 202 (US 202) in Wilmington. DE 4 is a four-lane road for much of its length.

What is now DE 4 was originally a county road that was paved in the 1930s. DE 4 was designated in the 1960s to run from the Maryland border along Chestnut Hill Road near Newark east to DE 48 in Wilmington. Between 1971 and 1981, the route extended northeast past DE 48 along Washington Street and Washington Street Extension to US 13 Business (US 13 Bus.) in Bellefonte. In the 1980s, the western terminus of DE 4 was realigned from Chestnut Hill Road to the newly-built Christiana Parkway, terminating at DE 2 (now DE 279) and DE 896.

== Route description ==
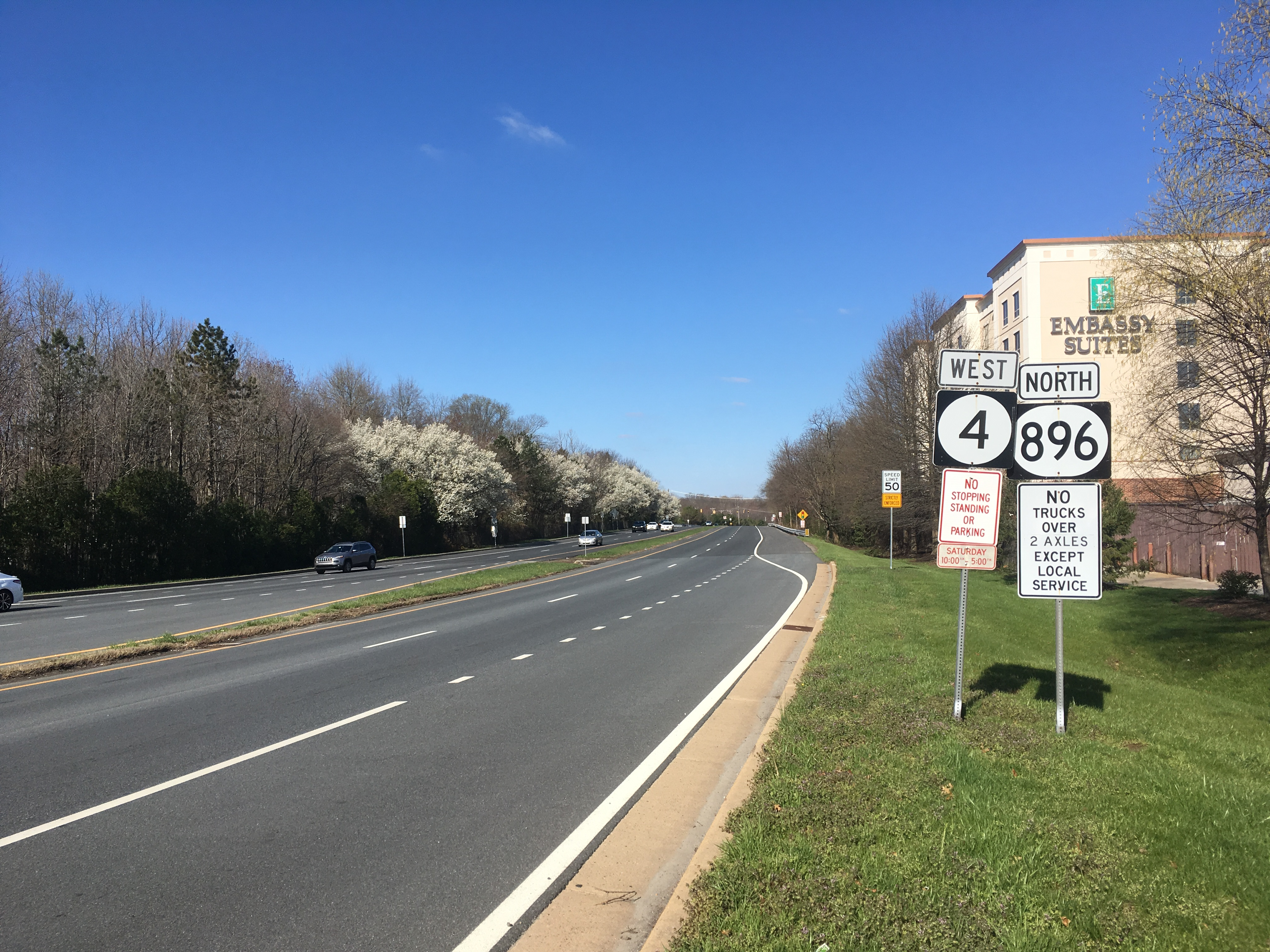
DE 4 westbound and DE 896 northbound on the Christiana Parkway past South College Avenue in Newark

DE 4 begins at an intersection with Elkton Road in the city of Newark, which heads southwest as DE 279 and northeast as DE 896. From here the route heads southeast concurrent with DE 896 on the three-lane undivided Christiana Parkway, carrying two eastbound lanes and one westbound lane. The road runs through wooded areas and passes over the Christina River before it comes to a bridge over Amtrak's Northeast Corridor railroad line. The roadway curves east and widens into a four-lane divided highway as it passes to the south of the University of Delaware's Science, Technology, and Advanced Research campus.

At the intersection with South College Avenue, DE 896 splits to the south. A park and ride lot is located at the southeast corner of this intersection. DE 4 continues east near Delaware Stadium and the Bob Carpenter Center on the University of Delaware campus to the north, intersecting Chestnut Hill Road. At this point the road becomes Chestnut Hill Road and runs between farmland to the north and residential neighborhoods to the south as it comes to a grade crossing of Norfolk Southern's Delmarva Secondary railroad line. The road heads into commercial areas and intersects DE 72, with a park and ride lot situated southeast of the intersection.

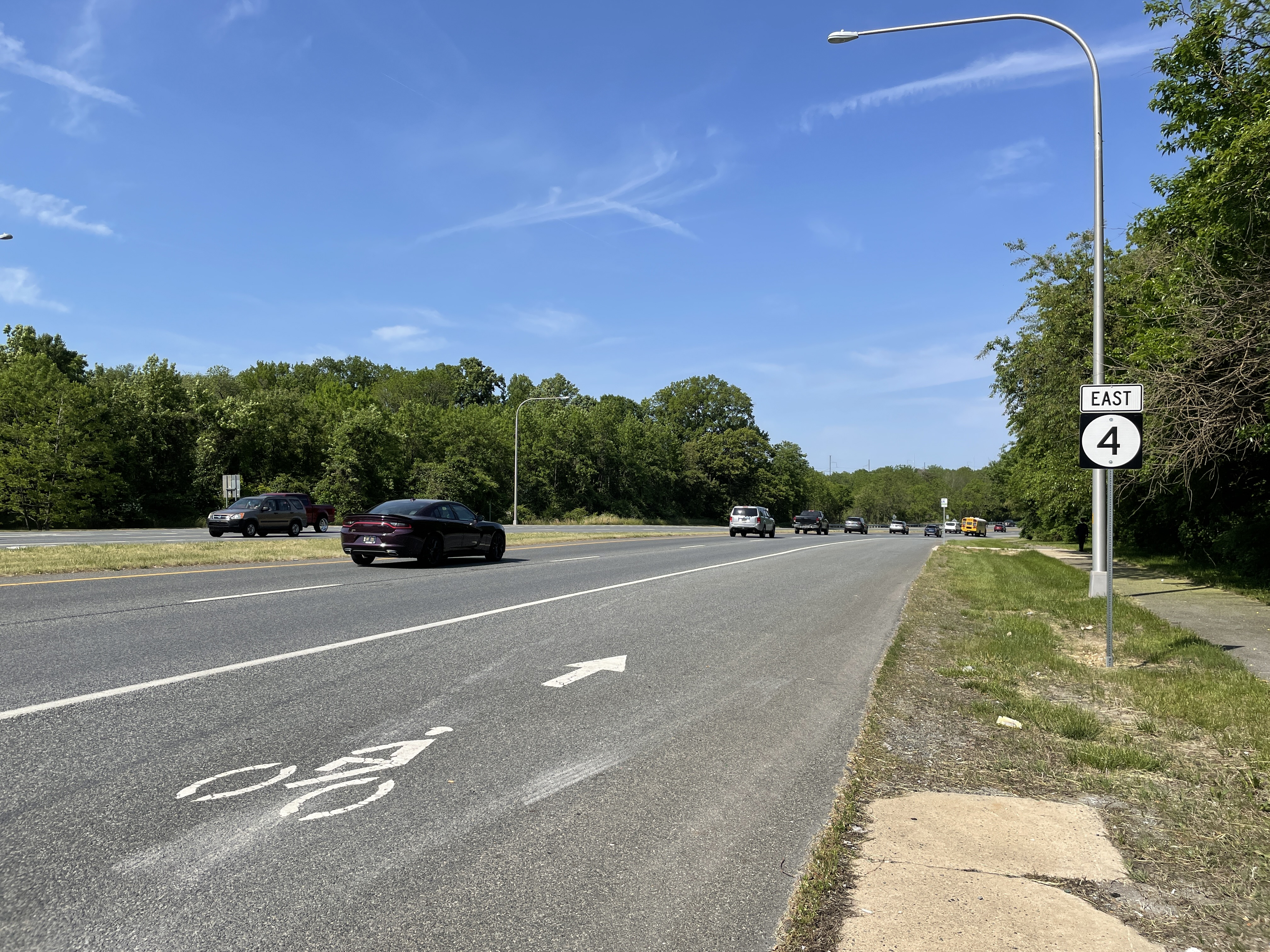
DE 4 eastbound past DE 58 near Christiana

Past this intersection, DE 4 leaves Newark and continues east along Chestnut Hill Road. The road heads into suburban Brookside, running through residential neighborhoods with some businesses and curving to the northeast. The route continues to the community of Ogletown and passes to the southeast of the Delaware School for the Deaf before it has an intersection with Salem Church Road and an interchange with DE 273. At this point, the name changes to Ogletown Stanton Road. Following this, the road heads into Christiana and passes to the north of Christiana Hospital. Beyond the hospital, DE 4 comes to an intersection with the western terminus of DE 58 and Delaware Park Boulevard, the latter of which is an access road to Delaware Park – which consists of a Thoroughbred horse racetrack, casino, and golf course – and the Churchmans Crossing station on SEPTA's Wilmington/Newark Line that runs along the Northeast Corridor. The route continues through commercial areas with some woods and curves east to reach an intersection with DE 7.

At this point, DE 4 turns north for a concurrency with DE 7 on the six-lane divided Stanton Christiana Road, running through wooded areas with nearby development, including the Hale-Byrnes House, and passing over Amtrak's Northeast Corridor railroad line and the White Clay Creek and Mill Creek near their confluence. The road passes to the east of Delaware Park, with access provided by Delaware Park Boulevard, and curves northeast into Stanton. At this point, the two routes head into a commercial area and split into the one-way pair of Mitch Road eastbound and Main Street westbound. DE 7 splits from DE 4 by heading northwest on Limestone Road. DE 4 continues east along the one-way pair past homes and businesses with two lanes in each direction, crossing Red Clay Creek. The directions of the route rejoin and the route becomes four-lane divided West Newport Pike, heading through suburban areas and crossing Hershey Run before running through the community of Silview. DE 4 enters the town of Newport and splits into the one-way pair of West Market Street eastbound and West Justis Street westbound. The route has an interchange with the DE 141 freeway and the one-way pair becomes East Market Street eastbound and East Justis Street westbound.

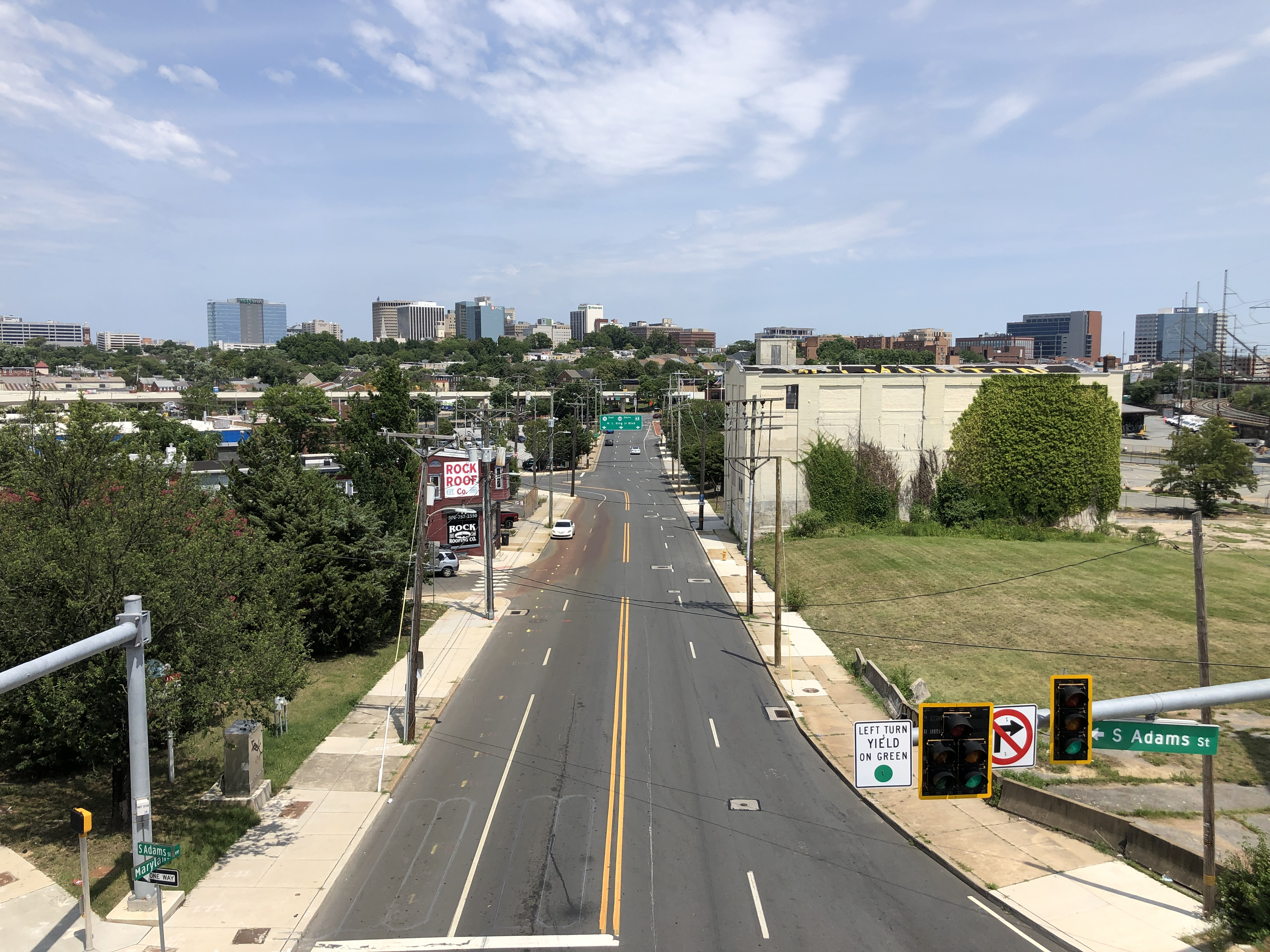
View eastbound along DE 4 from I-95/US 202 in Wilmington

The two directions of DE 4 rejoin and the route continues northeast as four-lane undivided East Newport Pike. The road leaves Newport and heads between suburban neighborhoods to the northwest and Banning Park to the southeast. The route intersects DE 62 and becomes Maryland Avenue, passing a mix of homes and businesses. The road comes to an intersection with the southern terminus of DE 100, which is routed on the one-way pair of Race Street northbound and South Dupont Road southbound. Past this, the route heads across Little Mill Creek and passes north of a park and ride lot before crossing CSX's Market Street Industrial Track railroad line at-grade. DE 4 continues into the city of Wilmington and runs past rowhouses and businesses. The route passes under I-95/US 202 and comes to a ramp from northbound I-95/US 202. Past this, DE 4 enters downtown Wilmington and splits into the one-way pair of Maryland Avenue eastbound and South Monroe Street westbound before ending at DE 48, which is routed on the one-way pair of Martin Luther King Jr. Boulevard eastbound and West Second Street westbound.

The section of DE 4 between Harmony Road near Christiana and Jackson Street in Wilmington is part of the Washington–Rochambeau Revolutionary Route, a National Historic Trail. DE 4 has an annual average daily traffic count ranging from a high of 53,651 vehicles at the east end of the DE 7 concurrency to a low of 12,723 vehicles at the eastern terminus at DE 48. The entire length of DE 4 is part of the National Highway System.

== History ==
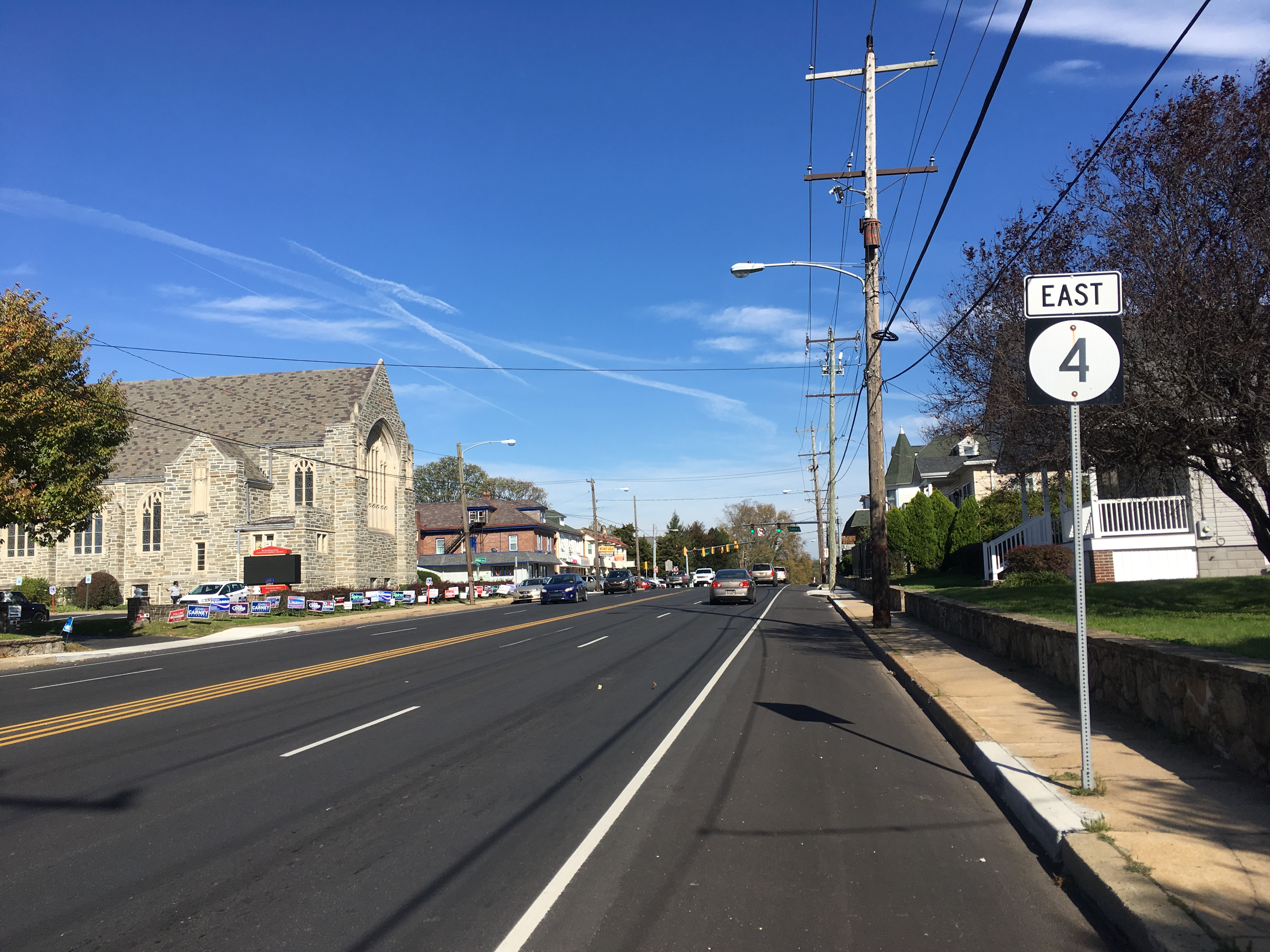
DE 4 eastbound approaching DE 100 near Elsmere

What would become DE 4 east of Christiana was part of a King's Highway constructed in the 17th century connecting Philadelphia to points south. This stretch of road was maintained in the early 19th century by the Wilmington and Christiana Turnpike, a turnpike chartered in 1815.

By 1920, what would become DE 4 existed as a county road. The road from Stanton to Wilmington was paved four years later and the portion west of Stanton was paved by 1936. In 1936, work was underway to improve the road between Stanton and Newport by widening and resurfacing it, with completion a year later. In 1957, Maryland Avenue between Silview and Boxwood Road was widened to four lanes and the one-way pair along Market Street and Justis Street in Newport was established.

The present DE 4 designation first appeared in 1967, at which point it ran from the Maryland border near Newark east to DE 48 in Wilmington, following Chestnut Hill Road from the state line before picking up its current alignment southeast of Newark. By 1971, the route was extended northeast to US 13 Bus. in Bellefonte, forming a brief concurrency with DE 48 before continuing along Washington Street and Washington Street Extension. The eastern terminus of DE 4 was truncated back to DE 48 by 1981, with DE 3 being realigned to the easternmost part of Washington Street Extension three years later. The portion of DE 4 concurrent with DE 7 was widened into a divided highway in 1985, with the road shifted west to a new alignment passing over the Amtrak tracks and the White Clay Creek.

The Christiana Parkway around the southern edge of Newark was completed in September 1983 and DE 4 was realigned to use the Christiana Parkway by 1987, ending at DE 2 (Elkton Road) in the southwestern part of Newark. DE 896 was rerouted to use the Christiana Parkway the following year with DE 2 following by 1990. In 1997, an interchange was constructed with DE 273 in Ogletown as part of a realignment of DE 273 in the area that eliminated a short concurrency with DE 4. The concurrent DE 2 designation was removed from the Christiana Parkway in 2013 as part of simplifying the route numbers in Newark.

== Major intersections ==
The entire route is in New Castle County.

Location	mi	km	Destinations	Notes
Newark	0.00	0.00	DE 279 south / DE 896 north (Elkton Road)	Western terminus; west end of DE 896 concurrency; northern terminus of DE 279
Newark	1.42	2.29	DE 896 south (South College Avenue) to I-95	East end of DE 896 concurrency
Newark	2.29	3.69	DE 72 (South Chapel Street) to DE 273 – Newark, Wilmington	
Ogletown			DE 273 (Ogletown Road/Christiana Road) to I-95 – Newark, Christiana, New Castle	Interchange
Christiana	6.54	10.53	DE 58 east (Churchmans Road) to I-95	Western terminus of DE 58
Christiana	7.50	12.07	DE 7 south (Stanton Christiana Road) to DE 1 / I-95 – Christiana, Dover	West end of DE 7 concurrency
Stanton	8.66	13.94	DE 7 north (Limestone Road)	East end of DE 7 concurrency
Newport	10.82	17.41	DE 141 to DE 41 north / I-95 / I-295 / I-495 – Fairfax, New Castle	DE 141 exit 4
Newport	11.87	19.10	DE 62 west (Boxwood Road) / Middleboro Road	Signed eastern terminus of DE 62
Wilmington	12.54	20.18	DE 100 north (Race Street/Dupont Road)	Southern terminus of DE 100
Wilmington	13.87	22.32	I-95 / US 202 (Wilmington Expressway)	Ramp from northbound I-95/US 202; I-95/US 202 exit 6
Wilmington	14.08	22.66	DE 48 (Martin Luther King Jr. Boulevard/West Second Street)	Eastern terminus; access to Wilmington Station
1.000 mi = 1.609 km; 1.000 km = 0.621 mi: Concurrency terminus; Incomplete access
