= Delaware Route 273 =

State highway in New Castle County, Delaware, United States

Delaware Route 273

Route information
- Maintained by DelDOT
- Length: 12.66 mi (20.37 km)
- Existed: 1936–present
- Tourist routes: Washington–Rochambeau Revolutionary Route

Major junctions
- West end: MD 273 near Newark
- DE 896 in Newark; DE 2 / DE 72 in Newark; DE 4 near Ogletown; I-95 near Christiana; DE 7 near Christiana; DE 1 near Christiana; DE 37 in Pleasantville; DE 58 near Hares Corner; US 13 / US 40 at Hares Corner
- East end: DE 9 / DE 141 in New Castle

Location
- Country: United States
- State: Delaware
- Counties: New Castle

Highway system
- Delaware State Route System; List; Byways
← DE 261	→ DE 279

Delaware Route 273 (DE 273) is a state highway in New Castle County, Delaware, United States. The route runs from Maryland Route 273 (MD 273) at the Maryland border near Newark east to DE 9 and DE 141 in New Castle. The route heads through suburban areas between Newark and New Castle as a multilane road, passing through Ogletown and Christiana. DE 273 intersects DE 896 in downtown Newark; DE 2/DE 72 on the eastern edge of Newark; DE 4 in Ogletown; Interstate 95 (I-95), DE 7, and DE 1 in Christiana; DE 37 in Pleasantville; and DE 58 and U.S. Route 13 (US 13)/US 40 in Hares Corner.

What is now DE 273 was originally built as a state highway in the 1920s and 1930s, with the portion east of Hares Corner becoming a part of US 40, which had crossed the Delaware River on a ferry between New Castle and Pennsville, New Jersey. DE 273 was designated by 1936 to run from the Maryland border near Newark east to Hares Corner. In the 1950s, the route was extended east to New Castle when US 40 was realigned to the Delaware Memorial Bridge. DE 273 was moved onto new alignments around Christiana in the 1980s and through Ogletown in the 1990s.

== Route description ==
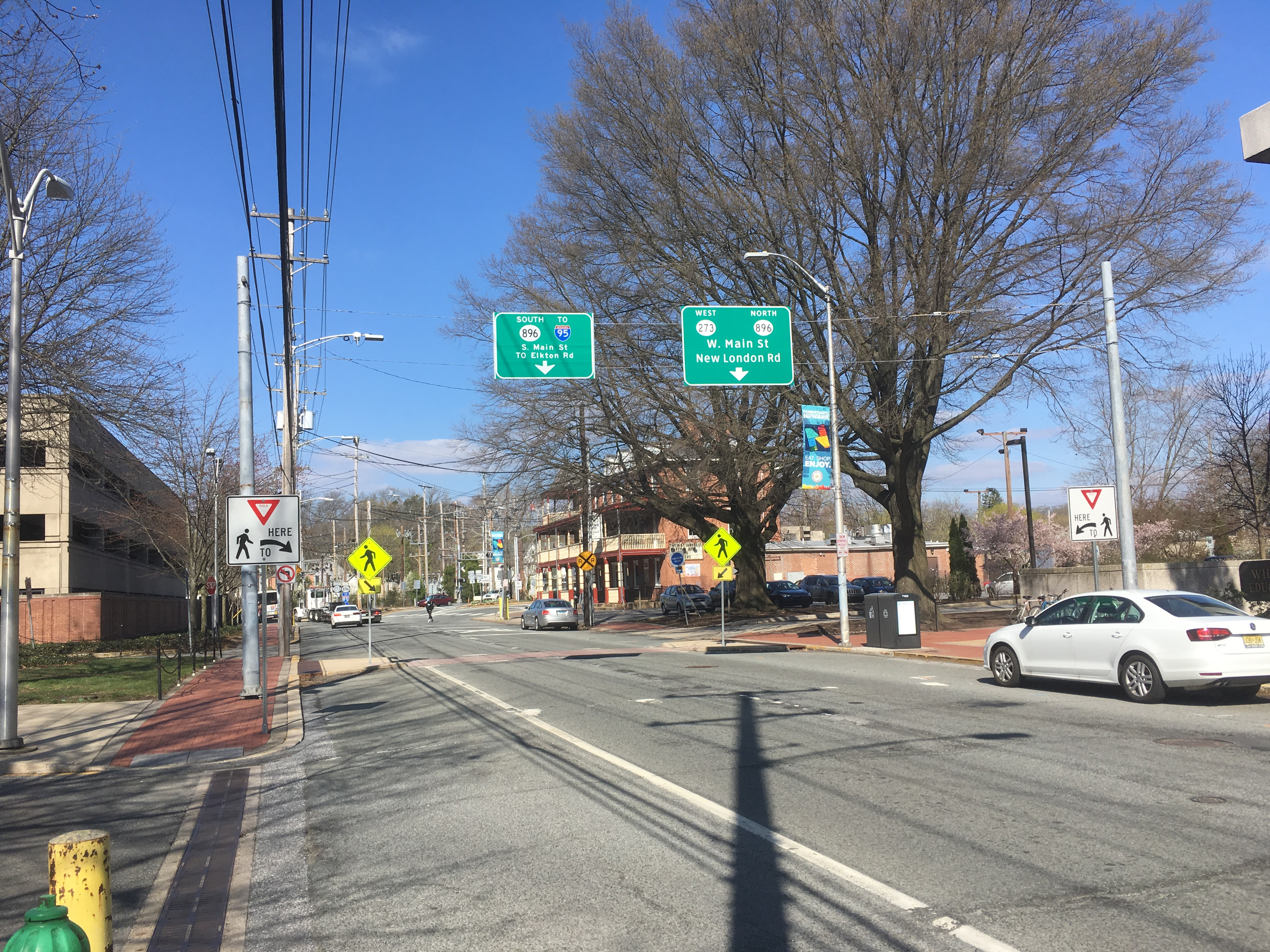
DE 273 westbound/DE 896 northbound along West Main Street in Newark approaching South Main Street

DE 273 begins at the Maryland border west of the city of Newark, where the road continues west into that state as MD 273. From the state line, the route heads southeast on two-lane undivided Nottingham Road, running through wooded suburban neighborhoods as it enters Newark, crossing the Christina River and passing to the south of the Newark Country Club. DE 273 becomes West Main Street as it approaches the downtown area, intersecting the southbound direction of DE 896, at which point DE 273 forms a concurrency with southbound DE 896. The road crosses CSX's Philadelphia Subdivision railroad line at-grade and comes to an intersection with New London Road, which runs northwest as northbound DE 896, and South Main Street, which heads southwest as DE 896.

At this point, DE 273 splits into the one-way pair of West Delaware Avenue eastbound and West Main Street westbound, with eastbound DE 273 briefly following one-way South Main Street southwest to get from West Main Street to West Delaware Avenue. The one-way pair, which carries two lanes in each direction, becomes concurrent with northbound DE 896 in both directions until the South College Avenue intersection. DE 273 runs through the University of Delaware campus and continues through the downtown as East Delaware Avenue eastbound and East Main Street westbound. Farther east, the one-way pair crosses the Pomeroy and Newark Rail Trail and passes the Newark Transit Hub serving DART First State buses, which is located between East Main Street and East Delaware Avenue. East Delaware Avenue shifts farther to the south of East Main Street, with the one-way streets running between a residential neighborhood and East Delaware Avenue heading to the north of Newark High School. Past here, the route comes to an intersection with DE 2/DE 72. At this point, eastbound DE 273 turns north to join DE 72 on four-lane divided Library Avenue to rejoin westbound DE 273.

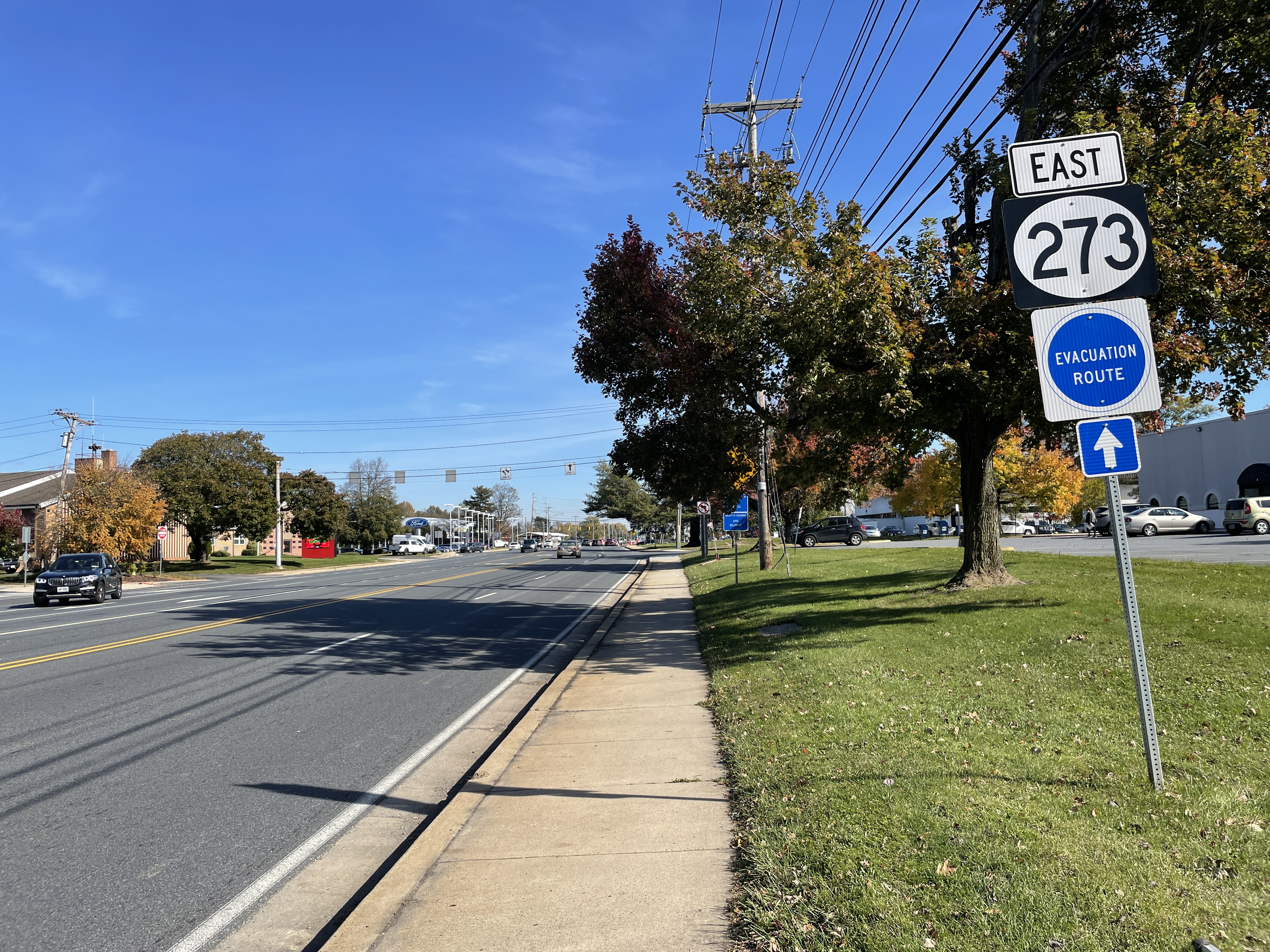
DE 273 eastbound past DE 2/DE 72 in Newark

Past DE 2/DE 72, DE 273 leaves Newark and heads east on Ogletown Road, a five-lane road with a center left-turn lane that passes through commercial areas, soon becoming a four-lane divided highway. The route continues east and has an intersection with Ruthar Drive, with an eastbound jughandle for U-turns at the intersection. Past here, the road comes to a bridge over Amtrak's Northeast Corridor railroad line. The route turns southeast and reaches an interchange with DE 4 and Salem Church Road in the community of Ogletown. Past this interchange, DE 273 becomes Christiana Road and heads east through suburban residential neighborhoods with some businesses. The road bends southeast again as it comes to a modified cloverleaf interchange with I-95 (Delaware Turnpike). Following this, the route heads into commercial areas, bypassing the community of Christiana to the southwest. DE 273 runs south through wooded areas and intersects Old Baltimore Pike before crossing the Christina River and curving east, coming to a junction with DE 7. A park and ride lot is located at the northeast corner of this intersection. A short distance later, the road reaches a diamond interchange with the DE 1 freeway.

Following this interchange, DE 273 heads through woods before entering areas of suburban homes and businesses, coming to a junction with the southern terminus of DE 37 in Pleasantville. The route continues east and intersects the eastern terminus of DE 58 near the Wilmington Airport. A short distance later, the road comes to a junction with US 13/US 40 in Hares Corner.

Past this intersection, DE 273 becomes concurrent with DE 9 Truck and turns into two-lane undivided Frenchtown Road, with a multi-use trail parallel to the north. The road enters the city of New Castle and heads east between business parks and warehouses to the south and farm fields to the north. DE 273 comes to an intersection with DE 9 and the southern terminus of DE 141 to the west of the center of New Castle, where the route, along with DE 9 Truck, ends. Past the eastern terminus, the road continues east as part of DE 9. Some signage for DE 273, including an end sign at East 6th Street, does still exist east of its formal terminus.

The section of DE 273 between Chapman Road and Browns Lane in Christiana is part of the Washington–Rochambeau Revolutionary Route, a National Historic Trail. DE 273 has an annual average daily traffic count ranging from a high of 49,421 vehicles at the I-95 interchange to a low of 6,924 vehicles at the Hillside Road intersection in Newark. The portion of DE 273 east of DE 896 is part of the National Highway System.

== History ==
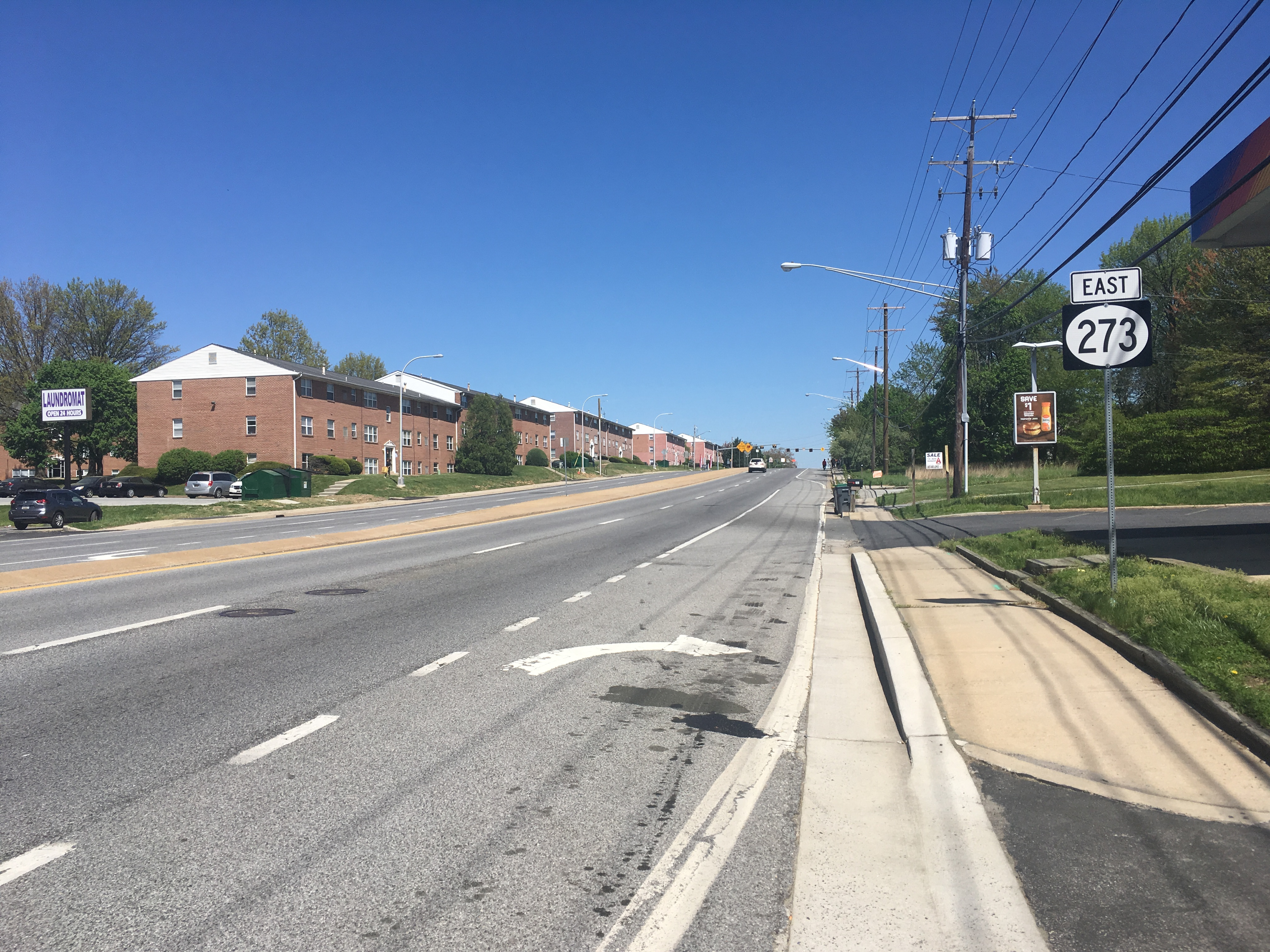
DE 273 eastbound past DE 37 in Pleasantville

What is now DE 273 originally existed as a county road by 1920. Four years later, the portion of road through Newark was upgraded to a state highway while the road was paved between Hares Corner and New Castle. A year later, the section between Ogletown and Christiana was planned as a state highway while the section east of Basin Road was upgraded to a state highway. In 1930, the road between the Maryland border and Newark was built as a state highway, providing a shorter route to the Conowingo Dam in Maryland. The following year, US 40 was designated to run on the portion of road between Hares Corner and New Castle, where it connected to a ferry across the Delaware River to Pennsville, New Jersey. Also by this time, all of present-day DE 273 was upgraded to a state highway except the portion of US 40 between Hares Corner and the Basin Road intersection in New Castle. In 1934, recommendations were made to upgrade US 40 to a state highway between Hares Corner and New Castle. The portion of US 40 between Hares Corner and New Castle was taken over by the state on July 1, 1935. Construction on upgrading this section began in 1936, with the project completed later that year. The same year, a bridge was constructed over a Pennsylvania Railroad line (now the Jack A. Markell Trail) in New Castle.

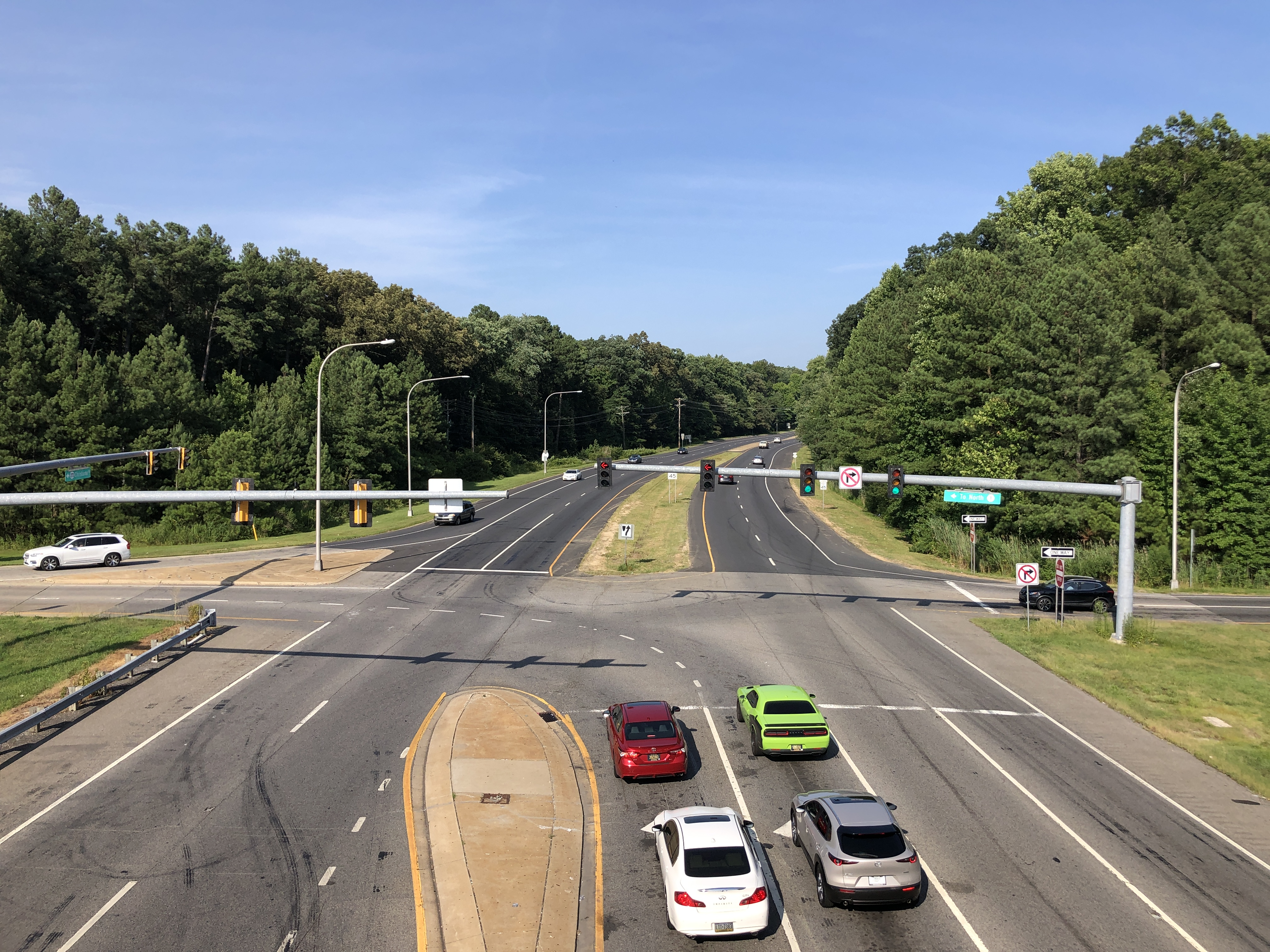
DE 273 eastbound at DE 1 near Christiana

DE 273 was designated to run from the Maryland border west of Newark east to US 13 and US 40 in Hares Corner by 1936, roughly following its current alignment. In Newark, the route ran concurrent with DE 2. By 1952, US 40 was realigned to use the Delaware Memorial Bridge to cross the Delaware River, and DE 273 was extended east along the former alignment of US 40 on Frenchtown Road, Delaware Street, and Ferry Cut Off Street to end at present-day DE 9 at 6th Street in New Castle. In 1956, DE 2 and DE 273 were routed onto the one-way pair of Delaware Avenue eastbound and Main Street westbound in downtown Newark following an eastward extension of Delaware Avenue to the intersection between DE 2 and DE 273 east of the city.

By 1984, DE 9 was realigned to follow DE 273 east of the DE 141 intersection. DE 273 was realigned to bypass Christiana a year later, having previously followed Main Street through the community. DE 2 was routed to bypass Newark and DE 2 Bus. became concurrent with DE 273 through Newark by 1990. In 1997, DE 273 was moved to its current alignment in the Ogletown area, eliminating a short concurrency with DE 4 and involving the construction of an interchange with that route. The former alignment of DE 273 through Ogletown is known as Ogletown Road. The concurrent DE 2 Bus. designation was eliminated in 2013 as part of simplifying the route numbers in Newark. By 2015, DE 273 signage was cut back to its current eastern terminus, removing the concurrency with DE 9.

On March 15, 2021, a construction project began that will improve the interchange between DE 273 and I-95 by realigning ramps and widening DE 273 through the interchange. Construction on this interchange improvement is planned to be completed in 2023.

== Major intersections ==
The entire route is in New Castle County.

Location	mi	km	Destinations	Notes
Newark	0.00	0.00	MD 273 west (Telegraph Road)	Maryland state line; western terminus
Newark	1.74	2.80	DE 896 south (North Hillside Road)	Southbound direction of DE 896; west end of DE 896 southbound overlap
Newark	1.85	2.98	DE 896 (South Main Street/New London Road) to I-95	East end of DE 896 southbound overlap; west end of DE 896 northbound overlap
Newark	2.04	3.28	DE 896 north (South College Avenue)	Northbound direction of DE 896; east end of DE 896 northbound overlap
Newark	3.03	4.88	DE 72 south (Library Avenue)	West end of eastbound overlap with DE 72
Newark	3.23	5.20	DE 2 east / DE 72 north (Capitol Trail)	East end of eastbound overlap with DE 72; western terminus of DE 2
Ogletown			DE 4 (Chestnut Hill Road/Ogletown Stanton Road) / Salem Church Road – South Newark, Churchmans Crossing	Interchange
Christiana	6.99	11.25	I-95 (Delaware Turnpike) – Delaware Memorial Bridge, Wilmington, Newark, Baltimore	I-95 exit 3
Christiana	8.57	13.79	DE 7 (East Main Street/Bear Christiana Road) – Christiana	
Christiana			DE 1 to DE 7 north / I-95 / US 13 – Churchmans Crossing, Stanton, Dover	DE 1 exit 162
Pleasantville	9.45	15.21	DE 37 north (Airport Road)	Southern terminus of DE 37
Hares Corner	10.95	17.62	DE 58 west (Churchmans Road)	Eastern terminus of DE 58
Hares Corner	11.31	18.20	US 13 / US 40 / DE 9 Truck south (Dupont Highway)	West end of DE 9 Truck overlap
New Castle	12.66	20.37	DE 9 (Washington Street/Delaware Street) DE 141 north (Basin Road) DE 9 Truck ends	Eastern terminus; southern terminus of DE 141; northern terminus of DE 9 Truck
1.000 mi = 1.609 km; 1.000 km = 0.621 mi: Concurrency terminus
