= Delaware Route 37 =

State highway in New Castle County, Delaware, United States

Delaware Route 37

Route information
- Maintained by DelDOT
- Length: 3.11 mi (5.01 km)
- Existed: 1985–present

Major junctions
- South end: DE 273 in Pleasantville
- DE 58 near New Castle
- North end: US 202 / DE 141 near Wilmington Manor

Location
- Country: United States
- State: Delaware
- Counties: New Castle

Highway system
- Delaware State Route System; List; Byways
← DE 36	→ US 40

Delaware Route 37 (DE 37) is a state highway in New Castle County, Delaware. The route runs from DE 273 in Pleasantville northeast to U.S. Route 202 (US 202)/DE 141 north of the Wilmington Airport near Wilmington Manor. The road runs through suburban neighborhoods and passes along the edge of Wilmington Airport along Airport Road before it provides access to a business park along Commons Boulevard. The Airport Road portion of DE 37 was originally a dirt road that was paved by 1942. DE 37 was assigned to its current alignment by 1985.

== Route description ==
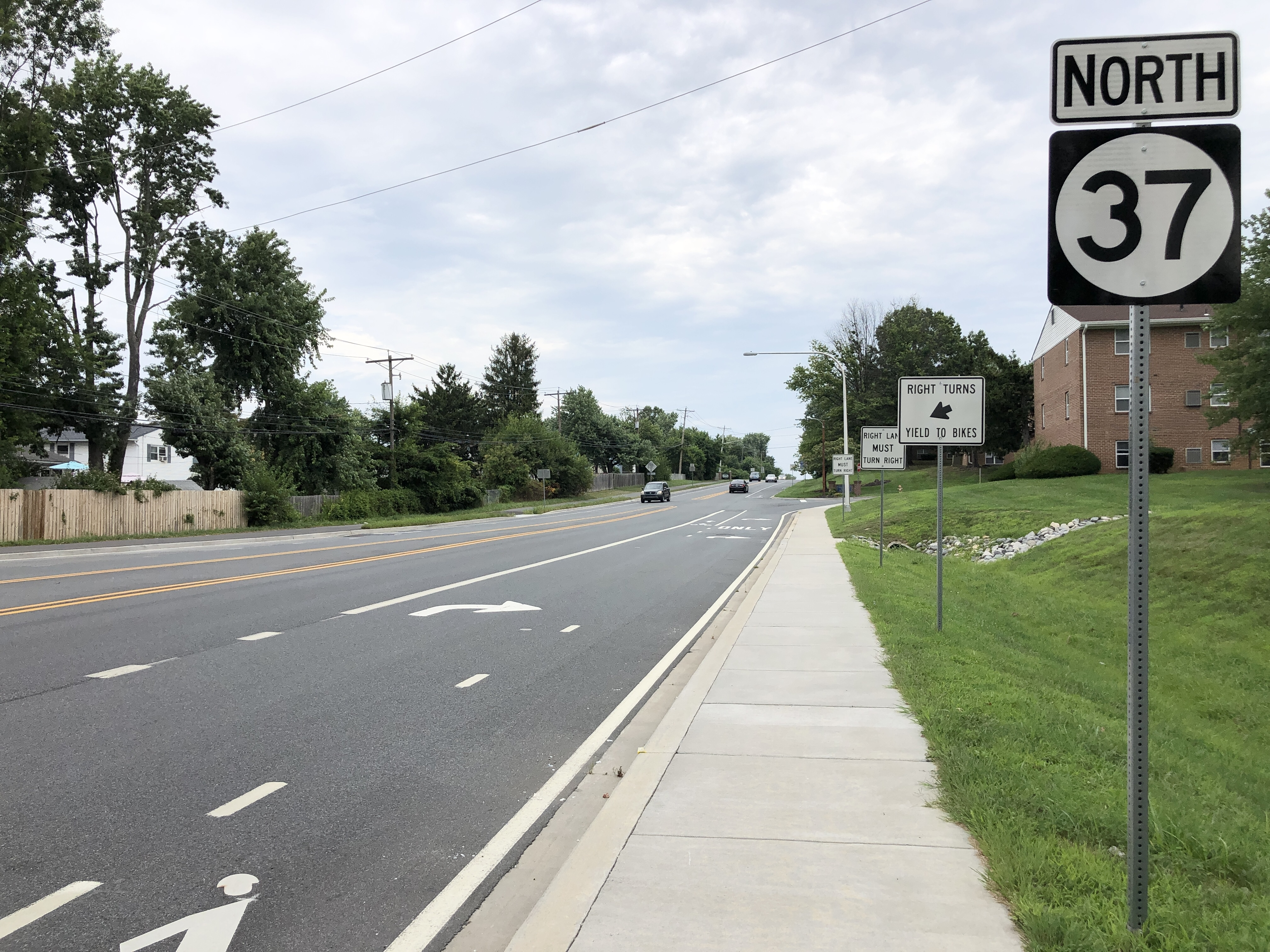
DE 37 northbound past DE 273 in Pleasantville

DE 37 heads to the northeast from DE 273 on two-lane undivided Airport Road. It passes through suburban neighborhoods and then intersects DE 58 in a commercial area. Past the DE 58 intersection, the route widens into a four-lane divided highway and forms the northwestern boundary of the Wilmington Airport, with residential areas on the opposite side of the road. After the boundary with the airport, Airport Road splits to the northwest and DE 37 becomes Commons Boulevard, and it passes through the New Castle Corporate Commons, a business park located adjacent to the Wilmington Airport. The route continues northeast and intersects Spruance Drive, which is the entrance road to the Delaware Air National Guard's New Castle Air National Guard Base to the east, before it comes to its terminus at US 202/DE 141.

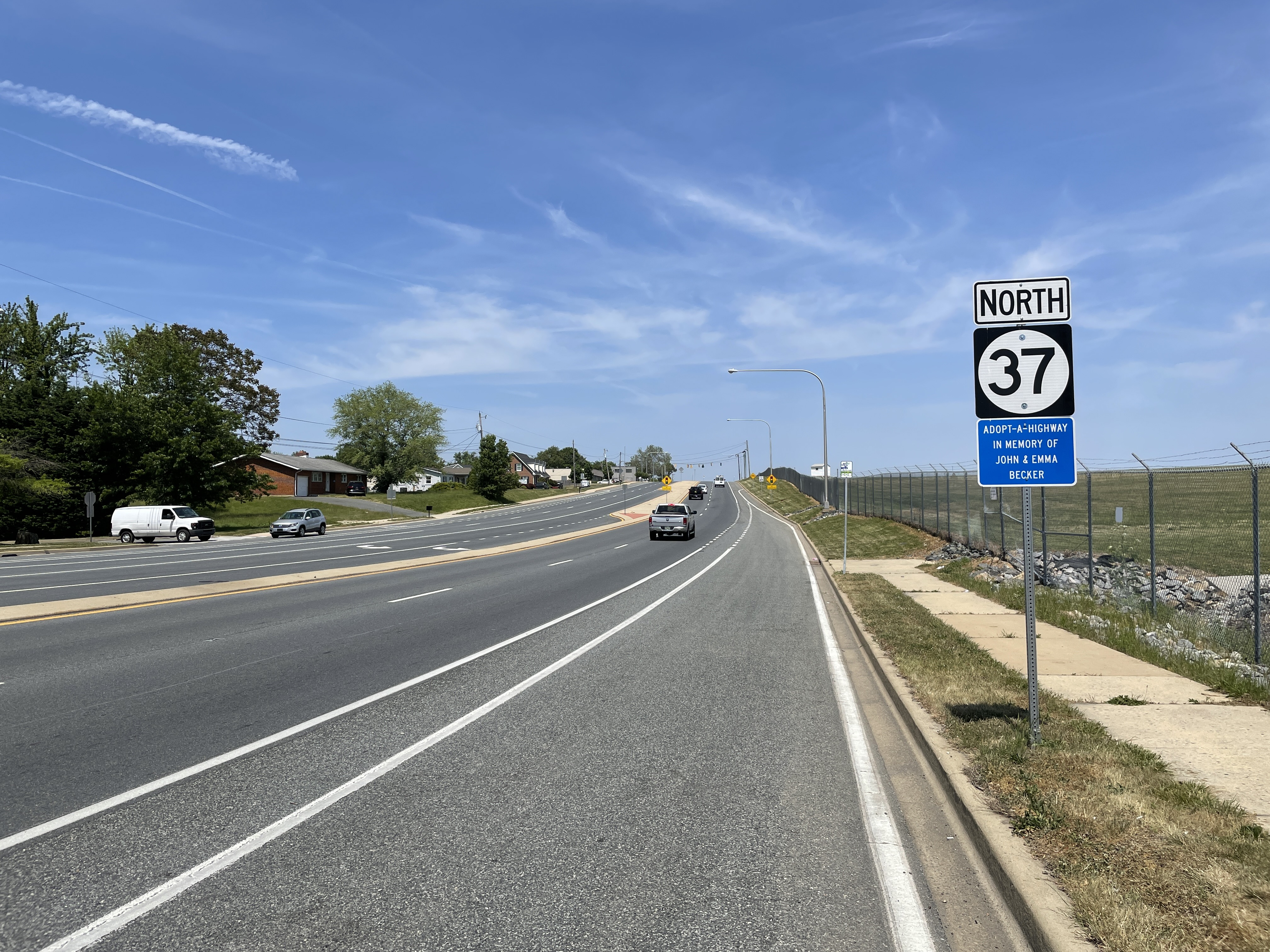
DE 37 northbound past DE 58 near New Castle

DE 37 has an annual average daily traffic count ranging from a high of 21,344 vehicles at the US 202/DE 141 intersection to a low of 8,264 vehicles at the DE 58 intersection.

== History ==
By 1920, the Airport Road portion of DE 37 existed as a county road. This road was originally a dirt road that was paved by 1942. In 1985, the Commons Boulevard portion of the route was built and DE 37 was designated to run along its current alignment. Between May 2005 and June 2006, DE 37 was reconstructed and widened from a two-lane road to a four-lane divided highway along Airport Road between DE 58 and Commons Boulevard. The widening project cost $8.6 million.

== Major intersections ==
The entire route is in New Castle County.

Location	mi	km	Destinations	Notes
Pleasantville	0.00	0.00	DE 273 (Christiana Road) – New Castle, Christiana	Southern terminus
	1.17	1.88	DE 58 (Churchmans Road)	
Wilmington Manor	3.11	5.01	US 202 / DE 141 (Basin Road) to US 13	Northern terminus
1.000 mi = 1.609 km; 1.000 km = 0.621 mi
