= Silview, Delaware =

Unincorporated community in Delaware, United States

- Unincorporated community
- Location within Delaware Location within the United States
- Coordinates: 39°42′46″N 75°37′19″W
- Country: United States
- State: Delaware
- County: New Castle
- Elevation: 30 ft (9.1 m)
- Time zone: UTC-5 (Eastern (EST))
  - Summer (DST): UTC-4 (EDT)
- Area code: 302
- GNIS feature ID: 214654

Silview is an unincorporated community in New Castle County, Delaware, United States. Silview is located along Delaware Route 4, west of Newport.
