= Hares Corner, Delaware =

Unincorporated community in Delaware, US

- Unincorporated community
- Location within Delaware Location within the United States
- Coordinates: 39°39′55″N 75°36′15″W
- Country: United States
- State: Delaware
- County: New Castle
- Elevation: 66 ft (20 m)
- Time zone: UTC-5 (Eastern (EST))
  - Summer (DST): UTC-4 (EDT)
- Area code: 302
- GNIS feature ID: 216108

Hares Corner is an unincorporated community in New Castle County, Delaware, United States. Hares Corner is located at the intersection of U.S. Route 13/U.S. Route 40 and Delaware Route 273, west of New Castle and immediately south of Wilmington Airport.

== History ==
The community was once a stagecoach stop and a cattle market. Hares Corner was home to the Green Tree Inn, which was demolished in 1931 to allow US 13 to be widened to a divided highway.

The Hares Corner post office operated from 1863 to 1891. According to historian Harvey Cochran Bounds, the 1890 opening of the post office at nearby Farnhurst "had more than a little to do" with the closure of the Hares Corner post office. In 1890, Hares Corner's population was 50. In the 1920s, Hares Corner was the site of fox hunting; these events were hosted by the Hares Corner Community Club.
