= Pleasantville, Delaware =

Unincorporated community in Delaware, United States

- Unincorporated community
- Location within Delaware Location within the United States
- Coordinates: 39°39′50″N 75°37′34″W
- Country: United States
- State: Delaware
- County: New Castle
- Elevation: 72 ft (22 m)
- Time zone: UTC-5 (Eastern (EST))
  - Summer (DST): UTC-4 (EDT)
- Area code: 302
- GNIS feature ID: 214464

Pleasantville is an unincorporated community in New Castle County, Delaware, United States. Pleasantville is located on Delaware Route 273, west of New Castle.
