= Farnhurst, Delaware =

Unincorporated community in Delaware, United States

- Unincorporated community
- Location within Delaware Location within the United States
- Coordinates: 39°41′35″N 75°34′39″W
- Country: United States
- State: Delaware
- County: New Castle
- Elevation: 43 ft (13 m)
- Time zone: UTC-5 (Eastern (EST))
  - Summer (DST): UTC-4 (EDT)
- Area code: 302
- GNIS feature ID: 216946

Farnhurst is an unincorporated community in New Castle County, Delaware, United States. The site of two historic hospitals (one now gone) and a number of cemeteries, the community once had a post office, school, and rail station.

== Geography ==
Farnhurst is located at the junction of Interstate 295, U.S. Route 13, and U.S. Route 40, 2.2 miles (3.5 km) north-northwest of New Castle.

== History ==
=== Late 1800s ===
Farnhurst is the site of the Delaware State Hospital, a psychiatric institution, originally opened in 1889, and often called Farnhurst. The New Castle County Almshouse/Hospital also operated in Farnhurst from 1884 to 1933; these two large institutions were on adjoining plots.

A post office opened at Farnhurst on January 15, 1890. According to historian Harvey Cochran Bounds, the 1890 opening of the post office in Farnhurst "had more than a little to do" with the closure of the nearby Hares Corner post office. The Farnhurst post office was moved to the psychiatric hospital grounds in the 1930s.

In 1898, a stagecoach line ran three times per week between Wilmington and Farnhurst; a trolley system connecting Farnhurst to Wilmington was proposed in the Wilmington Evening Journal. At that time, a round-trip coach between Farnhurst and Wilmington cost twenty cents.

In the late 1800s and early 1900s, the Farnhurst Asylum had its own baseball team, which played against teams such as the Wilmington Actives.

=== Early 1900s ===
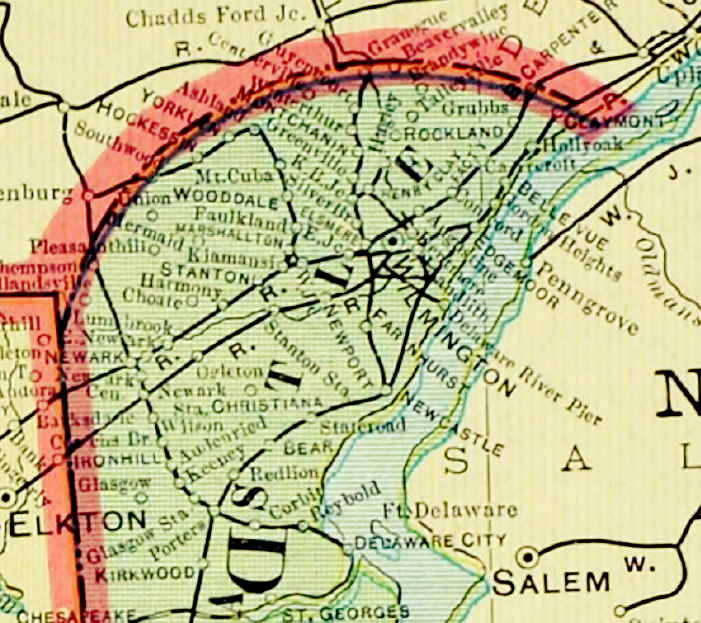
Farnhurst in northern New Castle County, Delaware, in 1902

In 1901, newspapers announced the creation of a village at Farnhurst. This village housed workmen on the Philadelphia, Baltimore and Washington Railroad. The 25 new buildings, at that time described as sheds, were built overnight. That same year, the P.B.& W. rail line in Farnhurst was altered, easing the curves of the railroad and leveling the steep grade; there was also a beautification project, with rail workers adding flower beds and landscaping to the rail station.

In 1904, Farnhurst was described as a post village on the Philadelphia, Baltimore and Washington Railroad. The station opened largely to service the hospital and the nearby almshouse.

In 1912, Delaware courts ruled that the old soldiers living in the Farnhurst almshouse would be allowed to vote. The Wilmington Journal reported that "the court decided the old soldiers have a right to vote and the people will see that the men get their votes in the box and are counted."

In 1920, Farnhurst's population was 332. Around this time, the population of the State Hospital was 541, and the New Castle County Almshouse's population was 220.

In 1934, Gracelawn Memorial Park, a cemetery, opened across the highway from the two hospitals.

In 1939, a new chapel was completed at the State Hospital. A project of the Works Progress Administration, the building was completed in September of that year. In 1940, Farnhurst's population was 250.

=== Late 1900s ===
The older cemetery on the grounds of the hospital and almshouse, which served as a potters field for New Castle County, was mostly obliterated in the 1950s/1960s by highway construction of the Farnhurst interchange providing access to the Delaware Memorial Bridge.

The Farnhurst post office closed in 1958. In 1961, the hospital/almshouse, renamed the New Castle Building after its 1933 closure, burned to the ground.

In 1960, Farnhurst's population was 350.

The Farnhurst School was still intact in the 1980s. Since 1978, this building has been the Howard J. Weston Senior Center, now a part of the Wilmington Manor census-designated place.
