= Delaware Route 62 =

State highway in New Castle County, Delaware, United States

Delaware Route 62

Route information
- Maintained by DelDOT
- Length: 3.02 mi (4.86 km)
- Existed: 1981–present

Major junctions
- West end: DE 2 / DE 41 in Prices Corner
- DE 141 in Belvedere; DE 4 near Newport
- East end: Dead end near Newport

Location
- Country: United States
- State: Delaware
- Counties: New Castle

Highway system
- Delaware State Route System; List; Byways
← DE 58	→ DE 71

Delaware Route 62 (DE 62) is a state highway in New Castle County, Delaware in the United States. The route runs from DE 2 and the southern terminus of DE 41 in Prices Corner east to a dead end near Newport; however, DE 62 signage ends at the DE 4 intersection. The road runs through suburban areas along Newport Gap Pike and Boxwood Road, meeting the DE 141 freeway at an interchange. The Newport Gap Pike portion of road was built as a state highway by 1925 and became part of DE 41 by 1936. Boxwood Road was improved in 1946. DE 62 was assigned to its current alignment by 1981.

== Route description ==
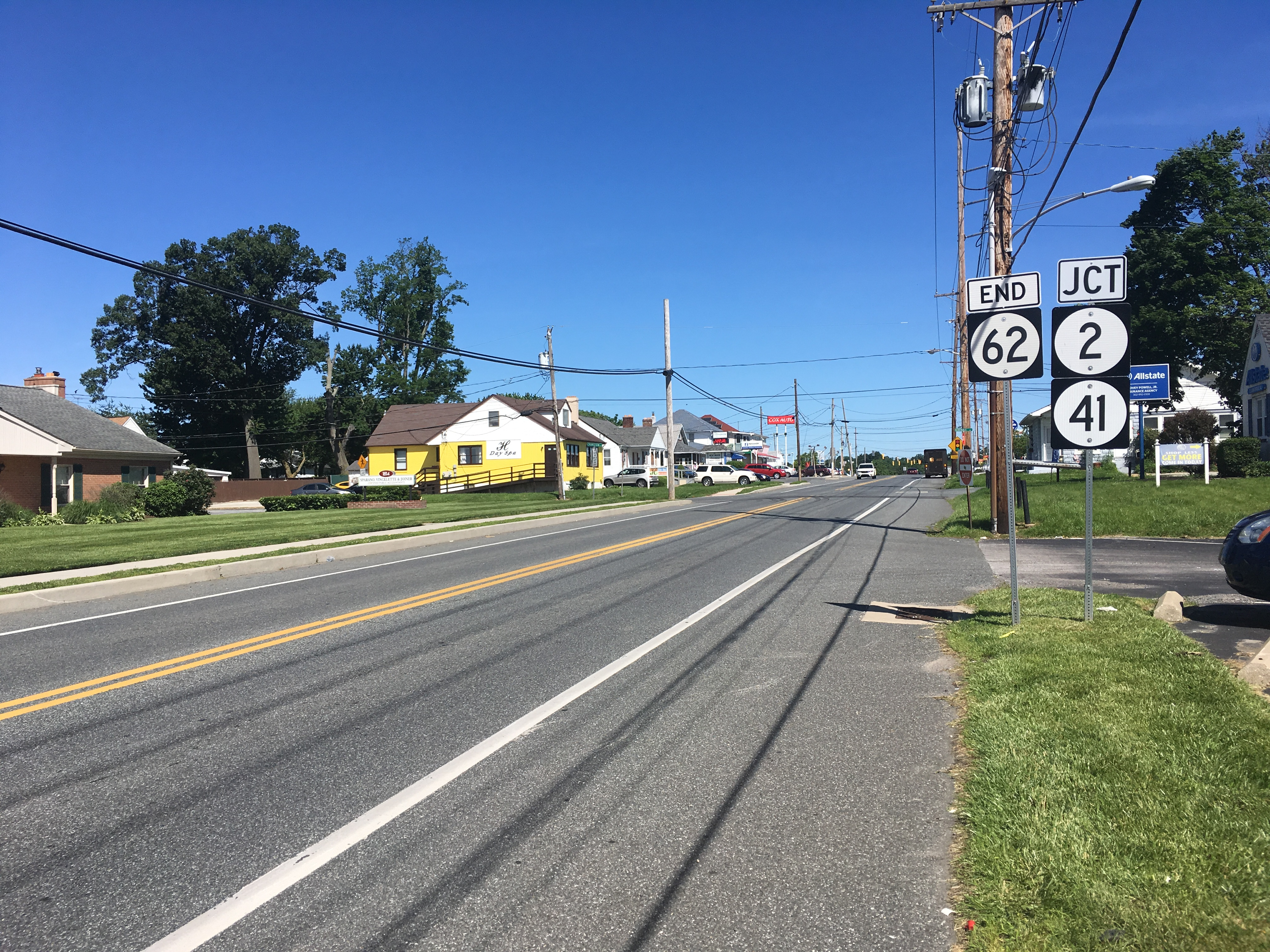
DE 62 westbound approaching its terminus at DE 2 and DE 41 in Prices Corner

DE 62 heads southeast from DE 2 (Kirkwood Highway) on Newport Gap Pike, a two-lane undivided road. Newport Gap Pike continues northwest past this intersection as DE 41. The road passes west of Prices Corner Shopping Center and intersects Old Capitol Trail as it heads through suburban residential and commercial developments, crossing the Wilmington and Western Railroad and CSX's Philadelphia Subdivision railroad line at-grade. DE 62 passes more development and reaches the community of Belvedere, where it turns into a divided highway and comes to a ramp from southbound DE 141.

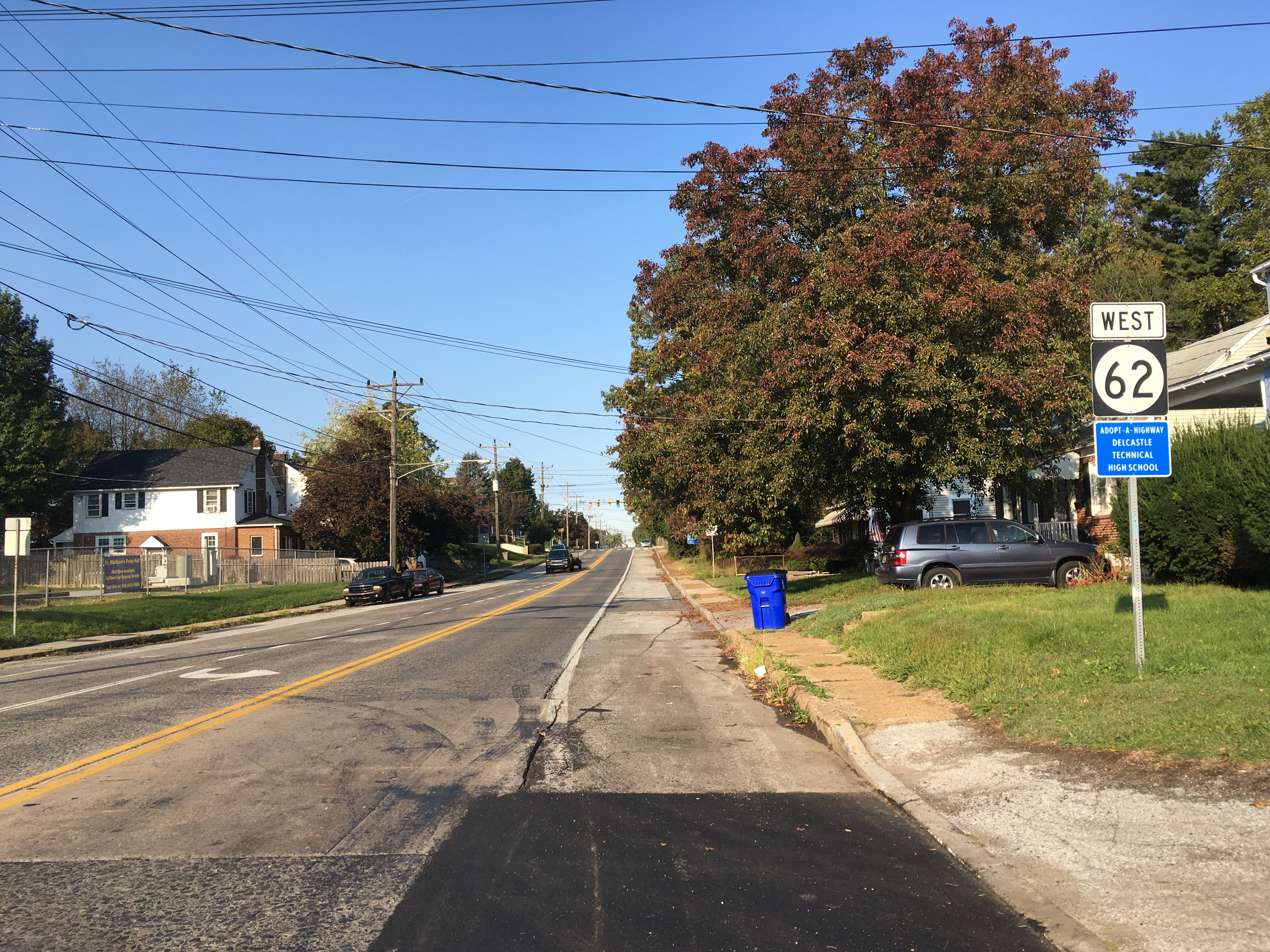
DE 62 running west from DE 4 near Newport

At this point, the route turns east onto Boxwood Road, a four-lane divided highway, with Newport Gap Pike continuing south to provide access to southbound DE 141. DE 62 passes over the DE 141 freeway and intersects Centerville Road, which provides access to and from northbound DE 141. Past this intersection, the road becomes two lanes and undivided, passing to the south of an Amazon fulfillment center and to the north of residential subdivisions. DE 62 continues through more residential neighborhoods, passing to the north of the Conrad Schools of Science, and reaches an intersection with DE 4 (Maryland Avenue/Newport Pike), where DE 62 signage ends. The route officially continues east on Middleboro Road through more neighborhoods, intersecting South Dupont Road before coming to a dead end. DE 62 has an annual average daily traffic count ranging from a high of 23,750 vehicles at the intersection of Newport Gap Pike and Boxwood Road to a low of 283 vehicles at the eastern terminus.

== History ==
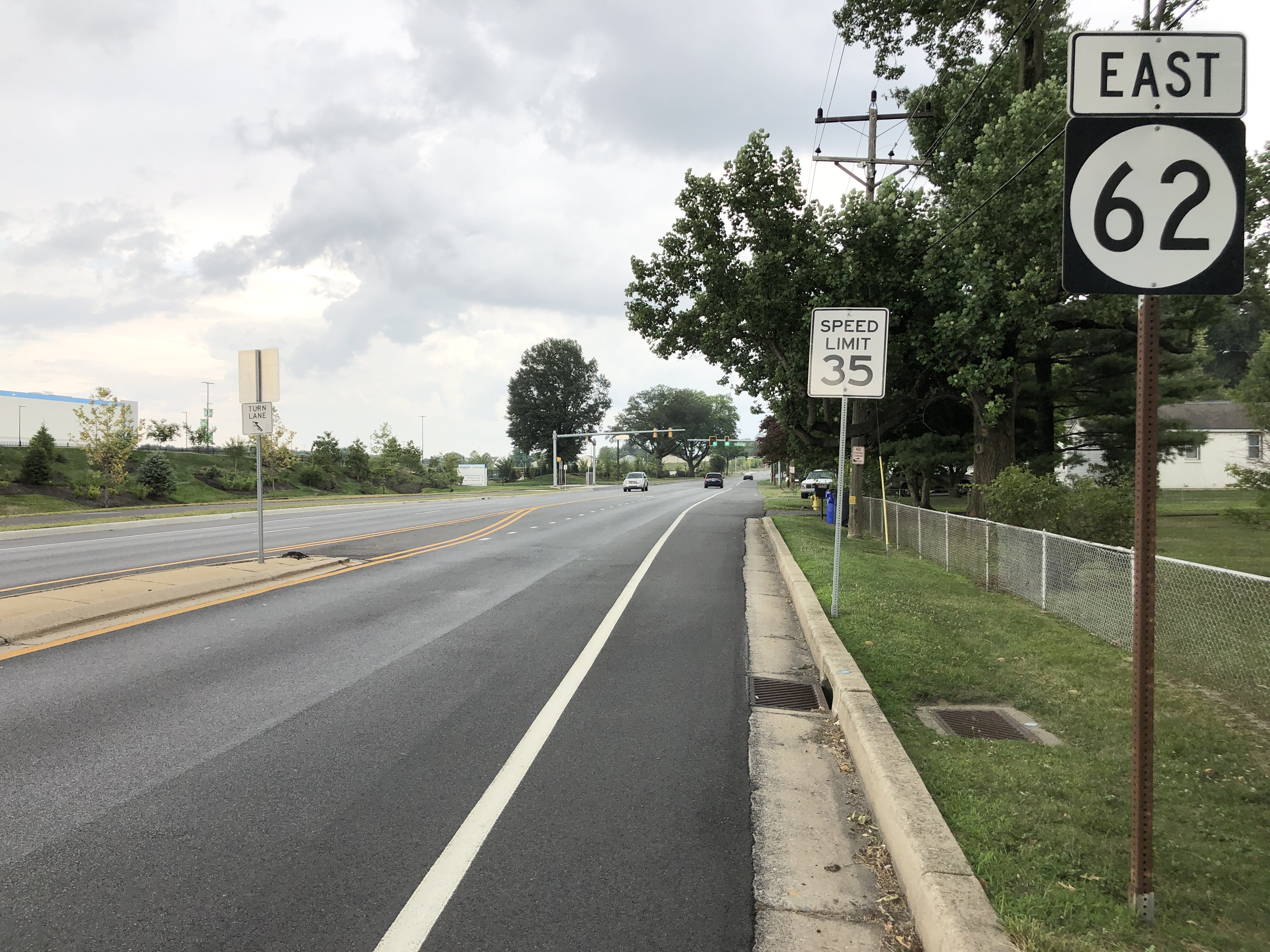
DE 62 eastbound past DE 141 in Belvedere

What is now the Newport Gap Pike portion of DE 62 was originally chartered as the Gap and Newport Turnpike in 1808, an extension of the 1807-chartered turnpike in Pennsylvania that was to run from Gap, Pennsylvania, southeast to Newport, Delaware. By 1920, what is now DE 62 existed as a county road. The Newport Gap Pike portion of the route became a state highway by 1925. This state highway became a part of DE 41 by 1936, when Delaware designated its state highways. In 1946, Boxwood Road was improved to provide access to the new General Motors' Wilmington Assembly plant (now the site of an Amazon fulfillment center) along the road. By 1981, DE 62 was designated onto its current alignment, with the Newport Gap Pike section replacing a portion of DE 41.

== Major intersections ==
The entire route is in New Castle County.

Location	mi	km	Destinations	Notes
Prices Corner	0.00	0.00	DE 2 (Kirkwood Highway) – Newark, Wilmington DE 41 north (Newport Gap Pike)	Western terminus of DE 62; southern terminus of DE 41
Belvedere	1.10	1.77	DE 141 to I-95 / I-295 – New Castle	DE 141 exit 5
Newport	2.29	3.69	DE 4 (Maryland Avenue/Newport Pike)	Eastern terminus of DE 62 signage
Newport	3.02	4.86	Dead end	Official eastern terminus of DE 62
1.000 mi = 1.609 km; 1.000 km = 0.621 mi
