= Delaware Route 2 =

State highway in New Castle, Delaware, United States

Delaware Route 2
- DE 2 highlighted in red

Route information
- Maintained by DelDOT
- Length: 10.81 mi (17.40 km)
- Existed: 1936–present

Major junctions
- West end: DE 72 / DE 273 in Newark
- DE 72 near Newark; DE 7 in Marshallton; DE 41 / DE 62 in Prices Corner; DE 141 in Prices Corner; DE 100 in Elsmere; DE 48 in Wilmington; DE 9 in Wilmington
- East end: DE 52 in Wilmington

Location
- Country: United States
- State: Delaware
- Counties: New Castle

Highway system
- Delaware State Route System; List; Byways
← DE 1D	→ DE 3

Delaware Route 2 (DE 2) is a 10.81-mile-long (17.40 km) east–west state highway located in the northern part of New Castle County in the U.S. state of Delaware. It runs from DE 72 and DE 273 on the eastern edge of Newark east to DE 52 in Wilmington. Between Newark and Wilmington, the route is a four- to six-lane divided highway called Capitol Trail and Kirkwood Highway that passes through suburban areas, running through Marshallton, Prices Corner, and Elsmere. In Wilmington, DE 2 is routed along the one-way pair of Lincoln Street eastbound and Union Street westbound, passing through urban areas.

What would become DE 2 was paved by 1924 and became a state highway in 1927, receiving the DE 2 designation by 1936. At this time, the western terminus of the route was at the Maryland state line southwest of Newark, where the road continued into that state as Maryland Route 279 (MD 279). The road was progressively widened into a divided highway from Wilmington to Newark between 1940 and 1964, bypassing some portions of the road which are now known as Old Capitol Trail. DE 2 was routed to bypass Newark to the south by 1990, with DE 2 Business (DE 2 Bus.) designated on the former route through Newark. In 2013, the western terminus of DE 2 was truncated to its current location and DE 2 Bus. was decommissioned. The westernmost portion of the former route was designated as DE 279, matching the route number just across the Maryland state line.

== Route description ==
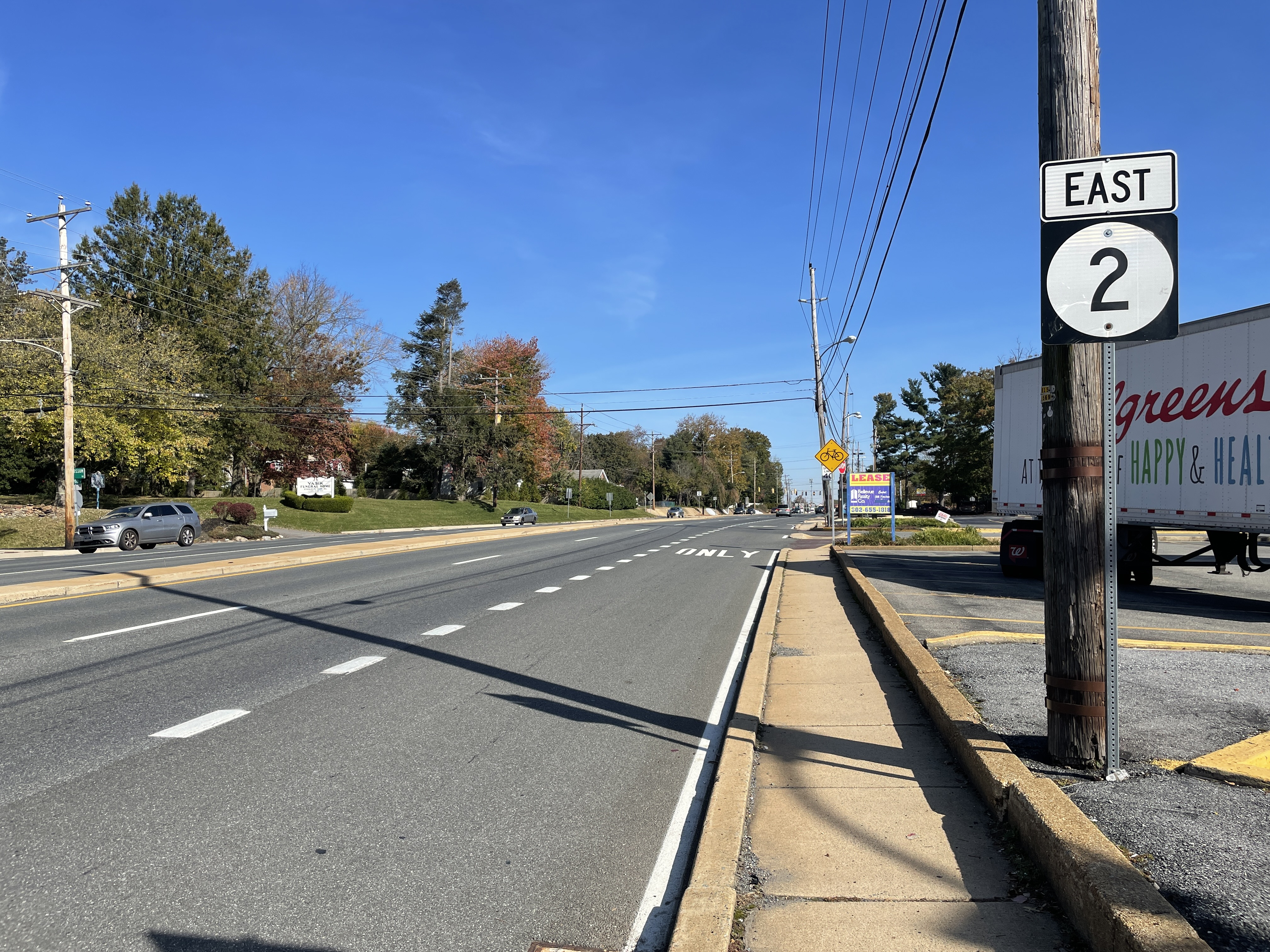
DE 2 eastbound past DE 72 near Newark

DE 2 begins at an intersection with DE 72 and DE 273 in the eastern part of the city of Newark, where DE 72 continues south on Library Avenue and DE 273 runs west along the one-way pair of East Delaware Avenue eastbound and East Main Street westbound and east along Ogletown Road. From here, DE 2 heads north concurrent with DE 72 on Capitol Trail, a four-lane divided highway. The road turns northeast and passes under CSX's Philadelphia Subdivision railroad line before it leaves Newark and continues through residential areas, briefly becoming undivided as it crosses White Clay Creek.

After the road crosses Middle Run, DE 72 splits from DE 2 by heading northwest on Possum Park Road, with DE 2 continuing northeast through suburban areas consisting of homes and businesses as a four-lane divided highway. The road passes to the south of the community of Pike Creek and intersects several roads including Polly Drummond Hill Road/Red Mill Road, North Harmony Road, and Upper Pike Creek Road. After the Upper Pike Creek Road intersection, the route crosses Pike Creek. At the Pike Creek Road junction, the road name becomes Kirkwood Highway. The highway continues through suburbs and reaches an intersection with Delaware Park Drive, an access road that leads south to Delaware Park, which consists of a Thoroughbred horse racetrack, casino, and golf course. Following this, the road has a junction Milltown Road prior to crossing Mill Creek. In Marshallton, the route widens to six lanes and comes to an intersection with DE 7 (Limestone Road).

Past this intersection, DE 2 continues past businesses and passes south of the Delaware State University Wilmington campus, crossing Duncan Road. The road comes to a bridge over Red Clay Creek and the Wilmington and Western Railroad before reaching Prices Corner and an intersection with Newport Gap Pike, which heads northwest as DE 41 and southeast as DE 62. At this point, DE 2 passes to the north of the Prices Corner Shopping Center and has a junction with Albertson Boulevard; this road heads north to provide access to Greenbank Road which in turn leads east to Centerville Road. The road comes to a bridge over Centerville Road and heads north of a park and ride lot along Centerville Road before reaching a partial cloverleaf interchange with the DE 141 freeway. The DE 141 interchange includes a ramp from Centerville Road that merges with the ramp from northbound DE 141 to eastbound DE 2.

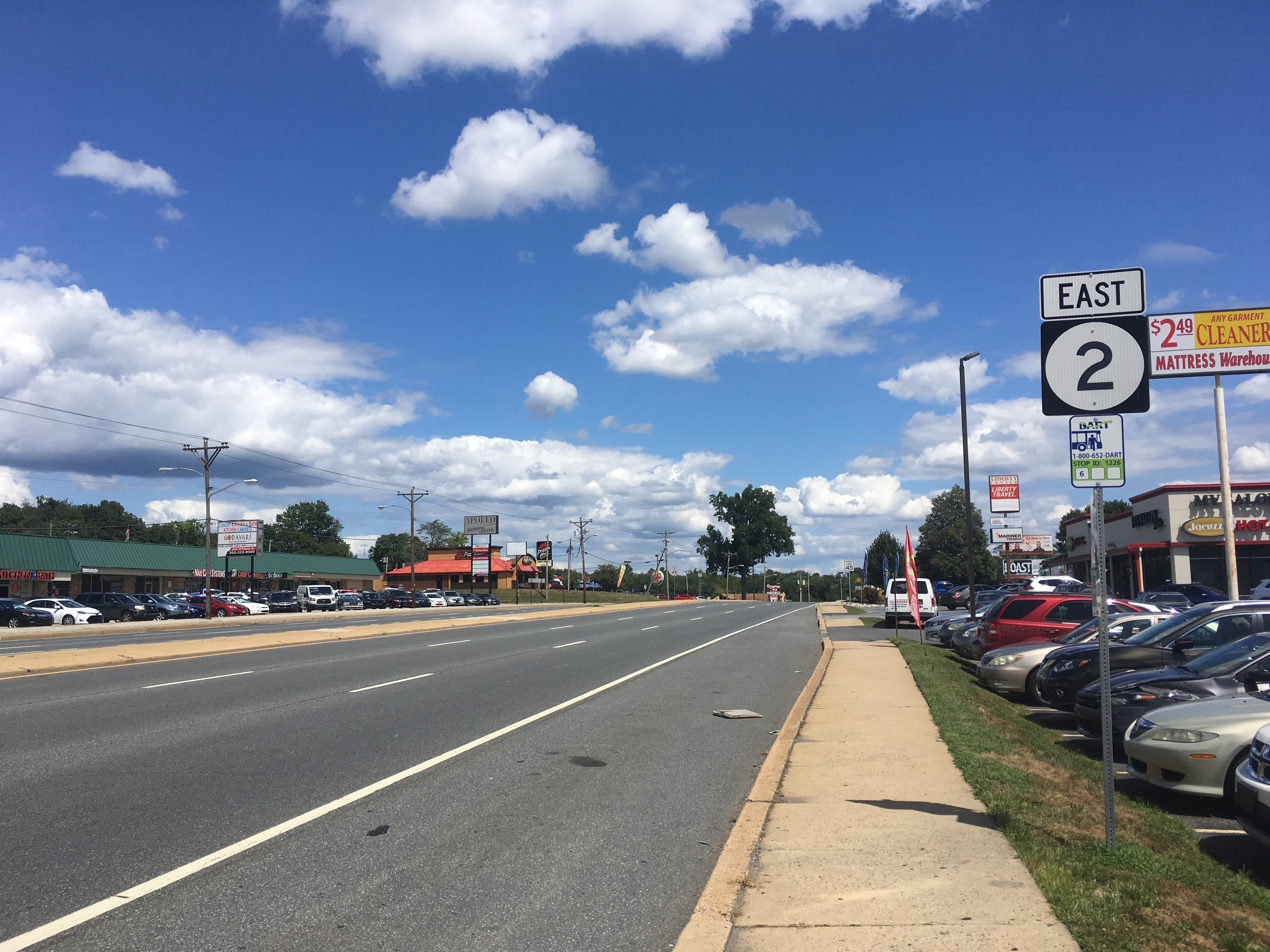
DE 2 eastbound on Kirkwood Highway in Marshallton

Following this interchange, DE 2 narrows to four lanes and continues east through a mix of homes and businesses, crossing Little Mill Creek and passing to the south of the Wilmington VA Medical Center before it heads across Chestnut Run. At this point, the route enters the town of Elsmere and briefly turns southeast before curving back to the east and reaching an intersection with DE 100 (Dupont Road). Past this intersection, the road comes to a bridge over a junction between CSX's Philadelphia Subdivision and an East Penn Railroad line and then CSX's Market Street Industrial Track line and South Grant Avenue before running past homes and businesses as South Union Street.

DE 2 leaves Elsmere and crosses into the city of Wilmington in the Canby Park Estates neighborhood. The road passes to the north of Canby Park, where it splits into the one-way pair of South Lincoln Street eastbound and South Union Street westbound and heads northeast. The one-way pair, which carries two lanes in each direction, passes urban homes and businesses and reaches an intersection with DE 48 (Lancaster Avenue) in the Union Park Gardens neighborhood. At this point, DE 2 becomes North Lincoln Street eastbound and North Union Street westbound, with the westbound direction forming a concurrency with westbound DE 48 between West 2nd Street and Lancaster Avenue. The highway enters the Little Italy neighborhood, where it intersects the northern terminus of DE 9 at West 4th Street. The route continues north to its eastern terminus at DE 52 (Pennsylvania Avenue) just east of where CSX's Philadelphia Subdivision railroad line passes over DE 52.

DE 2 has an annual average daily traffic count ranging from a high of 49,116 vehicles at the DE 141 interchange to a low of 19,009 vehicles at the DE 9 intersection. The entire length of DE 2 is part of the National Highway System.

== History ==
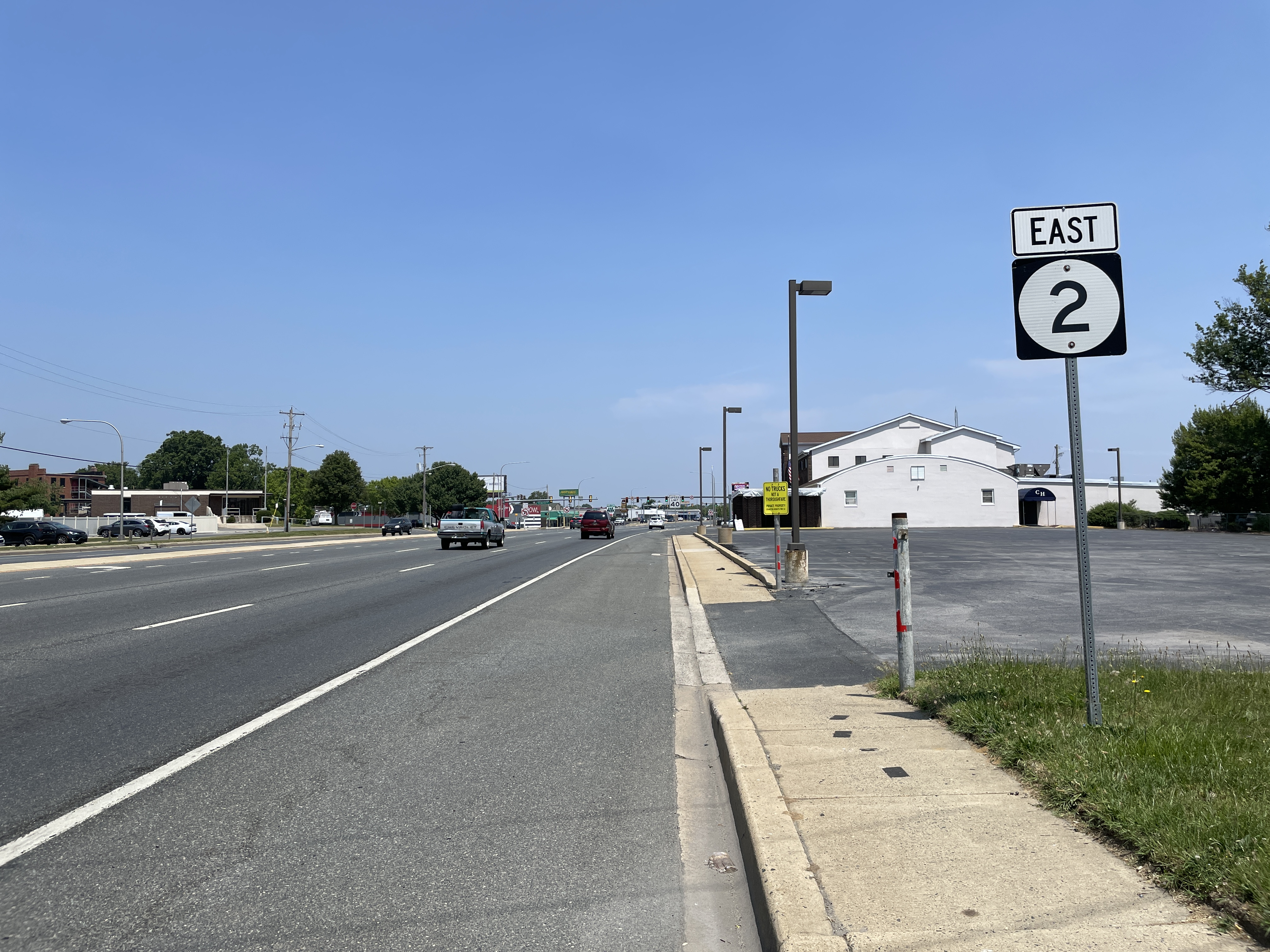
DE 2 eastbound past DE 41/DE 62 in Prices Corner

The portion of present-day DE 2 between Prices Corner and Wilmington was built in 1881 as New Road, connecting Greenbank Mill to Wilmington. The road that ran from the Maryland state line west of Newark and through Newark to Wilmington, which would later become DE 2, was originally a narrow and winding unpaved county road. Since the 1910s, this roadway became part of a branch of the Lincoln Highway, a name it would retain until 1938. The Lincoln Highway name continued northeast of Wilmington along the Philadelphia Pike, which is present-day U.S. Route 13 Business (US 13 Bus.) and US 13, to the Pennsylvania state line in Claymont. The highway between Newark and Wilmington also became known as the Capitol Trail as the travel corridor eventually led to the United States Capitol in Washington, D.C.; the trail further extended north to Philadelphia and south to Atlanta. By 1924, the roadway between the Maryland state line west of Newark and Wilmington was paved. In 1925, suggestions were made for the state to take over maintenance of the highway connecting the Maryland state line to Newark and Wilmington. The same year, recommendations were made to remove a grade crossing with a junction between the Reading Railroad (now the East Penn Railroad) and the Baltimore and Ohio Railroad (now CSX's Philadelphia Subdivision) in Elsmere. In 1927, the state took over maintenance of the highway between the Maryland state line and Wilmington via Newark. In November 1931, the Marshallton Cutoff was opened, bypassing the narrow and winding route through the community of Marshallton. This section included a through plate girder bridge over the Red Clay Creek. In the 1930s, plans were made to build a divided highway alignment of the Capitol Trail between Wilmington and Stanton, including a bypass of Marshallton, as a result of the construction of the Delaware Park racetrack, which opened in 1937.

In 1936, DE 2 was designated to run from the Maryland state line southwest of Newark, where it connected to MD 279, east to DE 52 in Wilmington, following Elkton Road, Main Street, Capitol Trail, New Road, and Union Street. In 1938, construction began on widening DE 2 into a divided highway between Prices Corner and Elsmere, with plans to extend the divided highway westward to bypass the two-lane section through Marshallton to the north along a new alignment. In 1939, the divided highway alignment of DE 2 was completed between DE 7 and Elsmere, with the exception of the bridge over the Red Clay Creek in Cranston Heights. This bridge was finished in 1940, completing the improvement of DE 2 into a divided highway between DE 7 and Elsmere. The new divided highway routing of DE 2 was extended west from DE 7 to Pike Creek Road in 1941. The bypassed former alignment of the route between Pike Creek Road and Prices Corner became known as Old Capitol Trail. On May 9, 1941, the new alignment of DE 2 between Pike Creek Road and the east end of New Road in Elsmere was named the Robert Kirkwood Highway in honor of Robert Kirkwood, an American Revolutionary War soldier from Newark. The portion of the route between DE 273 and Pike Creek Road retained the name Capitol Trail.

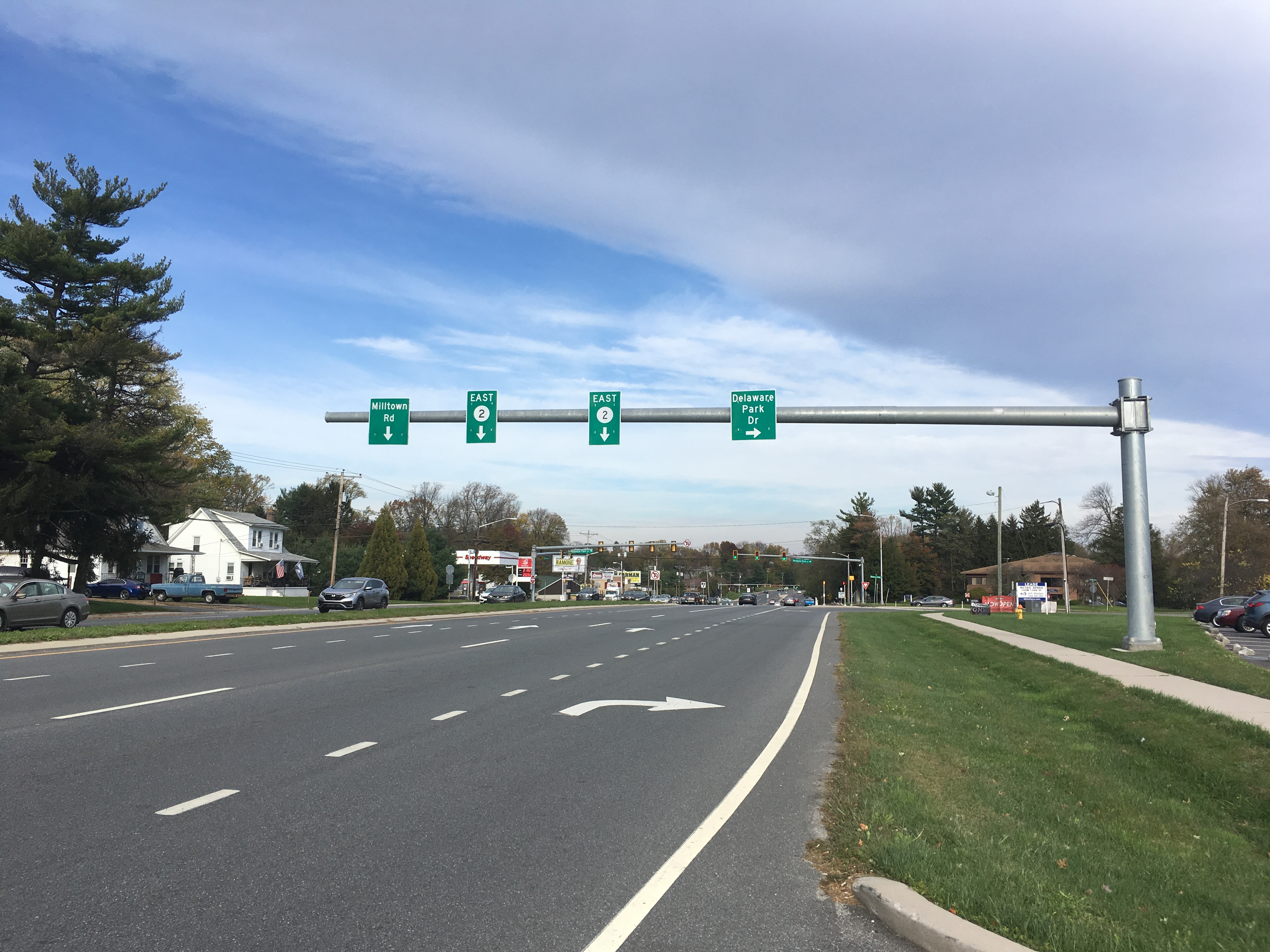
DE 2 eastbound between Newark and Wilmington

In 1940, plans were made to eliminate the grade crossing with the railroad junction in Elsmere by replacing it with a bridge over the tracks along with a new alignment for DE 2 between the end of the divided highway in Elsmere and Union and Lincoln streets in Wilmington. Due to World War II and steel shortages, construction of the bridge was delayed until after the war. In December 1949, the bridge carrying the route over the Reading Railroad and the Baltimore and Ohio Railroad in Elsmere was opened to traffic, with final work on the bridge finished in 1950.

In 1956, DE 2 and DE 273 were routed onto the one-way pair of Delaware Avenue eastbound and Main Street westbound in downtown Newark following an eastward extension of Delaware Avenue to the intersection between DE 2 and DE 273 east of the city. In 1957, work began to widen DE 2 into a four-lane divided highway between the Baltimore and Ohio Railroad (now CSX's Philadelphia Subdivision) bridge in Newark and DE 7. The divided highway was extended west from DE 7 to Red Mill Road by 1959. Also by this time, the route was split into a one-way pair in Wilmington on Union Street and Lincoln Street. The road between Newark and Red Mill Road became a divided highway by 1964. The portion of DE 2 along Elkton Road between the Maryland state line and Newark was widened into a divided highway in 1972.

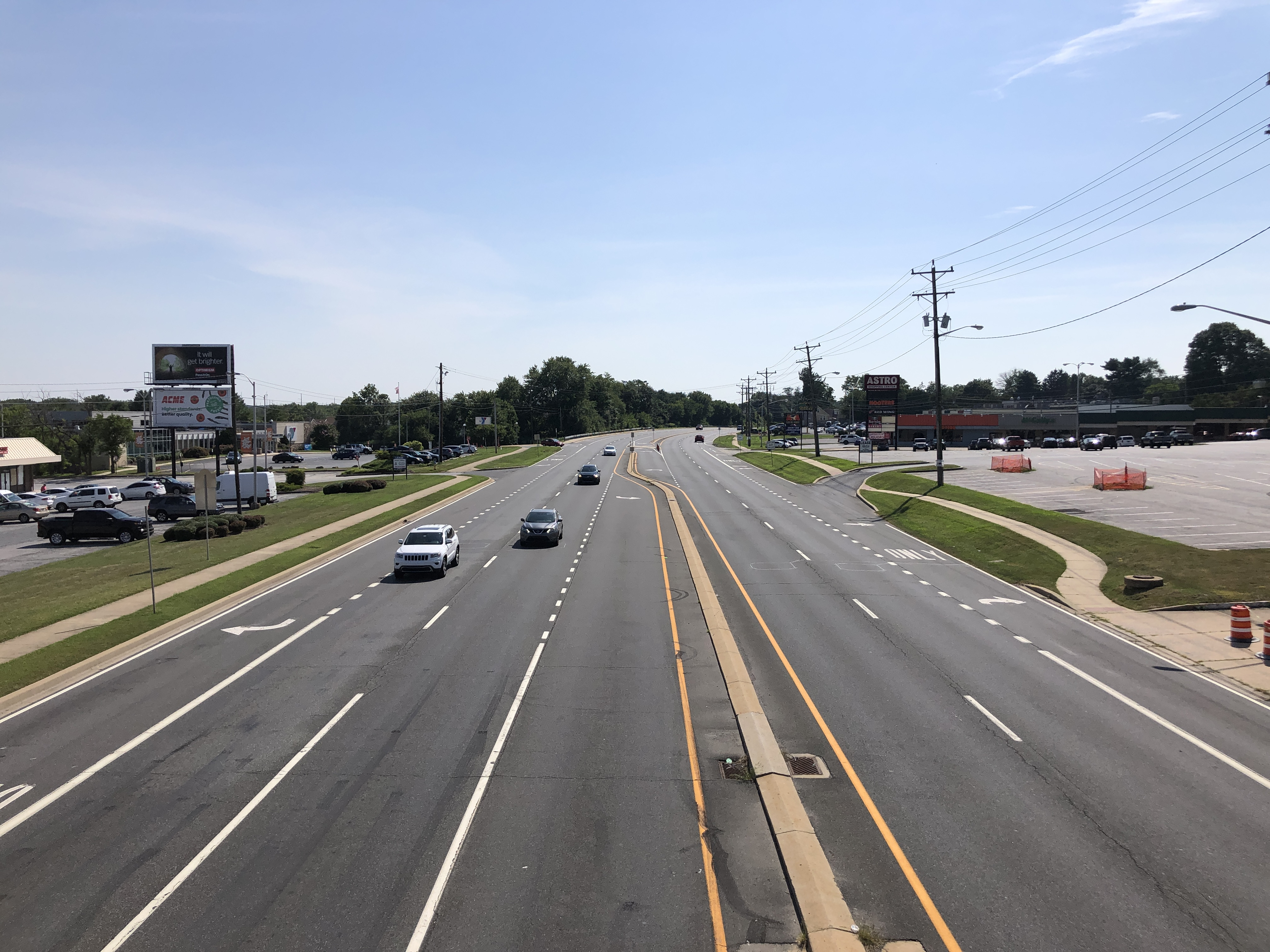
DE 2 westbound east of Newark

The Christiana Parkway around the southern edge of Newark was completed in September 1983. By 1990, DE 2 was realigned to bypass Newark along Christiana Parkway, which also carried portions of DE 4 and DE 896, Chestnut Hill Road, which also carried DE 4, and South Chapel Street and Library Avenue, which was also DE 72. With this realignment, the former route through Newark became DE 2 Bus. In 2013, the Delaware Department of Transportation (DelDOT) proposed the renumbering of routes in and around Newark. The plan called for DE 2 to start at DE 273 (Main Street) east of Newark instead of at the Maryland state line as well as the removal of the DE 2 Bus. designation through Newark. In addition, the portion of Elkton Road between the Maryland state line and DE 4/DE 896 (Christiana Parkway) was to be designated as DE 279. The goal of the project was to "simplify the route designations in Newark, reduce sign clutter, and reduce sign maintenance costs." The changes were completed in the middle part of 2013. In September 2015, the concurrency with DE 41 in Prices Corner was removed when the southern terminus of DE 41 was cut back from the interchange with DE 141 to the intersection with DE 2 and DE 62.

== Major intersections ==
The entire route is in New Castle County.

Location	mi	km	Destinations	Notes
Newark	0.00	0.00	DE 72 south (Library Avenue) to I-95; DE 273 (Ogletown Road/East Main Street) – Ogletown	Western terminus; west end of DE 72 overlap
Newark	1.21	1.95	DE 72 north (Possum Park Road)	East end of DE 72 overlap
Marshallton	5.17	8.32	DE 7 (Limestone Road) – Stanton, Christiana, Dover	
Prices Corner	6.92	11.14	DE 41 north / DE 62 east (Newport Gap Pike) – Avondale, Lancaster	Southern terminus of DE 41; western terminus of DE 62
Prices Corner	7.50	12.07	DE 141 to I-95 – Newport, Fairfax	DE 141 exit 6
Elsmere	9.19	14.79	DE 100 (Dupont Road)	
Wilmington	10.08	16.22	DE 48 (Lancaster Avenue) to I-95	West end of westbound overlap with DE 48 westbound
Wilmington			DE 48 west (West 2nd Street)	East end of westbound overlap with DE 48 westbound
Wilmington	10.43	16.79	DE 9 south (West 4th Street)	Northern terminus of DE 9
Wilmington	10.81	17.40	DE 52 (Pennsylvania Avenue)	Eastern terminus
1.000 mi = 1.609 km; 1.000 km = 0.621 mi: Concurrency terminus

== Delaware Route 2 Business ==
Delaware Route 2 Business
- Location: Newark
- Length: 2.91 mi (4.68 km)
- Existed: 1990–2013

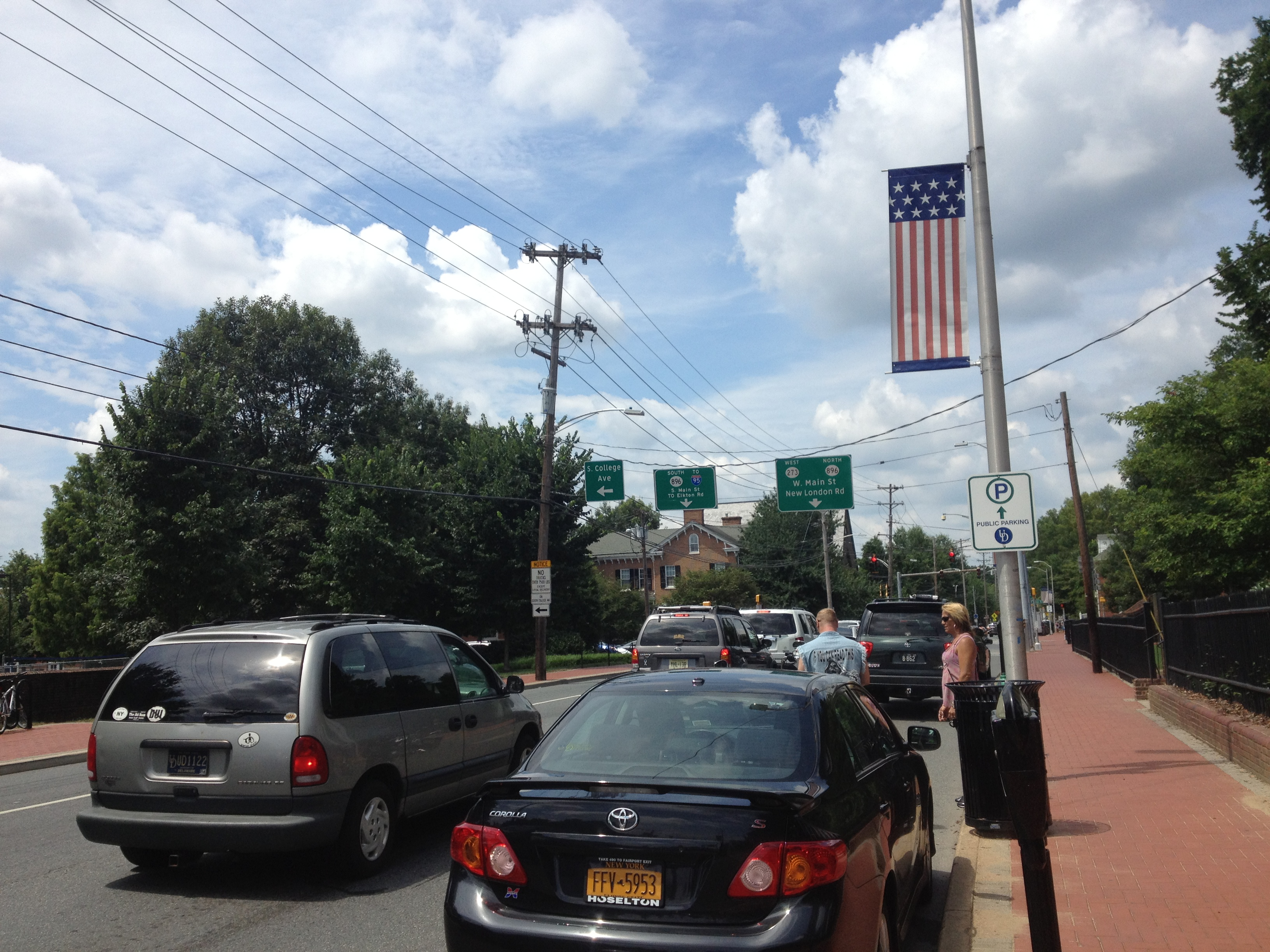
DE 2 Bus./DE 273 westbound along Main Street in Newark approaching College Avenue in 2013

Delaware Route 2 Business (DE 2 Bus.) was a 2.91-mile (4.68 km) long business route of DE 2 that ran through the city of Newark. The business route ran northeast from its western terminus at an intersection with DE 2/DE 4/DE 896 southwest of downtown Newark along four-lane divided Elkton Road, concurrent with DE 896. From this point, DE 2 Bus./DE 896 crossed the Christina River and headed into residential areas. The road changed names to South Main Street and became undivided as it passed businesses before reaching downtown Newark. Here, DE 2 Bus./DE 896 intersected DE 273, with the road splitting into a one-way pair. Eastbound DE 2 Bus./northbound DE 896 ran concurrent with eastbound DE 273 on West Delaware Avenue, heading to the east, while westbound DE 2 Bus./southbound DE 896 remained along South Main Street, also concurrent with eastbound DE 273. The one-way pair carried two lanes in each direction. Westbound DE 2 Bus. entered South Main Street from West Main Street, which also carried the westbound direction of DE 273 and the northbound direction of DE 896. At the intersection with South College Avenue, the concurrency in both directions with northbound DE 896 ended. DE 2 Bus./DE 273 passed through the University of Delaware campus and continued through the commercial downtown as East Delaware Avenue eastbound and East Main Street westbound. Farther east, the one-way pair crossed the Pomeroy and Newark Rail Trail and passed the Newark Transit Hub serving DART First State buses, which is located between East Main Street and East Delaware Avenue. East Delaware Avenue shifted farther to the south of East Main Street, with the one-way streets running between a residential neighborhood and East Delaware Avenue heading to the north of Newark High School. Past here, the route came to an intersection with DE 2/DE 72. At this point, DE 2 Bus. ended and eastbound DE 273 headed north with DE 2/DE 72 to rejoin westbound DE 273.

The business route was created by 1990 when DE 2 was routed to bypass Newark to the south. In 2012, the Newark city council voted in favor of renaming the portion of Elkton Road carrying DE 2 Bus./DE 896 between West Park Place and West Main Street to South Main Street in order to promote businesses along this stretch of road. The change went into effect January 1, 2013. DE 2 Bus. was decommissioned in 2013 as part of changes that also truncated the western terminus of DE 2 to the intersection with DE 72 and DE 273 in the eastern part of Newark.

Major intersections
The entire route was in Newark, New Castle County.

mi	km	Destinations	Notes
0.00	0.00	DE 2 / DE 4 east / DE 896 south (Elkton Road/Christina Parkway) to I-95 south	Western terminus; west end of DE 896 overlap
1.52	2.45	DE 273 west (West Main Street) DE 896 north (New London Road)	West end of DE 273 overlap
1.71	2.75	DE 896 (South College Avenue)	East end of DE 896 overlap
2.91	4.68	DE 2 / DE 72 (Capitol Trail/Library Avenue) DE 273 east (Ogletown Road)	Eastern terminus; east end of DE 273 overlap
1.000 mi = 1.609 km; 1.000 km = 0.621 mi: Concurrency terminus
