= Delaware Route 41 =

Highway in Delaware, United States

Delaware Route 41
- DE 41 highlighted in red

Route information
- Maintained by DelDOT
- Length: 6.19 mi (9.96 km)
- Existed: 1936–present

Major junctions
- South end: DE 2 / DE 62 in Prices Corner
- DE 48 in Hockessin
- North end: PA 41 near Hockessin

Location
- Country: United States
- State: Delaware
- Counties: New Castle

Highway system
- Delaware State Route System; List; Byways
← US 40	→ DE 42

Delaware Route 41 (DE 41) is a highway in northwestern New Castle County, Delaware. Its southern terminus is at DE 2 and DE 62 in Prices Corner. From DE 2, the road passes through suburban areas along Newport Gap Pike, intersecting DE 48 in Hockessin and becoming Lancaster Pike. Its northern terminus is the Pennsylvania state line just north of Hockessin, and the road continues on as Pennsylvania Route 41 (PA 41) to Gap.

DE 41 was originally chartered as the Gap and Newport Turnpike in the 19th century. In the 1920s and 1930s, this road was upgraded to a state highway. DE 41 was designated by 1936 to run from U.S. Route 40 (US 40, now DE 9/DE 273) in New Castle north to the Pennsylvania border in Hockessin. In the 1950s, DE 141 became concurrent with the route from New Castle to north of Newport. DE 41 was removed from the DE 141 concurrency in the 1970s and was realigned to follow DE 2 east to an interchange with DE 141 in the 1980s, with the old alignment south of DE 2 becoming part of DE 62. In 2015, the southern terminus was cut back to its current location, removing the concurrency with DE 2.

== Route description ==
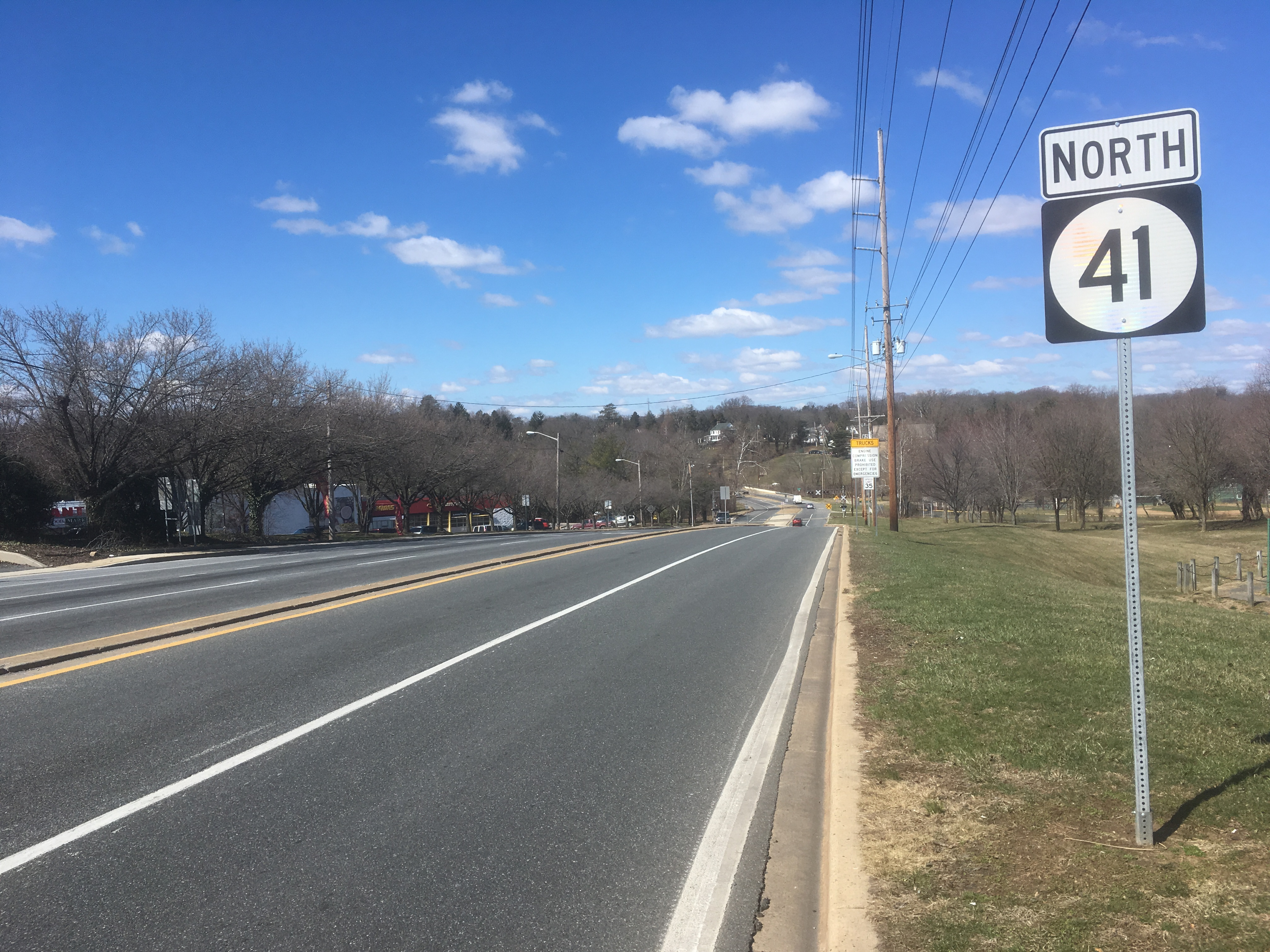
DE 41 northbound past its southern terminus at DE 2 and DE 62 in Prices Corner

DE 41 begins at an intersection with DE 2 (Kirkwood Highway) in Prices Corner, heading northwest along Newport Gap Pike. South of DE 2, Newport Gap Pike continues southeast as DE 62. DE 41 is a two-lane divided highway before it crosses the Wilmington and Western Railroad at-grade south of Greenbank station and the Red Clay Creek in Greenbank. The route becomes an undivided road and continues through a mix of residential neighborhoods and woodland. The road crosses Hyde Run and comes to an intersection with Faulkland Road west of Brandywine Springs Park. Past this junction, DE 41 continues northwest as a two-lane undivided highway, crossing Hyde Run again, and heads towards Hockessin, with stretches of divided highway around the intersections with Millcreek Road/Hercules Road and McKennans Church Road/Loveville Road.

DE 41 (Lancaster Pike) southbound in Hockessin

In Hockessin, DE 41 meets the western terminus of DE 48 (Lancaster Pike) and merges onto Lancaster Pike. The Lancaster Pike alternates between a divided highway and a two-lane undivided road. DE 41 turns to the west-northwest and passes to the northeast of the Sanford School before it crosses Brackenville Road. At this intersection, the road widens to three lanes, with a northbound truck lane for a short distance as it ascends a hill, before narrowing back to two lanes. The route enters business areas and becomes a three-lane divided highway, with the southbound direction gaining a truck lane as it descends a hill. The median turns into a center left-turn lane as the road runs past more developments and crosses the Wilmington and Western Railroad again at-grade. The route comes to the Yorklyn Road intersection, where the southbound direction narrows to one lane. The road briefly becomes a divided highway at the Valley Road junction and crosses Mill Creek, leaving the center of Hockessin. On the western corner of this intersection is the Elsie Walker Rest Area, a small park that serves as a picnic area. Past the Valley Road intersection, the route widens to three lanes, with a truck lane in the northbound direction as it climbs a hill. The road passes homes, eventually narrowing back to two lanes. DE 41 reaches the Pennsylvania state line, where Gap Newport Pike continues northwest as PA 41.

DE 41 serves as part of the main route connecting Wilmington, Delaware, to Lancaster, Pennsylvania, and sees heavy truck traffic. DE 41 has an annual average daily traffic count ranging from a high of 22,650 vehicles at the Old Lancaster Road intersection to a low of 10,332 vehicles at the McKennans Church Road/Loveville Road intersection. The entire length of DE 41 is part of the National Highway System.

== History ==
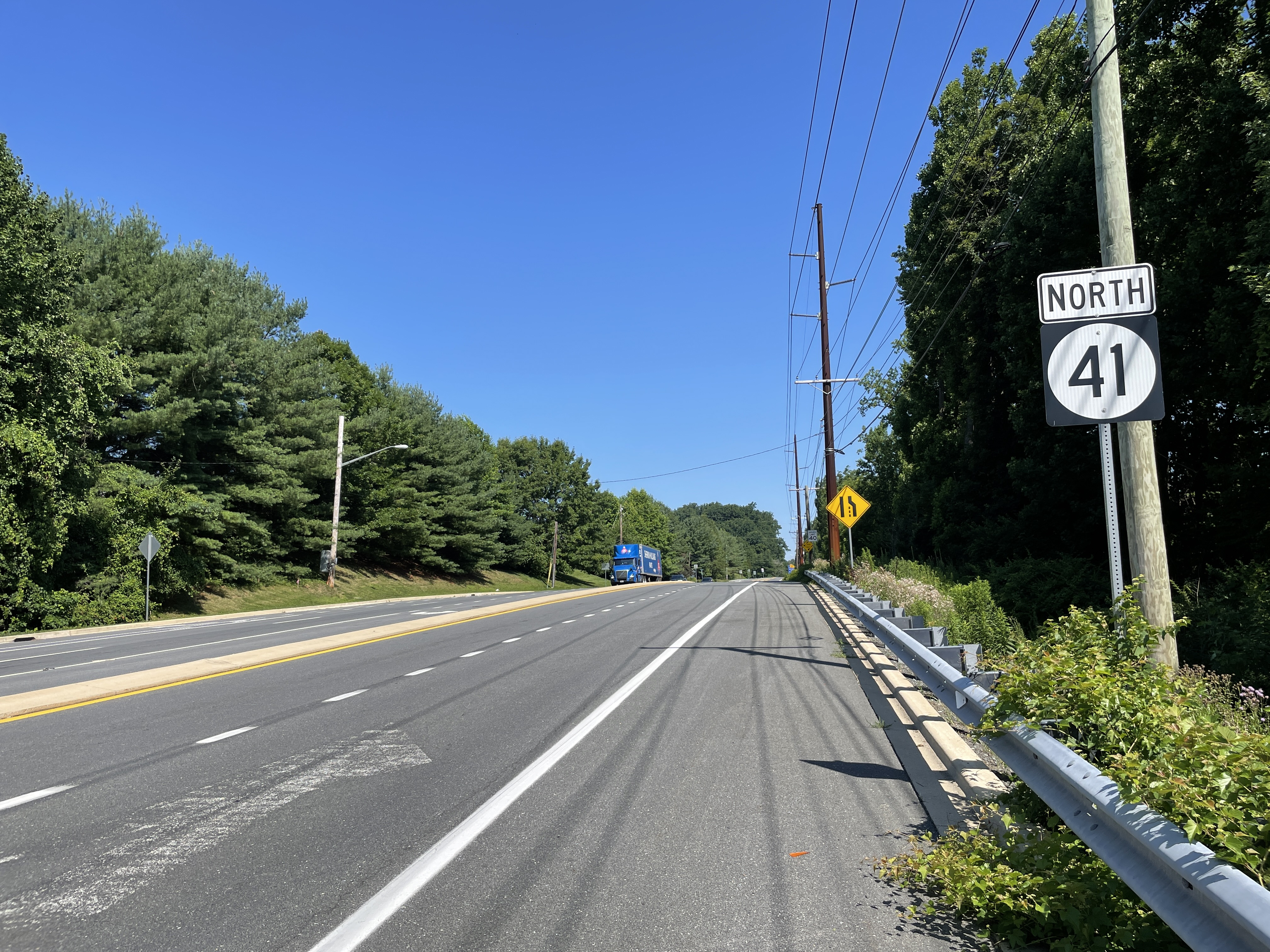
DE 41 northbound between Prices Corner and Hockessin

What is now DE 41 was originally chartered as the Gap and Newport Turnpike on January 30, 1808, an extension of the 1807-chartered turnpike in Pennsylvania that was to run from Gap, Pennsylvania, southeast to Newport, Delaware. Construction of the Gap and Newport Turnpike began in 1809 and was completed in 1818. By 1920, this road was maintained by the county. The road north of Lancaster Pike was proposed as a state highway four years later. A year later, a state highway was completed on what would become DE 41 between New Castle and Prices Corner. Plans were underway in 1927 to replace the outdated swing bridge over the Christina River in Newport. Contracts for this project were awarded the following year. The replacement bridge over the Christina River, a bascule bridge, opened on December 1, 1929. In 1927, plans were made to replace the grade crossing at the Pennsylvania Railroad line (now Amtrak's Northeast Corridor) in Newport with an underpass under the tracks. Work on this underpass began in 1929. The crossing under the Pennsylvania Railroad was finished and opened to traffic in June 1930. In 1929, the Gap Road was upgraded to a state highway.

DE 41 was designated to run from US 40 (now DE 9/DE 273) in New Castle north to PA 41 at the Pennsylvania state line in Hockessin by 1936. It followed Basin Road north to Newport, James Street through Newport, and the Newport Gap Pike north of there. By 1952, DE 141 was designated to run concurrent with DE 41 from New Castle to north of Newport. In 1954, plans were made to replace the intersection with US 13/US 40/US 202 in Basin Corner with a modified cloverleaf interchange in an effort to reduce traffic congestion. Construction on the interchange began in September of that year. The interchange between US 13/US 40/US 202 and DE 41/DE 141 was completed in 1956.

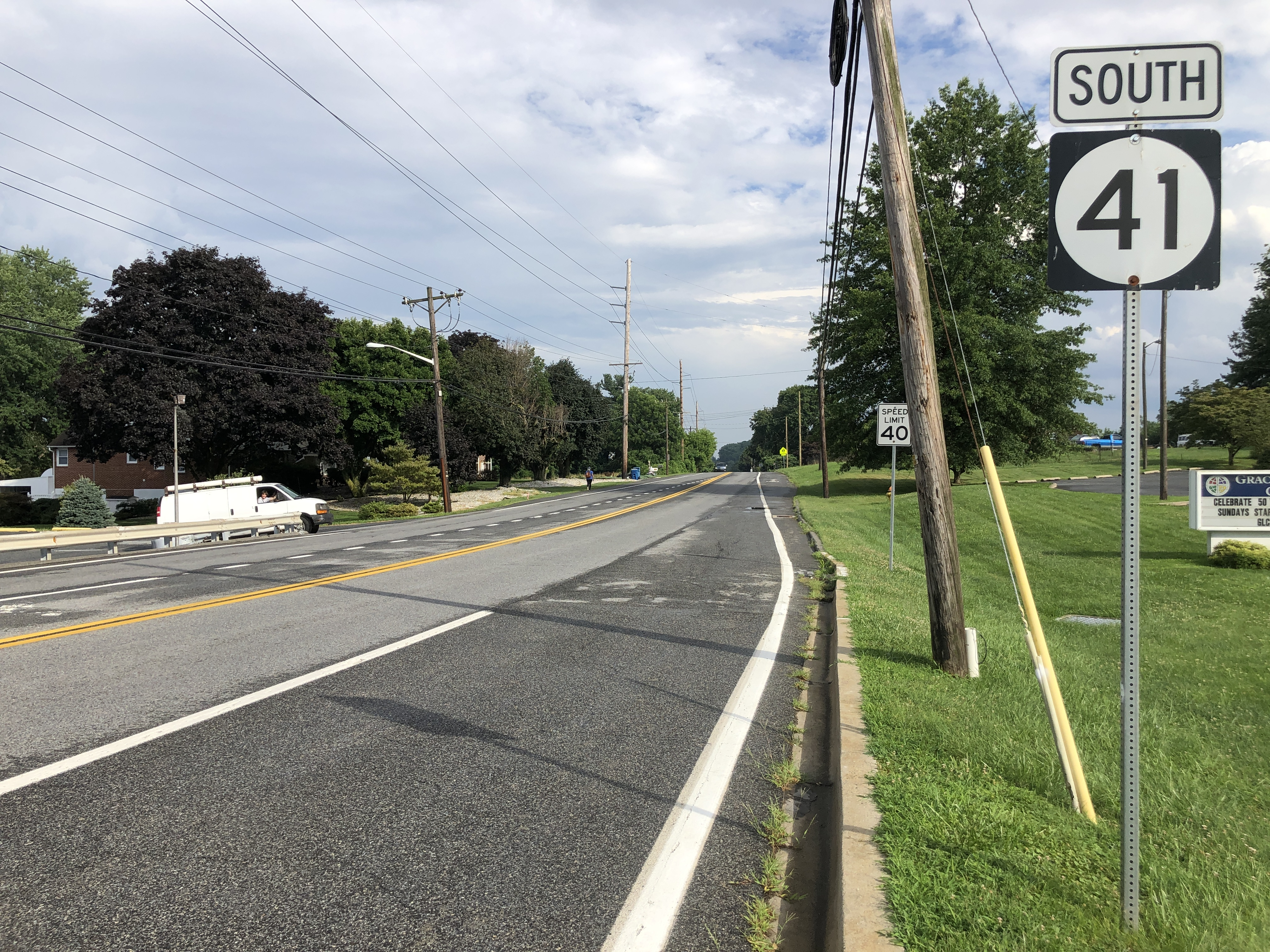
DE 41 southbound past DE 48 near Hockessin

In April 1954, work began to improve DE 41 between the DE 48 intersection and the Pennsylvania state line. These improvements constructed a bypass of Hockessin and added truck lanes on steep grades. This project was scheduled for completion in July 1955. The former alignment of the route through Hockessin became Old Lancaster Pike. The new northbound lanes of DE 41/DE 141 through the I-95 interchange opened in November 1962, at which point construction on the southbound lanes began. The southbound lanes of DE 41/DE 141 opened in June 1964, enabling directional flow of DE 41/DE 141 through the interchange.

The southern terminus of DE 41 was truncated to DE 141 north of Newport by 1971, eliminating the concurrency with that route. By 1981, DE 41 was realigned to follow DE 2 to end at an interchange with DE 141, with DE 62 being designated along the former DE 41 south of DE 2. In 2015, the Delaware Department of Transportation proposed cutting back the southern terminus of DE 41 from the interchange with DE 141 to the intersection with DE 2 and DE 62, eliminating the concurrency with DE 2, and also eliminating signage for DE 41 along DE 141. This change was made in order to reduce sign clutter and also reduce truck traffic along the southern portion of DE 41 by directing truck traffic to use DE 141 and DE 48 instead to reach DE 41. A public workshop on the proposal was held and changes were made in September 2015.

== Major intersections ==
The entire route is in New Castle County.

Location	mi	km	Destinations	Notes
Prices Corner	0.00	0.00	DE 2 (Kirkwood Highway) – Wilmington, Newark DE 62 east (Newport Gap Pike)	Southern terminus of DE 41; western terminus of DE 62
Hockessin	3.44	5.54	DE 48 east (Lancaster Pike)	Western terminus of DE 48
Hockessin	6.19	9.96	PA 41 north (Gap Newport Pike) – Avondale, Lancaster	Pennsylvania state line; northern terminus of DE 41
1.000 mi = 1.609 km; 1.000 km = 0.621 mi
