= Prices Corners =

Prices Corners may refer to:

- A community within East Garafraxa, Dufferin County, Southern Ontario, Canada
- A community within Oro-Medonte, Simcoe County, Southern Ontario, Canada

== See also ==
- Prices Corner, Delaware, United States
