= Greenbank, Delaware =

Unincorporated community in Delaware, United States

- Unincorporated community
- Location within Delaware Location within the United States
- Coordinates: 39°44′20″N 75°38′9″W
- Country: United States
- State: Delaware
- County: New Castle
- Elevation: 105 ft (32 m)
- Time zone: UTC-5 (Eastern (EST))
  - Summer (DST): UTC-4 (EDT)
- ZIP code: 19808
- Area code: 302
- GNIS feature ID: 216915

Greenbank is an unincorporated community located west of Wilmington in New Castle County, Delaware, United States. It is located at the intersection of Delaware Route 41 and Greenbank Road.

Greenbank uses the Wilmington ZIP code of 19808. Locals refer to Greenbank as "Wilmington". There are several historical landmarks in Greenbank, such as the Wilmington and Western Railroad that operates tourist trains over the former Baltimore and Ohio Railroad line between Greenbank and Hockessin.

The Greenbank Historic Area includes the Greenbank Mill, Robert Phillips House, and W.G. Phillips House. The mill was constructed in 1790 and then expanded in 1812. The Robert Phillips House was erected sometime around 1783. The W.G. Phillips House, the former mill owner's house, was built in the early 1820s.
