= Belvedere, Delaware =

Unincorporated community in Delaware, United States

- Unincorporated community
- Location within Delaware Location within the United States
- Coordinates: 39°43′19″N 75°36′56″W
- Country: United States
- State: Delaware
- County: New Castle
- Elevation: 69 ft (21 m)
- Time zone: UTC-5 (Eastern (EST))
  - Summer (DST): UTC-4 (EDT)
- ZIP code: 19804
- Area code: 302
- GNIS feature ID: 213633

Belvedere is an unincorporated community in New Castle County, Delaware, United States. Belvedere is at the junction of state routes 62 and 141, north of Newport and south of Prices Corner, 7 miles (11 km) from downtown Wilmington. Belvedere uses the Wilmington ZIP code of 19804.

Belvedere is mostly made up of single-family homes and the commercial center is located along Newport Gap Pike. The community is served by the Belvedere Volunteer Fire Company. Police service in Belvedere is provided by the New Castle County Police Department. Students in the community attend public schools in the Red Clay Consolidated School District. Belvedere is near a Delaware Army National Guard armory and the former Wilmington Assembly plant used by General Motors. The community has five churches. The Belvedere State Service Center is located in the community, and is home to the Belvedere Senior Center, an art studio, gymnasium, and a state service center that offers social services.

Belvedere was founded in 1908 as a community that housed African Americans who worked in nearby factories. In recent years, the community has seen issues with drugs and crime.

DART First State provides bus service to Belvedere, with the Route 9 bus running through the community on its route between Prices Corner and Wilmington. The Wilmington train station is nearby in Wilmington and is served by Amtrak and SEPTA Regional Rail's Wilmington/Newark Line.
