= Delaware State Route System =

Overview of the State Route System of Delaware

- Route markers for Interstate 95, U.S. Route 13, and Delaware Route 1

- A map of state routes in the state of Delaware

System information
- Maintained by DelDOT, USACE, and DRBA
- Length: 5,386.14 mi (8,668.15 km)
- Formed: April 2, 1917, state route numbers signed by 1936

Highway names
- Interstates: Interstate X (I-X)
- US Highways: U.S. Route X (US X)
- State: Delaware Route X (DE X)
- Maintenance road numbers: Road X

System links
- Delaware State Route System; List; Byways

The Delaware State Route System consists of roads in the U.S. state of Delaware that are maintained by the Delaware Department of Transportation (DelDOT). The system includes the portions of the Interstate Highway System and United States Numbered Highways system located in the state along with state routes and other roads maintained by DelDOT. All roads maintained by the state are assigned a maintenance road number (reference number) that is only marked on little white markers at intersections and on auxiliary plates below warning signs approaching intersections. These numbers are only unique in a specific county; some roads can be designated with multiple road numbers, and numbers do not necessarily correspond to the signed Interstate, U.S., or state route numbers. DelDOT maintains a total of 5,386.14 miles (8,668.15 km) of roads, comprising 89 percent of the roads within the state. Some large bridges in the state are maintained by other agencies including the U.S. Army Corps of Engineers and the Delaware River and Bay Authority. Roads in the system include multilane freeways, multilane surface divided highways, and two-lane undivided roads serving urban, suburban, and rural areas. Some of the roads maintained by DelDOT are toll roads, in which motorists must pay to use.

The first roads in Delaware were Native American trails and unpaved roads laid out by colonial Swedish and English settlers. From this time, counties were responsible for roads. In the 19th century, private companies operated several turnpikes radiating from Wilmington. Thomas Coleman DuPont proposed a modern road in 1908 to run the north–south length of the state; this road evolved into the DuPont Highway, which was completed by the state in 1923. The Delaware State Highway Department was formed on April 2, 1917 to construct a state highway system in Delaware. Numbered routes came with the creation of the U.S. Highway System in 1926; state route numbers appeared 10 years later. In 1935, the state took over the remaining county roads. In the middle part of the 20th century, several major roads were widened into divided highways. The creation of the Interstate Highway System in 1956 led to the construction of 40 miles (64 km) of freeway in northern New Castle County, including the tolled Delaware Turnpike. The Delaware Route 1 (DE 1) limited-access toll road between Dover and Wilmington was fully completed in 2003, and was the largest public works project in state history.

== Numbering ==
=== Interstate and U.S. Routes ===
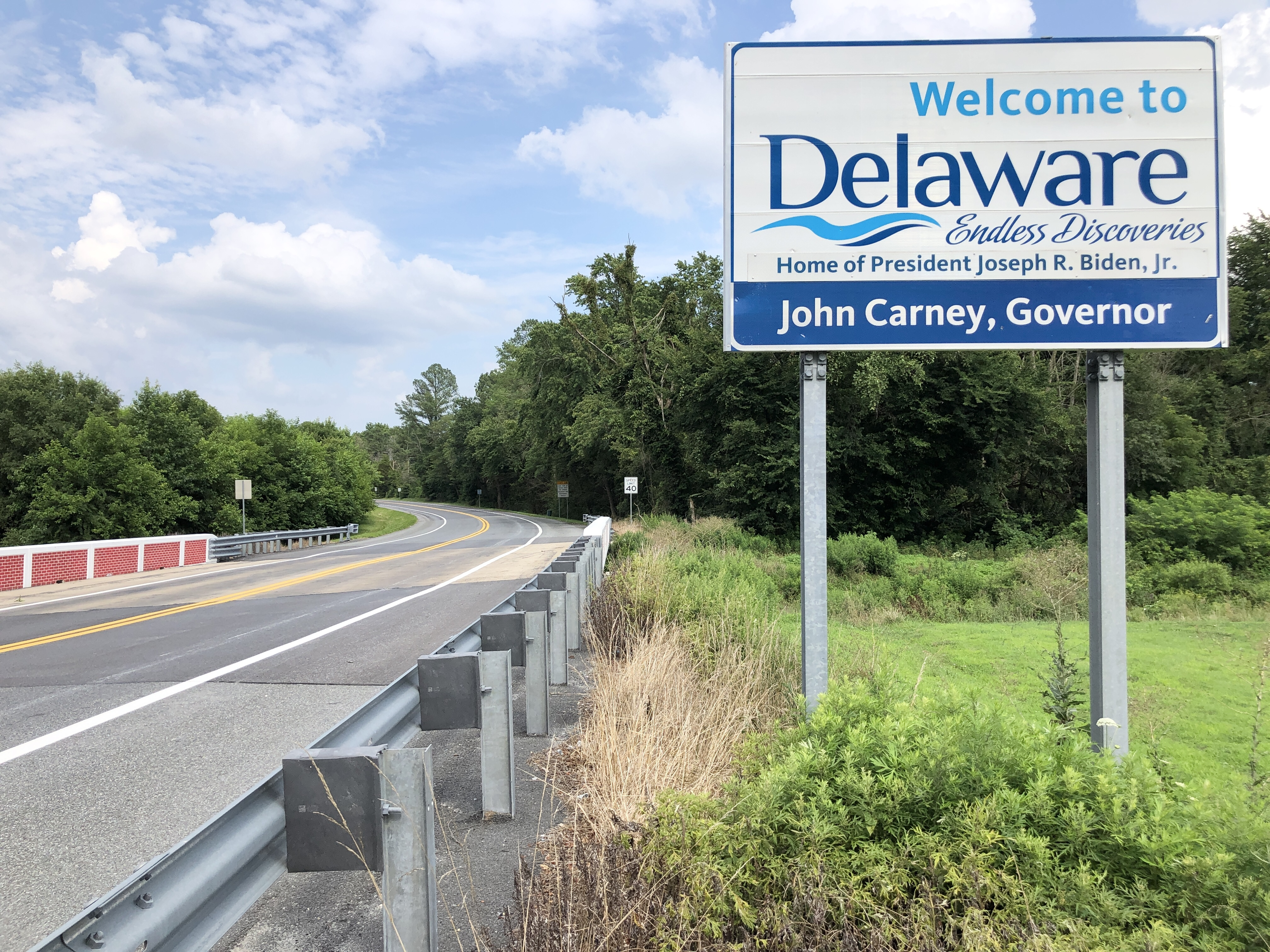
Welcome sign along DE 8

The Interstate Highways and U.S. Routes in Delaware are numbered according to a national numbering pattern. Interstate Highways that run north–south have odd numbers, increasing from west to east, while those that run east–west have even numbers, increasing from south to north. Major north–south Interstates have numbers ending in 5 while major east–west Interstates have numbers ending in 0. Three-digit Interstates begin with odd numbers if they are a spur and an even number if they are a bypass or beltway and repeat numbers in different states. As such, the major north–south Interstate along the East Coast, Interstate 95 (I-95), passes through northern New Castle County. I-495 bypasses the section of I-95 that runs through the city of Wilmington.

U.S. Routes that run north–south have odd numbers, increasing from east to west, while those that run east–west have even numbers, increasing from north to south. Major north–south U.S. Routes have numbers ending in 1 while major east–west U.S. Routes have numbers ending in 0. Three-digit U.S. Routes serve as branches of their parent route. As such, U.S. Route 13 (US 13) runs north–south through the entire length of Delaware while US 40, a major U.S. Route running from Utah to New Jersey, passes east–west through northern New Castle County. US 113 serves as a branch of US 13 in the southern part of the state. US 9 is an exception to the numbering pattern as it runs east–west across Sussex County, though the route runs north–south in New Jersey and New York.

=== State routes ===
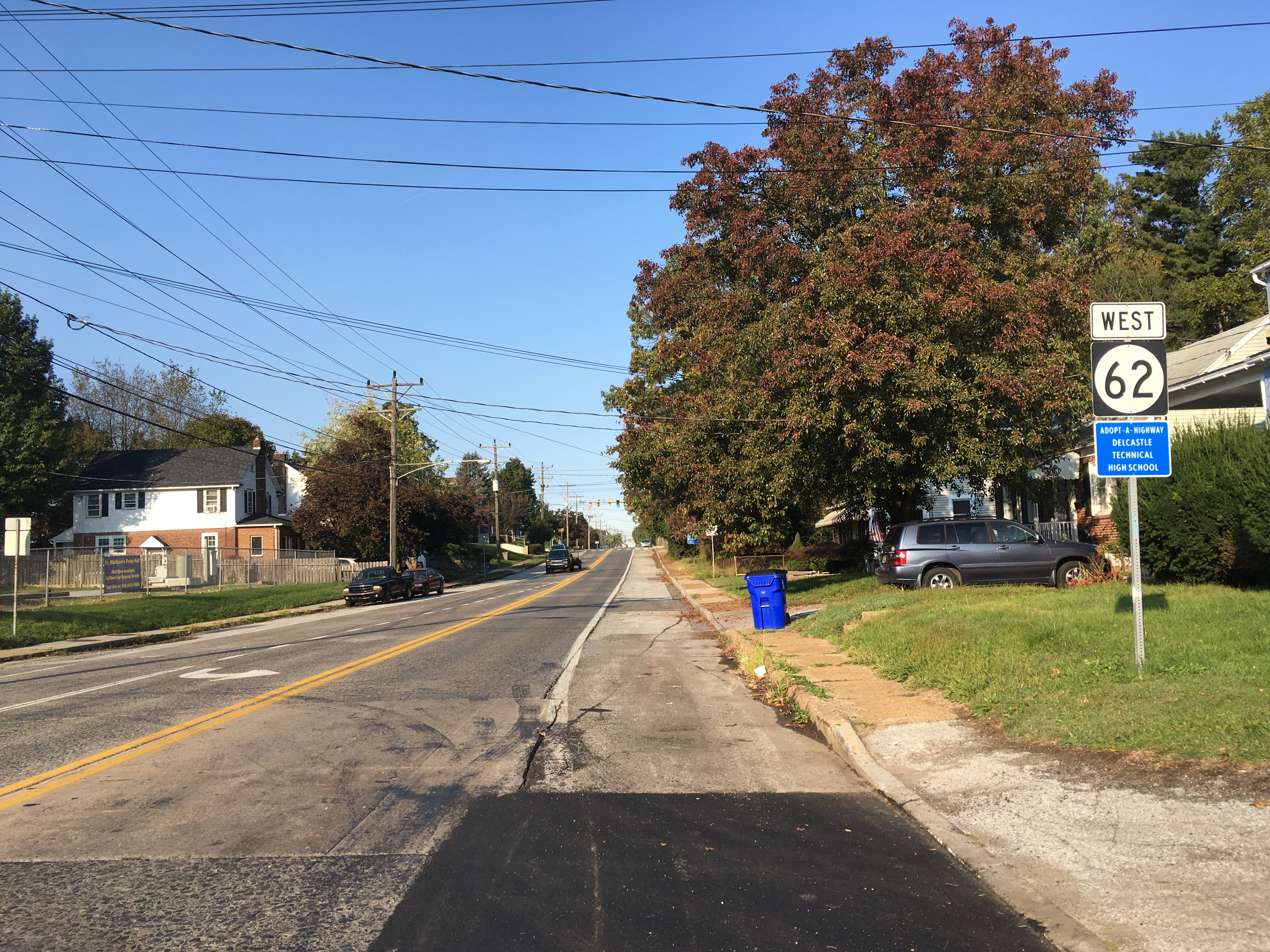
DE 62 running west from DE 4 near Newport

State routes in Delaware are signed with the MUTCD default circular route marker, which consists of black numbers in a white circle on a rectangular black background. These routes are largely assigned in a pattern similar to the Interstate and U.S. routes. Odd-numbered routes generally run north–south and even-numbered routes generally run east–west. A grid pattern exists for several low-numbered east–west state routes that increases from north to south, starting with DE 2 in northern Delaware and continuing south to DE 26 in the southern part of the state. There is also a pattern for some low-numbered north–south routes beginning with DE 1 in the east and continuing to DE 11 in the west. Several routes in Delaware are numbered as continuations of Maryland and Pennsylvania state routes, without regard to the even/odd pattern. Examples include DE 52, which is a southern continuation of PA 52, and DE 273, which is an eastern continuation of MD 273. DE 48 was once connected to Route 48 in New Jersey by a ferry across the Delaware River. Most of the 3-digit state routes are or were continuations of routes from Maryland and Pennsylvania, with the exception of DE 141 and DE 202. The lowest numbered state route is DE 1, while the highest numbered route is DE 896.

Unlike some other states, Delaware does not prohibit duplication between route numbers of different systems. There are two examples of duplication between U.S. and state routes within Delaware. US 9 exists in Sussex County while DE 9 is located in Kent and New Castle counties. US 202 passes through the Wilmington area in northern New Castle County, with DE 202 heading south from an interchange with I-95 and US 202 along Concord Avenue into the city of Wilmington. DE 202 is signed along a former alignment of US 202.

=== Maintenance road numbers ===
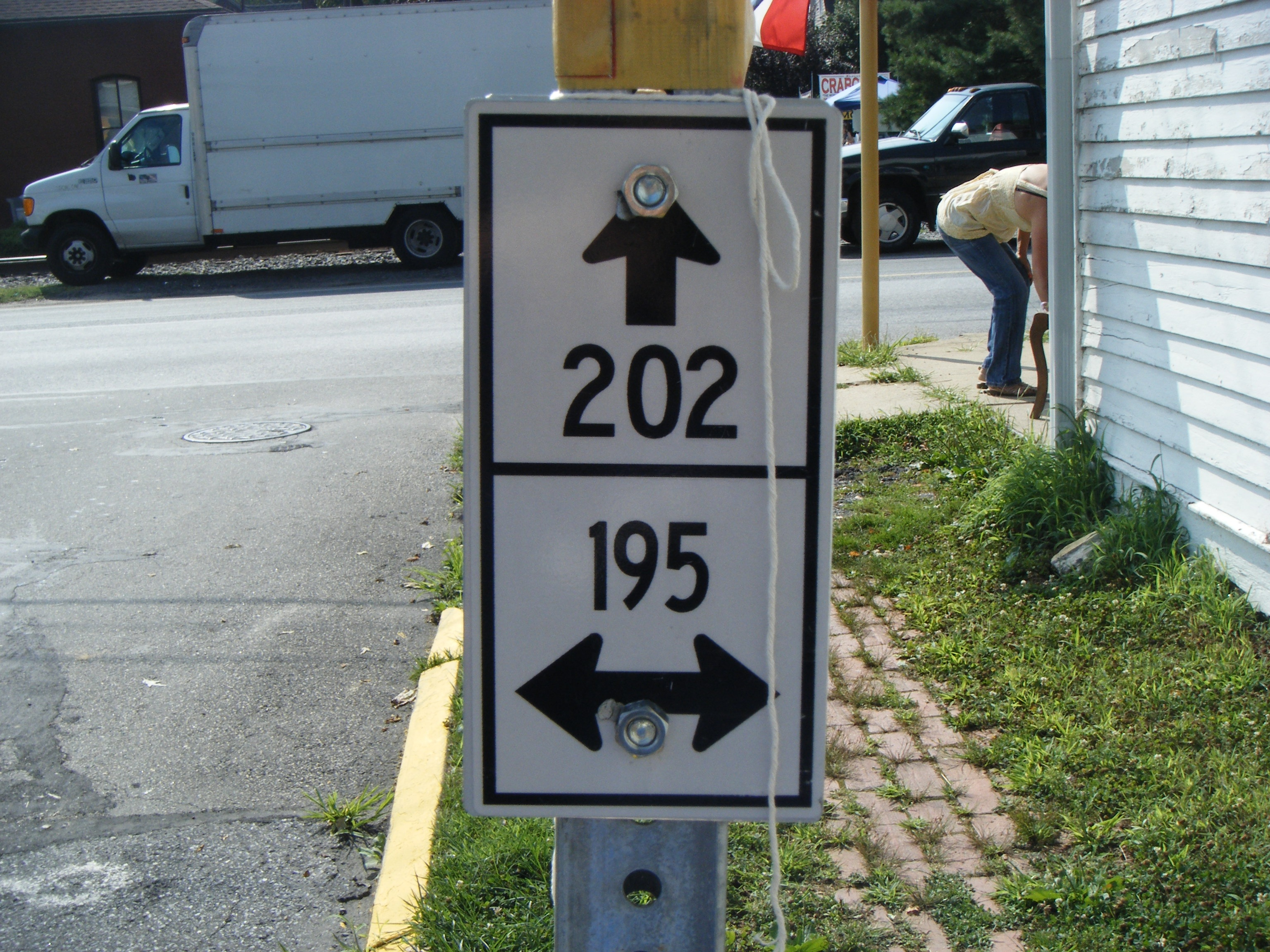
Sign at junction of Road 195 (DE 15) and Road 202 in the town of Wyoming

Every road that is maintained by DelDOT, including Interstate, U.S., and state routes, is assigned a maintenance road number (also known as a reference number). The maintenance road numbers are only unique in a specific county and some roads can be designated with multiple road numbers. For example, Bryants Corner Road in Kent County is designated as Road 205, Road 103, and Road 219. Suffixed maintenance road numbers exist near their parent roads, often for a short alignment. For example, Woodland Ferry Road in Sussex County is designated Road 78, while Old Sailor Road, a short road branching off from it near Laurel, is designated as Road 78A. The maintenance road numbers are signed with little white markers at intersections showing the two roads that intersect each other and on auxiliary plates below warning signs approaching intersections.

Interstate, U.S., and state routes have maintenance road numbers that often do not match their signed route numbers. For instance, DE 261 in New Castle County is designated as Road 203. In Sussex County, several state routes largely have matching maintenance road numbers; for example, the entire length of DE 24 is designated Road 24. Some routes in Sussex County have maintenance road numbers that reflect former route designations; an example is the section of US 9 between Laurel and Georgetown which is designated Road 28, reflecting the former DE 28 designation along this stretch of road.

== Highway systems ==
The Delaware State Route System includes Delaware's portion of the Interstate Highway System and U.S. Highway System along with state routes. The system also includes special routes of the U.S. and state routes, such as alternate, business, and truck routes. These routes consist of a banner denoting the type of special route above the route marker. Alternate routes provide a second alignment of a route between two points. DE 10 Alternate provides an alternate routing to DE 10 between Willow Grove and Rising Sun by passing through Woodside while DE 10 passes through Camden. Business routes pass through the business area of a city while the main route bypasses it. DE 1 Business passes through the central portion of Milford while DE 1 bypasses the city to the east. Truck routes provide an alternate route for trucks around a certain portion of a route. DE 14 Truck provides a route for truck traffic that bypasses the section of DE 14 that passes through Harrington. Suffixed routes also exist for short alignments that branch off their parent routes, in which a letter suffix is added after the route number. DE 1 has three suffixed routes in the Rehoboth Beach area while DE 9A provides access to the Port of Wilmington from DE 9. In addition to these systems are other state roads designated with a maintenance road number.

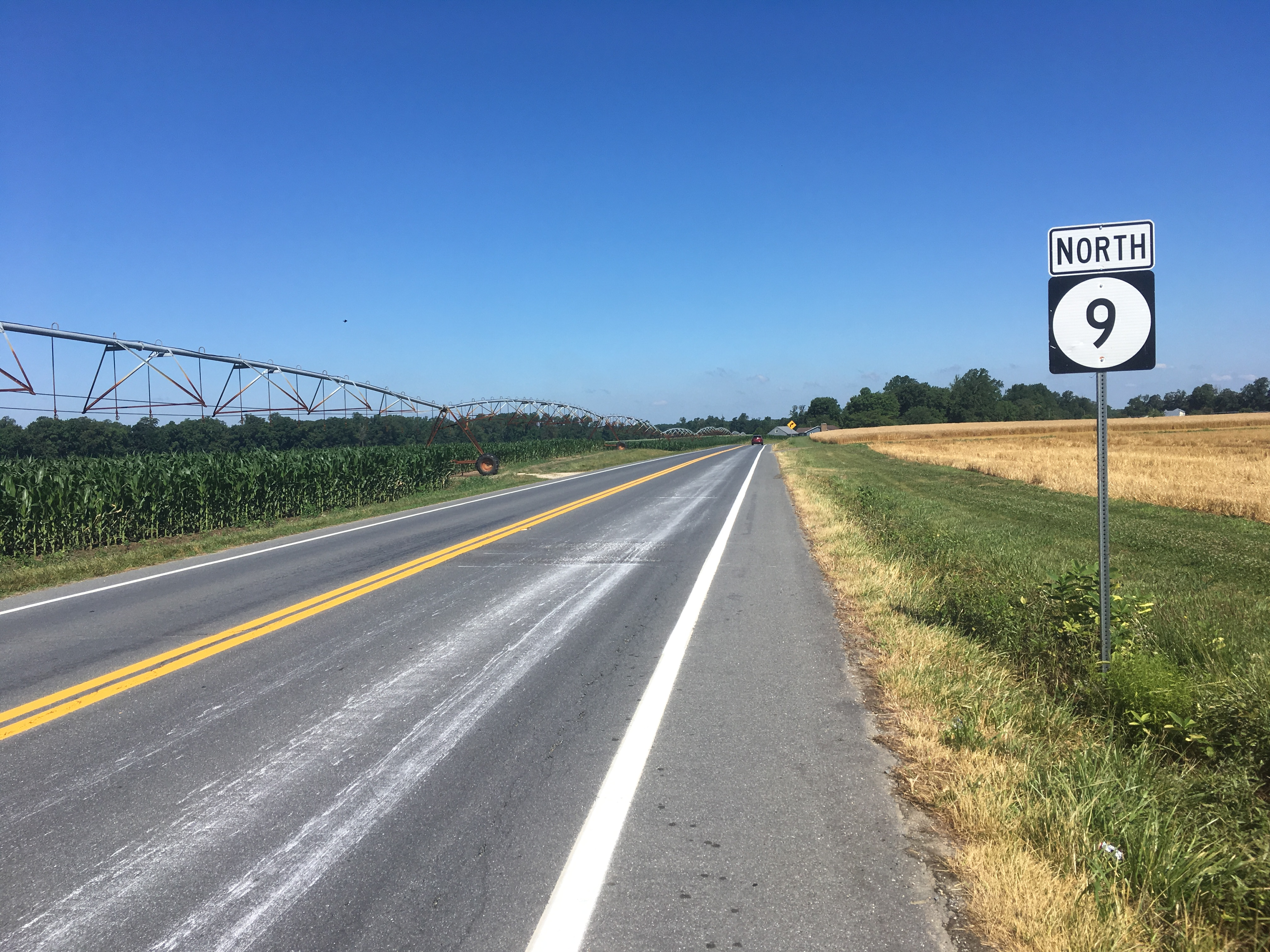
DE 9 northbound between Little Creek and Leipsic

DelDOT maintains a total of 5,386.14 miles (8,668.15 km) of state roads within Delaware, which comprises 89 percent of all roadway mileage in the state. Some exceptions to DelDOT maintenance include the bridges over the Chesapeake and Delaware Canal, which are maintained by the U.S. Army Corps of Engineers, and the Delaware Memorial Bridge, which is maintained by the Delaware River and Bay Authority (DRBA). A total of 338.19 miles (544.26 km) of Delaware's roadways are part of the National Highway System, a system of highways important to the United States's economy, defense, and mobility. This system includes all the Interstate Highways in Delaware, other principal arterials which connect to intermodal transportation facilities, and the Strategic Highway Network which provides connections to major military facilities in the United States. The longest route overall in Delaware is US 13 at 103.33 miles (166.29 km), with DE 1 being the longest state route at 103.02 miles (165.79 km). At a length of 23.43 miles (37.71 km), I-95 is the longest of Delaware's three Interstate Highways. The shortest route is DE 491 at 0.36 miles (0.58 km).

The roads maintained by DelDOT include Interstate Highways, other freeways, arterial roads, collector roads, and local roads serving both urban and rural areas. Delaware has a total of 40.61 miles (65.36 km) of freeway considered part of the Interstate Highway System. Non-Interstate freeways in the state include the portion of DE 1 between Dover Air Force Base and Christiana, the section of DE 141 between south of Newport and Prices Corner, and the Puncheon Run Connector that links US 13 and DE 1 in Dover. Three toll roads exist in the state. A mainline toll plaza is located along the Delaware Turnpike portion of I-95 near the Maryland border in Newark. Tolls are also collected along the DE 1 freeway, with mainline toll plazas at Dover and Biddles Corner and ramp tolls at North Dover, South Smyrna, and Boyds Corner. Tolls along I-95 and DE 1 may be paid with cash or an electronic toll collection system known as E-ZPass. The US 301 toll road runs from the Maryland border near Middletown northeast to DE 1 in St. Georges. US 301 uses all-electronic tolling, where tolls are paid with E-ZPass or toll-by-plate, which uses automatic license plate recognition to take a photo of the vehicle's license plate and mail a bill to the vehicle owner. The road has a mainline toll gantry north of the Maryland border and ramp toll gantries on the southbound exits and northbound entrances at the DE 299, DE 71, and Jamison Corner Road interchanges. The DRBA also collects tolls for the Delaware Memorial Bridge for motorists entering Delaware from New Jersey using cash or E-ZPass. Highways and other transportation projects in Delaware are funded through both the Transportation Trust Fund and the Federal Highway Trust Fund. The Transportation Trust Fund receives revenue from tolls along I-95 and DE 1, motor fuel taxes of 23 cents per gallon on gasoline and 22 cents per gallon on special fuels, motor vehicle document and registration fees, and DMV fees. In 2013, revenues from the Transportation Trust Fund were $445.4 million while revenue from the Federal Highway Trust Fund totaled $214.5 million.

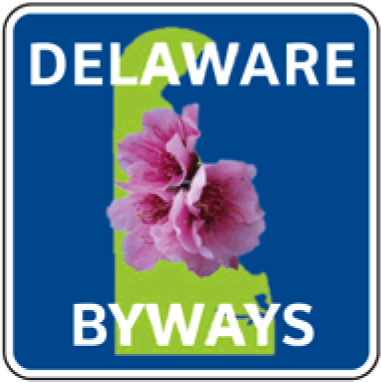
Delaware Byways marker

The Delaware Byways system designates state roads that have scenic, historic, natural, cultural, recreational, or archaeological qualities. The system was created in 2000 and was originally known as the Delaware Scenic and Historic Highways Program. Six byways make up the system, including one National Scenic Byway.

== History ==
=== Early roads ===
The Native Americans who originally inhabited Delaware used waterways to travel, with land trails connecting different bodies of water. Between the arrival of the Swedish colonists to Delaware and the 20th century, roads in Delaware were maintained by individual counties. The early roads that existed following Swedish settlement were short and discontinuous and followed Native American trails and animal paths. During colonial times, most roads in the state remained unimproved. With the arrival of English settlers to Delaware, the King of England called for the construction of "King's Highways" to provide for right-of-way and communication between people in the colony. These roads were simply a narrow clearing through brushes that was not paved. Several roads bearing the King's Highway name connected Philadelphia to Dover and points south. Most of the colonial roads im Delaware ran east–west, connecting coastal ports to inland areas. In the 18th century, the King's Highway ran between Lewes and Wilmington via Dover. By the later part of that century, a post road ran from Horn Town, Virginia north across the Delmarva Peninsula towards Philadelphia. In Delaware, this road passed through Selbyville, Georgetown, Milford, Dover, and Wilmington. During the course of the 18th century, the road network in Delaware became more developed and provided links to waterways, which were still the primary mode of transportation at the time.

In the 19th century, private turnpike companies constructed and improved a few of the more important roadways in the state. Turnpikes were chartered by the state and privately financed, with tolls collected at toll houses every few miles along the road. The first turnpike in Delaware was the Newport Gap Pike, which was built in 1808 and completed to Wilmington in 1811. Many other turnpikes were constructed in northern New Castle County radiating from Wilmington and connected the industrial city to agricultural areas. The turnpikes were built as straight roads in order to reduce costs. Many of these roads were constructed with a macadam surface. During the course of the 19th century, new methods of transportation such as canals and railroads came about and there was less investment on roads. The revenues of the turnpike companies fell and roads became more of a local concern.

=== Development of state highways ===
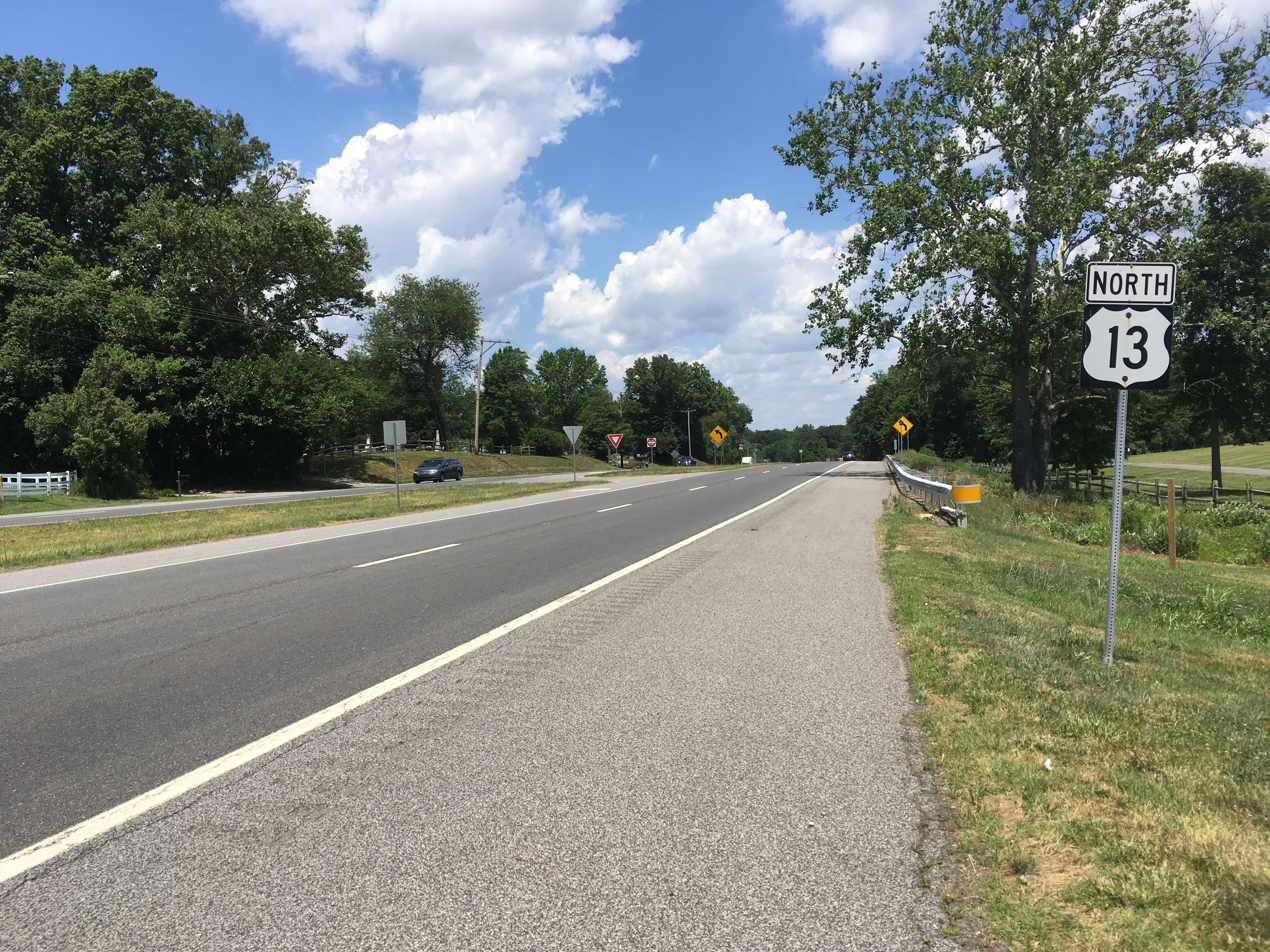
Northbound US 13 on the divided Dupont Parkway north of Odessa

At the turn of the 20th century, the automobile was introduced and a push came for better roads to be constructed. In 1903, the state attempted to create a state highway system by passing a state aid law where both the state and county would finance improvements to roads. However, this law was repealed in 1905 due to public outcry. In 1908, Thomas Coleman DuPont proposed a modern road that was to run the length of the state from Selbyville north to Wilmington as part of a philanthropic measure. This roadway was planned to improve travel and bring economic development to Kent and Sussex counties. The DuPont Highway was to be modeled after the great boulevards of Europe and was to have a 200-foot (61 m) wide right-of-way consisting of a 40-foot (12 m) wide roadway for automobiles flanked by dual trolley lines, 30-foot (9.1 m) wide roadways for heavy vehicles, 15-foot (4.6 m) wide unpaved roadways for horses, and sidewalks. Utilities were to be buried underground below the horse roadways. The highway was also to include agricultural experimental stations and monuments for future surveying. Trolley revenues would help pay for the construction of the roadway. After portions of the DuPont Highway were built, these portions were planned to be turned over to the state at no charge. The Coleman DuPont Road, Inc. was established in 1911 and construction of the DuPont Highway began. The DuPont Highway would end up being built as a two-lane concrete road on a 60-foot (18 m) alignment with a 32-foot (9.8 m) wide roadway.

The Delaware State Highway Department (DSHD) was created on April 2, 1917 to construct and maintain a system of state highways across Delaware. As a result, the state took over construction of the DuPont Highway. The DuPont Highway was completed in 1923 when the final section near Odessa was finished. The DuPont Highway was a boon to southern Delaware, which had formerly been economically isolated from the large cities of the northeast. In conjunction with the rise of the automobile, the highway spurred the growth of the Delaware Beaches by greatly improving access to the coast for tourists from northern Delaware and adjacent portions of the Northeast megalopolis. Southern Delaware also developed into a major truck farming region due to having much greater access to urban markets. No longer fully reliant on the railroads to transport their goods, farmers in Sussex and Kent counties could market their fruits, vegetables, and broiler chickens directly to consumers in the north. Also during this time, the State Aid Road Law ushered in a period of highway improvement in which the county would offer road bonds and the state would match. The DSHD would then improve the highway. Most of the highways improved by the DSHD were built as concrete roads, with sharp curves eliminated. The state also took over the last of the private turnpikes and converted them to free roads. In 1926, the state began eliminating several railroad grade crossings and in 1927 the first all-weather secondary roads were constructed, consisting of one concrete lane and one dirt lane in an effort to reduce costs.

Evolution of Delaware state route marker

1936

1955

1964

1971

The first numbered routes in Delaware were announced in 1925 with the creation of the U.S. Highway System, in which US 13, US 40, and US 113 were planned to run through the state. These three U.S. Highways, along with US 122, were designated through Delaware on November 11, 1926. In 1930 and again in 1932, the DSHD recommended giving numbers to state roads to supplement the existing U.S. Highway System. By 1936, Delaware began assigning numbers to state routes. The original state route marker was a square with "DEL" on top and the route number on bottom in a block font. By 1955, the shield was modified to a square with "DELAWARE" on top and the route number on bottom in FHWA Series font. In 1964, the route marker became a cutout circle with "DEL" on top and the route number on bottom. The current route marker was introduced in 1971.

In 1934, the entire length of US 13 between Dover and Wilmington was widened into a divided highway, which at the time was the best superhighway and the longest stretch of divided highway in the world. During the course of the 1930s, several other state roads were constructed while others were widened into divided highways. In 1935, the DSHD took over maintenance of all remaining county roads, tripling the mileage of the state highway system, and took over several city streets in Wilmington in 1936. Progress on improving the state highway system slowed during World War II; the only major project completed during that time was the construction of the high-level St. Georges Bridge to replace a lift bridge destroyed by a ship in 1939. Following the war, several highway improvement projects took place including widening more roads to divided highways. On August 16, 1951, the Delaware Memorial Bridge and its approach road opened to traffic, providing a fixed road link for US 40 across the Delaware River to New Jersey and replacing ferry service that previously existed. Following the completion of the bridge, traffic along US 13 and US 40 increased, with plans made for a new freeway to handle the increased traffic. In 1957, US 13 was widened into a divided highway between Greenwood and Harrington, providing a divided highway running the north–south length of the state.

=== Freeways ===
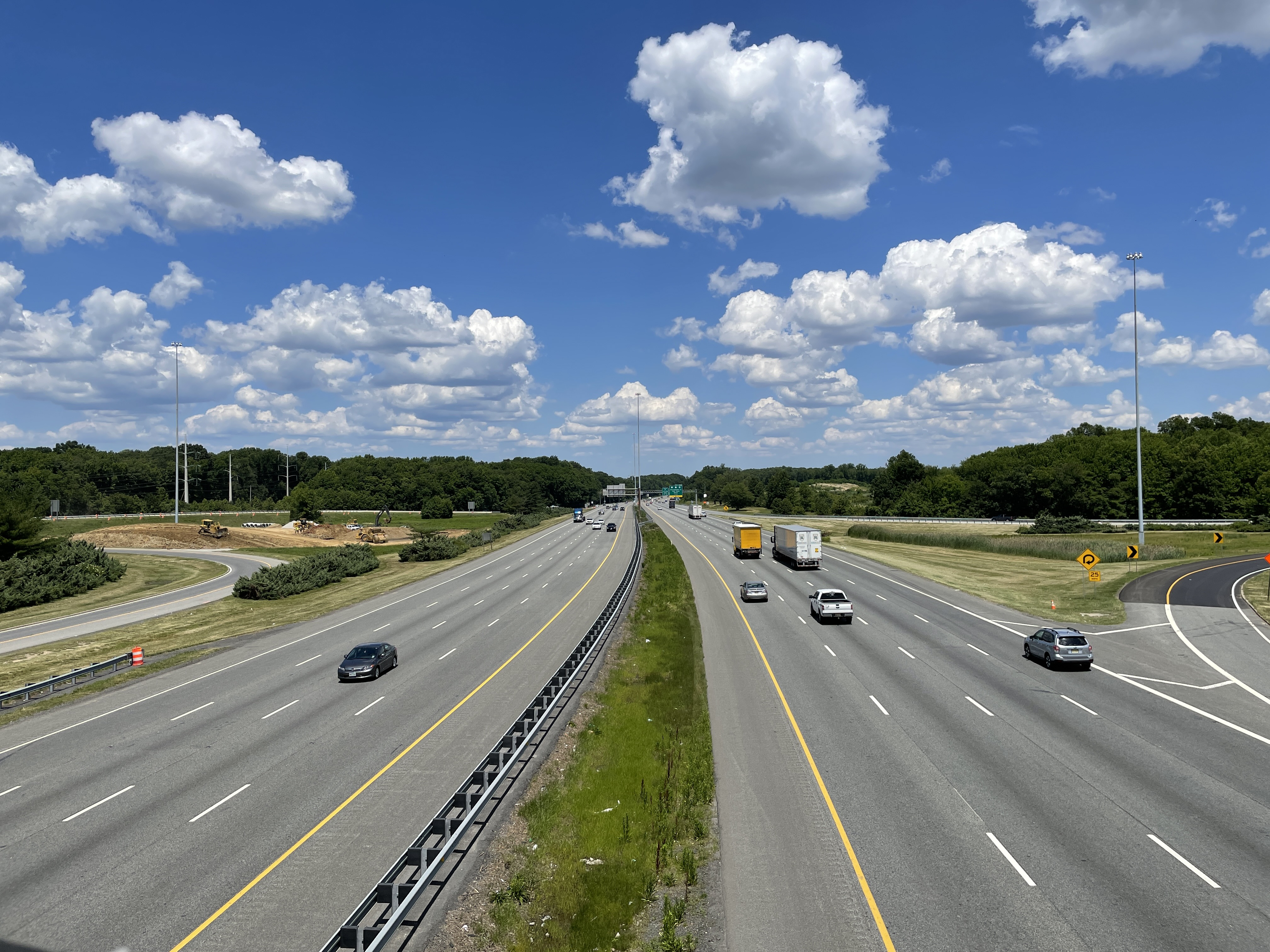
I-95 northbound at the DE 273 interchange in Christiana

In 1956, the Interstate Highway System was created, with under 40 miles (64 km) of Interstate Highway planned in New Castle County. The first Interstate came in 1959 when the Delaware Memorial Bridge approach was upgraded to Interstate Highway standards and became part of I-295. The portion of I-95 between the Maryland border near Newark and Newport and I-295 between Newport and the approach to the Delaware Memorial Bridge in Farnhurst was to be built as a free Interstate Highway using federal funds, but was built as the tolled Delaware Turnpike instead in order to speed up construction. On November 15, 1963, the turnpike opened to traffic. The Delaware Turnpike allowed motorists to travel from Washington, D.C. to Boston without having to stop at a traffic light. In 1968, I-95 was completed between the Delaware Turnpike and the Pennsylvania border. The I-495 bypass to the east of Wilmington fully opened in 1977.

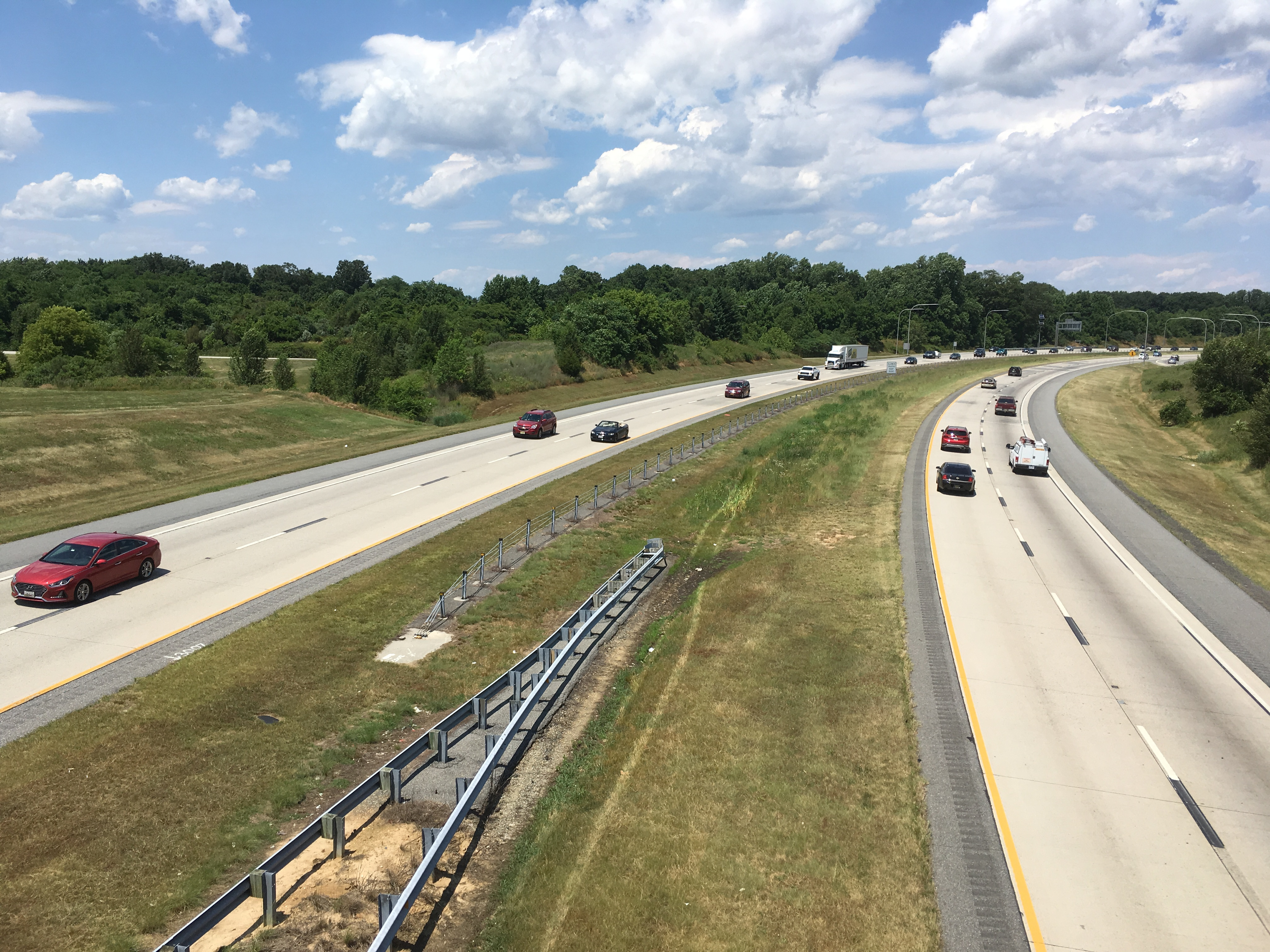
DE 1 toll road near Odessa

In the 1980s, plans were made for a limited-access Relief Route of US 13 between Dover and the Wilmington area that would alleviate it of traffic heading to the Delaware Beaches in the summer. This Relief Route would become designated as part of DE 1, a route that ran along the Atlantic Ocean in Sussex County and north to Milford. The DE 1 toll road between Dover Air Force Base and Christiana opened in stages between 1991 and 2003. The total cost to build the DE 1 toll road was $900 million and it was the largest public works project in Delaware history.

Since the 1950s, a freeway has been planned along the US 301 corridor between I-95 and the Maryland border southwest of Middletown in order to provide a connection from the Delaware Memorial Bridge towards the Chesapeake Bay Bridge and the Washington, D.C. area. The most recent proposal called for US 301 to be built as a limited-access toll road from the Maryland border southwest of Middletown northeast to DE 1 in St. Georges. Construction began in 2016 and the highway opened to traffic in 2019.

=== 21st century ===
DelDOT began a program to pave the last of the state-maintained dirt roads within Delaware in the mid 1990s, which at the time totaled 100 miles (160 km). The last dirt road in the state to be paved was Spicer Road (Road 240) near Ellendale in Sussex County in 2002. Since 2000, DelDOT has eliminated several concurrencies in the state in order to reduce motorist confusion. Among the changes made included truncating US 113 from Dover to Milford to eliminate an overlap with DE 1, removing DE 20 from heading into Fenwick Island along DE 54, shortening the length of DE 2 through Newark to avoid several concurrencies, and removing DE 41 from a concurrency with DE 2 in Prices Corner.

== Work cited ==
- John Milner Associates (July 2005). Historic Context for the DuPont Highway U.S. Route 113: Kent and Sussex County, Delaware (PDF). In association with Whitman Requardt and Rummel, Klepper & Kahl. Dover, DE: Delaware Department of Transportation.
