= Greenbank Historic Area =

- U.S. National Register of Historic Places
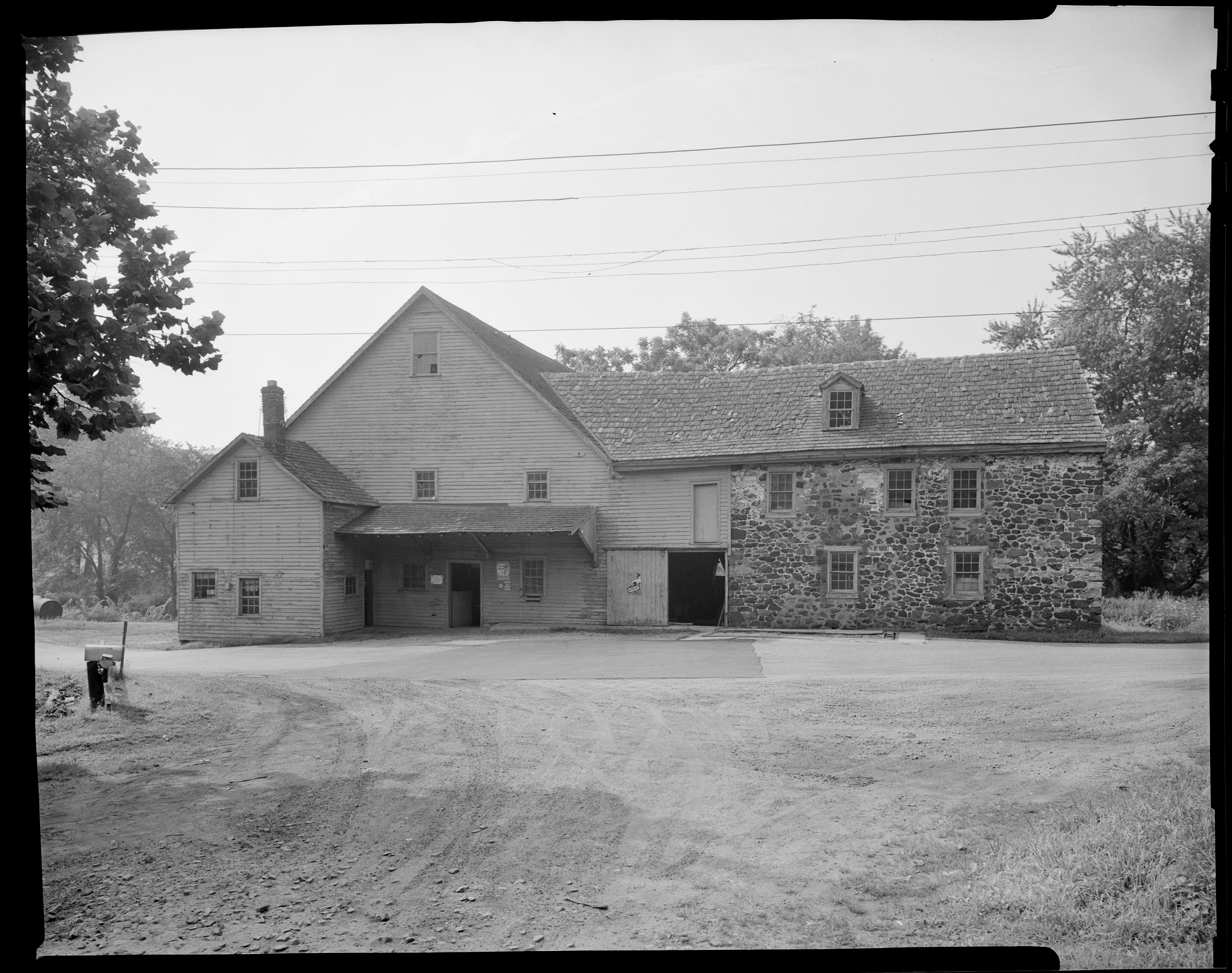
- HABS photo of Greenbank Mill

- Location within Delaware Location within the United States
- Location: 500 Greenbank Mill Rd., Marshallton, Delaware
- Coordinates: 39°44′24″N 75°37′59″W
- Area: 5 acres (2.0 ha)
- Built: 1795
- NRHP reference No.: 73000513, 79003441 (Boundary Increase)
- Added to NRHP: July 2, 1973, July 24, 1979 (Boundary Increase)

Greenbank Historic Area is a historic grist mill located at Marshallton, Delaware, United States. The property includes the Greenbank Mill, Robert Philips House, and the W. G. Philips House. The mill was built in 1790 and expanded in 1812. It is a 2 1/2 story, frame structure with a stone wing. The mill measures 50 feet (15 m) by 39 feet (12 m). The Robert Philips House was built in 1783, and is a 2 1/2 story, five-bay, stone dwelling with a gable roof. The front facade features a long verandah. The W. G. Philips House, also known as the mill owner's house, dates to the mid-19th century. It consists of a two-story, three-bay front section with a three-story, hipped roof rear section. Oliver Evans, a native of nearby Newport, installed his automatic mill machinery in the 1790 building.

It was listed on the National Register of Historic Places in 1973 and expanded in 1979 to include the W. G. Philips House.

The site is now operated as Greenbank Mill, a living history museum that includes the restored mill, an early 19th-century farm barn housing heritage sheep, the miller's house (Philips House), the textile factory and an herb garden.
