= Delaware Department of Transportation =

Government agency in the U.S. state of Delaware

Delaware Department of Transportation (DelDOT)

Agency overview
- Formed: 1917
- Preceding agency: Delaware State Highway Department
- Jurisdiction: Delaware
- Headquarters: 800 South Bay Road, Dover, Delaware
- Agency executive: Shanté Hastings, Secretary of Transportation
- Parent agency: State of Delaware
- Website: deldot.gov

The Delaware Department of Transportation (DelDOT) is an agency of the U.S. state of Delaware. The Secretary of Transportation is Shanté Hastings. The agency was established in 1917 and has its headquarters in Dover.

The department's responsibilities include maintaining 89 percent of the state's public roadways (the Delaware State Route System) totaling 13,507 lane miles, snow removal, overseeing the "Adopt-A-Highway" program, overseeing E-ZPass Delaware, the Division of Motor Vehicles (DMV), and the Delaware Transit Corporation (known as DART First State).

DelDOT maintains a 24/7 Traffic Management Center in Smyrna at the State Emergency Operations Center. At that location, they monitor traffic conditions, operate traffic lights, and broadcast on 1380 AM via WTMC radio.

Since 1969, the agency has also maintained a transportation library on Bay Road in Dover.

On February 18, 2011, Sec. Carolann Wicks, who had been Secretary of Transportation since 2006, resigned. On March 21, 2011, Cleon Cauley, who had been appointed Deputy Secretary two months earlier, was appointed Acting Secretary. On July 5, 2011, Shailen Bhatt was sworn in as the new Secretary of Transportation. On February 3, 2015 Jennifer Cohan was sworn in as the tenth Secretary of Transportation by Governor Jack Markell. Secretary Cohan replaces Shailen Bhatt who stepped down to become the Executive Director for the Colorado Department of Transportation.

On April 7, 2018, DelDOT along with DNREC started a month long hackathon to make Delaware "the most accessible state" by finding ways to improve transportation access to recreational areas in the state.

== Department organization ==
The Office of the Secretary represents the Governor of Delaware in issues that involve DelDOT and also provides leadership to the department supporting the statewide Long-Range Transportation Plan. The office also enhances relationships between DelDOT and other state agencies, the Delaware General Assembly, local governments, and civic associations. The Office of the Secretary helps protect public assets of the department and develops and maintains a Continuity of Operations Plan to keep the department running during major disruptions.

The Delaware Transit Corporation, operating as DART First State, is a division of DelDOT that provides public transportation services in the state of Delaware. DART First State provides local and inter-county bus service throughout the state and also subsidizes commuter rail service along SEPTA Regional Rail's Wilmington/Newark Line serving the northern part of the state. The agency also operates statewide paratransit service for people with disabilities. The DART First State public transit system was named "Most Outstanding Public Transportation System" in 2003 by the American Public Transportation Association.

The Finance division of DelDOT collects revenues and pays vendors and is in charge of the department's financial records. It is in charge of the operating and capital budgets, including transportation appropriations and grants from the federal government.

The Human Resources division recruits and hires employees for DelDOT and helps develop and retrain them in their careers with the department. Human Resources also ensures equality and fairness in the DelDOT workforce.

The Maintenance & Operations division is in charge of maintaining the roadways in the state that comprise the Delaware State Route System. The division is tasked with snow removal and responding to other weather conditions that affect the roads. Maintenance & Operations is also in charge of the Community Transportation Fund and maintaining the equipment fleet.

The Division of Motor Vehicles (DMV) is in charge of issuing drivers licenses, vehicle registrations, and vehicle inspection. DMV locations offering these services are located in Wilmington, Delaware City, Dover, and Georgetown. The division is also in charge of collecting motor fuel taxes and tolls along the state's three toll roads that help provide transportation funding to the state.

The Planning division of DelDOT is in charge of transportation planning and permitting to address the state's transportation needs. The division provides transportation information to local governments to help with land use decisions.

The Community Relations division is in charge of public outreach activities to reach out to residents about issues pertaining to transportation. The division oversees safety campaigns, Customer Relations activities, and providing information about choices within the state's transportation system.

The Technology and Innonvation Services division delivers transportation services in collaboration with other divisions of DelDOT. The division oversees the technology needed to run DelDOT and is in charge of the department's telecommunications network.

The Transportation Solutions division of DelDOT develops, constructs, and maintains the department's infrastructure. The division is in charge of construction projects and makes sure projects are completed according to the state's Capital Transportation program. It also oversees video cameras and signal system coordination technology that improves the efficiency of the state's transportation infrastructure. Transportation Solutions also manages the rehabilitation and replacement of structurally deficient bridges along with managing the rehabilitation of pavement along state-maintained roads. The division also maintains road signs, traffic signals, and pavement markings along state-maintained roads.

== See also ==
- Vehicle registration plates of Delaware
