= Prices Corner, Delaware =

Unincorporated community in Delaware, United States

- Unincorporated community
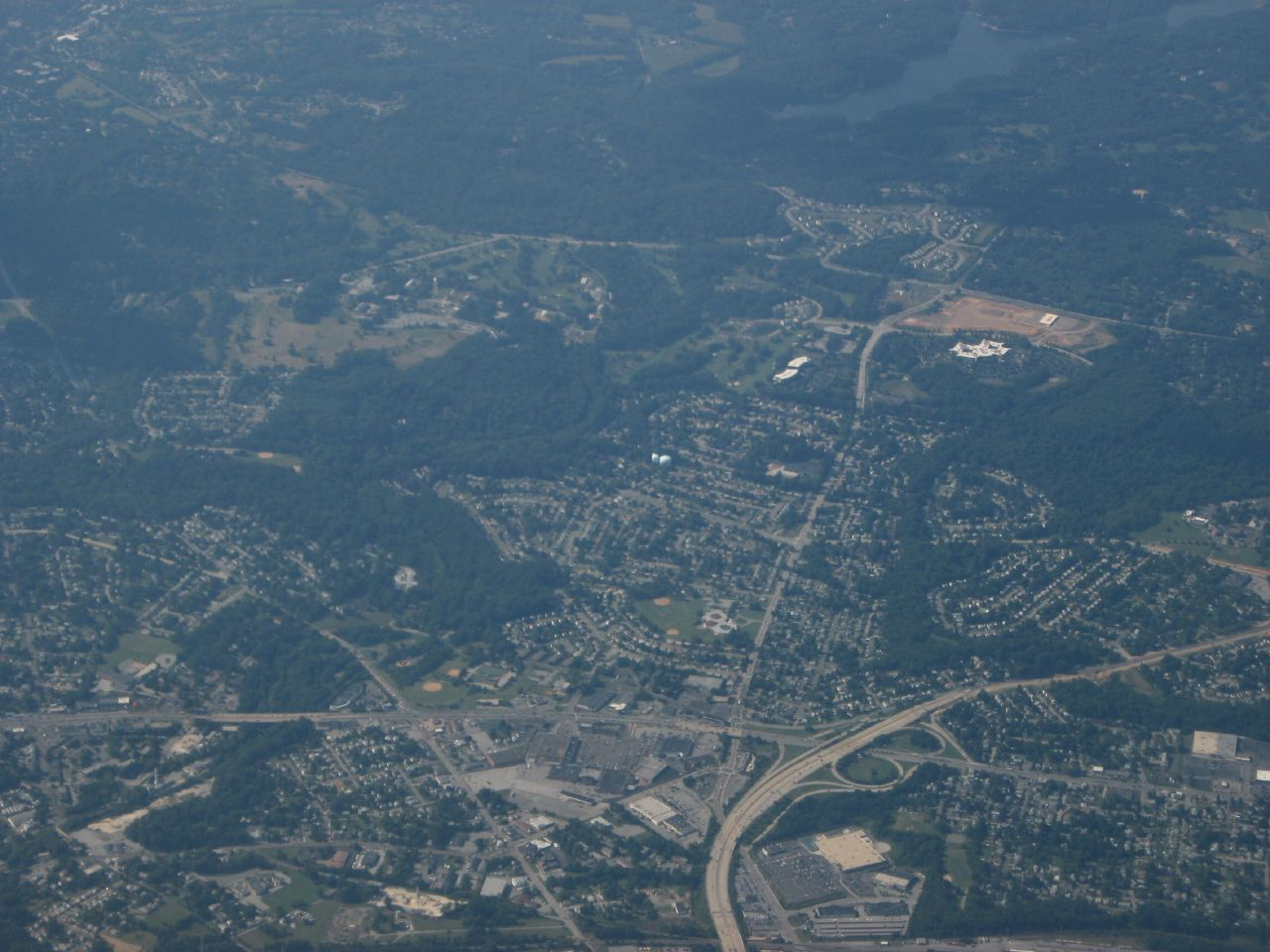
- Aerial view of Prices Corner

- Location within Delaware Location within the United States
- Coordinates: 39°44′13″N 75°37′20″W
- Country: United States
- State: Delaware
- County: New Castle
- Elevation: 115 ft (35 m)
- Time zone: UTC-5 (Eastern (EST))
  - Summer (DST): UTC-4 (EDT)
- Area code: 302
- GNIS feature ID: 214491

Prices Corner is an unincorporated community in New Castle County, Delaware, United States. Prices Corner is located at the intersection of Delaware Route 2 and Delaware Route 141, west of Wilmington. The Prices Corner Shopping Center is located in Prices Corner.
