= U.S. Route 40 in Delaware =

Road section in Delaware, United States

U.S. Route 40
- US 40 highlighted in red

Route information
- Maintained by DelDOT and DRBA
- Length: 17.18 mi (27.65 km)
- Existed: 1926–present

Major junctions
- West end: US 40 at Maryland border in Glasgow
- DE 896 in Glasgow; DE 72 near Glasgow; DE 7 in Bear; DE 1 in Bear; US 13 in State Road; DE 273 in Hares Corner; US 202 / DE 141 in Wilmington Manor; I-295 / US 13 in Wilmington Manor; DE 9 in Holloway Terrace
- East end: I-295 / N.J. Turnpike / US 40 at New Jersey border in Holloway Terrace

Location
- Country: United States
- State: Delaware
- Counties: New Castle

Highway system
- United States Numbered Highway System; List; Special; Divided; Delaware State Route System; List; Byways
← DE 37	→ DE 41

U.S. Route 40 (US 40) is a US highway running from Silver Summit, Utah, east to Atlantic City, New Jersey. In the US state of Delaware, it serves as a major east–west highway in northern New Castle County, just south of Wilmington. It runs from the Maryland state line west of Glasgow east to the Delaware Memorial Bridge over the Delaware River to New Jersey, at which point it is concurrent with Interstate 295 (I-295). Along the way, US 40 passes through suburban areas in Glasgow and Bear before running concurrent with US 13 and I-295 around New Castle. US 40 is a multilane divided highway the entire length across Delaware, with the section concurrent with I-295 a freeway.

US 40 was originally built as a state highway during the 1920s, comprising Elkton Road and a part of the Dupont Highway. When first designated, the route followed these two roads from the Maryland state line to Wilmington, where it crossed the Delaware River on a ferry to Penns Grove, New Jersey. In 1928, the route was rerouted at Hares Corner to head east into New Castle and cross the river on a ferry to Pennsville, New Jersey. The entire length of US 40 west of Hares Corner was widened to a divided highway during the 1930s. The Delaware Memorial Bridge opened in 1951, and US 40 was rerouted north along US 13 before heading east along the bridge approach, with Delaware Route 273 (DE 273) extended east along the former route into New Castle. In 1959, the Delaware Memorial Bridge approach became a part of I-295. Between the 1960s and 1990s, US 301 ran along the US 13/US 40 concurrency and US 301N followed US 40 between Glasgow and State Road from the 1970s to the 1980s.

== Route description ==
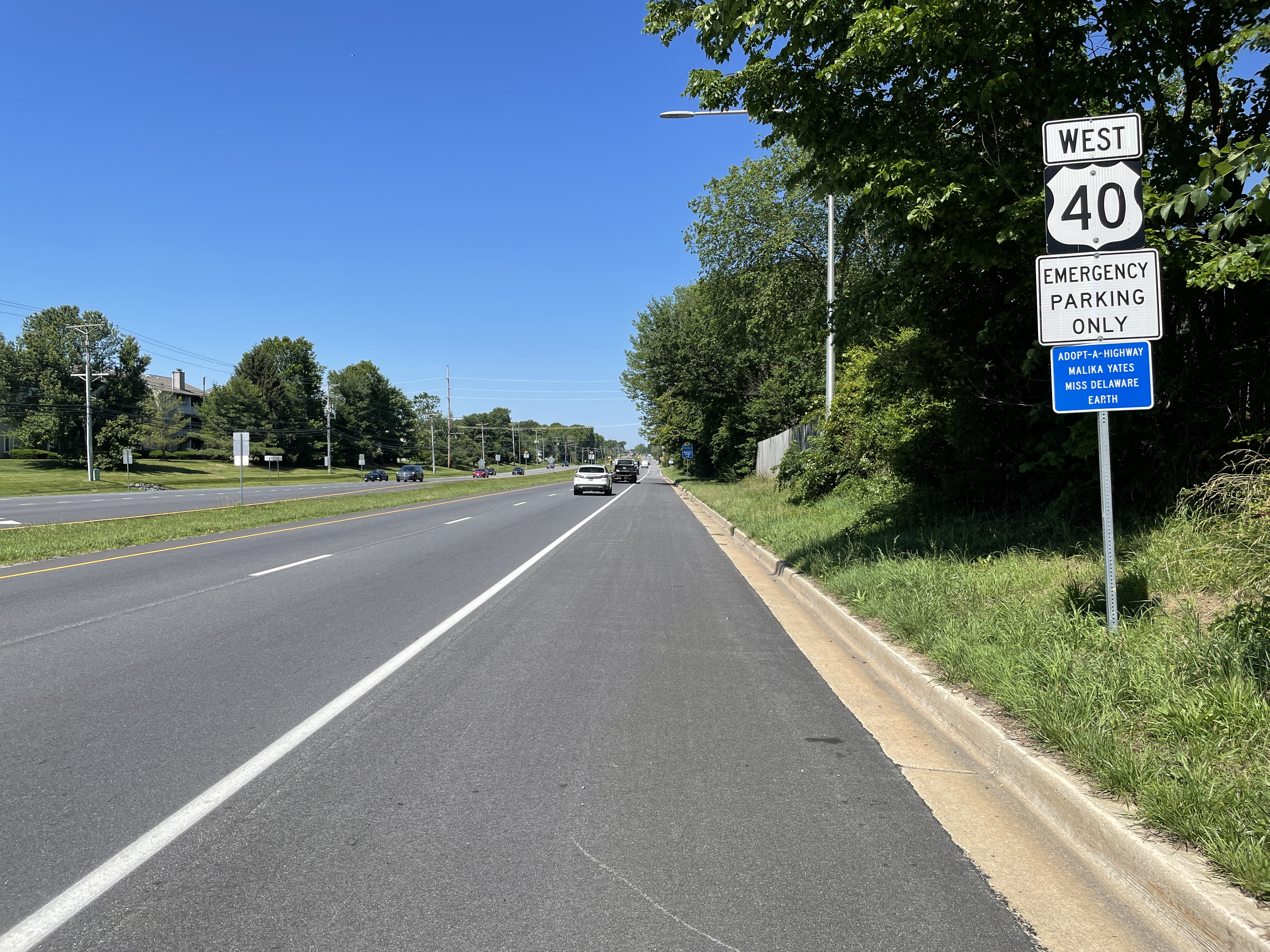
US 40 westbound past DE 72 near Glasgow

US 40 enters Delaware from Maryland west of Glasgow, heading east on four-lane divided Pulaski Highway (which originates in Baltimore). From the state line, the route passes near residential subdivisions. Upon reaching Glasgow, the road continues into commercial areas and the median of the road widens to include businesses in it. US 40 passes north of the Peoples Plaza shopping center and comes to an intersection with DE 896 Bus. in the center of the community. The median of the road narrows as it reaches a junction with DE 896 on the eastern edge of Glasgow. Past this junction, the route runs between Glasgow Park to the north and a mix of development and woods to the south, crossing Belltown Run. US 40 passes through residential and business areas and comes to an intersection with DE 72. Past this intersection, the road curves to the northeast, crossing Norfolk Southern's Delmarva Secondary railroad line at-grade. The route heads through a mix of wooded areas and businesses as it enters Bear, intersecting Salem Church Road/Porter Road. US 40 continues through suburban development with some farm fields, passing to the south of the Wilmington University Athletic Complex. The road widens to six lanes at the Walther Road/Glendale Boulevard junction before reaching an intersection with DE 7 in a business area.

Past this intersection, US 40 comes to a partial cloverleaf interchange with the DE 1 freeway. After this interchange, the route narrows to four lanes and passes more development and some farm fields, reaching a westbound right-in/right-out with Appleby Road. Farther east, US 40 heads through business areas immediately to the north of Norfolk Southern's New Castle Secondary railroad line as it reaches a directional intersection with US 13 in State Road; this intersection has no access from northbound US 13 to westbound US 40.

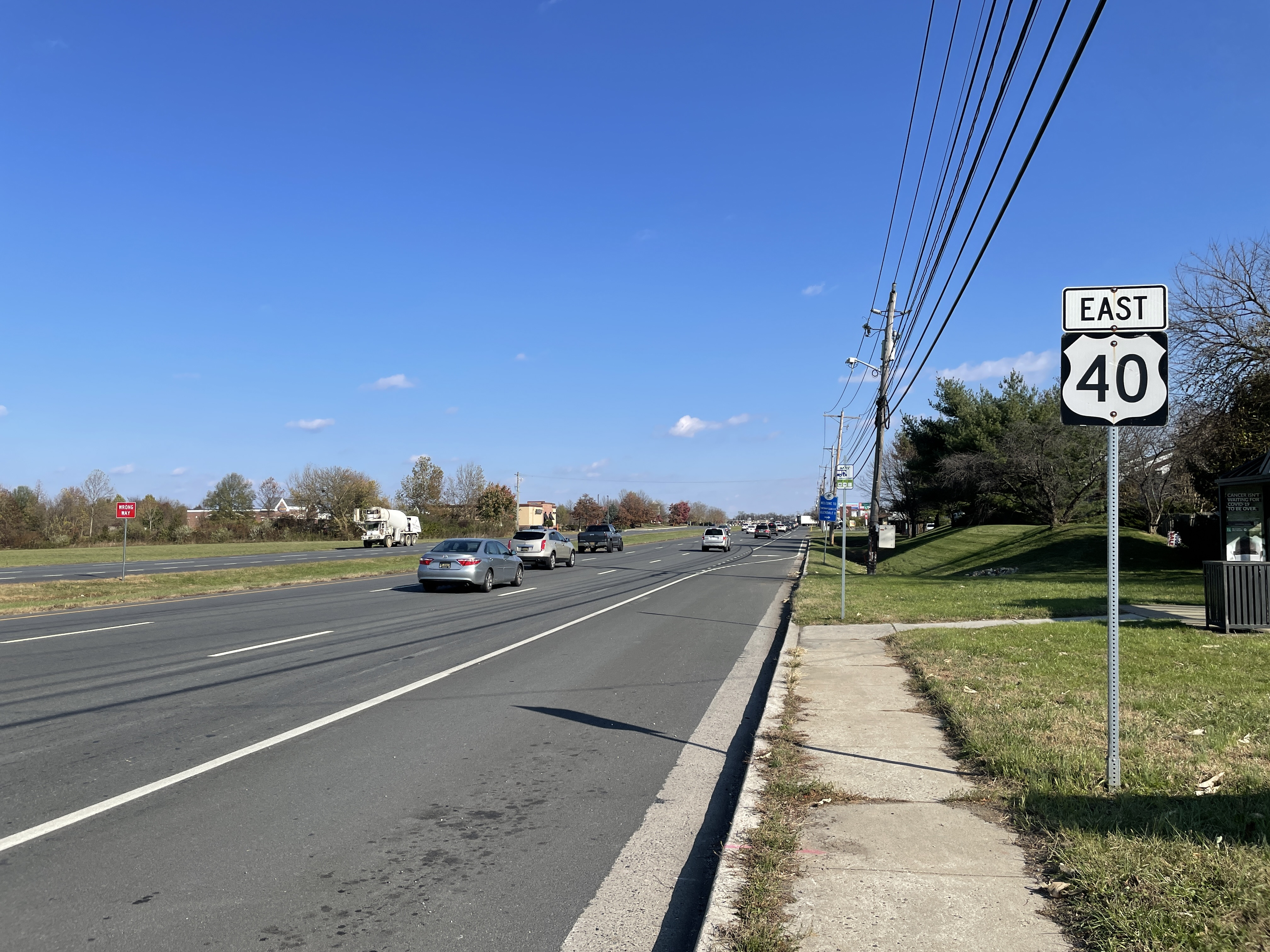
US 40 eastbound past Walther Road/Glendale Boulevard in Bear

At this point, US 40 heads northeast for a concurrency with US 13 on South Dupont Highway, an eight-lane divided highway. DE 9 Truck also runs concurrent with US 13/US 40 at this point. The road runs through commercial areas, coming to an intersection with DE 273 in Hares Corner. At this point, DE 9 Truck splits from US 13/US 40 by heading east along DE 273. Past this intersection, US 13/US 40 becomes North Dupont Highway and passes between Wilmington Airport to the northwest and businesses to the southeast as it runs along the western border of the city of New Castle for a short distance, reaching a partial cloverleaf interchange with the southern terminus of US 202 and DE 141 at the end of the airport property. Following this, the two routes narrow to six lanes, heading to the northwest of the Main Campus of Wilmington University and running through more commercial areas in Wilmington Manor. Along this stretch, the route gains an eastbound combined right turn, bus, and bicycle lane. The road loses the eastbound combined right turn, bus, and bicycle lane before passing over the Jack A. Markell Trail and reaching an interchange with I-295 in Farnhurst.

Here, US 40 splits from US 13 by heading east concurrent with I-295 on an eight-lane freeway maintained by the Delaware River and Bay Authority (DRBA). The road has an eastbound ramp to Landers Lane before it passes between residential neighborhoods and comes to a cloverleaf interchange with DE 9 north of New Castle. This interchange provides access to Veterans Memorial Park, where a war memorial honoring veterans from Delaware and New Jersey is located. Past DE 9, the median of the freeway widens to include the DRBA headquarters, with direct access to and from the westbound lanes while eastbound access is provided by way of DE 9. After this, the westbound direction has a toll plaza for the Delaware Memorial Bridge. I-295/US 40 continues east and passes over Norfolk Southern's New Castle Secondary before crossing the Delaware River on the twin-span Delaware Memorial Bridge, at which point both routes head into New Jersey.

US 40 in Delaware has an annual average daily traffic count ranging from a high of 107,176 vehicles at the DE 9 interchange along the I-295 concurrency to a low of 25,863 vehicles at the Appleby Road intersection between Bear and New Castle. The entire length of US 40 in Delaware is part of the National Highway System.

== History ==
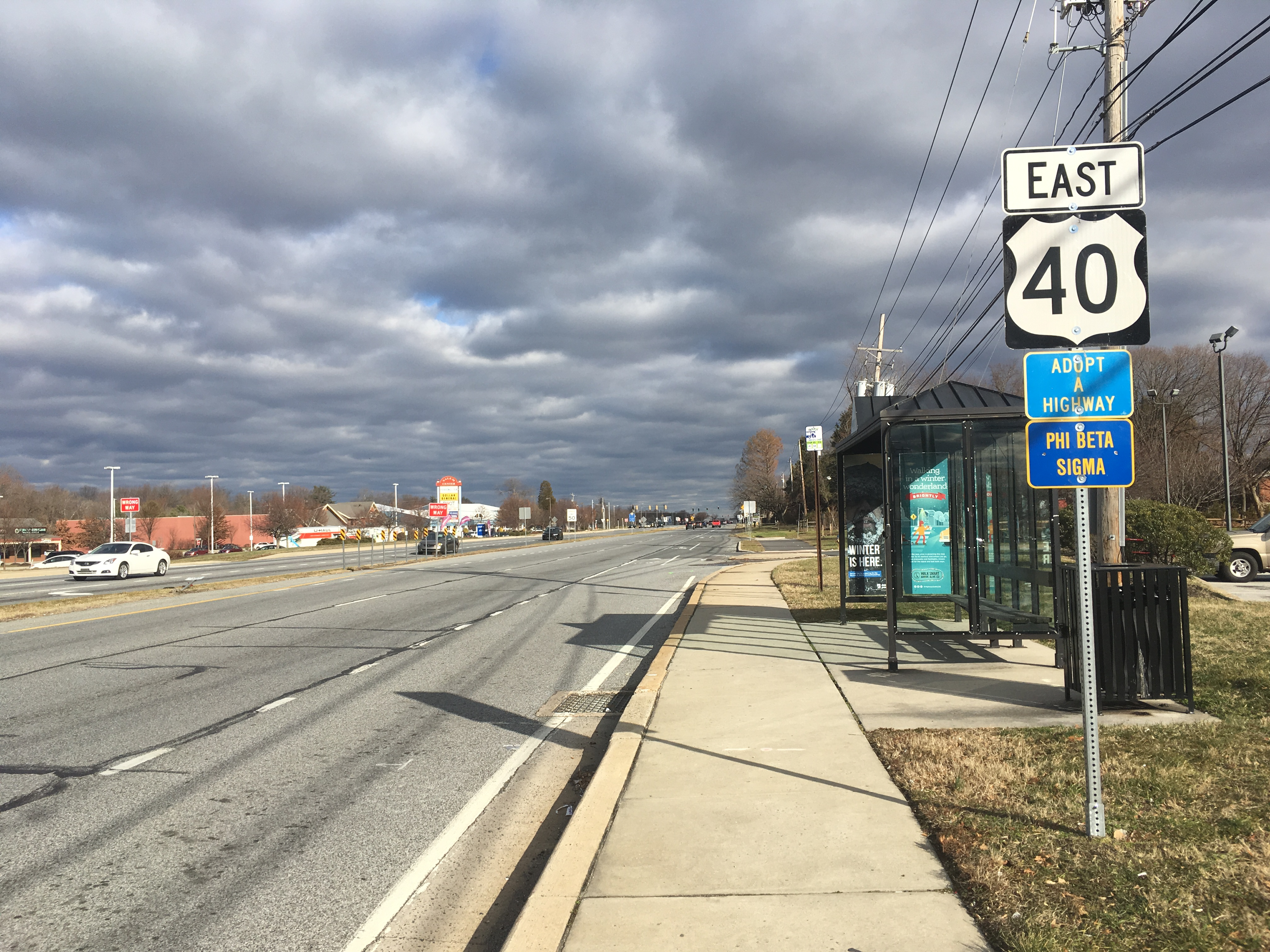
US 40 eastbound past Salem Church Road/Porter Road in Bear

By 1920, what would become the Delaware portion of US 40 was a county road, with the portion along US 13 under contract to become a state highway. The section of US 40 along the Dupont Highway was completed by 1923. The Pulaski Highway portion of the road was built as a state highway by 1924. When the US Highway System was created on November 11, 1926, US 40 was designated to pass through Delaware along Elkton Road (Pulaski Highway) between the Maryland state line and State Road, a concurrency with US 13 from State Road to Wilmington, and Christina Avenue from US 13 to a ferry across the Delaware River which carried the route to Penns Grove, New Jersey. In 1926, the Delaware State Highway Department suggested that the portion of US 40 that followed US 13 along the DuPont Highway be widened. This widening was completed a year later. In 1928, US 40 was rerouted at Hares Corner to head east through New Castle and cross the Delaware River on a ferry to Pennsville, New Jersey. All of the route was a state highway by 1931 except the portion from Hares Corner to the Basin Road intersection in New Castle.

In 1931, work began on widening US 40 along the US 13 concurrency to a divided highway. The completion of the divided highway between State Road and Wilmington was slated for summer 1933. US 202 was designated concurrent with US 13/US 40 north of State Road in 1934. Recommendations were made in 1932 to widen US 40 into a divided highway between the Maryland state line and State Road. A year later, the divided highway portion of US 40 had been graded between the Maryland state line and Glasgow while paving of the divided highway was in progress between Bear and State Road. Grading of the divided highway between the Maryland state line and State Road had been completed in 1934 with construction of the remainder of the road underway. Work on widening US 40 to a divided highway between the Maryland state line and US 13 was finished in 1936. In 1934, recommendations were made to upgrade US 40 to a state highway between Hares Corner and New Castle. The portion of US 40 between Hares Corner and New Castle was taken over by the state on July 1, 1935. Construction on upgrading this section began in 1936, with the project completed later that year. The same year, a bridge was constructed over a Pennsylvania Railroad line (now the Jack A. Markell Trail) in New Castle.

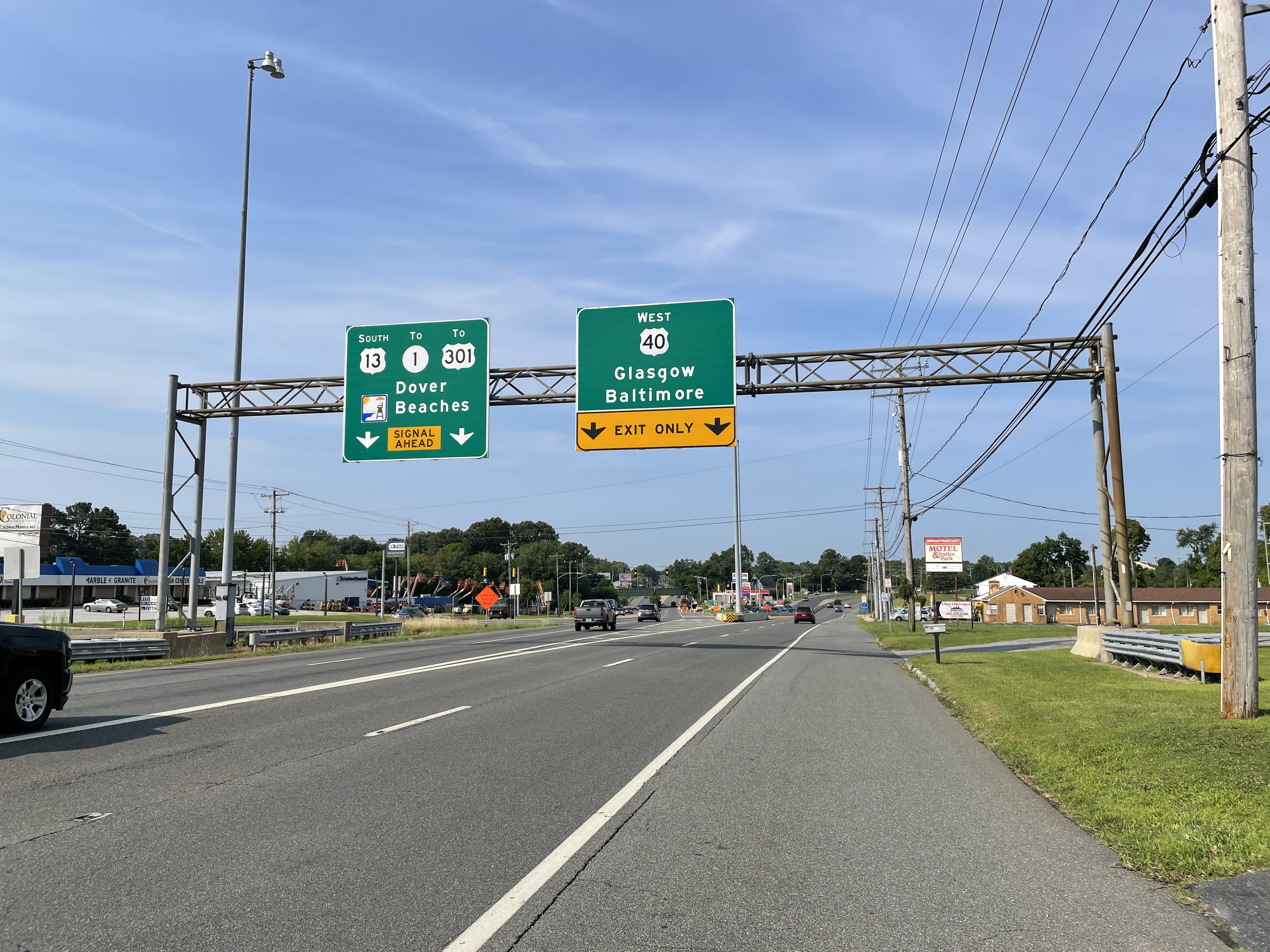
Split between US 13 southbound and US 40 westbound in State Road

Construction on the Delaware Memorial Bridge began in 1949. At the same time, work was underway on the Delaware Memorial Bridge approach, a divided highway which would begin at a directional T interchange with US 13/US 202 in Farnhurst and head east to a cloverleaf interchange at New Castle Avenue (present DE 9) before leading to the bridge. Construction on the US 13/US 202 interchange at Farnhurst began on July 12, 1950. On August 16, 1951, the Delaware Memorial Bridge opened to traffic. US 40 was rerouted to use the Delaware Memorial Bridge to cross the Delaware River, being realigned to follow US 13/US 202 north from Hares Corner to Farnhurst and the bridge approach road between Farnhurst and the bridge. The ferry connecting New Castle to Pennsville was discontinued and DE 273 was extended east along the former alignment of US 40 into New Castle.

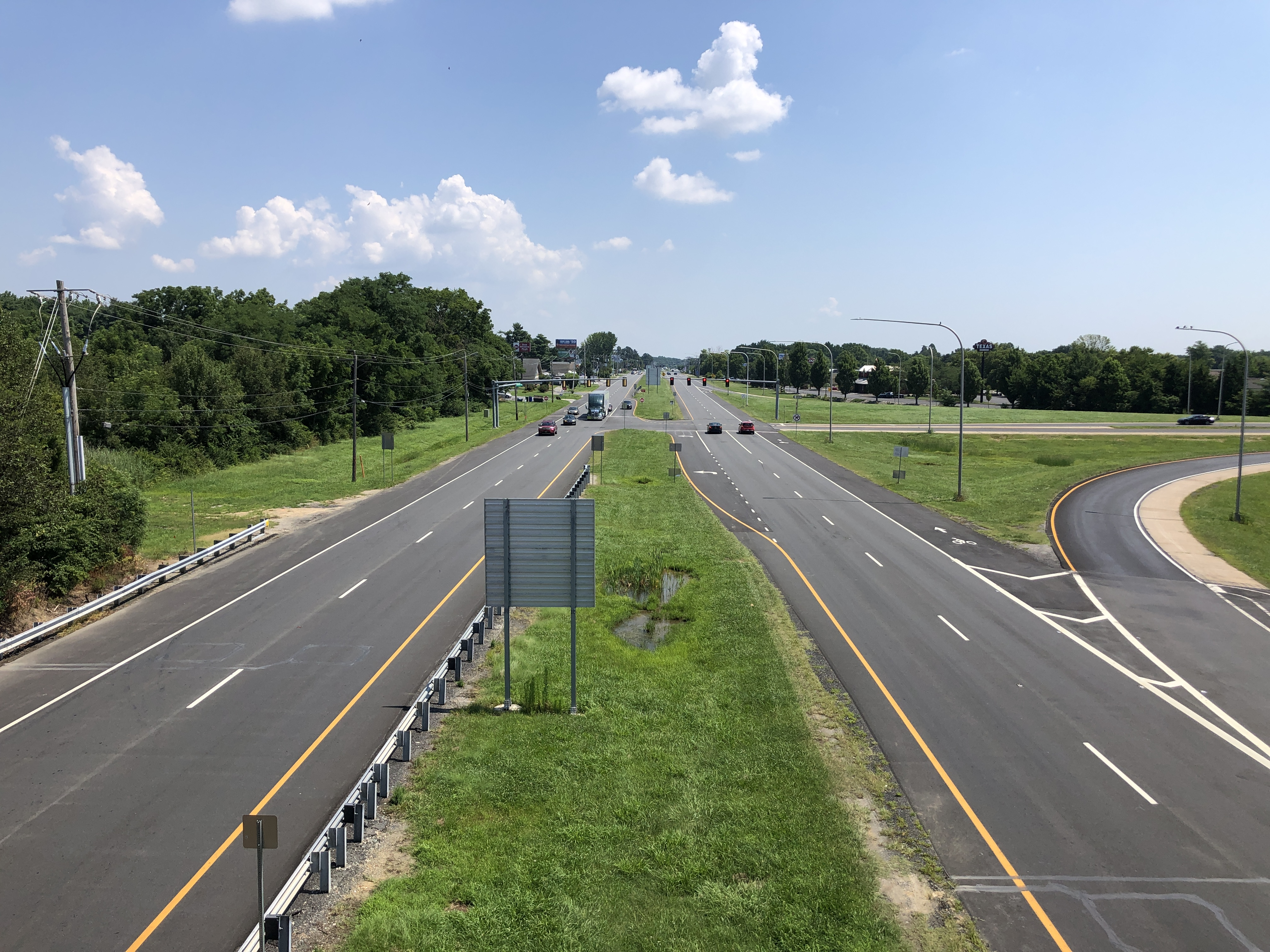
US 40 eastbound at DE 1 near Bear

In 1954, plans were made to replace the intersection with DE 41/DE 141 in Basin Corner with a modified cloverleaf interchange in an effort to reduce traffic congestion. Construction on the interchange began in September of that year. The interchange between US 13/US 40/US 202 and DE 41/DE 141 was completed in 1956. In 1958, construction began for a bridge at the Farnhurst interchange that would link the US 40 approach to the Delaware Memorial Bridge to the Delaware Turnpike that was proposed to run west to the Maryland state line. A year later, the Farnhurst interchange and the bridge approach were upgraded to Interstate Highway standards, and it was designated as part of I-295. Construction at the interchange connecting to the Delaware Turnpike at Farnhurst was completed in July 1961. On November 14, 1963, the Delaware Turnpike opened to traffic, with I-295 extended west (south) to I-95 at the northern terminus of the turnpike. In the middle of 1964, work began on a second span at the Delaware Memorial Bridge due to increasing traffic volumes. The second span of the bridge was opened to traffic in the later part of 1968.

The US 202 designation was removed from US 13/US 40 between State Road and Farnhurst in 1964, with US 301 extended north to follow US 13/US 40 from State Road to Farnhurst. US 301N was designated to follow US 40 between DE 896 and US 13 in 1971. US 301N was removed from US 40 in 1985. By 1994, US 301 was removed from the US 13/US 40 concurrency, having been rerouted to follow DE 896 to end at US 40 in Glasgow. Despite this, the American Association of State Highway and Transportation Officials (AASHTO) still had US 301 follow US 40 between DE 896 in Glasgow and I-295/US 13 in Farnhurst.

There are plans to widen the portion of US 40 from Salem Church Road/Porter Road east to Walther Road/Glendale Boulevard in Bear from four lanes to six lanes. The widening project is planned to begin in 2024 and be finished in 2027.

== Major intersections ==
The entire route is in New Castle County.

Location	mi	km	Destinations	Notes
Glasgow	0.00	0.00	US 40 west (Pulaski Highway) – Elkton	Maryland state line
Glasgow	2.12	3.41	DE 896 Bus. (Glasgow Avenue) – Glasgow	
Glasgow	2.33	3.75	DE 896 (South College Avenue/Summit Bridge Road) to I-95 – Newark, Middletown, Dover, Annapolis	
Glasgow	3.70	5.95	DE 72 (Sunset Lake Road/Wrangle Hill Road) – Newark, Delaware City	
Bear	7.15	11.51	DE 7 (Bear Christiana Road/Bear Corbitt Road)	
Bear	7.71	12.41	DE 1 – Christiana, Wilmington, Dover	DE 1 exit 160
State Road	9.84	15.84	US 13 south (South Dupont Highway / DE 9 Truck south) to DE 1 / US 301 – Dover, Beaches	No access from northbound US 13 to westbound US 40; west end of US 13/DE 9 Truck overlap
Hares Corner	10.88	17.51	DE 273 / DE 9 Truck north (Christiana Road/Frenchtown Road) – Christiana, Newark, New Castle	East end of DE 9 Truck overlap
Wilmington Manor	12.11	19.49	US 202 north / DE 141 – New Castle, Newport	US 202/DE 141 exit 1; southern terminus of US 202
Wilmington Manor	13.40	21.57	Western end of freeway section	
Wilmington Manor	13.40	21.57	I-295 south to I-95 / I-495 north – Port of Wilmington, Philadelphia, Baltimore US 13 north (North Dupont Highway) to I-495 – Wilmington, Philadelphia	East end of US 13 overlap; west end of I-295 overlap
Wilmington Manor	14.35	23.09	Landers Lane	Eastbound exit only; no trucks over 5000 lbs
Holloway Terrace	14.67	23.61	DE 9 – New Castle, Wilmington	Access to Veterans Memorial Park, Delaware River and Bay Authority Headquarters, and Historic New Castle
Holloway Terrace			Delaware River and Bay Authority Headquarters	Westbound exit and entrance; eastbound access provided by DE 9
Delaware River	17.18	27.65	Delaware Memorial Bridge (westbound toll)	
Delaware River	17.18	27.65	I-295 north / N.J. Turnpike north / US 40 east – New Jersey, New York	New Jersey state line
1.000 mi = 1.609 km; 1.000 km = 0.621 mi: Concurrency terminus; Incomplete access; Tolled

== See also ==
U.S. Route 40
Previous state: Maryland	Delaware	Next state: New Jersey
