= U.S. Route 202 in Delaware =

Highway in Delaware

U.S. Route 202
- US 202 highlighted in red

Route information
- Maintained by DelDOT
- Length: 12.65 mi (20.36 km)
- Existed: 1934–present

Major junctions
- South end: US 13 / US 40 / DE 141 in Wilmington Manor
- DE 37 near Wilmington Manor; I-95 / I-295 / I-495 / DE 141 near Newport; DE 4 / DE 9 in Wilmington; DE 52 in Wilmington; I-95 / DE 202 in Wilmington; DE 141 / DE 261 near Fairfax; DE 92 in Brandywine
- North end: US 202 at Pennsylvania border near Brandywine

Location
- Country: United States
- State: Delaware
- Counties: New Castle

Highway system
- United States Numbered Highway System; List; Special; Divided; Delaware State Route System; List; Byways
← DE 141	→ DE 202
← US 113	US 122	→ DE 141

U.S. Route 202 (US 202) is a US Highway running from New Castle, Delaware, northeast to Bangor, Maine. The southernmost section of the route in the U.S. state of Delaware passes through northern New Castle County. It runs from its southern terminus at an interchange with US 13/US 40 near the Wilmington Airport north to the Pennsylvania state line in Brandywine Hundred. The route passes east of the airport concurrent with Delaware Route 141 (DE 141) before coming to an interchange with Interstate 95 (I-95). At this point, US 202 heads northeast along with I-95 through Wilmington. Just north of Wilmington, US 202 splits from I-95 by running north on Concord Pike through the suburban Brandywine Hundred area to the Pennsylvania state line. US 202 is a multilane divided highway the entire length across Delaware, with the section concurrent with I-95 a freeway.

The Concord Pike was originally chartered as the Wilmington and Great Valley Turnpike in 1811, a turnpike that was to connect Wilmington to Great Valley, Pennsylvania. The Concord Pike between US 13 in Wilmington and the Pennsylvania state line became a part of US 122 in 1926. In 1934, US 122 was renumbered to US 202 and the road was realigned to head southwest and end at US 13 and US 40 in State Road. In the 1950s, the Concord Pike north of Wilmington was widened into a divided highway. By 1954, US 202 was realigned to follow US 13 northbound and Washington Street southbound through downtown Wilmington. The southern terminus was cut back to I-295 in Farnhurst in 1964. In 1970, the south end of US 202 was truncated to the I-95 interchange north of Wilmington. DE 202 was designated along Concord Avenue in 1981. US 202 was extended south to its current terminus in 1984.

== Route description ==
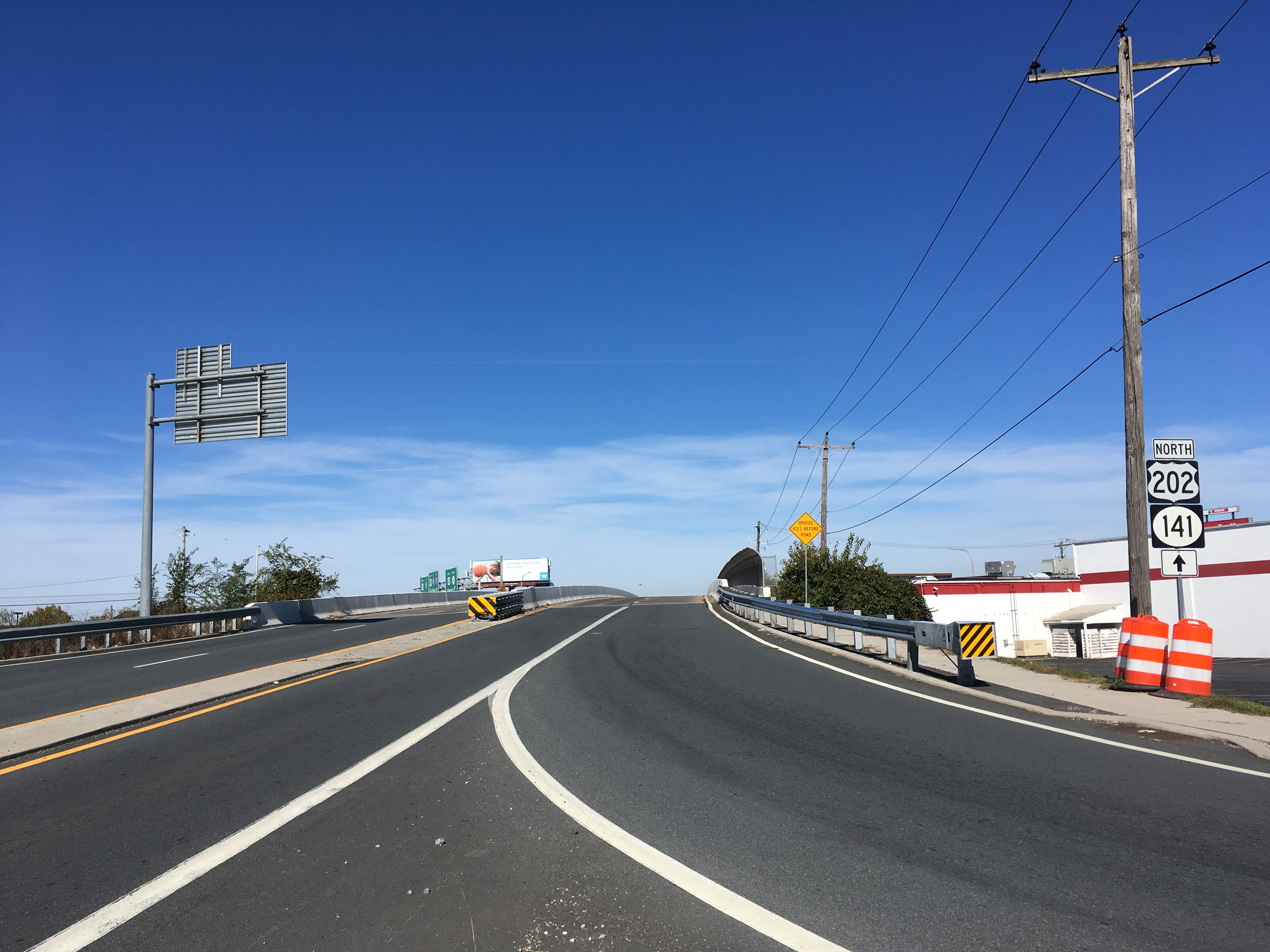
US 202 northbound concurrent with DE 141 at its southern terminus at the US 13/US 40 interchange in Wilmington Manor

US 202 begins at a partial cloverleaf interchange with US 13/US 40 east of the Wilmington Airport, with the road continuing south toward the city of New Castle as DE 141. From the southern terminus, US 202 heads north-northwest concurrent with DE 141 on four-lane divided Basin Road, passing between Wilmington Airport to the west and residential neighborhoods in Wilmington Manor to the east. The road passes between the Delaware Air National Guard's New Castle Air National Guard Base to the west and commercial establishments to the east, coming to a junction with the northern terminus of DE 37. Past this junction, the median of US 202/DE 141 widens as the road intersects Airport Road and becomes a freeway. The road comes to an interchange with I-95 (Delaware Turnpike) and the southern terminus of I-295.

Here, US 202 splits from DE 141 and heads to the east along I-95, an eight-lane freeway with a wide median. I-295 splits off to the east before the freeway curves northeast and has an interchange with the southern terminus of I-495. Following this, I-95/US 202 becomes a six-lane freeway and heads through marshland, crossing the Christina River. The freeway comes to bridges over Norfolk Southern's Shellpot Secondary and Little Mill Creek as it continues through more wetlands west of the Russell W. Peterson Urban Wildlife Refuge, with Amtrak's Northeast Corridor running parallel a short distance to the northwest. The road enters the city of Wilmington and curves to the north, passing to the west of Daniel S. Frawley Stadium, which is home of the Wilmington Blue Rocks baseball team, and the Chase Center on the Riverfront convention center as it heads west of the Wilmington Riverfront. I-95/US 202 continues towards downtown Wilmington and crosses onto a viaduct, passing over Norfolk Southern's Wilmington & Northern Running Track and the Northeast Corridor before coming to an interchange with DE 4 and DE 48 that provides access to the downtown area and the Wilmington Riverfront.

At this point, the four-lane freeway continues northeast, with one-way northbound North Adams Street to the east and one-way southbound North Jackson Street to the west serving as frontage roads. I-95/US 202 continues through residential areas to the west of downtown Wilmington and passes over DE 9, with a southbound exit. Farther northeast, the freeway heads into an alignment below street level and comes to an interchange with DE 52. Past this interchange, the road continues north and crosses Brandywine Creek, heading through Brandywine Park, which is a part of the Wilmington State Parks complex. The freeway curves northeast again and passes under CSX's Philadelphia Subdivision before reaching a modified cloverleaf interchange with the northern terminus of DE 202 at the northern edge of Wilmington, at which point US 202 splits from I-95.

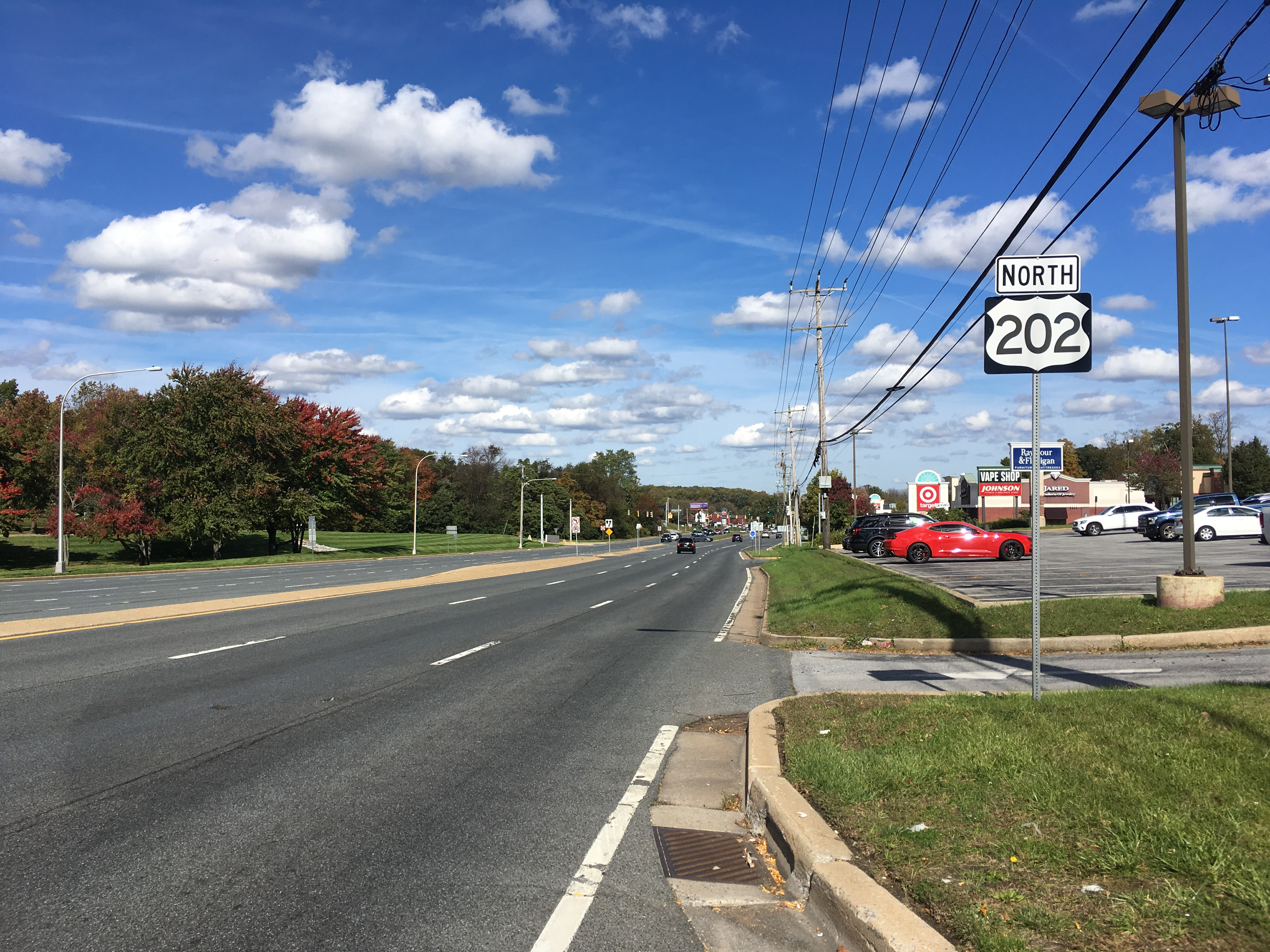
US 202 northbound past DE 92 north of Wilmington

Upon splitting from I-95, US 202 heads north on the six-lane divided Concord Pike into the Brandywine Hundred area, running between Alapocas Run State Park to the west and the Rock Manor Golf Course to the east and passing over East Park Drive before coming to an interchange with the northern terminus of DE 141 and the southern terminus of DE 261 in Blue Ball that also provides access to the Augustine Cut-off. At this interchange, the southbound shoulder becomes a bus lane. Past this interchange, the road enters Fairfax and intersects Powder Mill Road/Murphy Road, where the southbound shoulder bus lane ends. The route passes between AstraZeneca's North American headquarters to the west and businesses to the east. The route continues through commercial areas, heading into Talleyville. At this point, the median of the road widens to include businesses in it as it comes to the intersection with Garden of Eden Road/Silverside Road. The median narrows again as the road curves to the north-northeast, crossing Rocky Run. US 202 passes to the west of the Widener University Delaware Law School and the Concord Mall and east of the Brandywine Campus of Wilmington University before it reaches an intersection with DE 92 in Brandywine. Past this intersection, the route runs between business parks to the west and the Brandywine Town Center shopping center to the east. A park and ride lot is located at the Brandywine Town Center. The road narrows to four lanes as it passes farm fields and homes. US 202 reaches the Pennsylvania state line, where it continues into that state as Wilmington-West Chester Pike.

US 202 in Delaware has an annual average daily traffic count ranging from a high of 118,720 vehicles at the south end of Wilmington along the I-95 concurrency to a low of 30,643 vehicles at the intersection with Augustine Cut-Off between I-95 and DE 141/DE 261. The entire length of US 202 in Delaware is part of the National Highway System.

== History ==
U.S. Route 122
- Location: Wilmington–Brandywine Hundred
- Length: 6.15 mi (9.90 km)
- Existed: 1926–1934

The Wilmington and Great Valley Turnpike Company was chartered on January 23, 1811 to build a turnpike running north from Wilmington along the Concord road, continuing to West Chester and Great Valley in Pennsylvania. Construction on the turnpike progressed throughout the 1810s. The Wilmington and Great Valley Turnpike was known in Delaware as the Concord Pike. The Concord Pike was taken over by New Castle County in 1911, at which point the tolls were removed. A portion of the Concord Pike near Talleyville was incorporated into the state highway system by 1920, with the remainder of the road proposed to become a state highway. By 1924, the Concord Pike between Blue Ball and Talleyville was a state highway, with the remainder remaining a county road. A year later, what is now US 202 along Basin Road was completed as a state highway. When the US Highway System was established in 1926, US 122 was designated to follow the Concord Pike between US 13 (Philadelphia Pike) in Wilmington and the Pennsylvania state line, heading north into that state and continuing to US 22 at Whitehouse, New Jersey.

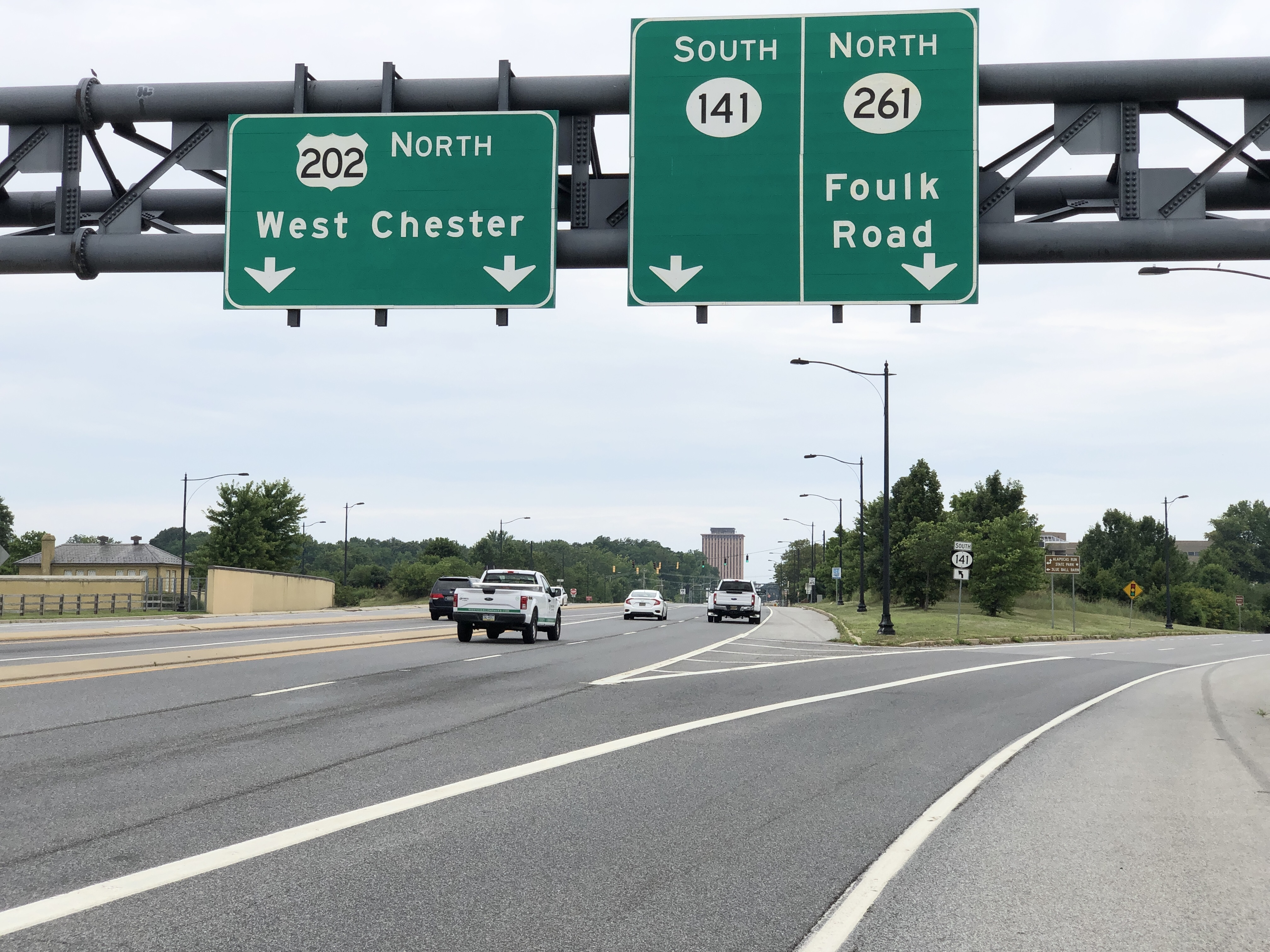
US 202 northbound at the interchange with DE 141/DE 261 in Blue Ball

In 1934, US 122 was redesignated US 202. Also at this time, US 202 was realigned in Wilmington to head southwest from Concord Avenue onto Baynard Boulevard, splitting into a one-way pair following Washington Street southbound and West Street northbound as it passed through downtown Wilmington. In this area, US 202 turned east onto Front Street to an intersection with US 13. From here, US 202 headed south concurrent with US 13 to an intersection with US 13 and US 40 in State Road. On July 1, 1935, the portion of the route between Talleyville and the Pennsylvania state line was taken over by the state. In 1941, the portion of US 202 along Baynard Boulevard and from Talleyville to the Pennsylvania state line was reconstructed.

In 1953, the portion of US 202 along the Concord Pike between the Wilmington border and Murphy Road was widened into a four-lane divided highway. In September 1953, construction began to widen the portion of US 202 between Murphy Road and Talleyville into a four-lane divided highway. This widening was completed in October 1954. In 1955, recommendations were made to widen US 202 between Talleyville and the Pennsylvania state line. The divided highway was extended north from Talleyville to the Pennsylvania state line in 1957.

By 1954, US 202 was moved onto a new one-way pair through downtown Wilmington, with the southbound direction splitting from Concord Avenue to follow Baynard Boulevard to Washington Street and the northbound direction following US 13 on one-way Walnut Street and two-way Market Street before heading north onto Concord Avenue. In 1964, the southern terminus of US 202 was cut back from State Road to an interchange with I-295/US 40 in Farnhurst; this interchange also served as the northern terminus of US 301, which was extended along US 13/US 40 from its previous terminus at State Road to Farnhurst. By 1966, the portion of I-95 that currently carries US 202 was completed between DE 141 and downtown Wilmington. I-95 was completed between downtown Wilmington and the Concord Pike in 1969.

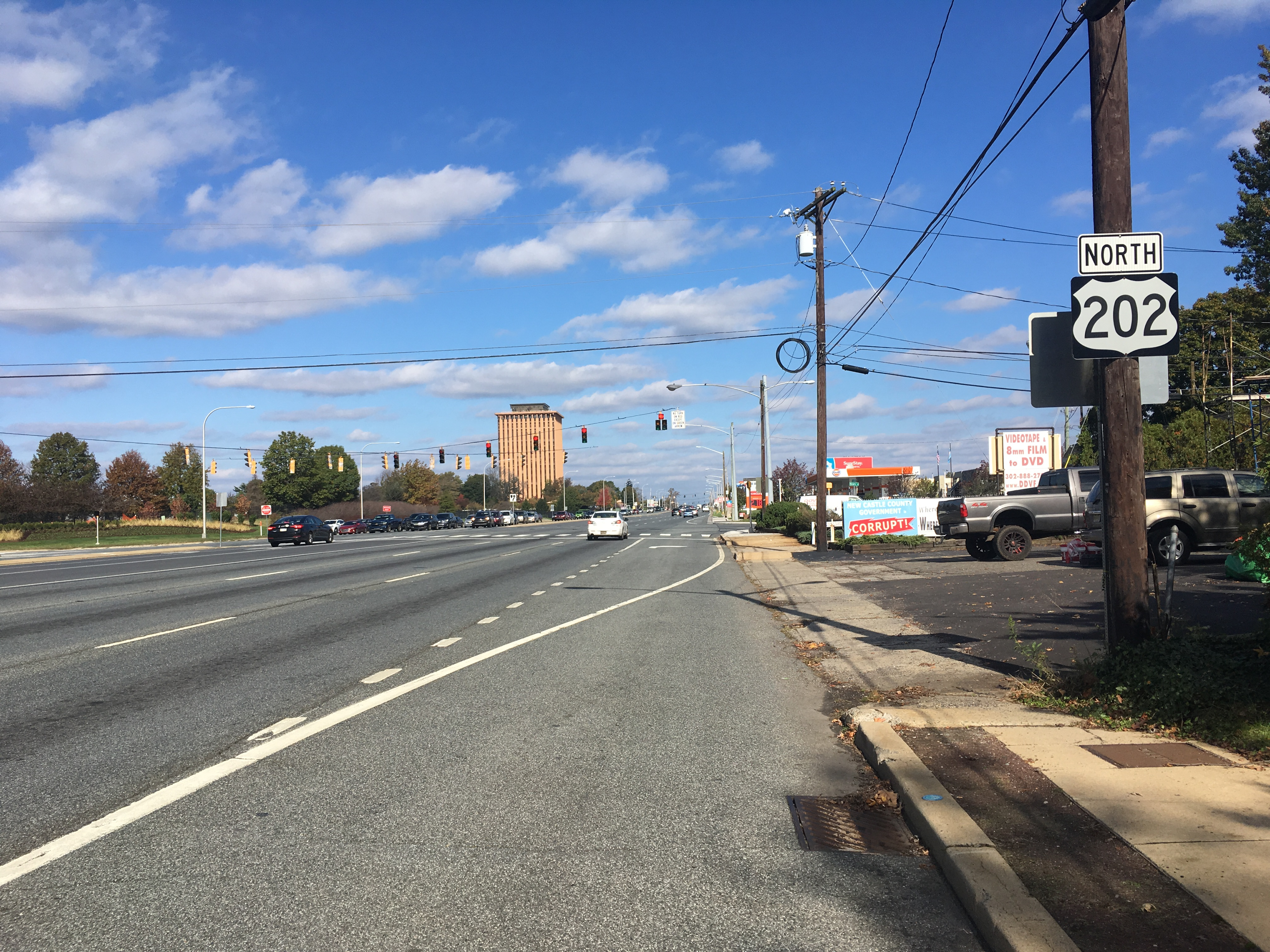
US 202 northbound along Concord Pike in Fairfax

In 1970, the southern terminus of US 202 was truncated to the interchange with I-95 north of Wilmington. By 1981, DE 202 was designated along Concord Avenue between US 13 Bus. and I-95, extending south from the southern terminus of US 202. US 202 was extended south to its current terminus at US 13/US 40 near the Wilmington Airport in 1984, following I-95 through Wilmington before heading south along DE 141.

In 1992, plans were made to build an interchange with DE 141 and DE 261 north of I-95; however, plans for the proposed interchange were placed on hold two years later. In 2000, the portion of US 202 between I-95 and DE 141 (Powder Mill Road) was improved, with the alignment shifted to eliminate a few curves, the intersections at DE 261 and DE 141 improved, and a southbound transit lane added. In the 2000s, the Blue Ball Construction Project built an interchange at DE 261 that also relocated the northern terminus of DE 141 from the Powder Mill Road intersection further north. This interchange was constructed as part of the Blue Ball Properties project, a project undertaken to improve roads in this area as part of AstraZeneca locating their North American headquarters to the area. The project took place between 2002 and 2007 and cost $123 million.

In December 2011, a project began to improve the interchange between I-95 and US 202/DE 202 in order to reduce congestion. The project widened the ramp between northbound I-95 and northbound US 202 to two lanes, the ramp between southbound US 202 and southbound I-95 was extended to modern standards, and the ramp between southbound I-95 and southbound DE 202 was relocated from a cloverleaf loop to a directional ramp that intersects DE 202 at a signalized intersection. In addition, the interchange ramps were repaved and bridges were rehabilitated. The project was finished in July 2015, months behind schedule due to the closure of I-495 in 2014. On August 7, 2015, a dedication ceremony to mark the completion of the project was held, with Governor Jack Markell, Senator Tom Carper, and DelDOT secretary Jennifer Cohan in attendance. The project, which cost over $33 million, was 80-percent funded by the federal government.

On September 25, 2017, the section of US 202 along Concord Pike between I-95 and the Pennsylvania state line was dedicated as the Gold Star Highway in honor of families of military members who died in service, with Governor John Carney and DelDOT secretary Cohan in attendance at a dedication ceremony.

== Major intersections ==
The entire route is in New Castle County.

Location	mi	km	Exit	Destinations	Notes
Wilmington Manor	0.00	0.00		DE 141 south (Basin Road) – New Castle	Continuation beyond US 13/US 40; south end of DE 141 overlap
Wilmington Manor	0.00	0.00	1A	US 13 north / US 40 east – Wilmington, Delaware Memorial Bridge	Interchange; southern terminus
Wilmington Manor	0.00	0.00	1B	US 13 south / US 40 west – Dover, Elkton, Baltimore	Interchange; no northbound exit
Wilmington Manor	1.02	1.64		DE 37 south (Commons Boulevard)	Northern terminus of DE 37
Wilmington Manor			South end of freeway section		
Newport			2	I-295 north – Delaware Memorial Bridge, New Jersey	Southern terminus of I-295; southbound exit
Newport	1.51	2.43	3A; 5B	I-95 south – Newark, Baltimore DE 141 north – Newport	North end of DE 141 overlap; South end of I-95 overlap
Newport	3.60	5.79	5D	I-495 north – Port of Wilmington, Philadelphia	Southern terminus of I-495; northbound exit and southbound entrance; exit number not signed
Newport	4.29	6.90	5C	I-295 north – New Castle, Delaware Memorial Bridge	Southbound exit and northbound entrance
Wilmington	5.73	9.22	6	DE 4 (Maryland Avenue) / Martin Luther King Jr. Boulevard (DE 48)	No southbound exit; to DE 9; access to Wilmington station and Wilmington Riverfront
Wilmington	6.40	10.30	6	DE 9 (Fourth Street) / Martin Luther King Jr. Boulevard (DE 48)	Southbound exit and entrance; to DE 4; access to Wilmington station
Wilmington	6.63	10.67	7	DE 52 (Delaware Avenue)	Split into exits 7A (south) and 7B (north) southbound; access to Downtown Wilmington and Brandywine Valley Attractions
Wilmington	7.87	12.67	8	I-95 north – Chester, Philadelphia DE 202 south (Concord Avenue) – Wilmington	North end of I-95 overlap; northern terminus of DE 202
Wilmington			North end of freeway section		
Blue Ball	8.26	13.29		DE 141 south (Powder Mill Road) / DE 261 north (Foulk Road) / Augustine Cut-off	Interchange; northern terminus of DE 141; southern terminus of DE 261
Brandywine	11.87	19.10		DE 92 (Beaver Valley Road / Naamans Road) – Claymont, Philadelphia	
Brandywine	12.65	20.36		US 202 north (Wilmington–West Chester Pike) – West Chester	Pennsylvania state line
1.000 mi = 1.609 km; 1.000 km = 0.621 mi: Concurrency terminus; Incomplete access

== See also ==
U.S. Route 202
Previous state: Terminus	Delaware	Next state: Pennsylvania
