= Delaware Route 202 =

State highway in Wilmington, Delaware, United States

Delaware Route 202
- Concord Avenue

Route information
- Maintained by DelDOT
- Length: 1.01 mi (1.63 km)
- Existed: 1981–present

Major junctions
- South end: US 13 Bus. in Wilmington
- North end: I-95 / US 202 in Blue Ball

Location
- Country: United States
- State: Delaware
- Counties: New Castle

Highway system
- Delaware State Route System; List; Byways
← US 202	→ DE 261

Delaware Route 202 (DE 202), also known as Concord Avenue, is a short state highway mostly within Wilmington, Delaware. It runs from U.S. Route 13 Business (US 13 Bus., North Market Street) north to a modified cloverleaf interchange with Interstate 95 (I-95) and US 202 just beyond the northern city limits. North of the interchange, the route becomes US 202 northbound, also known as the Concord Pike. The road is two lanes and undivided for most of its length except for the part just south of the I-95 interchange, which is four lanes and divided. DE 202 was a part of US 202 until that highway was truncated to the I-95 interchange in 1970. DE 202 was designated by 1981.

== Route description ==
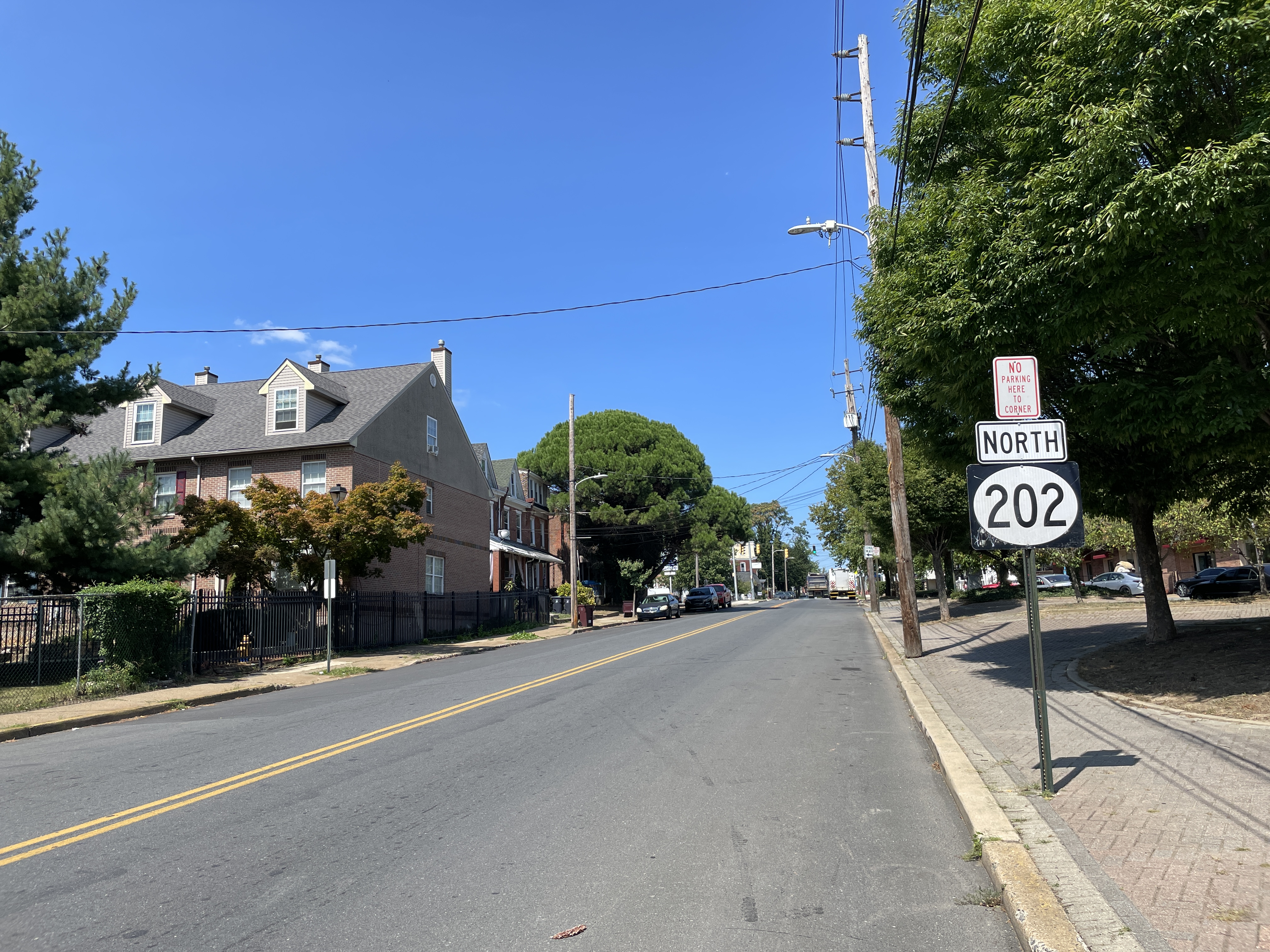
DE 202 northbound past US 13 Bus. in Wilmington

DE 202 begins at an intersection with US 13 Bus. (North Market Street) in the city of Wilmington, heading north on two-lane undivided Concord Avenue. The road passes homes and businesses in the northern part of the city. Concord Avenue crosses several streets including Washington Street and Baynard Boulevard. At the intersection with the latter, the road becomes four lanes and becomes a divided highway at the Franklin Street intersection. After passing under CSX’s Philadelphia Subdivision railroad line, DE 202 exits the Wilmington city limits and reaches a modified cloverleaf interchange with I-95 and US 202 (Wilmington Expressway), where DE 202 ends and the road continues north as part of US 202 (Concord Pike).

DE 202 has an annual average daily traffic count ranging from a high of 25,465 vehicles at the north end of Wilmington to a low of 6,869 vehicles at the Baynard Boulevard intersection. The entire length of DE 202 is part of the National Highway System.

== History ==
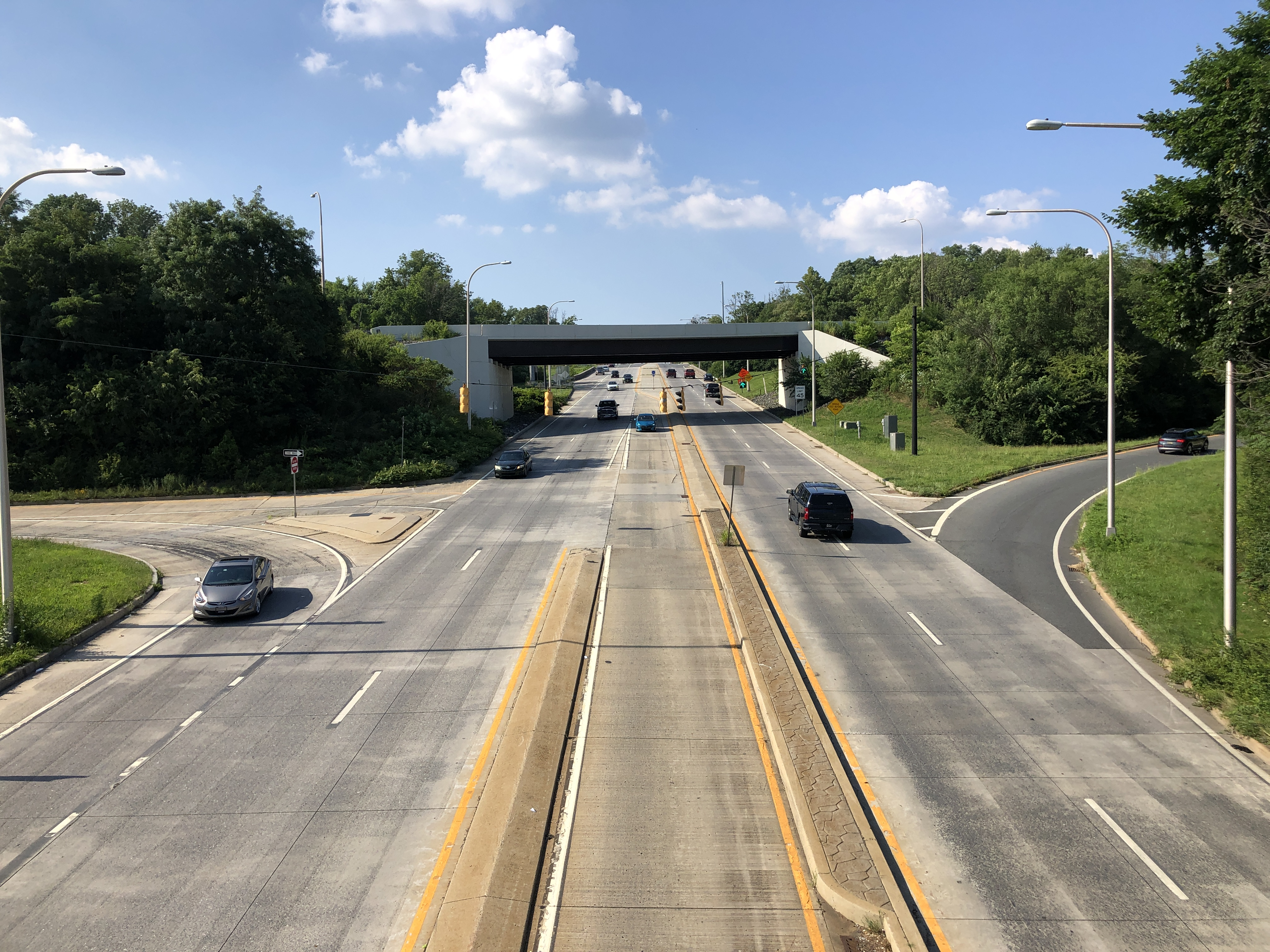
DE 202 northbound approaching I-95/US 202 in Blue Ball, just north of the Wilmington city limits

When the U.S. Highway System was created in 1926, what is now DE 202 was designated as the southernmost part of US 122, a U.S. highway that ran from US 13 in Wilmington north to New Jersey. By the mid-1930s, the US 122 designation was replaced with US 202, and the route was shifted to head southwest from Concord Avenue and continue into downtown Wilmington on Baynard Boulevard. By 1959, US 202 was moved onto a one-way pair through downtown Wilmington, with the southbound direction splitting from Concord Avenue to follow Baynard Boulevard to Washington Street and the northbound direction turning onto Concord Avenue at Market Street (US 13). In 1970, the southern terminus of US 202 was cut back to the I-95 interchange, leaving Concord Avenue unnumbered. DE 202 was designated along Concord Avenue between US 13 Bus. and I-95/US 202 by 1981.

== Major intersections ==
The entire route is in Wilmington, New Castle County.

mi	km	Destinations	Notes
0.00	0.00	US 13 Bus. (North Market Street)	Southern terminus
1.01	1.63	I-95 (US 202 south / Wilmington Expressway) – Chester, Philadelphia, Delaware Memorial Bridge, Baltimore US 202 north (Concord Pike) – Talleyville, West Chester	I-95 exit 8; northern terminus
1.000 mi = 1.609 km; 1.000 km = 0.621 mi
