= William Penn High School (Delaware) =

Coordinates: 39.6687°N 75.5845°W

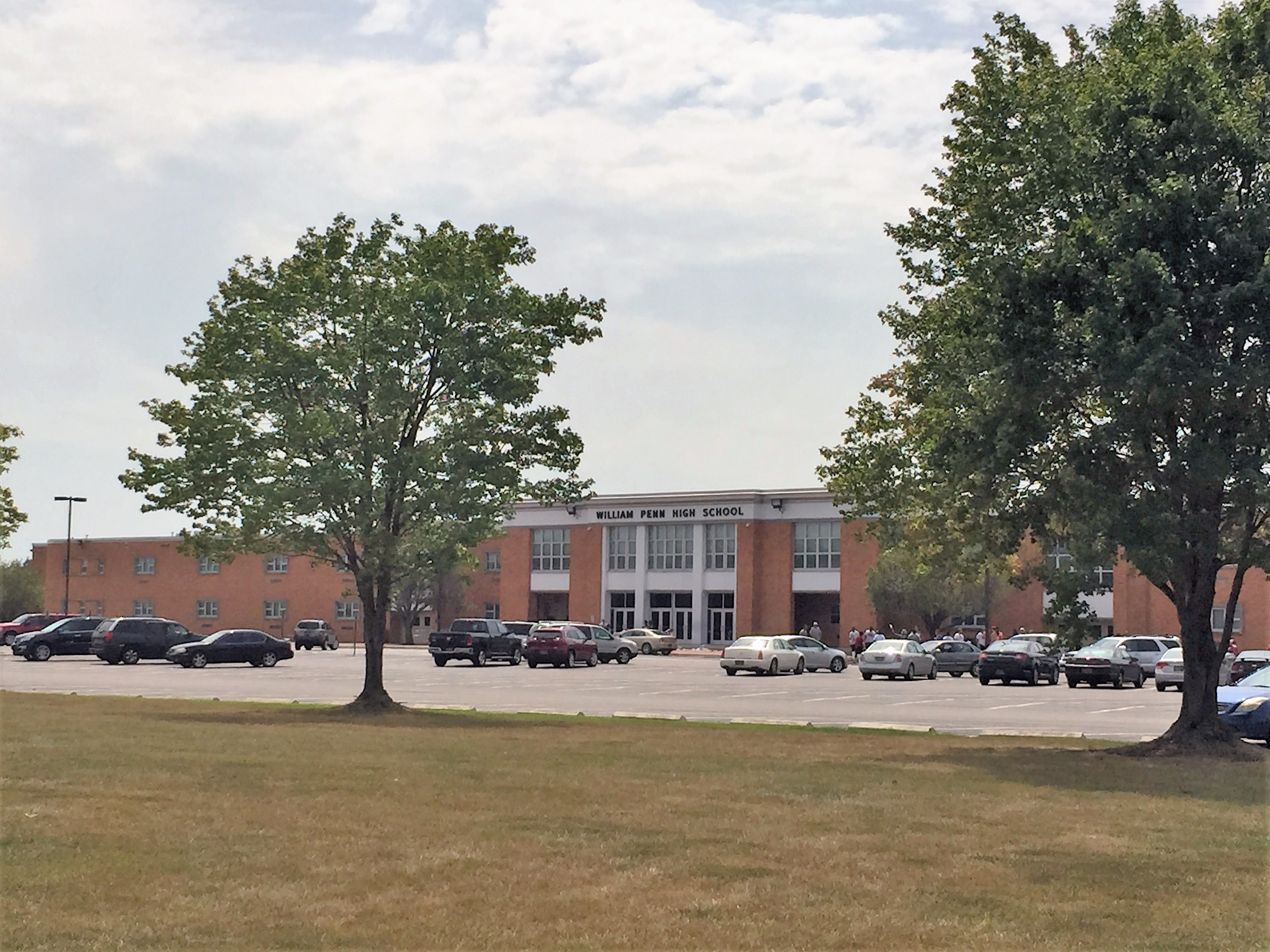

Location
- 713 East Basin Road; New Castle, Delaware 19720; United States

Information
- Type: Public
- Motto: "Where Access Meets Opportunity"
- Established: 1921 (105 years ago)
- CEEB code: 080125
- Teaching staff: 119.00 (FTE)
- Grades: 9 to 12
- Enrollment: 2,077 (2023-2024)
- Student to teacher ratio: 17.45
- Campus type: Suburban
- Colors: Cherry and black
- Athletics conference: Blue Hen Conference - Flight A
- Mascot: Colonial
- Nickname: William Penn, Penn
- Website: williampenn.colonialschooldistrict.org

William Penn High School, also known as William Penn or simply Penn, is a four-year comprehensive, coeducational public high school located in unincorporated New Castle County, Delaware, United States. It is adjacent to the New Castle city limits and has a New Castle postal address. The school is a member of the Colonial School District, and is the largest high school in the state of Delaware. The school mascot is the Colonial.

In addition to New Castle the school district includes Delaware City, Port Penn, St. Georges, Wilmington Manor, portions of Wilmington, and half of Bear.

== History ==
The school was established in 1921. The present building was designed by Wilmington architects Wason, Tingle & Brust and completed in 1966.

== Notable alumni ==
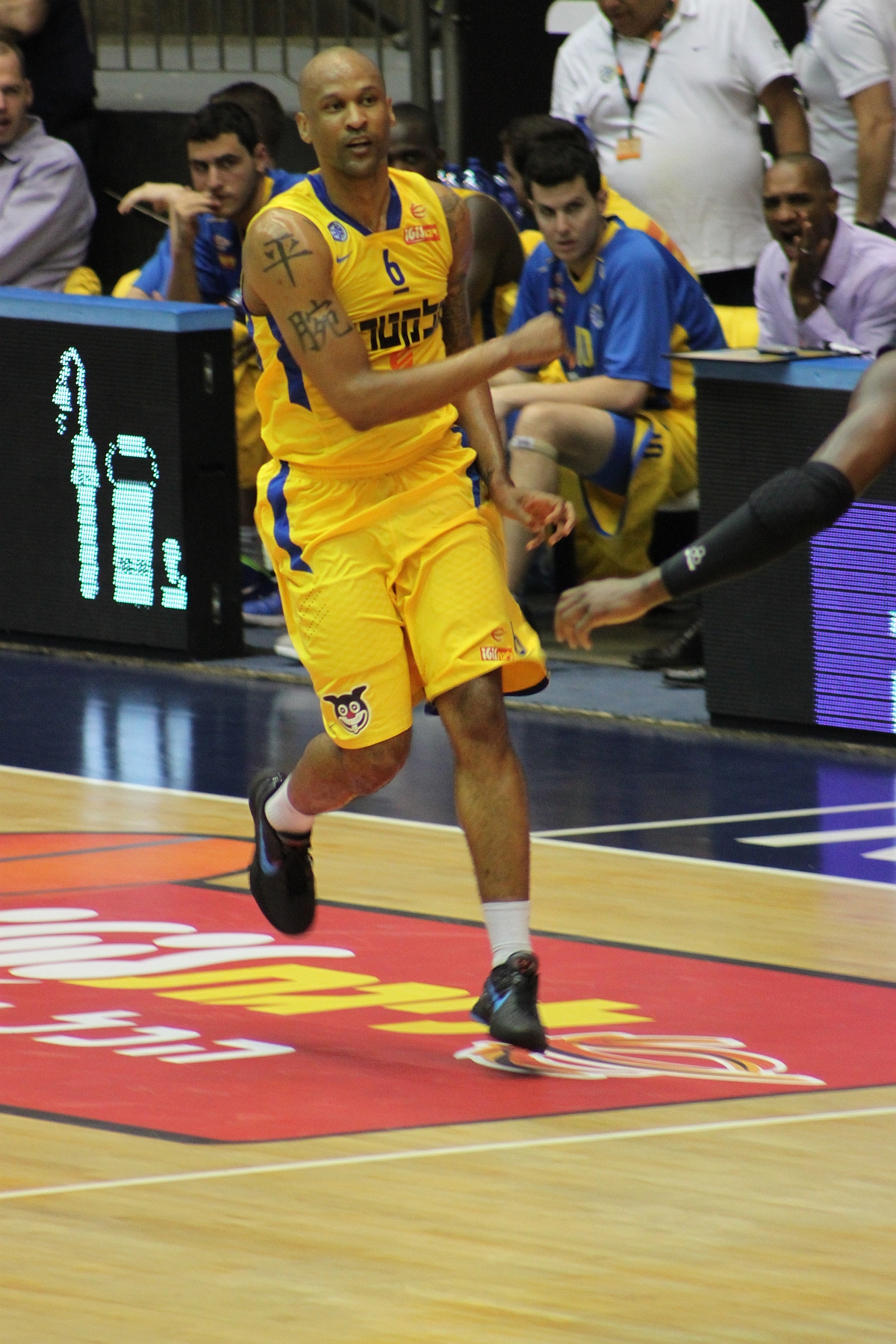
Devin Smith

- Cliff Brumbaugh, baseball player
- Dave May, professional baseball player
- Brett Oberholtzer, baseball player
- Brian Oliver, professional basketball player
- Jeff Otah, professional football player, Carolina Panthers
- Kyle Carter, professional football player, Minnesota Vikings
- Devin Smith, professional basketball player for Maccabi Tel Aviv
- Richard B. Weldon, Jr., former Frederick County (MD) Commissioner and member of the Maryland House of Delegates
- Jheanelle Wilkins, politician and member of the Maryland House of Delegates

== See also ==
- List of high schools in Delaware
- Colonial School District (Delaware)
- William Penn
