= Jeff Otah =

Nigerian gridiron football player (born 1986)

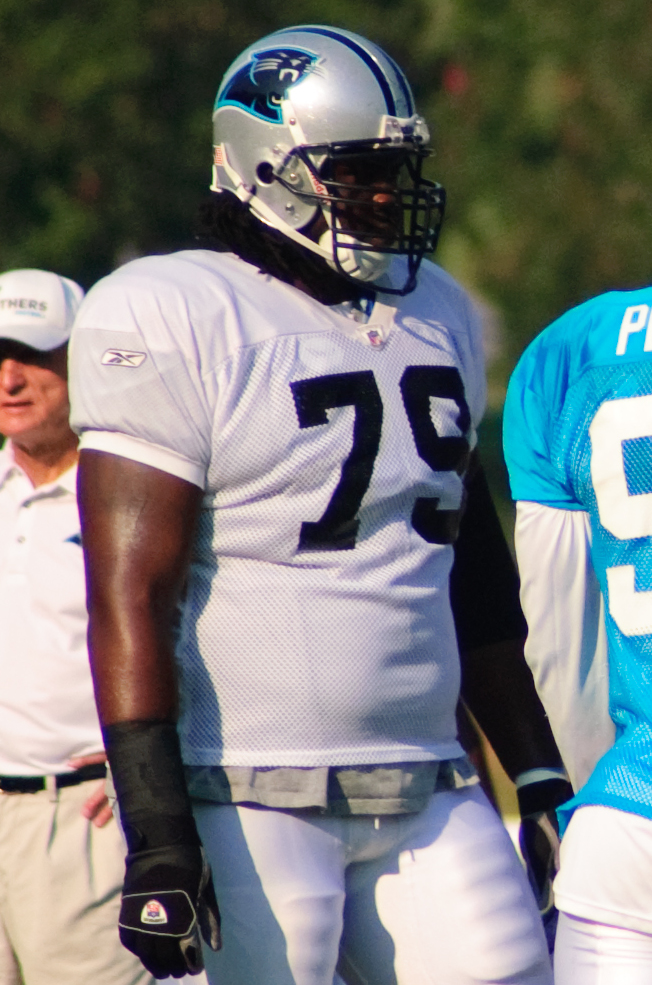
- Otah with the Carolina Panthers in 2009

No. 79
- Position: Offensive tackle

Personal information
- Born: June 17, 1986 (age 40); Nigeria
- Listed height: 6 ft 6 in (1.98 m)
- Listed weight: 330 lb (150 kg)

Career information
- High school: William Penn (New Castle, Delaware, U.S.)
- College: Valley Forge (2004–2005); Pittsburgh (2006–2007)
- NFL draft: 2008: 1st round, 19th overall pick

Career history
- Carolina Panthers (2008–2011)

Awards and highlights
- First-team All-Big East (2007)

Career NFL statistics
- Games played: 29
- Games started: 29
- Stats at Pro Football Reference

Jeffrey C. Otah (born June 17, 1986) is a Nigerian American former professional football offensive tackle. He was selected by the Carolina Panthers in the first round of the 2008 NFL draft.

== Early life ==
Otah moved to The Bronx at the age of seven, then moved to New Castle, Delaware at the age of thirteen. He played high school football at William Penn High School in New Castle, Delaware.

== Professional career ==
Pre-draft measurables
| Height | Weight | Arm length | Hand span | 40-yard dash | 10-yard split | 20-yard split | Vertical jump | Broad jump | Bench press |
|---|---|---|---|---|---|---|---|---|---|
| 6 ft 6 in (1.98 m) | 322 lb (146 kg) | 35 3/8 in (0.90 m) | 9 1/4 in (0.23 m) | 5.28 s | 1.79 s | 3.03 s | 22.5 in (0.57 m) | 8 ft 6 in (2.59 m) | 27 reps |
All values from NFL Combine/Pro Day

Coming into the 2008 NFL draft, Otah was considered by many scouts to be a top tackle prospect. The Carolina Panthers were reportedly very interested in him, evident by them sending head coach John Fox and General Manager Marty Hurney to his pro-day.

Reports of the Panthers being interested in Otah proved to be well founded after the team made a trade with the Philadelphia Eagles to trade up and to select him. He was selected with the 19th pick in the first round. Jeff became an immediate starter at right tackle early in training camp. He started in 12 of the possible 16 games his first season, missing 4 due to injury.

Otah started the 2010 season recovering from what was then thought to be relatively minor knee surgery performed in mid-August. But on 9 November, the Panthers placed Otah on injured reserve, ending his season without him ever taking the field.

Otah's knee problems persisted into the 2011 season, and he was placed on injured reserve again on 19 October 2011, after missing two of six games.

Otah was traded to the New York Jets for an undisclosed draft pick on July 23, 2012 contingent on his passing a physical for the team. After failing the initial test, the Jets placed Otah on the PUP/Active list on July 25. He had seven days to pass the test again or the trade would be nullified. On July 31, Otah failed his second physical thus voiding the trade and returning him to the Panthers. Otah was released by the Panthers two days later.
