= Forts Ferry Crossing =

Ferry system between Delaware and New Jersey, US

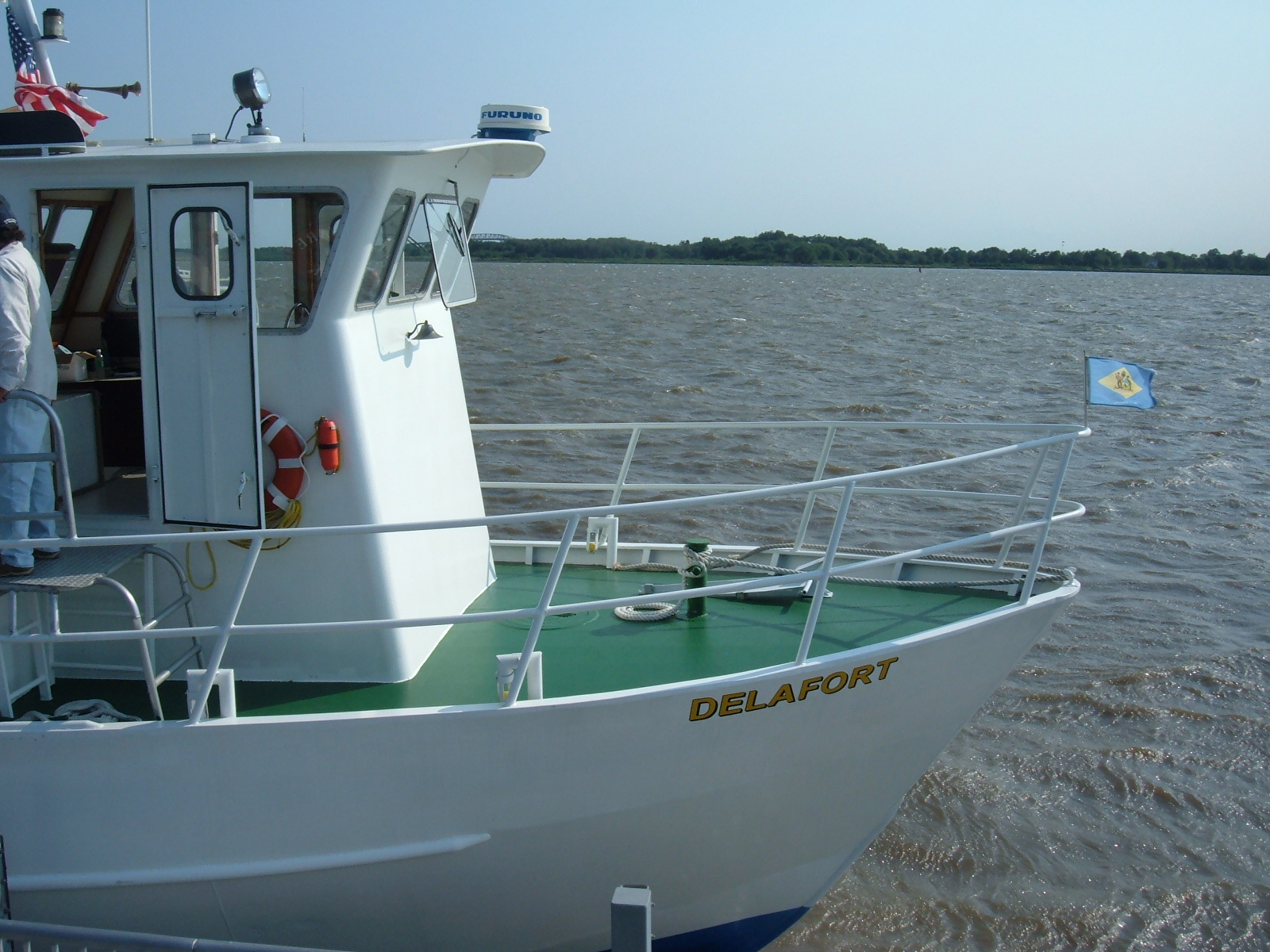
- The Delafort Ferry
- Locale: Fort Mott, New Jersey and Forts DuPont and Delaware, Delaware
- Waterway: Delaware River
- Transit type: Passenger ferry
- Operator: Delaware River and Bay Authority
- No. of lines: 1
- No. of terminals: 3
- Website: Website

The Forts Ferry Crossing (formerly Delaware City–Salem Ferry and Three Forts Ferry Crossing) is a ferry system on the Delaware River that serves Fort DuPont in Delaware City, Delaware; Fort Delaware on Pea Patch Island in the middle of the Delaware River; and Fort Mott in Pennsville Township, New Jersey. It is operated by the Delaware River and Bay Authority (DRBA), a bi-state compact between Delaware and New Jersey. The ferry operates on weekends from the last weekend in April until the last weekend in September, and Wednesday to Sunday between June and Labor Day.

Originally, the ferry ran only between Fort DuPont and Fort Delaware, and it was operated by the Delaware Division of Parks and Recreation. It first operated on this route on July 25, 1954. The DRBA purchased the ferry from the state in April 1997 and added Fort Mott as a third stop on the route, turning it into the Three Forts Ferry Crossing. Becoming easily accessible from New Jersey and usable as a method of crossing the Delaware, ridership on the ferry increased 68 percent in the first year of DRBA operation.

After Hurricane Sandy damaged the pier at Fort Mott during the 2012–2013 offseason, the ferry changed its eastern terminus to Barber's Basin in Salem, New Jersey, with uncertainty on when the state would repair the Fort Mott pier.

In March 2015, DRBA officials announced that the ferry would resume service to Fort Mott and discontinue the use of the Salem pier. The system changed its name from the Delaware City–Salem Ferry to the Forts Ferry Crossing.
