= Colonial School District (Delaware) =

School district in Delaware, United States

Address
- 318 East Basin Road New Castle postal address, Delaware, 19720; United States

District information
- Type: Public
- Grades: PreK–12
- NCES District ID: 1000230

Students and staff
- Students: 9,795
- Teachers: 685.0 (FTE)
- Staff: 661.98 (FTE)
- Student–teacher ratio: 14.3

Other information
- Website: www.colonialschooldistrict.org

The Colonial School District is a public school district serving New Castle Hundred, Delaware. The district offices are located at 318 East Basin Road, in Wilmington Manor, with a New Castle postal address. The superintendent as of 2020 is Dr. Jeffrey Menzer, Ed.D.

In addition to New Castle and Wilmington Manor it includes Delaware City, Port Penn, St. Georges, portions of Wilmington, and half of Bear. Of the four territorial school districts to serve Wilmington, Colonial is the only one which does not operate schools in the Wilmington city limits.

== History ==
Established in 1981, it took a portion of the former New Castle County School District.

== Schools ==
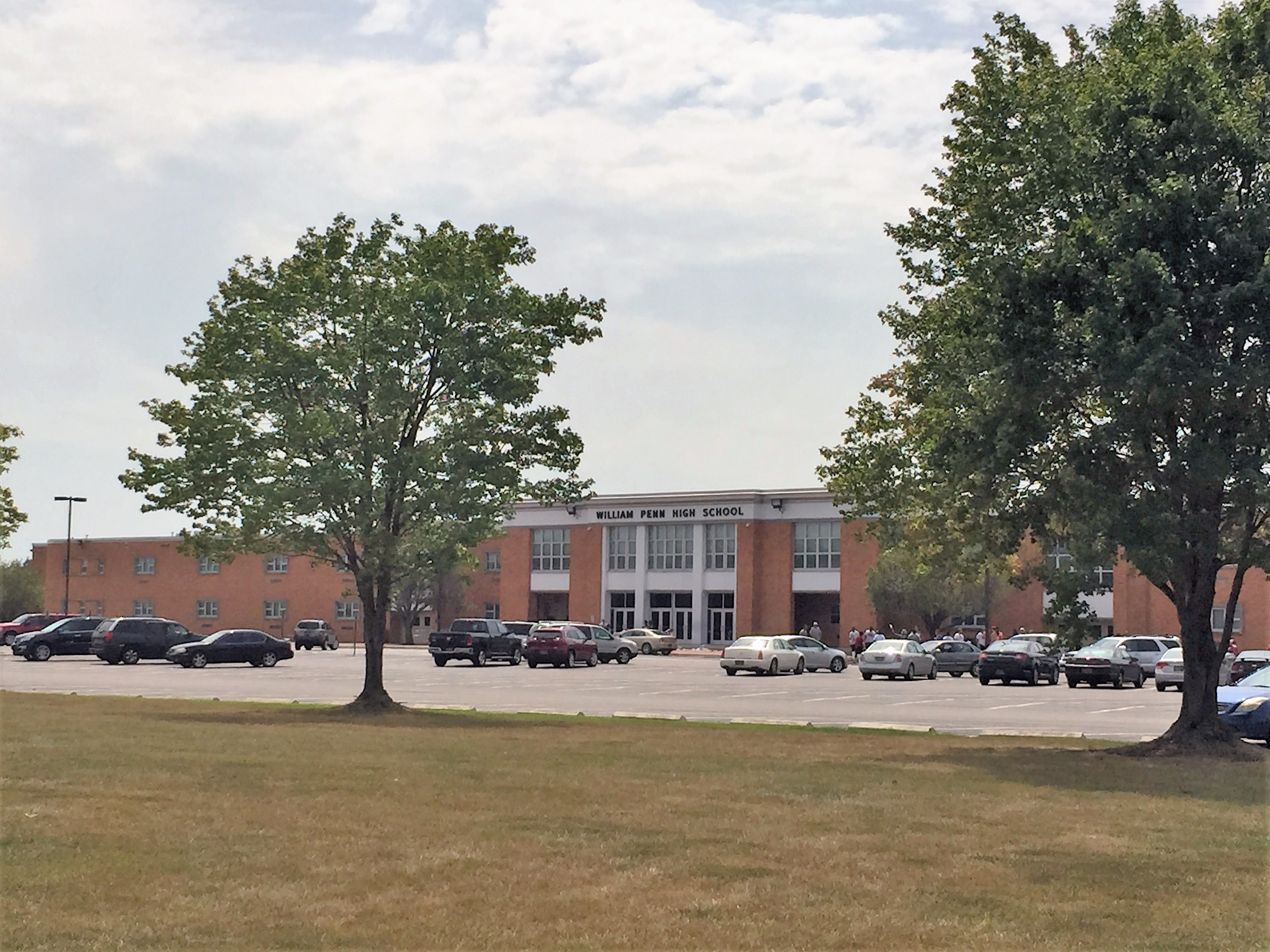
William Penn High School

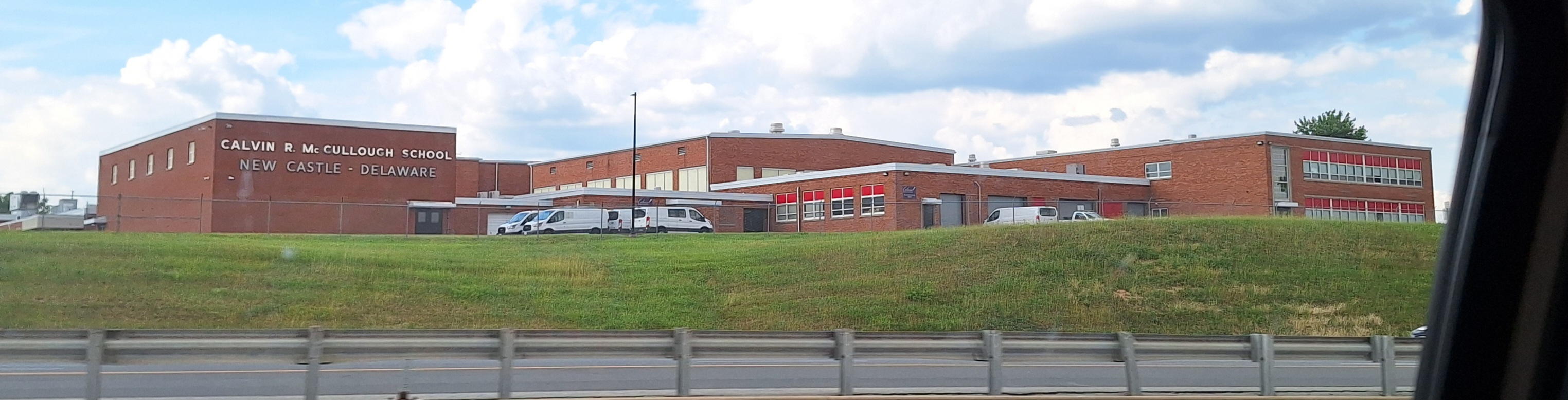
Calvin R. McCullough Middle School

High schools

- William Penn High School

Middle schools

- Calvin R. McCullough Middle School
- George Read Middle School
- Gunning Bedford Middle School

Elementary schools

- Castle Hills Elementary School
- Carrie Downie Elementary School
- The Colwyck Center
- Harry O. Eisenberg Elementary School
- New Castle Elementary School
- Pleasantville Elementary School
- Southern Elementary School
- Wilmington Manor Elementary School
- Kathleen H. Wilbur Elementary School
