= Blue Ball, Delaware =

Unincorporated community in Delaware, United States

- Unincorporated community
- Location within Delaware Location within the United States
- Coordinates: 39°46′38″N 75°32′41″W
- Country: United States
- State: Delaware
- County: New Castle
- Elevation: 295 ft (90 m)
- Time zone: UTC-5 (Eastern (EST))
  - Summer (DST): UTC-4 (EDT)
- Area code: 302
- GNIS feature ID: 216043

Blue Ball is an unincorporated community in New Castle County, Delaware, United States. Blue Ball is located at the junction of U.S. Route 202, Delaware Route 141, and Delaware Route 261, north of Wilmington. It takes its name from an eponymous tavern. The area was originally developed by the Weldin family. Many of the structures in the area have since been demolished.

== See also ==
- Alapocas Run State Park
- Blue Ball Barn
