= State Road, Delaware =

- Unincorporated area
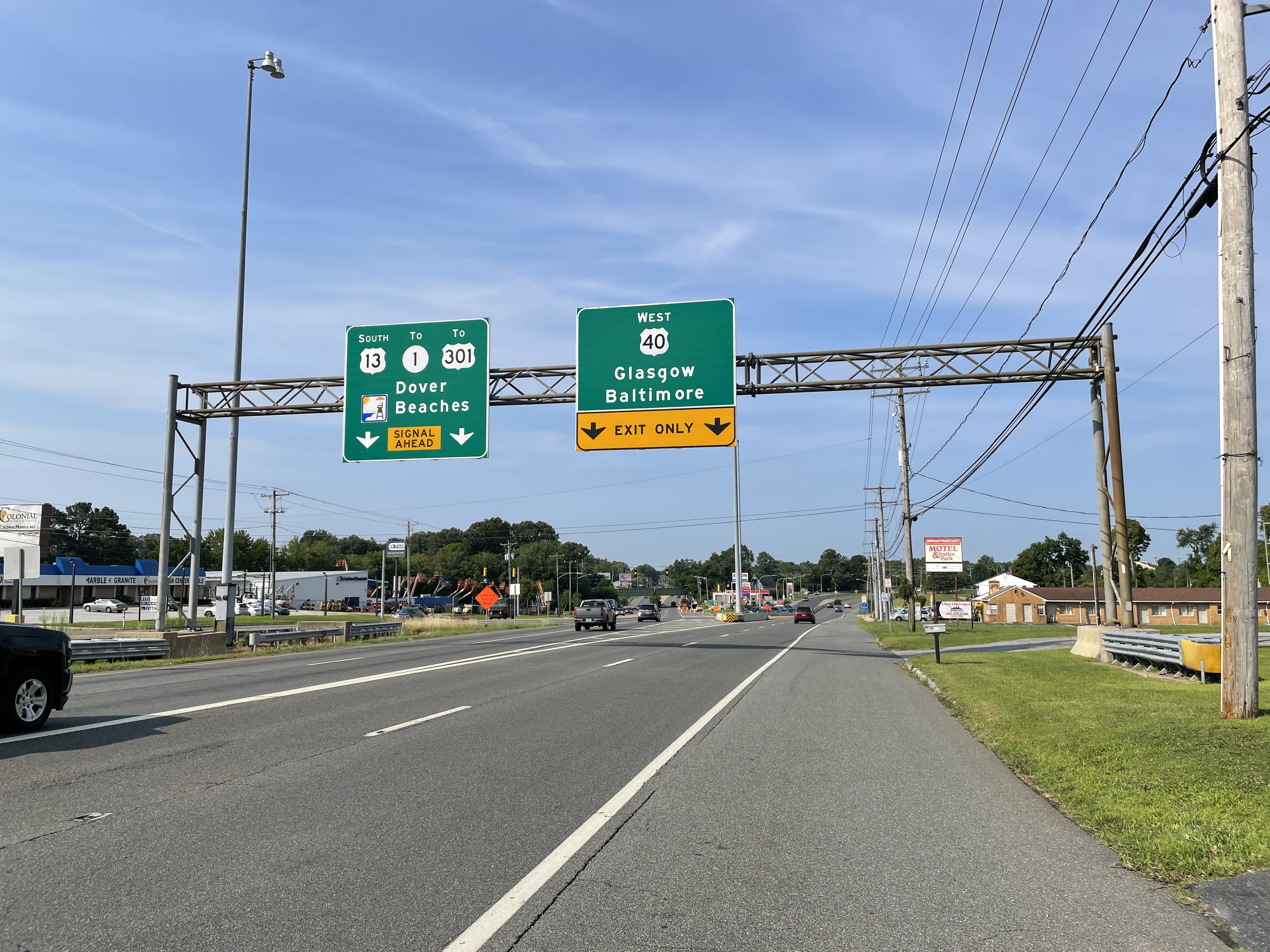
- Split between US 13 and US 40 in State Road

- Location within Delaware Location within the United States
- Coordinates: 39°39′2″N 75°37′22″W
- Country: United States
- State: Delaware
- County: New Castle
- Elevation: 36 ft (11 m)
- Time zone: UTC-5 (Eastern (EST))
  - Summer (DST): UTC-4 (EDT)
- Area code: 302
- GNIS feature ID: 214690

State Road is an unincorporated area in New Castle County, Delaware, United States. State Road is located at the intersection of U.S. Route 13 and U.S. Route 40, southwest of New Castle.

For many years, State Road was the location of a major rest stop on the intercity bus network known as Clemente's Rest, which served buses traveling between the Northeastern United States, the Southern United States, and points on the Delmarva Peninsula. The rest stop billed itself as "the Place Where The Nation Meets and Eats". It had opened in 1951 and closed in 1992, as Greyhound began moving its operations to its Wilmington agency. The area earlier had a stop on the New York, Philadelphia and Norfolk Railroad.
