= Delaware River and Bay Authority =

Delaware and New Jersey, US government agency

Coordinates: 39°41′45″N 75°32′44″W

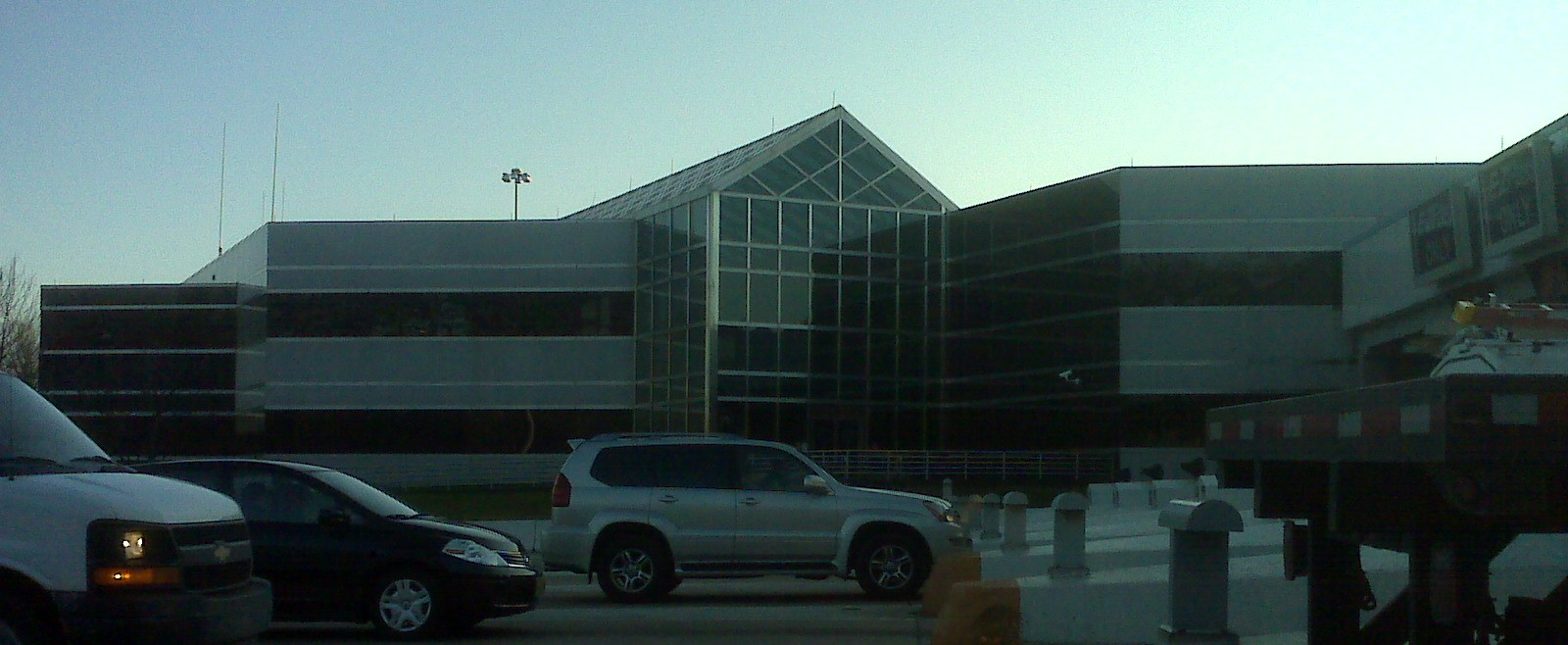
- DRBA headquarters

Agency overview
- Formed: 1962
- Jurisdiction: Delaware and New Jersey
- Headquarters: Delaware Memorial Bridge Plaza 2162 New Castle Ave., New Castle, DE postal address, 19720
- Agency executive: Thomas J. Cook, Executive Director
- Website: www.drba.net

The Delaware River and Bay Authority (DRBA) is a bi-state government agency of the U.S. states of Delaware and New Jersey established by an interstate compact in 1962.

The authority operates the Delaware Memorial twin suspension bridges, the Cape May-Lewes Ferry between Cape May, New Jersey, and Lewes, Delaware, the Forts Ferry Crossing, and the Salem County Business Center.

The authority operates several aviation facilities in both New Jersey and Delaware, including Wilmington Airport (ILG), Cape May Airport, Millville Airport, Delaware Airpark and the Civil Air Terminal at Dover AFB. The Wilmington Airport (ILG) is the largest air facility operated by the DRBA and serves as an FAA backup to Philadelphia International Airport (PHL).

The agency headquarters are in the Delaware Memorial Bridge Plaza, in unincorporated New Castle County, Delaware, with a New Castle postal address.

== Police department ==
Delaware River and Bay Authority Police patch

The Delaware River and Bay Authority Police Department is a law enforcement agency of the DRBA with jurisdiction in both New Jersey and Delaware. The department is mainly responsible for the Delaware Memorial Bridge and surrounding highway, but also provides police services at the Wilmington Airport (and the Corporate Complex located adjacent to the Wilmington Airport), the Civil Air Terminal at Dover Air Force Base, Delaware Airpark in Dover, the Forts Ferry Crossing in Delaware City, the Cape May−Lewes Ferry, Millville Municipal Airport and Cape May Airport.

=== History ===
The department was formed in 1951 as the Delaware Memorial Bridge Police Department. After a compact between the states of Delaware and New Jersey was signed in 1962, the Delaware River and Bay Authority (DRBA) was created. The compact authorized the DRBA to operate the Delaware Memorial Bridge and to form its own police force. DRBA bridge officers were given powers of investigation, detention, and arrest on the crossings, transportation or terminal facilities, and other projects and the approaches thereto, owned, operated, or controlled by the DRBA. As a result of the compact, the Delaware Memorial Bridge Police Department was renamed the Delaware River and Bay Authority Police.

In 1964, the DRBA began a ferry service between Cape May, New Jersey, and Lewes, Delaware. In April 1984, a police station was opened in Cape May, establishing a security presence. Another police station was opened in Lewes in January 1986.

The authority took over airport management and operations at Wilmington Airport following a 30-year lease agreement with New Castle County Council in May 1995 and the FAA's approval in June 1995. In November 1996, the department received the Commission on Accreditation for Law Enforcement Agencies' national accreditation award. In November 2005, the department was re-accredited by CALEA.
