= Wilmington Manor, Delaware =

Census-designated place in Delaware, United States

- CDP
- Nicknames: Manor Park, W.M.
- Location in New Castle County and the state of Delaware.

- Location within the state of Delaware Wilmington Manor (the United States)
- Coordinates: 39°41′12″N 75°35′04″W
- Country: United States
- State: Delaware
- County: New Castle

Area
  - Total: 1.63 sq mi (4.23 km^{2})
  - Land: 1.63 sq mi (4.23 km^{2})
  - Water: 0 sq mi (0.00 km^{2})
- Elevation: 59 ft (18 m)

Population (2020)
  - Total: 8,162
  - Density: 4,995/sq mi (1,928.4/km^{2})
- Time zone: UTC-5 (Eastern (EST))
  - Summer (DST): UTC-4 (EDT)
- ZIP code: 19720
- Area code: 302
- FIPS code: 10-77840
- GNIS feature ID: 214863

Wilmington Manor is a census-designated place (CDP) in north-eastern New Castle County, Delaware, United States. As of the 2020 census, Wilmington Manor had a population of 8,162.

== Geography ==
Wilmington Manor is located at 39°41′12″N 75°35′04″W (39.6867795, -75.5843695). It is just northwest of the city of New Castle and south of the City of Wilmington.

According to the United States Census Bureau, the CDP has a total area of 1.6 square miles (4.1 km^{2}), all land.

== Neighborhoods ==
West Wilmington Manor

- Wilmington Manor Park
- Chelsea Estates
- Leedom Estates
- Hampton Walk

East Wilmington Manor

- Penn Acres
- Schoolside
- Wilmington Manor Gardens
- Stockton

== Demographics ==
Historical population
Census	Pop.	Note	%±
1970	10,134		—
1980	9,233		−8.9%
1990	8,568		−7.2%
2000	8,262		−3.6%
2010	7,889		−4.5%
2020	8,162		3.5%

=== Racial and ethnic composition ===
Wilmington Manor CDP, Delaware – Racial and ethnic composition Note: the US Census treats Hispanic/Latino as an ethnic category. This table excludes Latinos from the racial categories and assigns them to a separate category. Hispanics/Latinos may be of any race.
Race / Ethnicity (NH = Non-Hispanic)	Pop 2000	Pop 2010	Pop 2020	% 2000	% 2010	% 2020
White alone (NH)	6,094	4,855	3,891	73.76%	61.54%	47.67%
Black or African American alone (NH)	888	1,173	1,765	10.75%	14.87%	21.62%
Native American or Alaska Native alone (NH)	14	28	18	0.17%	0.35%	0.22%
Asian alone (NH)	65	84	129	0.79%	1.06%	1.58%
Native Hawaiian or Pacific Islander alone (NH)	5	1	5	0.06%	0.01%	0.06%
Other race alone (NH)	10	34	35	0.12%	0.43%	0.43%
Mixed race or Multiracial (NH)	115	161	290	1.39%	2.04%	3.55%
Hispanic or Latino (any race)	1,071	1,553	2,029	12.96%	19.69%	24.86%
Total	8,262	7,889	8,162	100.00%	100.00%	100.00%

=== 2020 census ===
As of the 2020 census, Wilmington Manor had a population of 8,162. The median age was 38.5 years. 22.7% of residents were under the age of 18 and 15.2% of residents were 65 years of age or older. For every 100 females there were 93.8 males, and for every 100 females age 18 and over there were 92.3 males age 18 and over.

100.0% of residents lived in urban areas, while 0.0% lived in rural areas.

There were 3,051 households in Wilmington Manor, of which 31.4% had children under the age of 18 living in them. Of all households, 40.0% were married-couple households, 20.6% were households with a male householder and no spouse or partner present, and 30.4% were households with a female householder and no spouse or partner present. About 25.5% of all households were made up of individuals and 10.6% had someone living alone who was 65 years of age or older.

There were 3,175 housing units, of which 3.9% were vacant. The homeowner vacancy rate was 1.2% and the rental vacancy rate was 3.0%.

Racial composition as of the 2020 census
Race	Number	Percent
White	4,181	51.2%
Black or African American	1,854	22.7%
American Indian and Alaska Native	60	0.7%
Asian	129	1.6%
Native Hawaiian and Other Pacific Islander	5	0.1%
Some other race	1,101	13.5%
Two or more races	832	10.2%

=== 2010 census ===
In 2010, Wilmington Manor had a population of 7,889 people. The racial makeup of the CDP was 68.6% White, 15.5% African American, 0.5% Native American, 1.1% Asian, 0.0% Pacific Islander, 11.4% from other races, and 3.0% from two or more races. 19.7% of the population were Hispanic or Latino of any race.

=== 2000 census ===
At the 2000 census there were 8,262 people, 3,040 households, and 2,173 families in the CDP. The population density was 5,088.2 inhabitants per square mile (1,964.6/km^{2}). There were 3,173 housing units at an average density of 1,954.1 per square mile (754.5/km^{2}). The racial makeup of the CDP was 79.33% White, 10.95% African American, 0.19% Native American, 0.85% Asian, 0.06% Pacific Islander, 6.69% from other races, and 1.92% from two or more races. Hispanic or Latino of any race were 12.96%.

Of the 3,040 households 31.3% had children under the age of 18 living with them, 52.3% were married couples living together, 13.2% had a female householder with no husband present, and 28.5% were non-families. 22.5% of households were one person and 10.1% were one person aged 65 or older. The average household size was 2.72 and the average family size was 3.14.

The age distribution was 24.8% under the age of 18, 9.4% from 18 to 24, 30.3% from 25 to 44, 21.7% from 45 to 64, and 13.8% 65 or older. The median age was 36 years. For every 100 females, there were 102.5 males. For every 100 females age 18 and over, there were 101.1 males.

The median household income was $43,434 and the median family income was $48,920. Males had a median income of $36,111 versus $27,743 for females. The per capita income for the CDP was $18,934. About 5.5% of families and 9.4% of the population were below the poverty line, including 10.5% of those under age 18 and 6.6% of those age 65 or over.

== Parks and recreation ==
New Castle County maintains Wilmington Manor Gardens. It has a playground and baseball and softball facilities.

== Education ==
The CDP is part of the Colonial School District, which operates William Penn High School.

Wilmington University has its main campus in the CDP.
