= Delaware Memorial Bridge =

Twin suspension bridge between Delaware and New Jersey

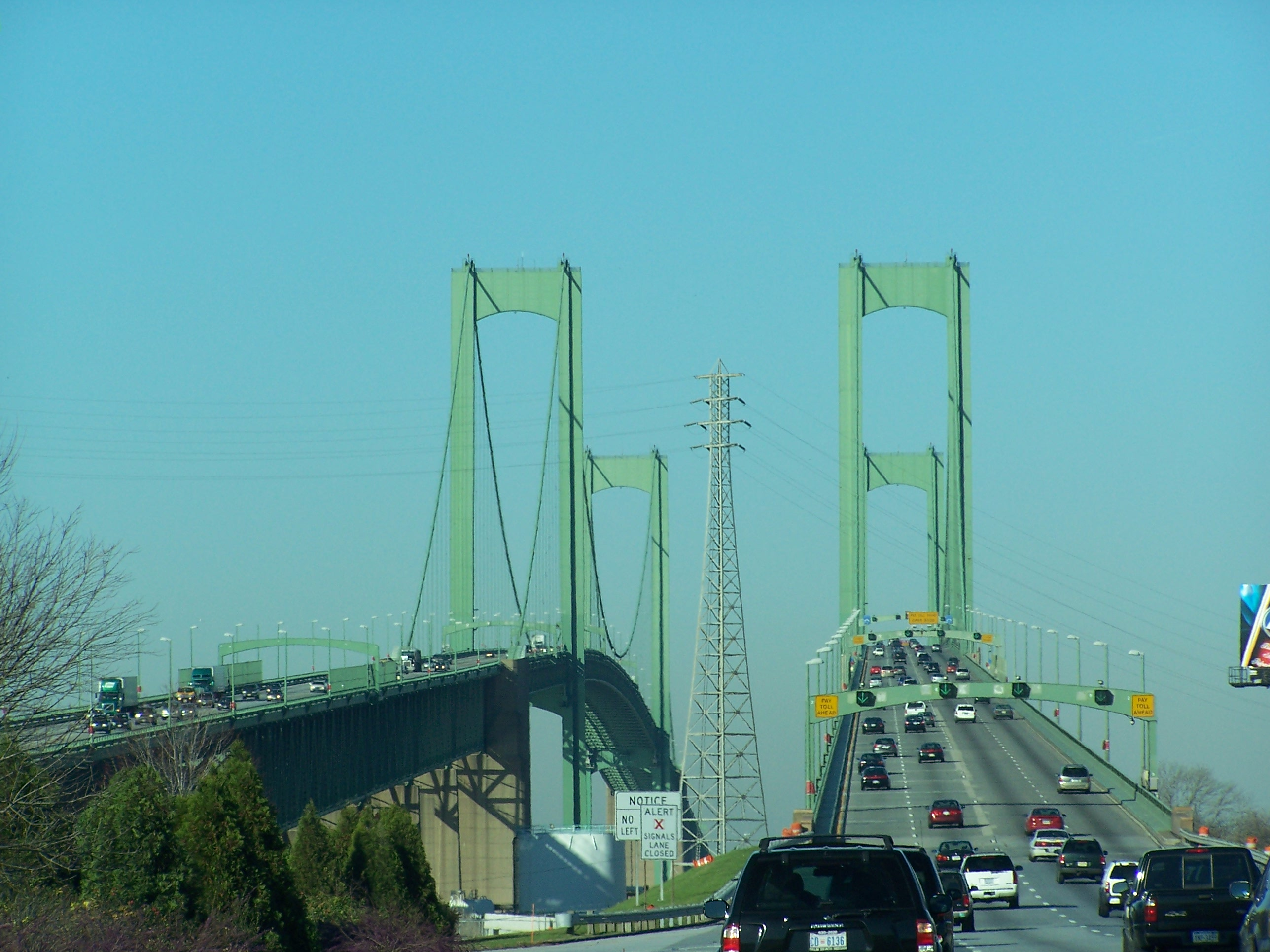
- Looking southbound
- Coordinates: 39.68927°N 75.51897°W
- Carries: 8 lanes of I-295 / US 40
- Crosses: Delaware River
- Locale: New Castle County, Delaware, and Pennsville Township, New Jersey
- Maintained by: Delaware River and Bay Authority
- ID number: 1737
- Website: www.delawarememorialbridge.com

Characteristics
- Design: Suspension bridge with truss spans (main span); Girder and floorbeam system bridge (approach viaducts)
- Material: Steel
- Total length: 10,765 feet (3,281 m) (eastbound); 10,796 feet (3,291 m) (westbound)
- Width: 59.1 feet (18 m) (eastbound); 58.7 feet (18 m) (westbound)
- Longest span: 2,150 feet (655 m)
- Clearance above: 17.9 feet (5 m)
- Clearance below: 174 feet (53 m)

History
- Opened: August 15, 1951; 74 years ago (eastbound); September 12, 1968; 57 years ago (westbound)

Statistics
- Daily traffic: 100,000
- Toll: Cars $6.00 cash, $4.75 for DE and NJ-issued E-ZPass, $5.00 for out-of-state E-ZPass, tractor-trailers $32.00 (Delaware side; westbound only)

Location
- Interactive map of Delaware Memorial Bridge

The Delaware Memorial Bridge is a dual-span suspension bridge crossing the Delaware River. The toll bridges carry Interstate 295 and U.S. Route 40 and is also the link between Delaware and New Jersey. The bridge was designed by the firm of Howard, Needles, Tammen & Bergendoff with consulting help from engineer Othmar Ammann, whose other designs include the George Washington Bridge and the Verrazzano–Narrows Bridge.

The bridges provide a regional connection for long-distance travelers. While not a part of Interstate 95, they connect two parts of the highway: the Delaware Turnpike (Interstate 95 in Delaware) on the south side with the New Jersey Turnpike (later Interstate 95 in New Jersey) on the north. They also connect Interstate 495, U.S. Route 13, and Route 9 in unincorporated New Castle County, Delaware, near New Castle, with U.S. Route 130 in Pennsville Township, New Jersey (at the settlement of Deepwater, New Jersey). The Delaware Memorial and Benjamin Franklin Bridge are the only crossings of the Delaware River with both U.S. Highway and Interstate Highway designations.

The bridges are dedicated to those from both New Jersey and Delaware who died in World War II, the Korean War, the Vietnam War, and the Persian Gulf War. On the Delaware side of the bridge is a War Memorial, visible from the northbound-side lanes. The toll facility is operated by the Delaware River and Bay Authority.

The Delaware Memorial Bridge is the southernmost and the largest fixed vehicular crossing of the Delaware River. It is also the only fixed vehicular crossing between Delaware and New Jersey. However, at Fort Mott, New Jersey, there is a small amount of land on the New Jersey side of the river that is part of the state of Delaware, and thus there are pedestrian crossings in between those states, but not spanning the river. The Cape May–Lewes Ferry provides an alternate route between travelers from New Jersey and the Northeastern states to southern Delaware.

An aerial view of the Delaware Memorial Bridge, Delaware River, and I-295

On clear days, the skyline of Philadelphia is visible in the distance on the left going to New Jersey and on the right leaving New Jersey. Wilmington, Delaware, only a few miles away from the bridge, is also visible. Other landmarks that can be seen from the bridge includes the cooling tower for PSEG's Hope Creek Nuclear Generating Station near Salem, New Jersey, the Delaware City Refinery in Delaware City, Delaware, the Reedy Point Bridge, also in Delaware City, both the St. Georges Bridge and the Senator William V. Roth Jr. Bridge in St. Georges, Delaware, and the Commodore Barry Bridge in Chester, Pennsylvania.

As of 2024, more than 100,000 vehicles cross the twin spans on their combined total of eight lanes daily. The largest single day of traffic had 79,488 private and commercial vehicles cross the bridge one-way on November 29, 2009. The largest single weekend for traffic totals had 211,685 vehicles cross the bridge one-way, August 16–18, 2019.

== History ==
=== The first span ===
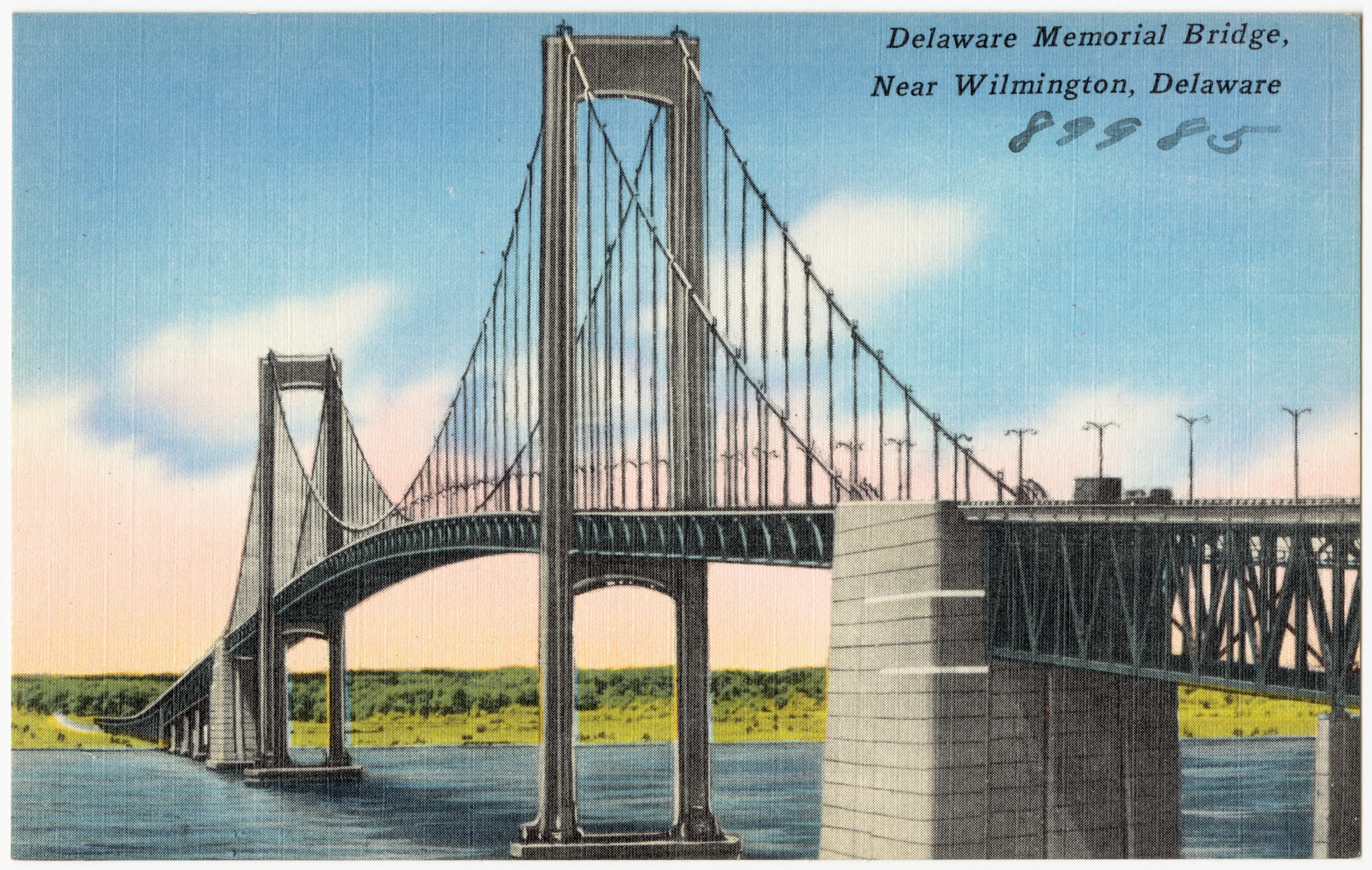
Postcard of the original span prior to the construction of the second

Following the opening of the Benjamin Franklin Bridge in Philadelphia, residents of Delaware and New Jersey began to advocate a crossing of the river in the area of Wilmington, Delaware. As commercial pressures mounted, a ferry service began, as an interim measure, to run in 1926, near the bridge's current location. Advocates of a bridge crossing between Delaware and New Jersey faced strong opposition from the Port of Philadelphia, the Philadelphia Department of Wharves, Docks, and Ferries, and the Delaware River Joint Commission, which claimed that the bridge would be hinder navigation. The U.S. Navy and U.S. Coast Guard were also concerned that the bridge would be vulnerable to an enemy attack. If the bridge were to collapse into the river, it could render the Philadelphia Navy Yard unusable.

As traffic by cars and truck increased rapidly, the benefits of a bridge in this area became evident, and its construction was authorized by the highway departments of Delaware and New Jersey in 1945. Originally, a two-lane highway tunnel was considered, but the costs for a four-lane bridge was found to be equivalent in price, therefore being the reason a four-lane bridge was chosen. Congress approved the bridge project on July 13, 1946, and its construction began on February 1, 1949.

The project cost $44 million, and it took two years to complete the 175 feet (53 m) high span with towers reaching 440 feet (134 m) above water level. The first span opened to traffic on August 16, 1951, and at the time was the sixth-longest main suspension span in the world. The Governor of Delaware, Elbert N. Carvel, and the Governor of New Jersey, Alfred E. Driscoll, dedicated the bridge to each state's war dead from World War II.

The bridge quickly proved a popular travel route when the New Jersey Turnpike connection was completed at its north end. By 1955, nearly eight million vehicles were crossing the bridge each year, nearly twice the original projection. By 1960, the bridge was carrying more than 15 million cars and trucks per year, and this increased even more when the bridge was linked to the new Delaware Turnpike, Interstate 95, in November 1963.

=== The second span ===
Construction of the second span began in mid-1964, 250 feet (76 m) north of the original span. It was completed at a cost of $77 million and opened on September 12, 1968, dedicated to those soldiers from Delaware and New Jersey killed in the Korean War and Vietnam War. The original span was closed down for fifteen months for refurbishment: its suspenders were replaced and its deck and median barrier were removed and replaced with a single deck to allow four undivided lanes of traffic. Finally, on December 29, 1969, all eight lanes of the Delaware Memorial Bridge Twin Span opened to traffic, making it the world's second-longest twin suspension bridge.

While they are similar in basic appearance, major differences exist between the original and second spans. The original was constructed of riveted steel plates, and has an open-grate shoulder access walk. The second span was constructed mostly of welded steel plates (with heavy riveted joints in crucial areas) like with most contemporary steel bridges, and also has concrete access walks.

The original suspension span carries northbound traffic for Interstate 295, the newer southbound. Crossover lanes on each side of the bridge can allow two-way traffic on one span if the other must be closed for an extensive period of time.

=== 1969–present ===
On July 9, 1969, the oil tanker Regent Liverpool struck the fender system protecting the tower piers. The bridge itself was spared damage, but the fender suffered about $1.0 million in damage.

The Delaware River and Bay Authority (DRBA) began a $13 million project in 2003 to resurface the bridge, refurbish the expansion joints, upgrade the electrical system, and replace the elevators in the four towers. This work was completed in 2008.

In 2022 the DRBA began a project to apply ultra-high performance concrete to the driving surface of the eastbound span (i.e., northbound Interstate 295).

The Delaware Memorial Bridge Protection System began in July 2023. The $93 million ship collision protection system project consists of the installation of eight stone-filled dolphins, each measuring 80 feet (24 m) in diameter. Four cells are being installed at the piers supporting both eastern and western towers and will be located a minimum of 443 feet (135 m) from the edge of the Delaware River's 800-foot-wide (240 m) channel. Construction is expected to be completed in September 2025.

== Toll ==
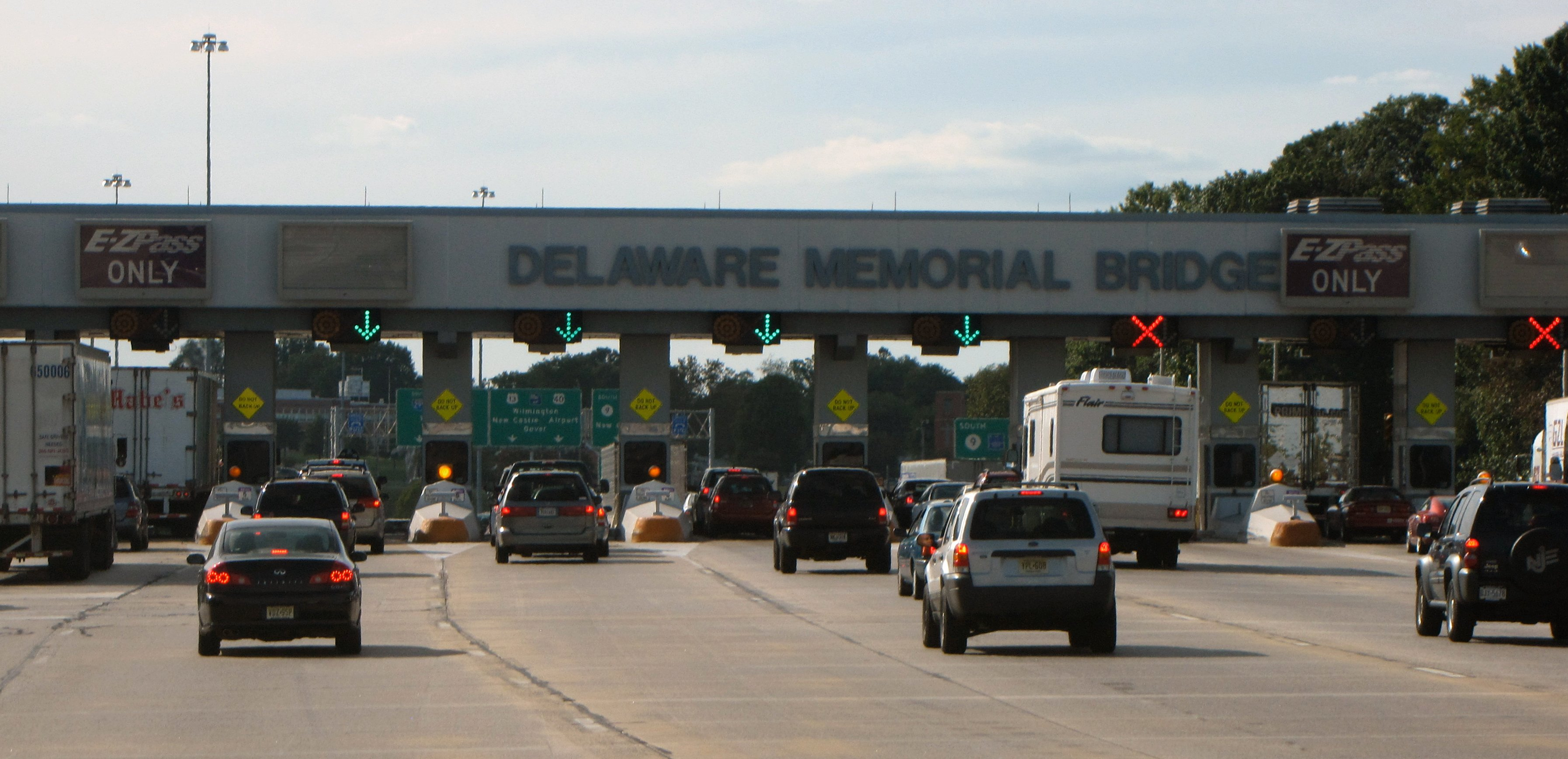
Delaware Memorial Bridge one-way toll plaza

Tolls for crossing are handled in a one-direction only manner for traffic travelling from New Jersey to Delaware (westbound) and were initially 75 cents when the bridge opened in 1951. As of April 1, 2025, the toll is $6.00 for passenger vehicles using cash and $5.00 using an E-ZPass. Frequent Traveler discounts are available to New Jersey E-ZPass account holders, for passenger cars only, via pre-purchase of passages. In 2003, about $270,000 in tolls were collected daily.

Prior to the introduction of E-ZPass, both tokens and frequent traveler tickets were used, with special, discounted ticket books for local residents. They were phased out upon the introduction of the new system, and the tokens are no longer valid.

== Motorist assistance ==
When the bridge opened in 1951, DRBA officials noticed that some motorists expressed fear of crossing the bridge due to gephyrophobia or acrophobia. As a result, the DRBA Police offers an "acrophobia support" service whereby a motorist can call ahead to arrange for an officer to drive them over the bridge. One officer drives the motorist's vehicle while another officer follows in an escort vehicle. The DRBA responds to about 450 escort requests per year, with 60% of calls coming from repeat customers.

== War memorial ==
Since opening of the first bridge in 1951, annual ceremonies are held at the bridge's war memorial on Memorial Day and Veterans Day to honor the sacrifices of American war veterans. The memorial is located in Veterans Memorial Park in New Castle, Delaware, and it features a reflecting pool, a statue of a soldier, and a wall containing the names of 15,000 men and women from Delaware and New Jersey who were killed in World War II, the Korean War, the War in Vietnam, and the Persian Gulf War.

== Facilities ==
The administrative headquarters of DRBA are in the Delaware Memorial Bridge Plaza, on the Delaware side, in New Castle County.

== Gallery ==
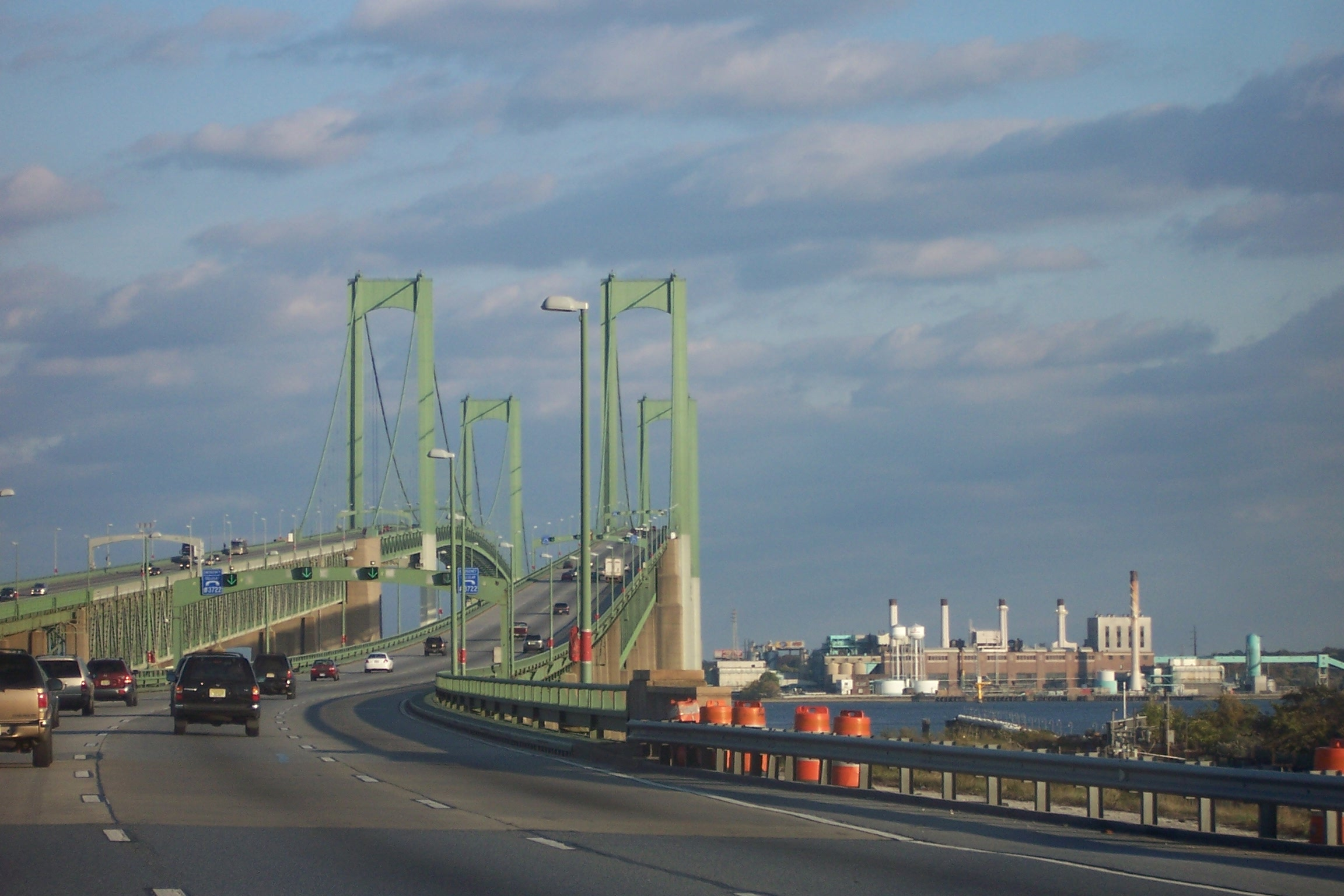
Delaware Memorial Bridge, approaching from the Delaware side, 2005

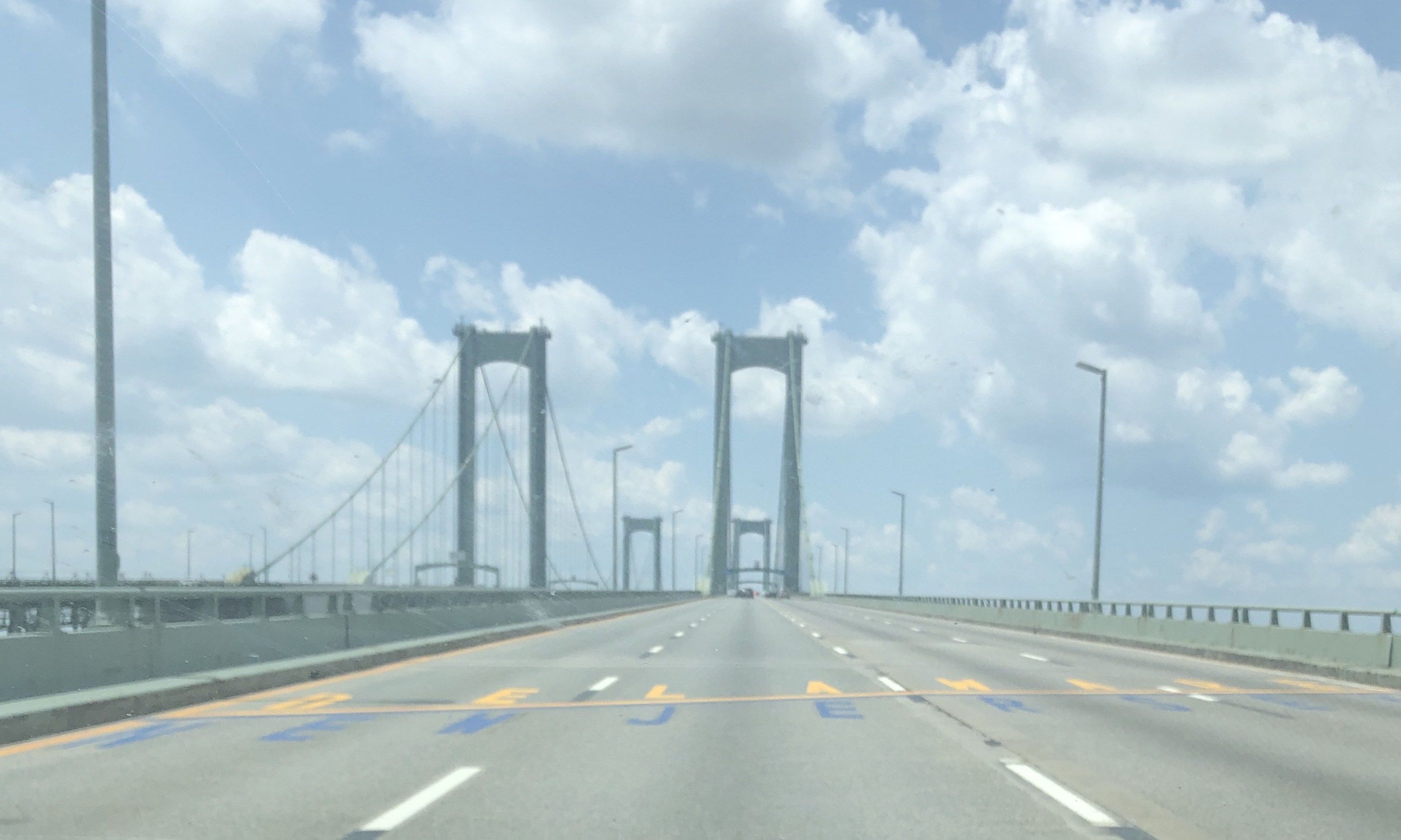
Delaware/New Jersey state line marked on southbound span of Delaware Memorial Bridge

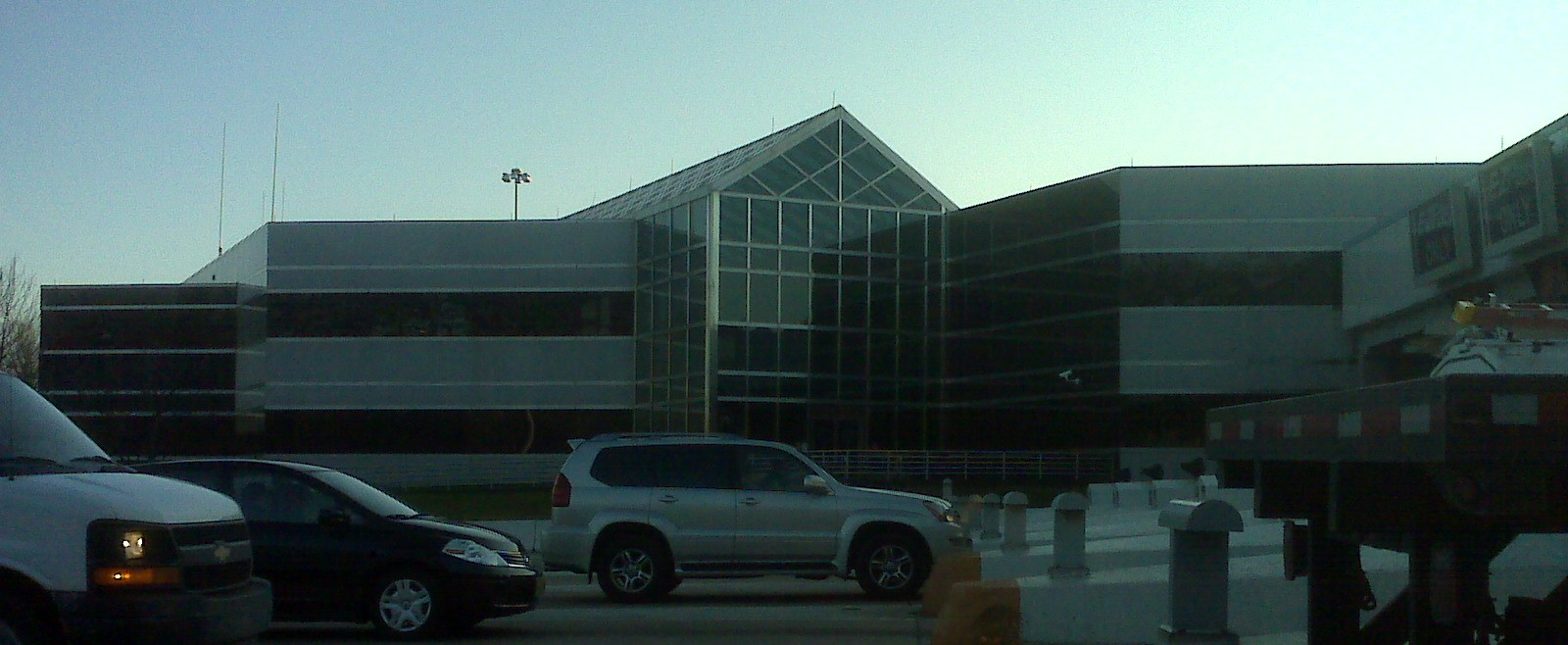
Delaware River and Bay Authority headquarters in the bridge toll plaza

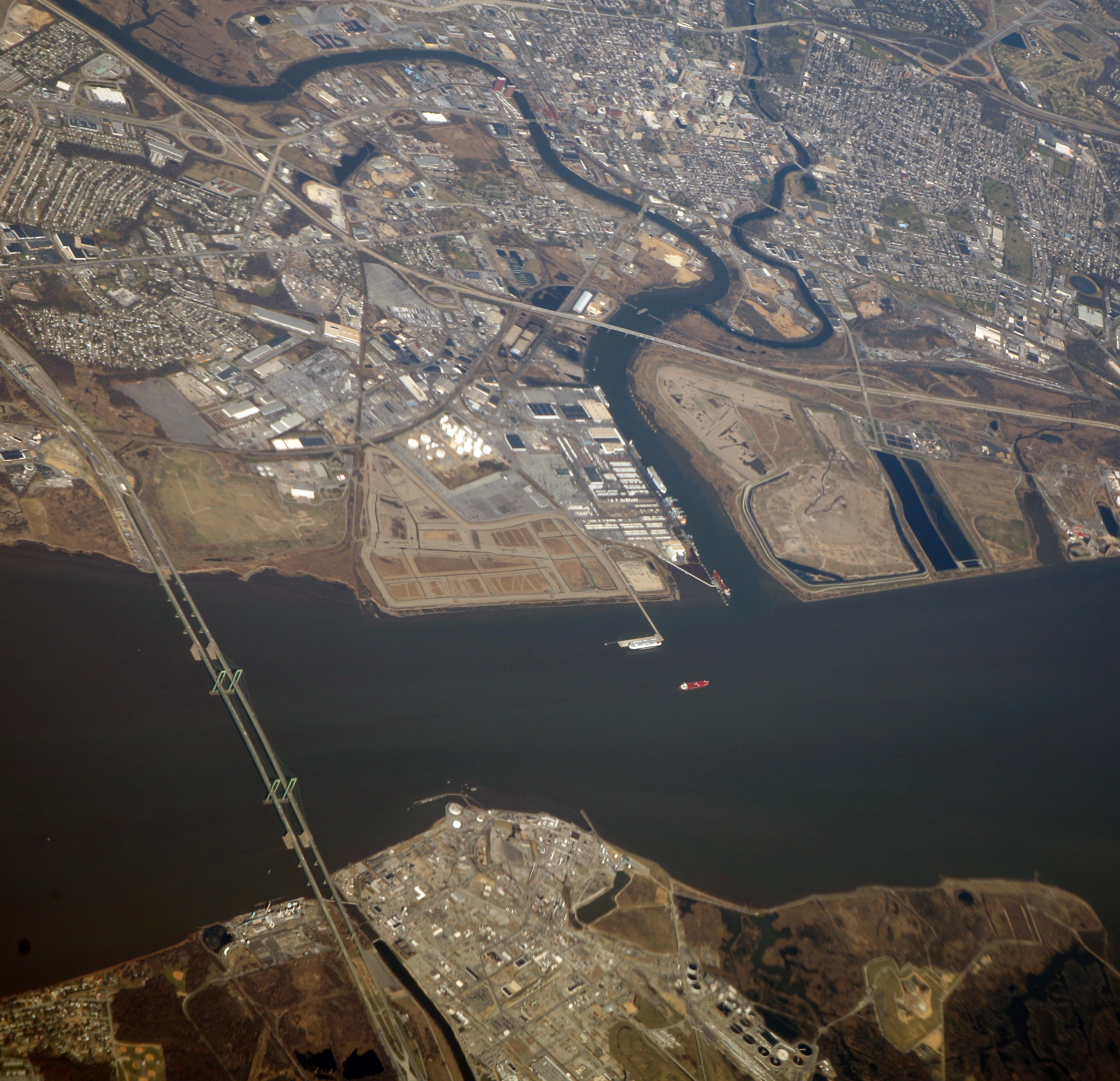
Aerial image of Delaware Memorial Bridge (left), Wilmington, Delaware (top right), 2012

== See also ==
- List of crossings of the Delaware River
- List of longest bridges
- List of bridges in the United States
- List of longest suspension bridge spans
