= Delaware Route 7 =

State highway in New Castle County, Delaware, United States

Delaware Route 7

Route information
- Maintained by DelDOT
- Length: 16.87 mi (27.15 km)
- Existed: 1936–present
- Tourist routes: Washington–Rochambeau Revolutionary Route

Major junctions
- South end: US 13 / DE 72 in Wrangle Hill
- DE 71 in Red Lion; US 40 in Bear; DE 273 near Christiana; DE 1 in Christiana; I-95 in Christiana; DE 58 in Christiana; DE 4 in Christiana and Stanton; DE 2 in Marshallton; DE 72 in Pike Creek
- North end: SR 3013 at Pennsylvania state line near Hockessin

Location
- Country: United States
- State: Delaware
- Counties: New Castle

Highway system
- Delaware State Route System; List; Byways
← DE 6	→ DE 8

Delaware Route 7 (DE 7) is a north–south highway in New Castle County, Delaware that connects U.S. Route 13 (US 13) and DE 72 in Wrangle Hill north to the Pennsylvania border near Hockessin, where the road continues into Pennsylvania as State Route 3013 (SR 3013), intersecting Pennsylvania Route 41 (PA 41) at an interchange. Between Wrangle Hill and Christiana, DE 7 runs parallel to the west of the DE 1 freeway through suburban areas, passing through Bear. DE 7 joins DE 1 next to the Christiana Mall and comes to an interchange with Interstate 95 (I-95), where DE 1 reaches its northern terminus, before the freeway ends at the DE 58 interchange. After the freeway segment, DE 7 continues north as an at-grade road concurrent with DE 4 through Stanton. From Stanton to the Pennsylvania border, DE 7 heads northwest through suburban areas, passing through Pike Creek.

What is now DE 7 was built as a state highway during the 1920s and 1930s. By 1936, the route was designated to run along its present alignment between US 13 near Red Lion and the Pennsylvania border. From the 1950s to the 1970s, DE 7 became a divided highway between Christiana and Milltown Road. With the construction of the DE 1 freeway in the 1990s, DE 7 was shifted to a portion of the freeway near the Christiana Mall. The route was also extended south to an intersection with US 13 and DE 72 as a result of the relocation of US 13 onto a portion of the freeway. The road also became a divided highway between Milltown Road and DE 72 in the 1990s. In 1999, an interchange was built at DE 58 as a result of a northward extension of the freeway along DE 7. The interchange with I-95 was reconstructed to include flyover ramps in 2013.

== Route description ==
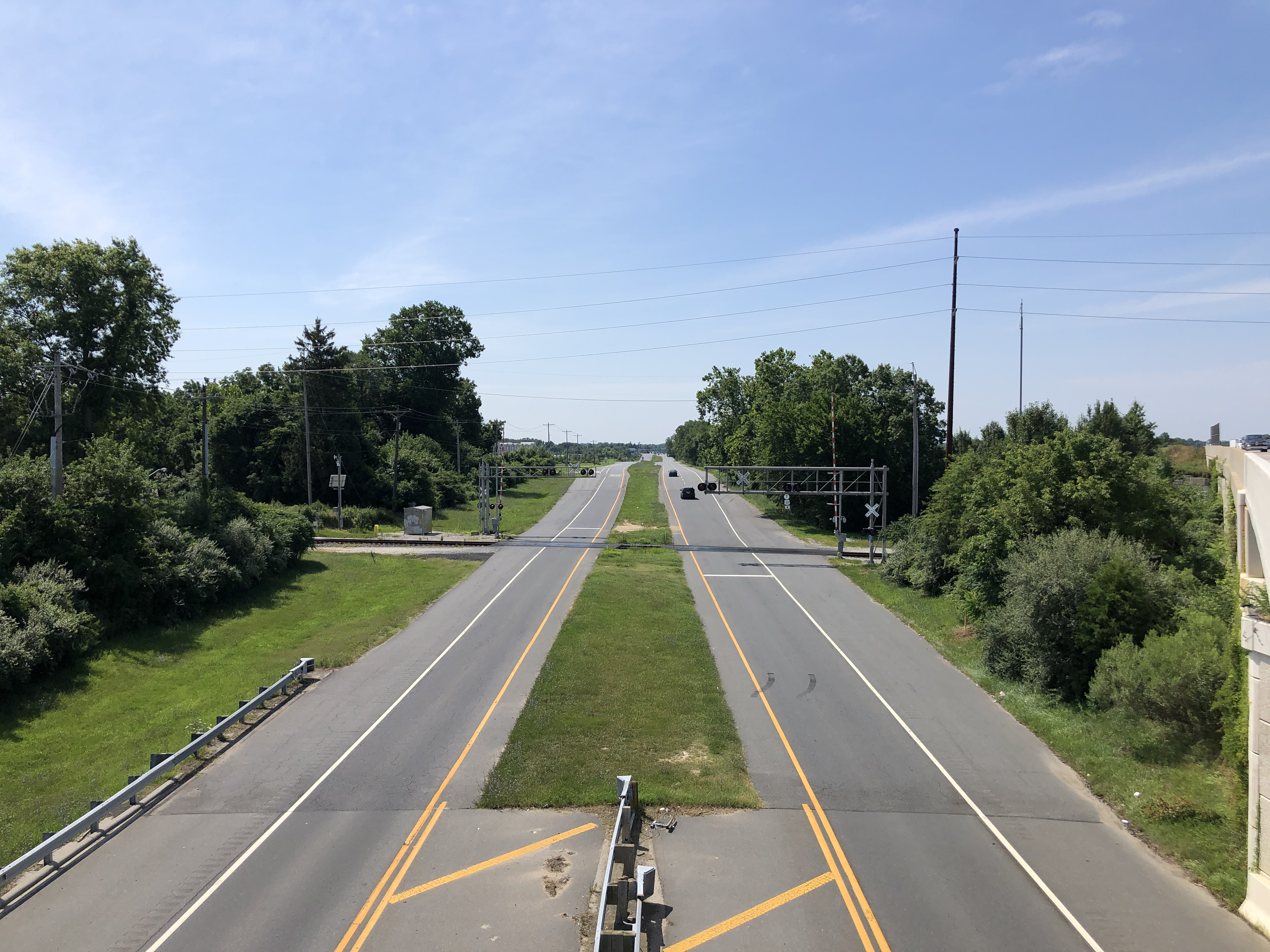
DE 7 southbound in Corbit

DE 7 begins at an intersection with US 13 and DE 72 in the community of Wrangle Hill to the west of the city of Delaware City, where the road continues south as part of US 13. From the southern terminus, the route heads north on four-lane divided South Dupont Highway. The road runs between farmland to the west and warehouses to the east, narrowing to two lanes and crossing Norfolk Southern's Reybold Industrial Track railroad line at-grade before passing under the US 13/DE 1 freeway without an interchange. After this, DE 7 becomes an undivided road called Bear-Corbitt Road, with Old South Dupont Highway branching off to the northeast. The route continues north through woodland and homes, crossing Red Lion Creek before reaching an intersection with DE 71 in Red Lion. The road crosses Norfolk Southern's New Castle Secondary railroad line at-grade and heads into Bear. Here, DE 7 widens into a four-lane divided highway as it enters commercial areas and intersects US 40.

After this intersection, the route becomes Bear-Christiana Road and passes through suburban residential development with some farm fields. Farther north, DE 7 narrows into a two-lane undivided road. The highway comes to an intersection with DE 273, where it is briefly a four-lane divided highway. A park and ride lot is located at the northeast corner of this intersection. Following this, DE 7 becomes East Main Street and narrows into a two-lane undivided road, heading through woods and curving to the northwest as it crosses the Christina River. The route enters Christiana and passes homes, intersecting Old Baltimore Pike. At this point, DE 7 turns north onto North Old Baltimore Pike, with the name changing to Stanton-Christiana Road. The route turns east onto four-lane divided Road A and comes to a partial cloverleaf interchange with the DE 1 freeway and Mall Road southwest of the Christiana Mall, a super-regional shopping mall that is the largest in Delaware, and adjacent retail development.

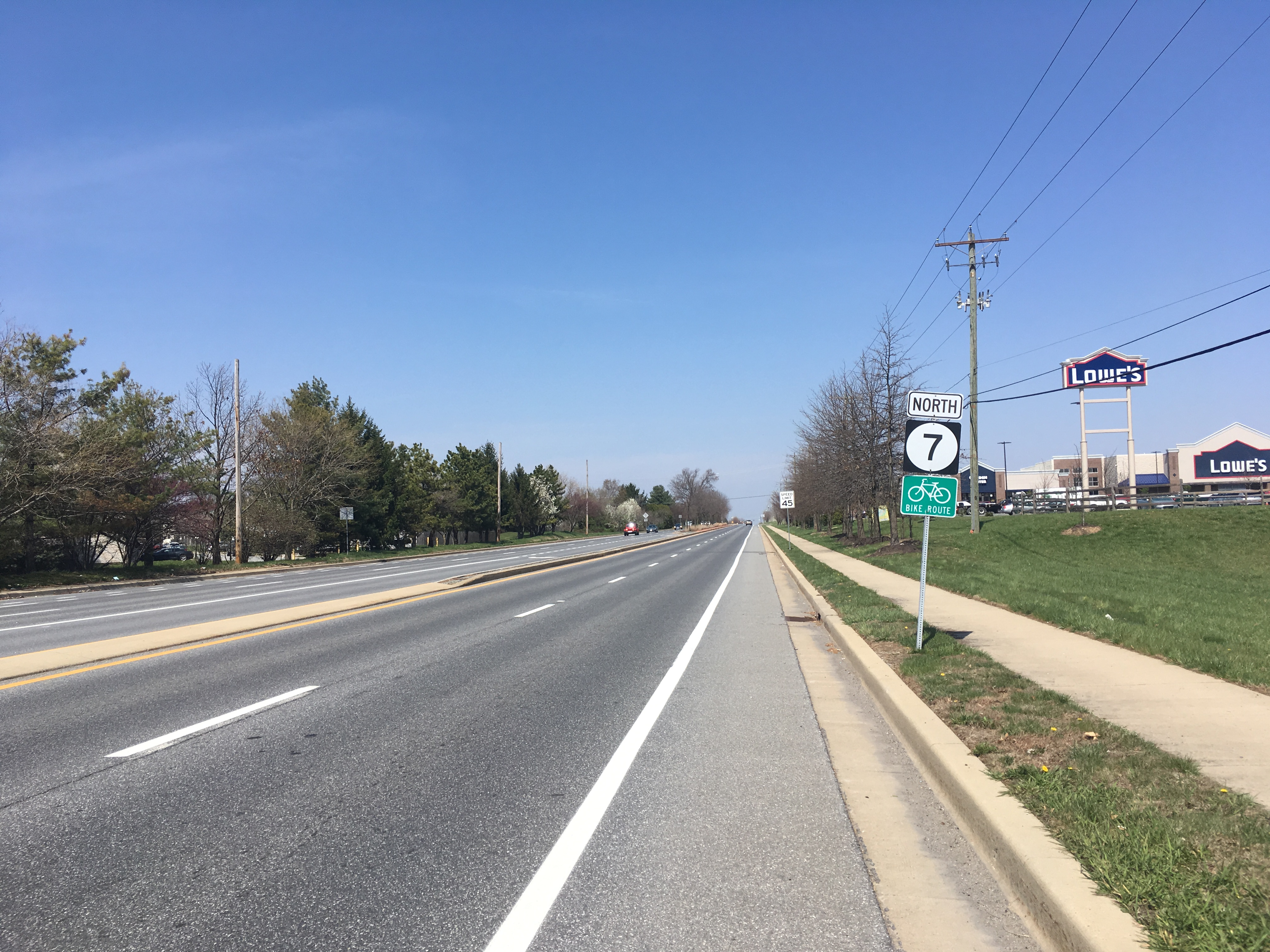
DE 7 northbound in Bear

At this point, DE 7 heads north concurrent with DE 1 on a four-lane freeway. The freeway comes to a southbound exit and northbound entrance with Mall Road that serves the Christiana Mall to the east. DE 1/DE 7 continues to a modified cloverleaf interchange with I-95 (Delaware Turnpike), where DE 1 reaches its northern terminus. The I-95 interchange has flyover ramps from northbound DE 1 to northbound I-95 and from southbound I-95 to southbound DE 1 that includes a ramp to DE 7 from the southbound flyover ramp; the flyover ramps split from DE 1 south of the DE 7 interchange. The road heads through more commercial areas and comes to a partial cloverleaf interchange with DE 58, at which point the freeway segment ends; the DE 58 interchange uses the exit numbers from DE 1. In the southbound direction, a collector/distributor road serves both DE 58 (intersecting that road at-grade) and I-95. Past DE 58, DE 7 continues north at-grade as six-lane divided Stanton-Christiana Road, heading to the west of the Stanton Campus of Delaware Technical Community College before intersecting DE 4. At this point DE 4 turns north for a concurrency with DE 7, running through wooded areas with nearby development, including the Hale-Byrnes House, and passing over Amtrak's Northeast Corridor railroad line and the White Clay Creek and Mill Creek near their confluence. The road heads to the east of Delaware Park, which consists of a Thoroughbred horse racetrack, casino, and golf course. Access to Delaware Park is provided by Delaware Park Boulevard. From here, the roadway curves northeast to enter Stanton. At this point, the two routes continue into a commercial area and split into the one-way pair of Mitch Road eastbound and Main Street westbound.

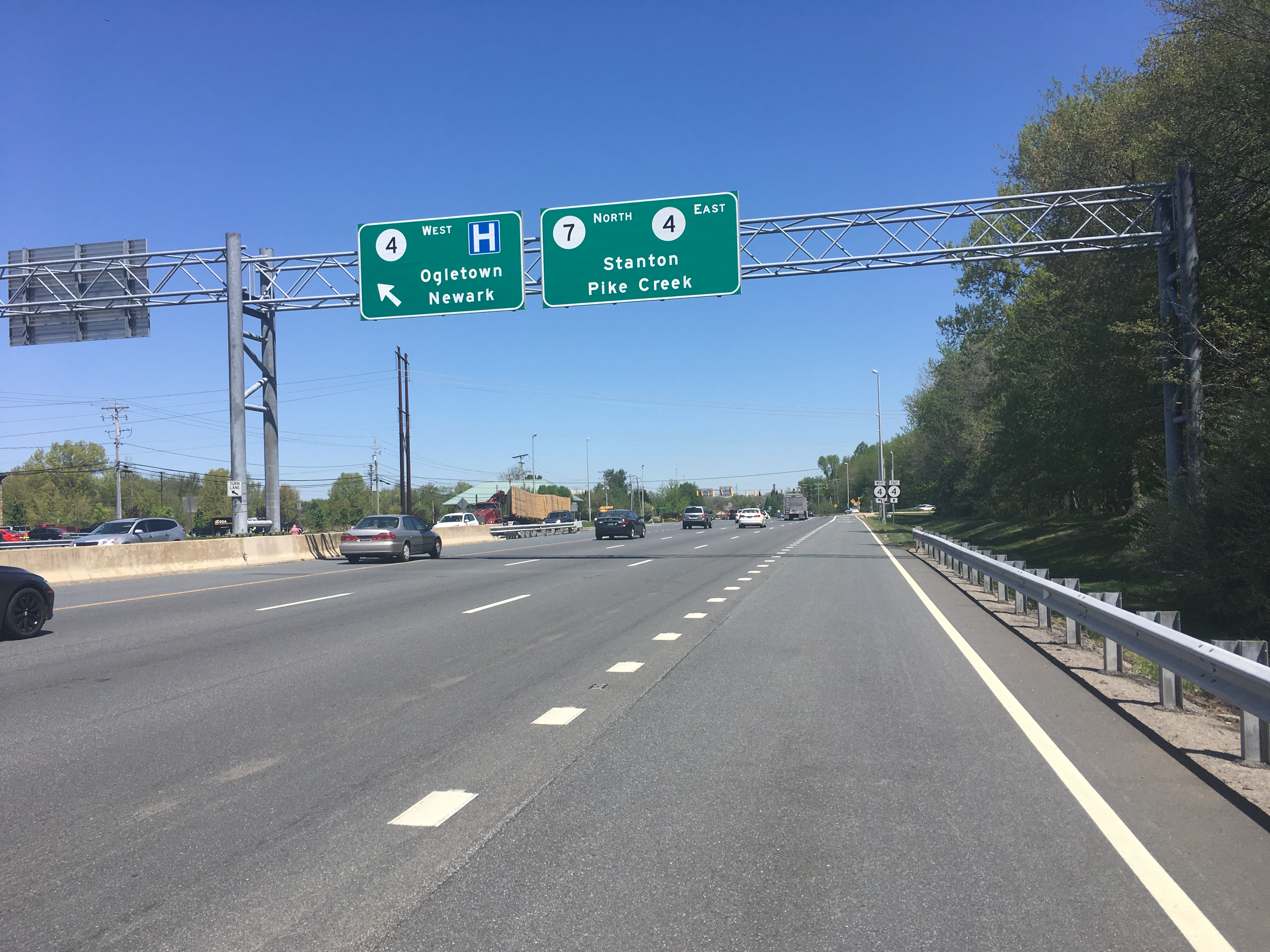
DE 7 northbound at DE 4 in Christiana

DE 7 splits from DE 4 by heading northwest on four-lane divided Limestone Road. The road runs through suburban residential neighborhoods, coming to a bridge over CSX's Philadelphia Subdivision railroad line. The route continues into business areas and reaches an intersection with DE 2 in Marshallton. Past this junction, DE 7 heads into residential and commercial areas and turns into a four-lane undivided road. The route becomes a divided highway again as it comes to the Milltown Road intersection in the community of Milltown, with a northbound ramp providing access to eastbound Milltown Road and McKennans Church Road. Following this intersection, DE 7 enters the Pike Creek area. The road curves west, crossing Mill Creek and passing to the north of Carousel Park, before turning northwest again and running to the southwest of Goldey–Beacom College, a private non-profit college. DE 7 curves to the north and comes to an intersection with the northern terminus of DE 72.

Following this, the road continues through suburban development. At the junction with Little Baltimore Road/Brackenville Road, the route curves to the northwest and narrows to a three-lane undivided road with one northbound lane and two southbound lanes, heading into the Hockessin area. DE 7 turns into a two-lane divided highway as it passes southwest of the Lantana Square shopping center, where a park and pool lot is located, and intersects Valley Road. Past this, the route becomes a two-lane undivided road that runs through fields and residential areas, briefly gaining a northbound truck lane as it climbs a hill. DE 7 reaches its northern terminus at the Pennsylvania border, where Limestone Road continues north into that state as SR 3013, an unsigned quadrant route that heads to an interchange with PA 41.

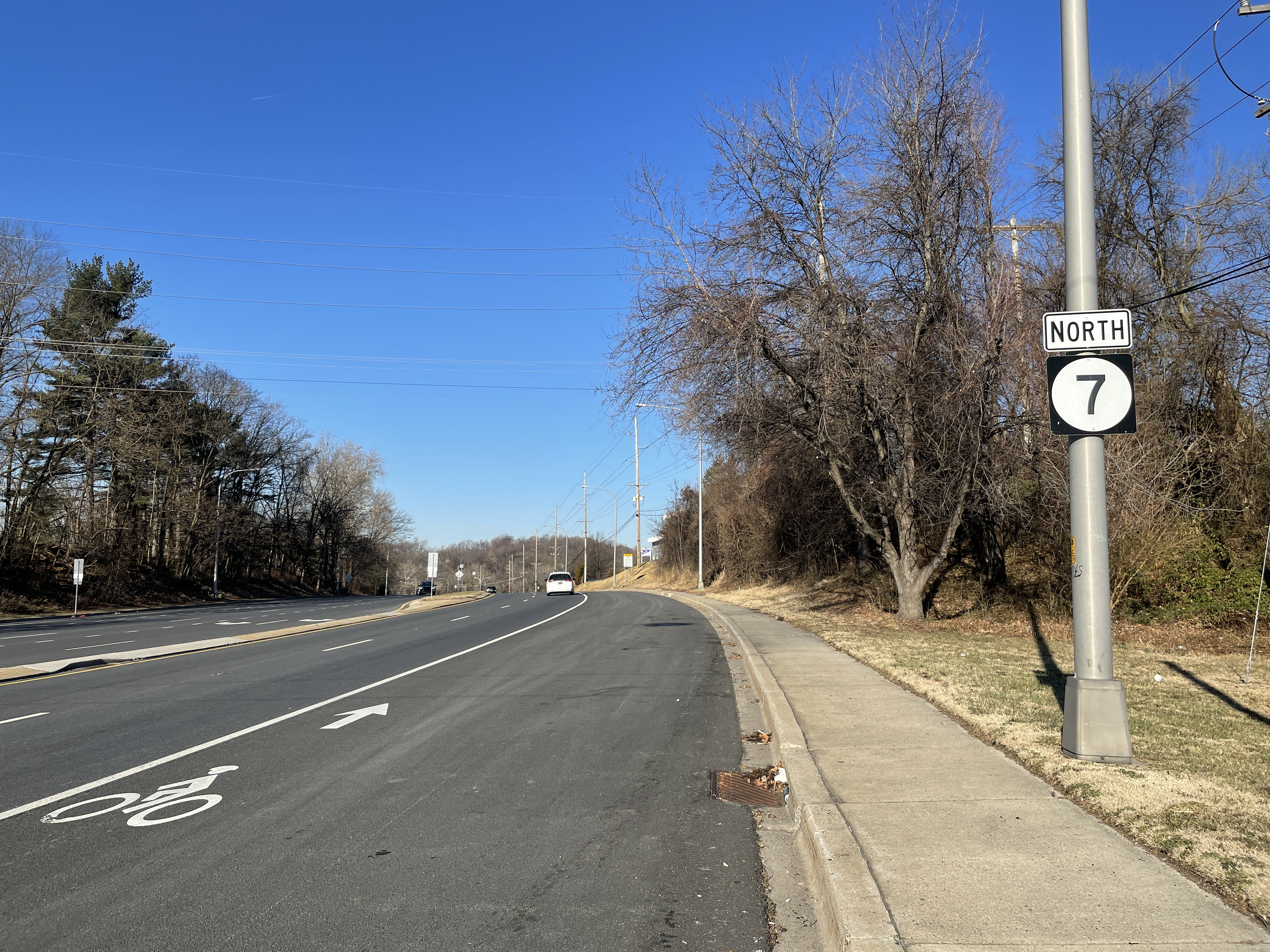
DE 7 northbound past Milltown Road in Milltown

The section of DE 7 between Old Baltimore Pike in Christiana and DE 4 in Stanton is part of the Washington–Rochambeau Revolutionary Route, a National Historic Trail. DE 7 has an annual average daily traffic count ranging from a high of 95,797 vehicles at the south end of the DE 4 concurrency to a low of 3,294 vehicles at the Old Baltimore Pike intersection. The portion of DE 7 from the south end of the DE 1 concurrency north to the Pennsylvania border is part of the National Highway System.

== History ==
What would become DE 7 originally existed as a county road by 1920. By 1924, the road was paved between Christiana and Stanton and was upgraded to a state highway between Capitol Trail and New Linden Hill Road. A year later, the road was upgraded to a state highway between Bear and Christiana and between Paper Mill Road and Brackenville Road, with all the sections south of Bear, between New Linden Hill Road and Paper Mill Road and Brackenville Road and the Pennsylvania border proposed as a state highway. By 1931, these sections of state highway had been completed. DE 7 was designated to run from US 13 south of Red Lion north to the Pennsylvania border by 1936, following its present alignment. In 1937, the narrow swing bridge over the Christina River in Christiana was replaced with a stone bridge. A concrete tied-arch bridge was built over the White Clay Creek in Stanton in 1941. By 1959, DE 7 was widened into a divided highway between Stanton and DE 2. The divided highway was extended north to Milltown Road by 1966. By 1985, DE 273 was realigned to bypass Christiana, removing it from a portion of DE 7 through the town. Also at this time, the route was widened into a divided highway from the Christiana Mall north to Stanton. The route was shifted west to a new alignment passing over the Amtrak tracks and the White Clay Creek.

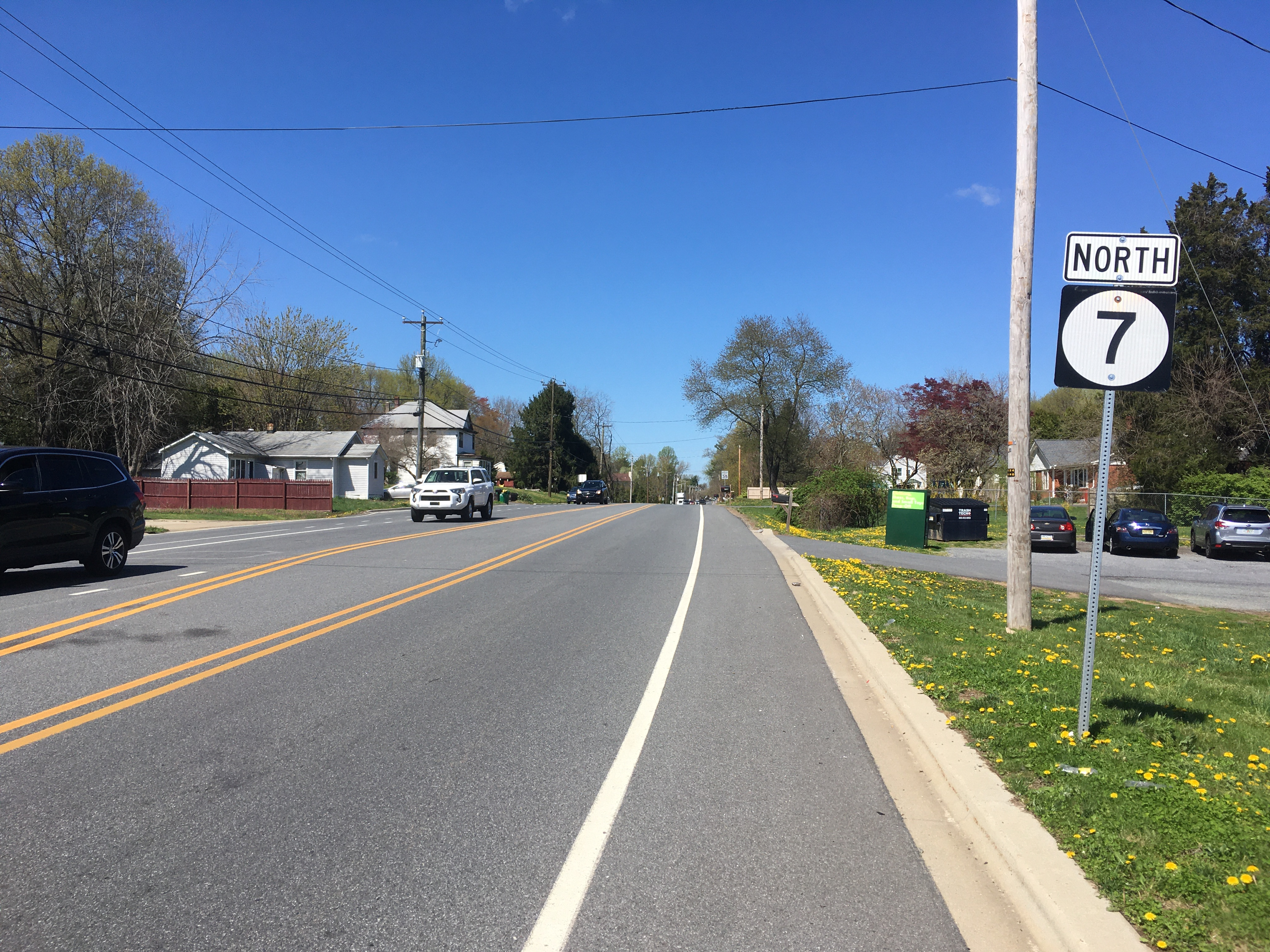
DE 7 northbound past DE 71 in Red Lion

In the 1980s, a freeway relief route for DE 7 was proposed to run between US 13 in Tybouts Corner and I-95 in Christiana in order to reduce congestion along DE 7. In 1988, this relief route became part of DE 1, a freeway connecting the Wilmington area to Dover. The first section of the DE 1 freeway opened in August 1991 between US 13 in Tybouts Corner and US 40 in Bear. Three months later, the freeway opened north to DE 273 in Christiana. The section of DE 1 between DE 273 and I-95 in Christiana opened in April 1993. As a result, DE 7 was relocated onto the DE 1 freeway for a short distance near the Christiana Mall. The DE 1 freeway was extended from US 13 in Tybouts Corner to St. Georges in December 1995, in which it incorporated a portion of the existing US 13 near Red Lion. US 13 was moved to the new freeway between DE 72 and Tybouts Corner, and DE 7 was extended south along the former alignment of US 13 to end at US 13 and DE 72 in Wrangle Hill. The divided highway portion of DE 7 along Limestone Road was extended north from Milltown Road to DE 72 by 1999. DE 7 from I-95 to north of DE 58 became an extension of the freeway in 1999 with an interchange built at DE 58 in a $25 million construction project.

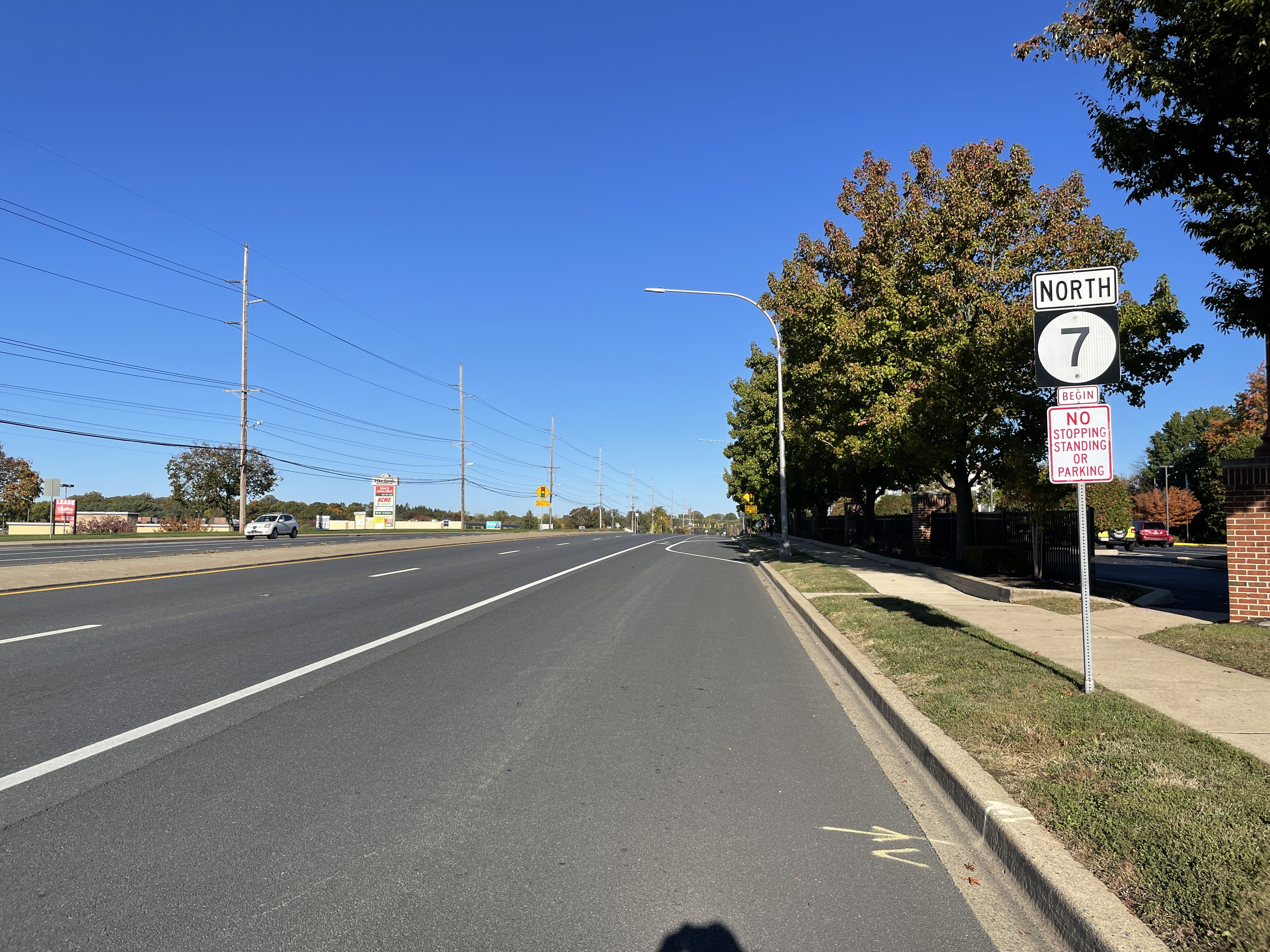
DE 7 northbound in Pike Creek

The Delaware Department of Transportation (DelDOT) reconstructed the cloverleaf interchange at I-95 to include flyover ramps between southbound I-95 and southbound DE 1 and northbound DE 1 and northbound I-95, aiming to reduce merging and congestion at the interchange. Construction began in 2011 with work to replace the bridge over DE 1/DE 7 leading to the Christiana Mall in order to allow room for the flyover ramps; this bridge was completed in March 2012. The ramp from southbound I-95 to southbound DE 1 opened on August 27, 2013 and the ramp from northbound DE 1 to northbound I-95 opened on October 17, 2013, with a ribbon-cutting ceremony attended by Governor Jack Markell and DelDOT secretary Shailen Bhatt. A project widening DE 7 to four lanes between Newtown Drive in Bear and DE 273 in Christiana was completed in early 2014.

DelDOT is planning to widen DE 1 and part of this involves reconstructing its interchange with DE 273. One version of the plan involves moving DE 7 onto DE 1 from DE 273 northward and disconnecting East Main Street from the DE 273 interchange. New ramps would connect the southbound lanes of DE 1 directly to DE 7 where East Main Street once did, and the park and ride lot north of DE 273 would be removed. Local opposition to this project is strong as the nearby Christina River frequently floods and some local residents would not be able to evacuate. Also the Christiana Fire House is located in the center of Christiana and would not be able to continue directly onto DE 7 south, thus adding about 1 mile (1.6 km) and sending trucks onto a frequently congested DE 273 east to reach DE 7 south. This was later revised to have the ramps to and from the southbound lanes of DE 1 merge with DE 7 using a roundabout located at the present entrance to the park and ride lot. A public workshop for the widening project was held on October 27, 2021, with the preferred alternative reconstructing the interchange between DE 1 and DE 273 into a single-point urban interchange and keeping DE 7 along its current alignment.

== Major intersections ==
The entire route is in New Castle County.

Location	mi	km	Exit	Destinations	Notes
Wrangle Hill	0.00	0.00		US 13 / DE 72 (South Dupont Highway/Wrangle Hill Road) to DE 1 – St. Georges, Delaware City, Newark	Southern terminus
Red Lion	2.05	3.30		DE 71 (Red Lion Road) to US 13	
Bear	3.75	6.04		US 40 (Pulaski Highway) – Newark, Elkton, Baltimore	
Christiana	5.67	9.12		DE 273 (Christiana Road) to DE 1 / US 13 – Newark, New Castle, Dover	
Christiana	7.14	11.49		DE 1 south (Korean War Veterans Memorial Highway south) – Dover, Beaches	DE 1 north exit 164, Korean War Veterans Memorial Hwy. south exit 164B
Christiana	7.14	11.49	South end of freeway section Exit numbers based on DE 1 kilometer posts		
Christiana	7.88	12.68	165	I-95 – Wilmington, Philadelphia, Newark, Baltimore	Split into exits 165B (north) and 165A (south) northbound; southbound access via exit 166; I-95 exit 4A
Christiana	8.27	13.31	166	DE 58 (Churchmans Road) to I-95 – Churchmans Crossing	Southbound entrance ramp provides access to I-95 (exits 165A-B); I-95 exit 4B; access to Christiana Hospital
Christiana				AAA Boulevard	North end of freeway section
Christiana	8.81	14.18		Northern terminus of Korean War Veterans Memorial Highway	
Christiana	8.81	14.18		DE 4 west (Ogletown Stanton Road) – Ogletown, Newark	South end of DE 4 overlap; access to Christiana Hospital
Stanton				DE 4 east (Mitch Road) – Stanton, Wilmington	One-way street, outbound access only
Stanton	10.01	16.11		DE 4 (Main Street)	One-way street, inbound access only; north end of DE 4 overlap
Marshallton	10.94	17.61		DE 2 (Kirkwood Highway) – Newark, Elsmere, Wilmington	
Pike Creek	14.12	22.72		DE 72 south (Paper Mill Road) – Newark	Northern terminus of DE 72
Twelve-Mile Circle	16.87	27.15		Delaware–Pennsylvania line	
Twelve-Mile Circle	16.87	27.15		SR 3013 north (Limestone Road north) to PA 41 – Avondale	Continuation into Pennsylvania
1.000 mi = 1.609 km; 1.000 km = 0.621 mi: Concurrency terminus
