= Delaware Route 72 =

State highway in New Castle County, Delaware, United States

Delaware Route 72

Route information
- Maintained by DelDOT
- Length: 17.42 mi (28.03 km)
- Existed: 1942–present

Major junctions
- South end: DE 9 near Delaware City
- US 13 / DE 7 in Wrangle Hill; US 13 / DE 1 in Wrangle Hill; DE 71 in Williamsburg; US 40 east of Glasgow; DE 4 in Newark; DE 2 / DE 273 in Newark; DE 2 near Newark
- North end: DE 7 in Pike Creek

Location
- Country: United States
- State: Delaware
- Counties: New Castle

Highway system
- Delaware State Route System; List; Byways
← DE 71	→ DE 82

Delaware Route 72 (DE 72) is a state highway located in New Castle County, Delaware. The route runs from DE 9 near Delaware City north to DE 7 in Pike Creek. The highway runs through suburban areas of northern New Castle County, passing through the eastern part of Newark. DE 72 intersects U.S. Route 13 (US 13), DE 7, and DE 1 near Delaware City, DE 71 in Williamsburg, US 40 east of Glasgow, and DE 4, DE 2, and DE 273 in Newark. Parts of DE 72 were built as a state highway during the 1930s. By the 1940s, the route was designated from DE 2 in Newark north to DE 7 in Pike Creek along Paper Mill Road. The route was extended south to DE 9 in the 1960s. In 1980, the alignment was shifted to the east through Newark to bypass an at-grade railroad crossing on Chapel Street.

== Route description ==
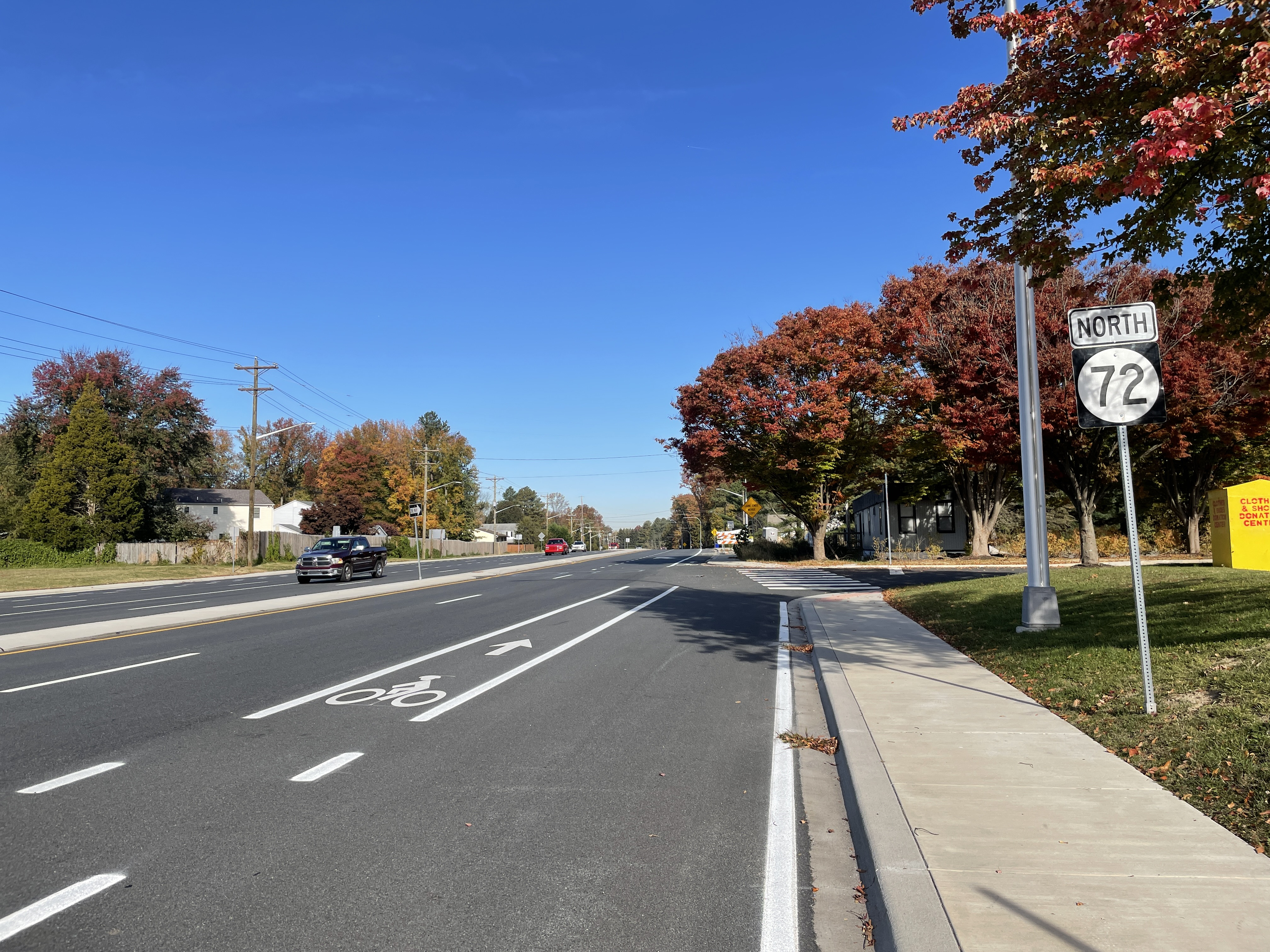
DE 72 northbound past US 40 in Glasgow

DE 72 begins at an intersection with DE 9 adjacent to PBF Energy's Delaware City Refinery west of the city of Delaware City, heading west on two-lane undivided Wrangle Hill Road. The road continues between the oil refinery to the north and farmland to the south before passing south of warehouses and coming to an intersection with US 13 and the southern terminus of DE 7 in Wrangle Hill, where it widens into a four-lane divided highway. At this point, US 13 turns west for a short concurrency with DE 72 to a diverging diamond interchange with the DE 1 freeway, where US 13 splits north onto DE 1.

Past this interchange, DE 72 narrows back into a two-lane undivided road and passes through residential areas, heading to the south of an industrial plant before coming to an intersection with DE 71 in Williamsburg. Following this, the road curves to the northwest through a mix of homes and commercial establishments, crossing the Delmarva Central Railroad's Delmarva Subdivision line at-grade. The route passes northeast of the Caravel Academy before it turns north and comes to an intersection with US 40 in a commercial area to the east of Glasgow.

Past the US 40 intersection, DE 72 continues to the north on Sunset Lake Road, heading into wooded areas with some fields and residential development and crossing Belltown Run before closely running to the west of Norfolk Southern's Delmarva Secondary railroad line, heading across Muddy Run. The route crosses the railroad tracks at-grade to run along east side of the railroad tracks and heads across the Christina River before it widens into a five-lane road with a center left-turn lane as it comes to an intersection with Old Baltimore Pike. At this intersection, the route name changes to South Chapel Street and it passes through fields with some development, crossing under Interstate 95 (Delaware Turnpike) without an interchange. DE 72 enters the eastern part of the city of Newark and passes industrial parks before heading past businesses and residential neighborhoods as it comes to an intersection with DE 4. A park and ride lot is located at the southeast corner of this intersection.

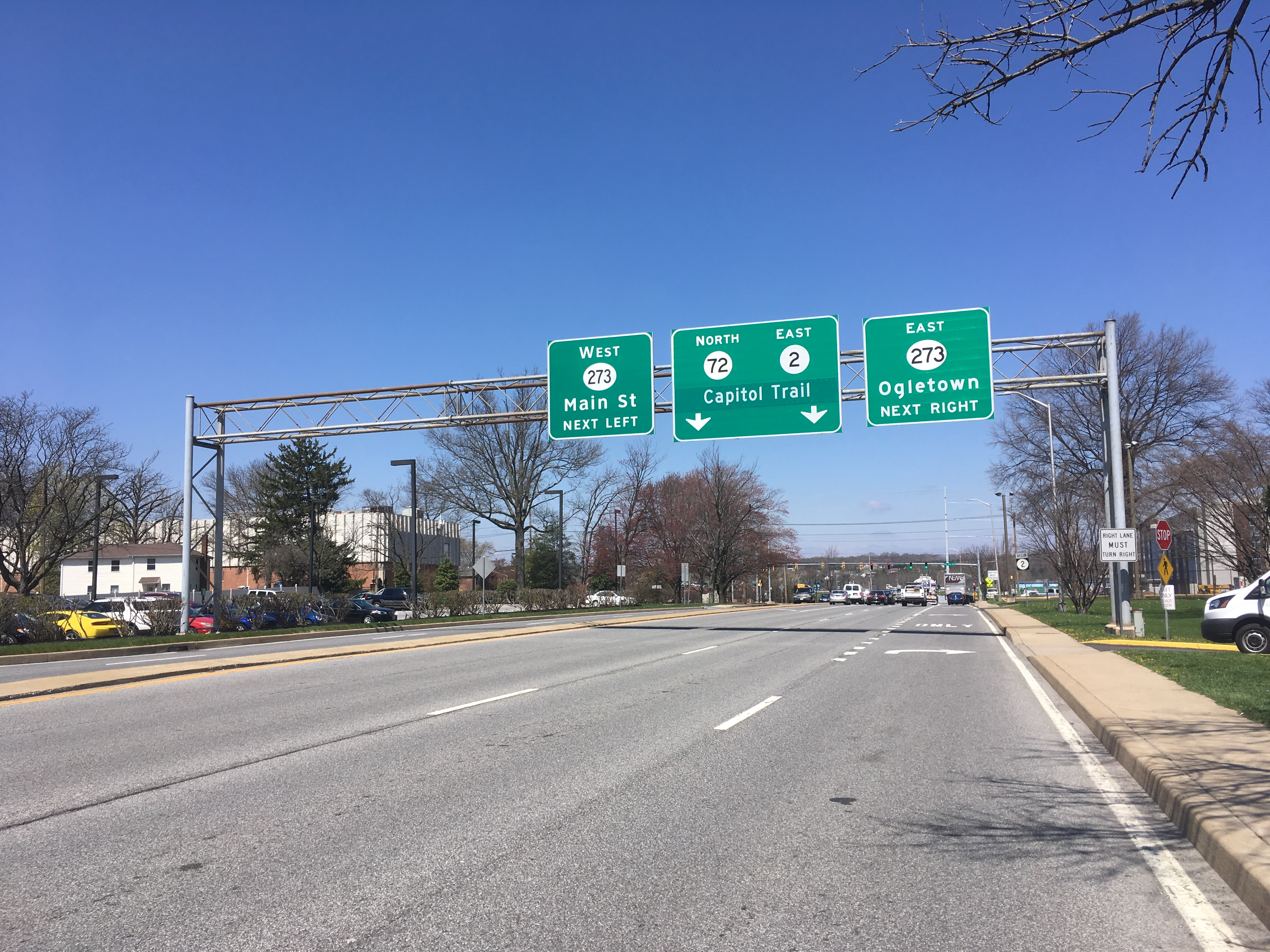
DE 72 northbound at DE 273 and western terminus of DE 2 in Newark

Following this intersection, the road narrows to two lanes as it heads through agricultural areas to the east of the University of Delaware campus. The route continues northeast onto Library Avenue and runs through woods as it comes to a bridge over Amtrak's Northeast Corridor railroad line. The road bends north into commercial areas, passing to the east of Newark High School and widening into a four-lane divided highway as it comes to an intersection with Delaware Avenue, which carries the eastbound direction of DE 273. Here, eastbound DE 273 turns north to join DE 72 and the road reaches an intersection where westbound DE 273 runs west on Main Street and DE 273 continues east as Ogletown Road. Past this intersection, DE 72 becomes concurrent with DE 2 and the name changes to Capitol Trail as it turns northeast and passes under CSX's Philadelphia Subdivision railroad line. The road leaves Newark and heads northeast through residential areas, briefly becoming undivided as it crosses White Clay Creek.

After the road crosses Middle Run, DE 72 splits from DE 2 by heading northwest on two-lane undivided Possum Park Road, crossing the stream again and running through a mix of fields, woods, and housing developments. In Milford Crossroads, the route turns northeast onto Paper Mill Road and curves north to pass between White Clay Creek State Park to the west and the Middle Run Valley Natural Area to the east, crossing Middle Run a third time. The road continues northeast into the suburban Pike Creek area, where it crosses Pike Creek. DE 72 turns east and becomes a four-lane divided highway immediately before it reaches its northern terminus at an intersection with DE 7.

DE 72 has an annual average daily traffic count ranging from a high of 40,800 vehicles at the north end of the DE 2 concurrency to a low of 5,397 vehicles at the US 13 intersection. The portion of DE 72 concurrent with DE 2 is part of the National Highway System.

== History ==
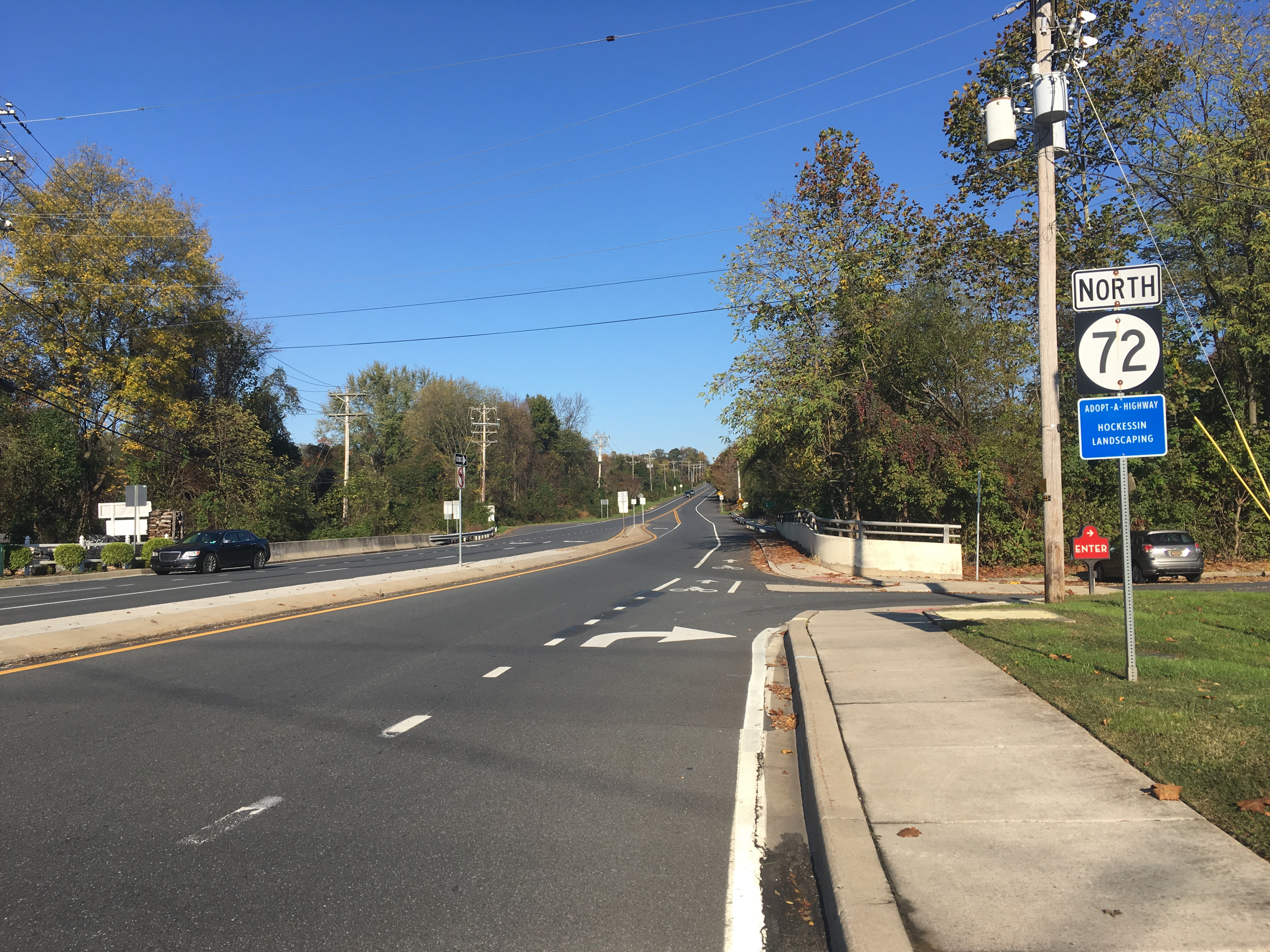
DE 72 northbound past DE 2 near Newark

What is now DE 72 originally existed as a county road by 1920. By 1931, the road was proposed as a state highway between present-day DE 9 and US 13 while what would become DE 72 north of Milford Crossroads was completed as a state highway. The road from present-day DE 9 to US 13 became a state highway a year later. On July 1, 1935, the remaining sections of the present-day route were transferred from the county to the state. The portion of the road between US 13 and US 40 was improved by the state in 1937, providing a better route to Baltimore and Washington, D.C. for residents in the Delaware City, Port Penn, and Odessa areas.

DE 72 was designated by 1942 to run from DE 2 (Main Street) in Newark north to DE 7, following Chapel Street and Paper Mill Road. In 1939, suggestions were made to replace the bridge over the White Clay Creek along Paper Mill Road in Newark. Plans were completed for this bridge by 1942 but construction was postponed due to World War II. The concrete bridge carrying Paper Mill Road over the White Clay Creek was completed in 1947, with final work on the project finished in August 1949. By 1954, Sunset Lake Road was improved from a dirt road to a low-type bituminous road. The roadway between US 40 and Newark was paved by 1966.

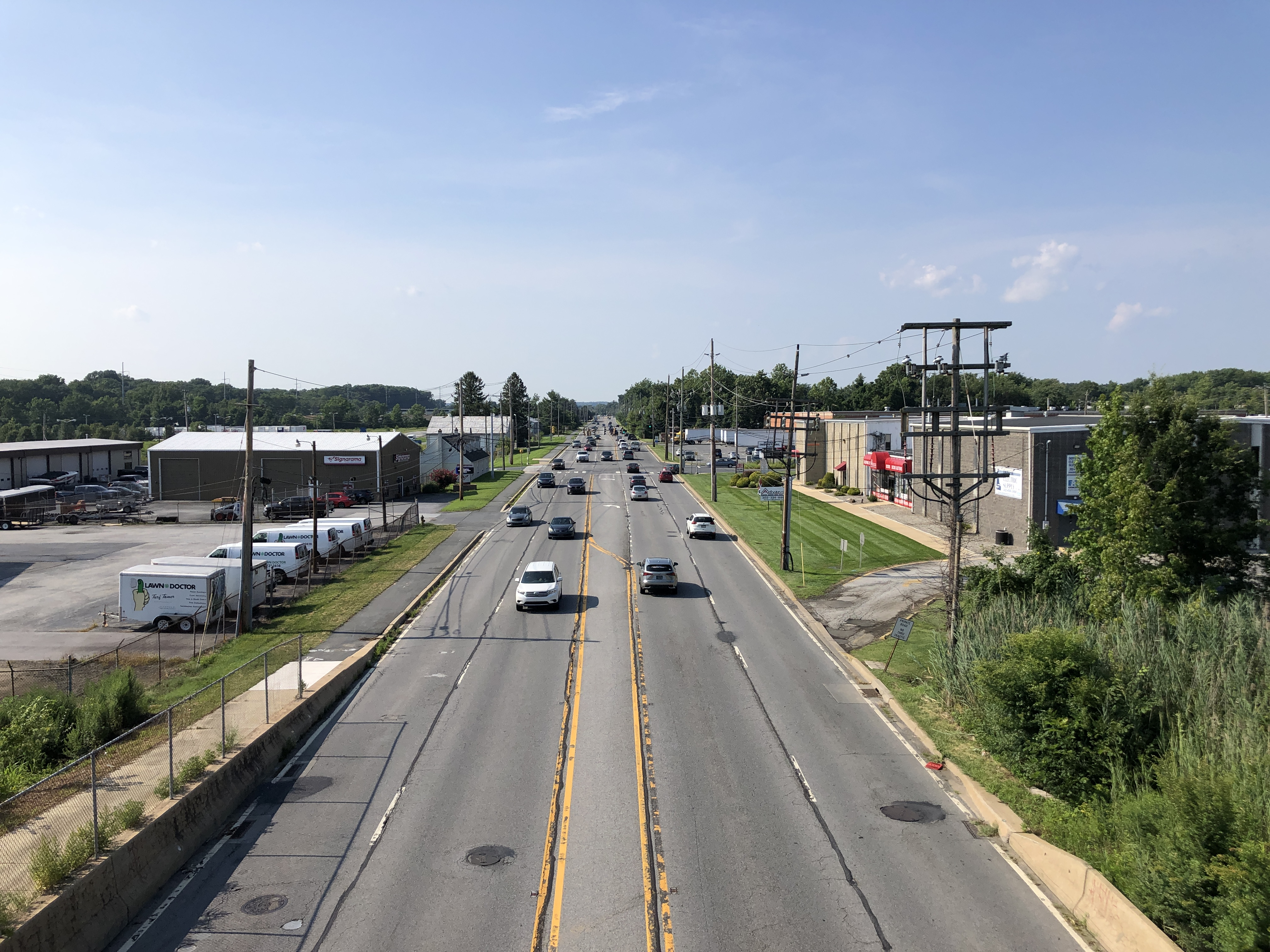
DE 72 northbound at I-95 on the edge of Newark

DE 72 was extended to its present southern terminus at DE 9 the next year, following Chapel Street, Sunset Lake Road, and Wrangle Hill Road. In 1980, the Chapel Street grade crossing of the Northeast Corridor rail line in Newark was removed, and DE 72 was realigned farther to the east to follow Library Avenue across the railroad tracks before continuing north on DE 2 and Possum Park Road to Paper Mill Road in Milford Crossroads. DE 2 was realigned to follow DE 72 around the eastern part of Newark on Library Avenue by 1990. In 2013, the DE 2 concurrency between DE 4 and DE 273 was removed due to the truncation of DE 2 to the DE 273 intersection. On April 29, 2016, Governor Jack Markell, DelDOT secretary Jennifer Cohan, and local officials attended a groundbreaking ceremony for a $7 million project that rebuilt the interchange with DE 1 into a diverging diamond interchange, the first such interchange in Delaware. The diverging diamond interchange configuration was put into place on November 19, 2016.

== Major intersections ==
The entire route is in New Castle County.

Location	mi	km	Destinations	Notes
Delaware City	0.00	0.00	DE 9 (Wrangle Hill Road/River Road) – Delaware City, New Castle	Southern terminus
Wrangle Hill	1.50	2.41	US 13 south / DE 7 north (South Dupont Highway) – St. Georges	South end of US 13 overlap; southern terminus of DE 7
Wrangle Hill	1.72	2.77	US 13 north / DE 1 – Dover, Beaches, Wilmington	DE 1 exit 152; north end of US 13 overlap
Williamsburg	2.98	4.80	DE 71 (Red Lion Road)	
Glasgow	5.35	8.61	US 40 (Pulaski Highway) – Wilmington, Glasgow	
Newark	9.22	14.84	DE 4 to I-95 (Chestnut Hill Road) – Stanton	
Newark	10.72	17.25	DE 273 (Delaware Avenue)	South end of DE 273 eastbound overlap
Newark	10.92	17.57	DE 273 (Main Street/Ogletown Road) – Ogletown DE 2 begins	North end of DE 273 eastbound overlap; south end of DE 2 overlap; western terminus of DE 2
Newark	12.13	19.52	DE 2 east (Capitol Trail) – Wilmington	North end of DE 2 overlap
Pike Creek	17.42	28.03	DE 7 (Limestone Road) – Avondale, Stanton	Northern terminus
1.000 mi = 1.609 km; 1.000 km = 0.621 mi: Concurrency terminus
