= Delaware Route 71 =

State highway in New Castle County, Delaware, United States

Delaware Route 71

Route information
- Maintained by DelDOT and USACE
- Length: 21.99 mi (35.39 km)
- Existed: 1938–present
- Tourist routes: Harriet Tubman Underground Railroad Byway

Major junctions
- South end: US 13 near Townsend
- DE 299 in Middletown; US 301 Toll near Middletown; DE 896 in Mount Pleasant; DE 15 in Summit Bridge; DE 896 near Summit Bridge; DE 72 in Williamsburg; DE 7 in Red Lion
- North end: US 13 / DE 1 in Tybouts Corner

Location
- Country: United States
- State: Delaware
- Counties: New Castle

Highway system
- Delaware State Route System; List; Byways
← DE 62	→ DE 72

Delaware Route 71 (DE 71) is a state highway in New Castle County, Delaware. The route runs from U.S. Route 13 (US 13) south of Townsend north to another intersection with US 13 in Tybouts Corner, traveling to the west of US 13 by way of Townsend, Middletown, and the Summit Bridge. The route runs concurrent with DE 896 from Mount Pleasant to just north of the Summit Bridge.

DE 71 was built as a state highway during the 1920s and 1930s. By 1938, the route was designated to run from US 13 south of Townsend north to US 13 in Tybouts Corner roughly along its present-day alignment. In the 1950s, DE 71 was rerouted to head to the Maryland border southwest of Middletown to connect to Maryland Route 71 (MD 71), with the former route south of Middletown becoming an extended DE 896. Between the 1950s and 1980s, DE 71 was signed with various alignments of US 301 and US 301S. In the 1980s, DE 71 was truncated to DE 896 in Summit Bridge before being extended back along its 1930s alignment to US 13 by the 1990s. The US 301 concurrency between Middletown and Summit Bridge was removed in 2019.

== Route description ==
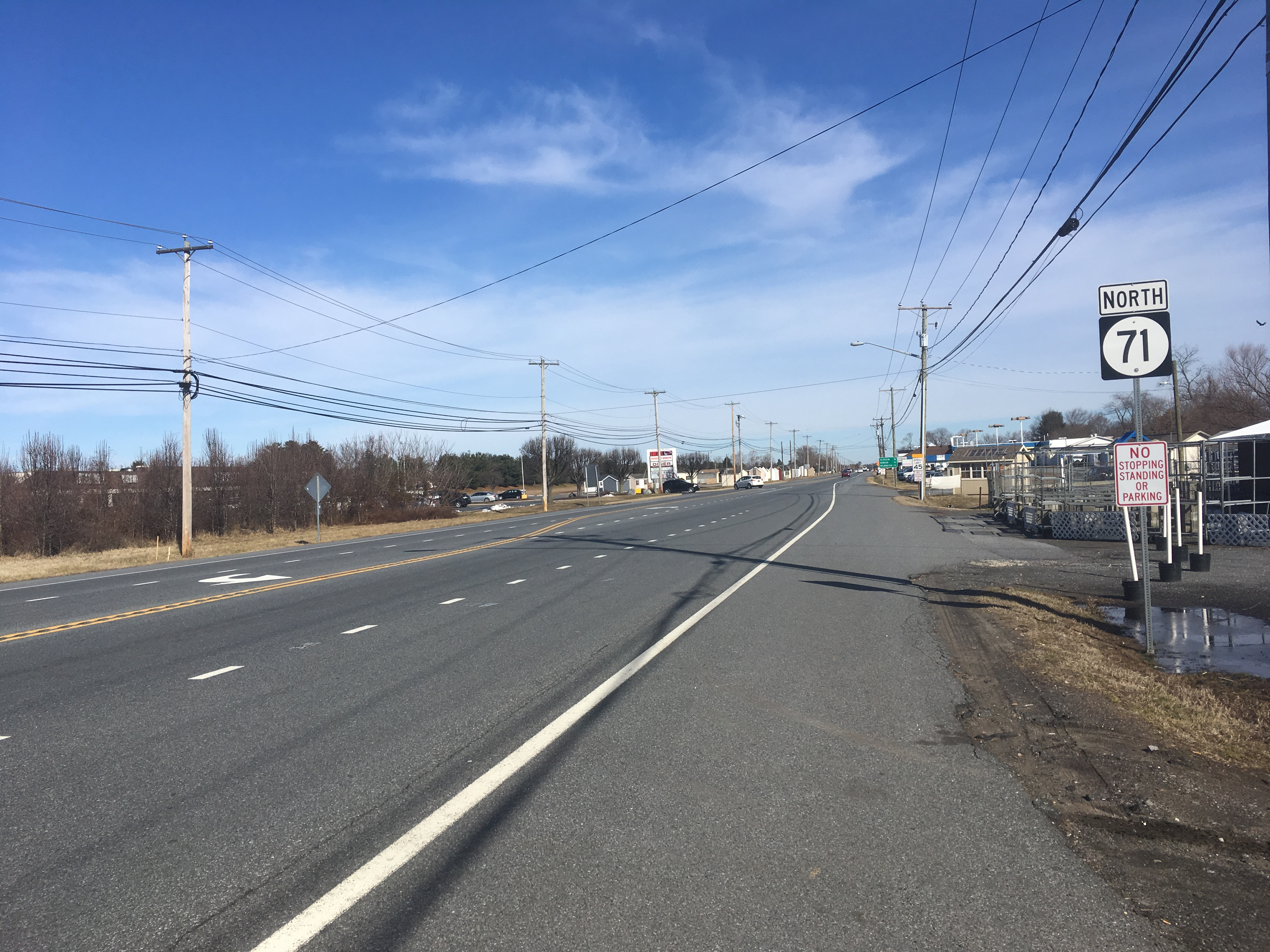
DE 71 northbound past Middletown Warwick Road in Middletown

DE 71 heads to the northwest from US 13 at H and H Corner on two-lane undivided Summit Bridge Road, passing through wooded areas with some homes. The road passes to the east of the town of Townsend and intersects Main Street/Pine Tree Road in an area of businesses. Past Townsend, the route continues northwest into farmland, crossing the Appoquinimink River and making a turn to the north. Farther north, the road intersects Noxontown Road. DE 71 enters residential areas as it crosses Deep Creek into the town of Middletown, where it becomes South Broad Street. The road heads north through the town and intersects DE 299 (Main Street) in the downtown area. From this point, the route becomes North Broad Street and passes more homes before running near businesses. DE 71 crosses the Delmarva Central Railroad's Delmarva Subdivision line at-grade and intersects Middletown Warwick Road immediately after.

DE 71 heads north on Summit Bridge Road, leaving Middletown. The road runs a short distance to the west of the Delmarva Central Railroad line as it continues through farmland with some scattered residential and commercial development. DE 71 widens to a four-lane divided highway as it intersects Connector Road, which heads west to a dogbone interchange with the US 301 toll road and a park and ride lot, before it briefly gains a center left-turn lane. The route becomes a divided highway again as it passes under US 301 before it narrows back to a two-lane undivided road. In Mount Pleasant, DE 896 joins DE 71 in a concurrency and the road widens to a four-lane divided highway. The road runs between the Summit Airport to the west and housing developments to the east. DE 71/DE 896 heads to the northwest through farm fields before turning to the west and passing a residential subdivision to the south. In the unincorporated community of Summit Bridge, the road intersects the northern terminus of DE 15. Past this intersection, DE 71/DE 896 turns north and crosses over the Chesapeake & Delaware Canal and the Michael N. Castle Trail on the north bank of the canal on the Summit Bridge, a cantilever truss bridge.

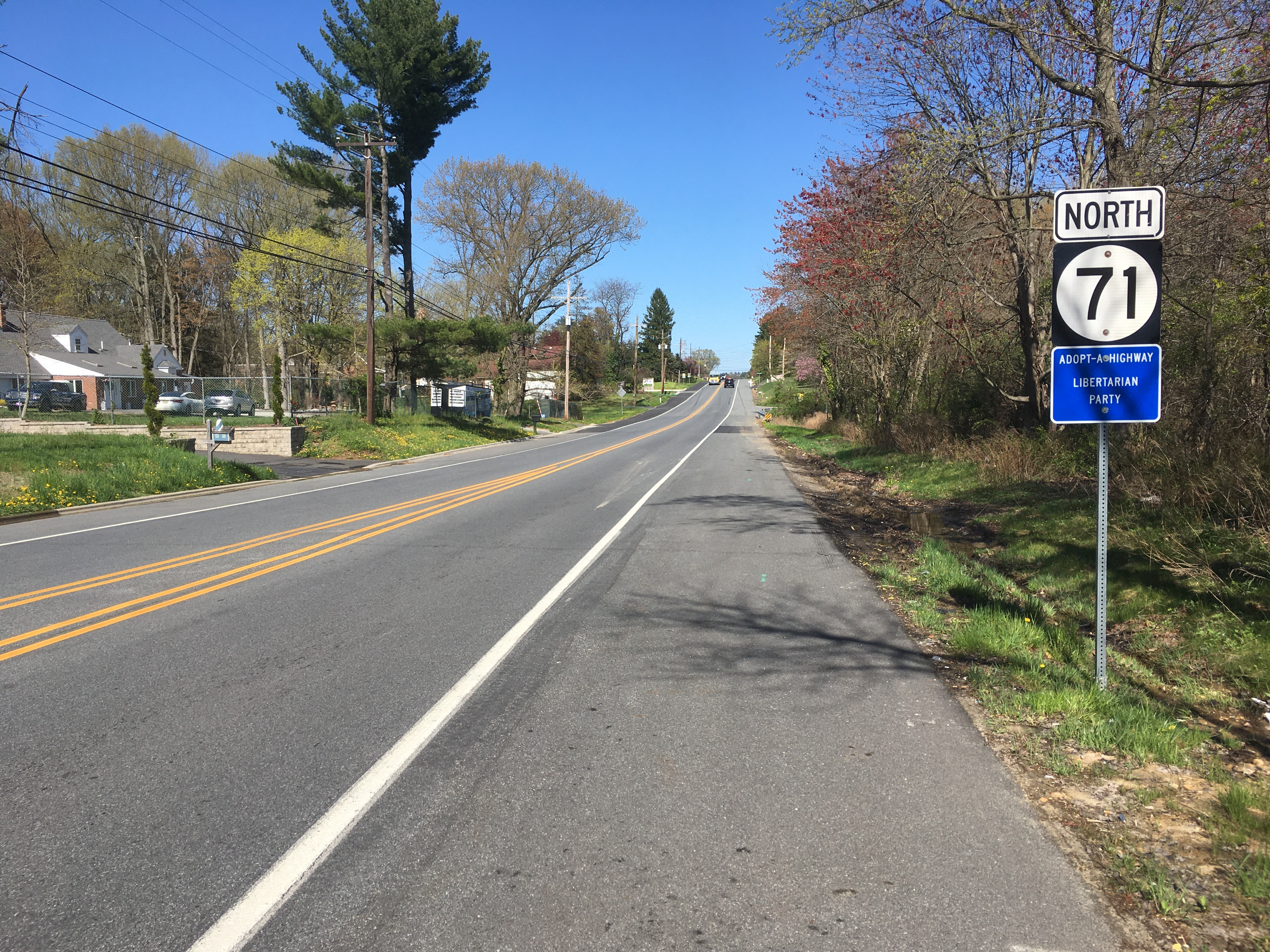
DE 71 northbound past DE 7 in Red Lion

Past the Summit Bridge, the road runs through woods and crosses under Chesapeake City Road before passing east of the Delaware Veterans Memorial Cemetery. DE 71 splits from DE 896 by heading to the southeast on two-lane undivided Red Lion Road. The road passes a mix of woods and homes as it becomes the southern boundary of Lums Pond State Park and turns east. The route curves northeast and continues into a mix of farmland and homes. DE 71 passes through the community of Kirkwood and crosses the Delmarva Central Railroad again at-grade. The road heads across Dragon Creek and runs past suburban residential development before it intersects DE 72 in Williamsburg. The route continues northeast, crossing Norfolk Southern's Reybold Industrial Track railroad line at-grade. From here, the road passes west of Red Lion Christian Academy and runs to the community of Red Lion, where it crosses Red Lion Creek before reaching an intersection with DE 7. The final stretch of DE 71 heads northeast toward its northern terminus at US 13 in Tybouts Corner. This intersection is within an interchange between US 13 and DE 1, where DE 1 merges off US 13. Direct access is provided from southbound DE 1 to DE 71 just before the intersection with US 13.

The portion of the route between Main Street/Pine Tree Road in Townsend and Noxontown Road south of Middletown is part of the Harriet Tubman Underground Railroad Byway, a Delaware Byway. DE 71 has an annual average daily traffic count ranging from a high of 29,685 vehicles at the north end of the DE 896 concurrency to a low of 4,533 vehicles at the DE 7 intersection. The portion of DE 71 between Middletown Warwick Road and the north end of the DE 896 concurrency is part of the National Highway System.

== History ==
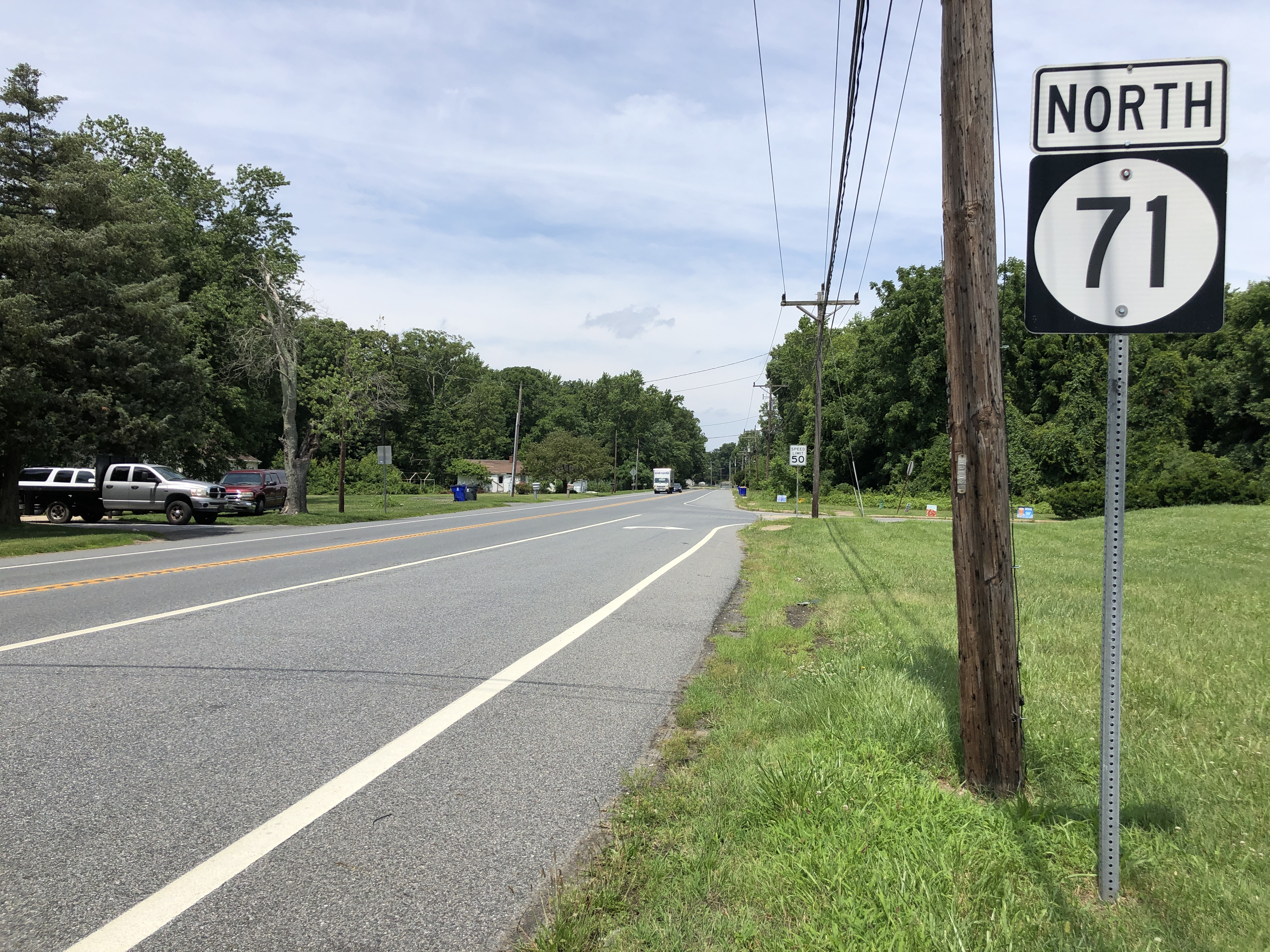
DE 71 northbound past southern terminus at US 13 near Townsend

What is now DE 71 originally existed as a county road by 1920, with the portion south of Townsend proposed as a state highway at this time. By 1924, the entire length of the present route was paved, with the portion from the Summit Bridge to Kirkwood proposed as a state highway and the portion from Kirkwood to Tybouts Corner improved to a state highway. A year later, the state highway had been completed south of Townsend and between Mount Pleasant and Kirkwood. In 1930, the state highway between Middletown and Mount Pleasant was finished. By 1931, the remainder became a state highway. When Delaware started numbering state highways by 1936, this road remained unnumbered. By 1938, DE 71 was designated to run from US 13 south of Townsend north to US 13 in Tybouts Corner, following roughly the same alignment it does today.

By 1957, DE 71 was rerouted to follow DE 299 southwest from Middletown before splitting from that route and reaching the Maryland border, where it connected to MD 71. Also, DE 896 was extended south from Summit Bridge to follow DE 71 to Middletown and then continue along the former DE 71 through Townsend to US 13. By 1959, US 301 was designated along DE 71/DE 299 between the Maryland border and Middletown and US 301S was designated along DE 71 from Middletown to Tybouts Corner. The route was realigned to a new Summit Bridge a short distance to the west in 1960, following new roads that led to the bridge. As a result of this, US 301S/DE 71 was designated onto a former piece of DE 896 between the new alignment and Red Lion Road to the east, with the rest of the former alignment becoming a dead end road south to the canal and the former alignment south of the canal becoming a local road serving the community of Summit Bridge.

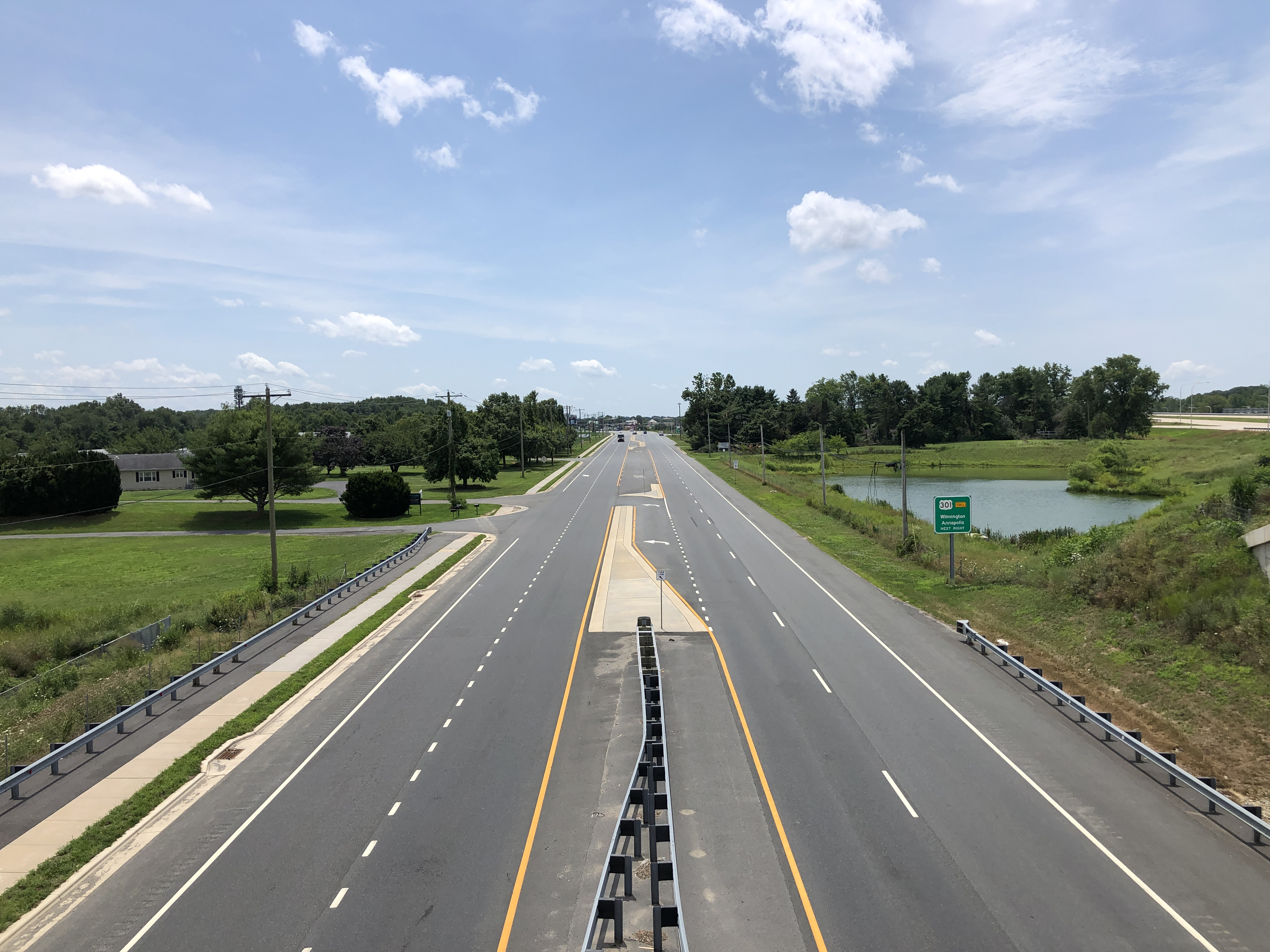
DE 71 southbound at US 301 north of Middletown

In 1971, US 301 was shifted to follow what had been US 301S between Middletown and Summit Bridge, with US 301S remaining along DE 71 between Summit Bridge and Tybouts Corner. By 1984, DE 896 was rerouted to run from Mount Pleasant to Boyds Corner, with the route being removed from DE 71 from Mt. Pleasant to Middletown and the segment from Middletown to south of Townsend, which was the original routing of DE 71, becoming unnumbered. A year later, US 301 was rerouted onto the newly aligned DE 896 and US 13 between Mount Pleasant and Tybouts Corner and removed from DE 71/DE 896 from Summit Bridge to Mount Pleasant. The south end of DE 71 was truncated to DE 896 in Summit Bridge by 1987. By 1990, DE 71 was extended back south along its original alignment to again end at US 13 south of Townsend. US 301 was realigned to follow the route between Mount Pleasant and Summit Bridge in 1992. The concurrency with US 301 between Middletown and Summit Bridge was removed when the US 301 toll road opened on January 10, 2019.

== Major intersections ==
The entire route is in New Castle County.

Location	mi	km	Destinations	Notes
	0.00	0.00	US 13 (Dupont Parkway)	Southern terminus
Middletown	5.73	9.22	DE 299 (Main Street)	
Middletown			US 301 Toll – Wilmington, Annapolis	US 301 exit 5; E-ZPass or toll-by-plate; access via Connector Road
Mount Pleasant	10.04	16.16	DE 896 south (Boyds Corner Road) to US 13 / DE 1 – Dover, Beaches	South end of DE 896 concurrency
Summit Bridge	12.19	19.62	DE 15 south (Bethel Church Road) – Chesapeake City	Northern terminus of DE 15
Chesapeake & Delaware Canal			Summit Bridge	
Summit Bridge	14.14	22.76	DE 896 north (Summit Bridge Road) to I-95 – Newark	North end of DE 896 concurrency
Williamsburg	18.84	30.32	DE 72 (Wrangle Hill Road) – Wilmington, New Castle	
Red Lion	20.75	33.39	DE 7 (Bear Corbitt Road)	
Tybouts Corner	21.99	35.39	US 13 (South Dupont Highway) / DE 1	Ramp from southbound DE 1; DE 1 exit 156A; northern terminus
1.000 mi = 1.609 km; 1.000 km = 0.621 mi: Concurrency terminus; Electronic toll collection
