= Red Lion, Delaware =

Unincorporated community in Delaware, United States

- Unincorporated community
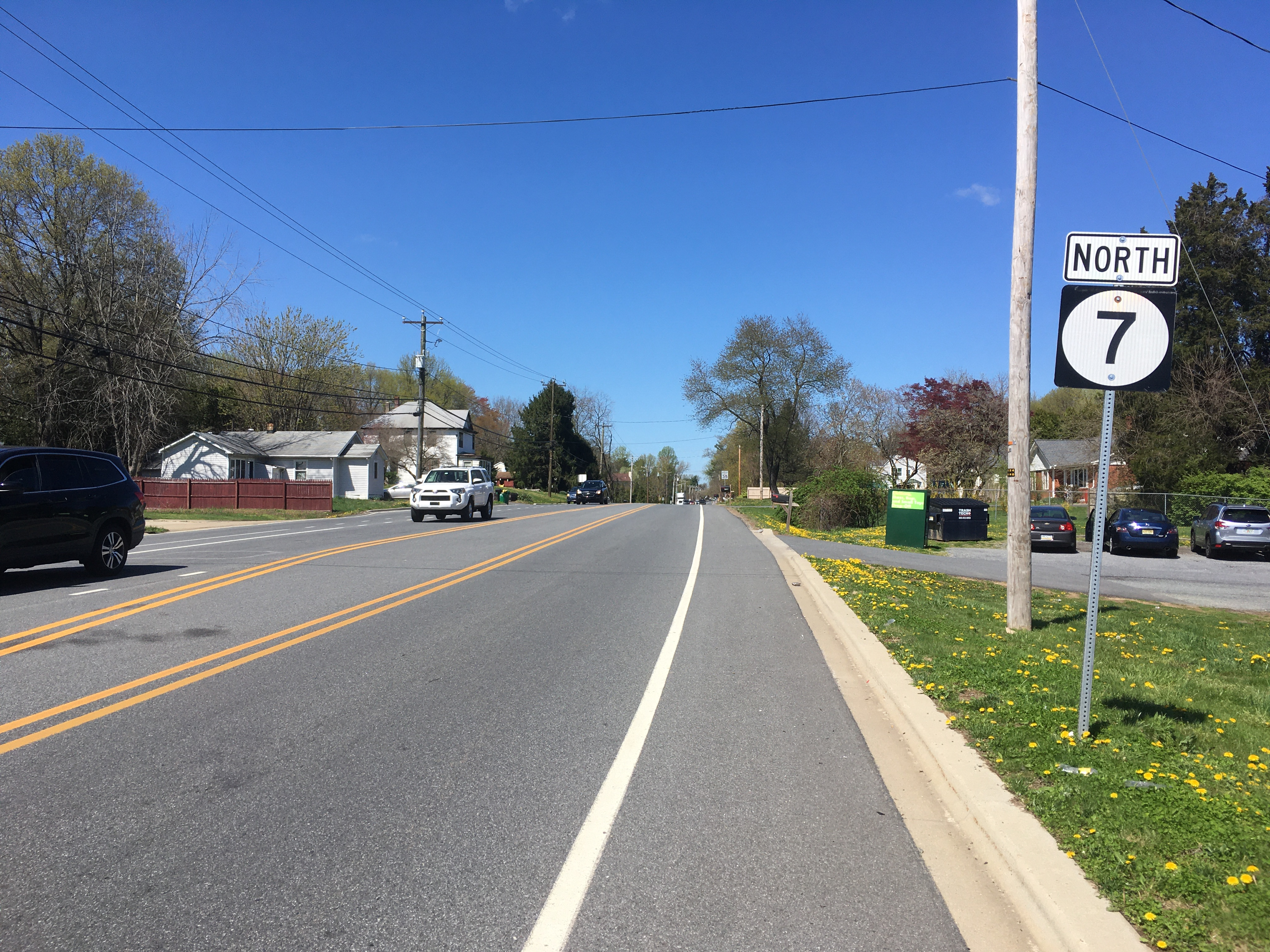

- Location within Delaware Location within the United States
- Coordinates: 39°36′30″N 75°39′50″W
- Country: United States
- State: Delaware
- County: New Castle
- Elevation: 33 ft (10 m)
- Time zone: UTC-5 (Eastern (EST))
  - Summer (DST): UTC-4 (EDT)
- Area code: 302
- GNIS feature ID: 216190

Red Lion is an unincorporated community in New Castle County, Delaware, United States. Red Lion is located at the intersection of Delaware Route 7 and Delaware Route 71, northwest of Delaware City and southwest of New Castle. The community takes its name from a colonial tavern. and lends it name to the Red Lion Hundred.

== See also ==
- Red Lion Creek
