= Red Lion Hundred =

Unincorporated area in Delaware, US

Red Lion Hundred is an unincorporated subdivision of New Castle County, Delaware. Hundreds were once used as a basis for representation in the Delaware General Assembly, and while their names still appear on all real estate transactions, they presently have no meaningful use or purpose except as a geographical point of reference.

== Boundaries and Formation ==
Red Lion Hundred is that portion of New Castle County that lies south of Red Lion Creek, north of the Chesapeake and Delaware Canal and the small remaining portion of St. George's Creek, and generally east of the Red Lion Road (DE Route 71). It was one of the original hundreds in Delaware created in 1682 and was named for Red Lion Creek that runs along its northern boundary. When created it included some of the area now in Pencader Hundred, which was split off in 1710. The city of Delaware City and the community of St. George's are in Red Lion Hundred.

== Development ==
Red Lion Hundred is rural and agricultural in places, but there is considerable suburban development and an industrial area along the Delaware River

== Geography ==
Important geographical features, in addition to the Chesapeake and Delaware Canal, St. Georges's Creek and Red Lion Creek, include the Delaware River, which forms its eastern boundary, Dragon Creek, and Pea Patch Island in the Delaware River. It is entirely in the coastal plain region on the Delmarva Peninsula.

== Transportation ==
Important roads include portions of the Korean War Veterans Memorial Highway (Delaware Route 1), the DuPont Highway (U.S. Route 13), River Road (Delaware Route 9), and Wrangle Hill Road (Delaware Route 72). A portion of the old Delaware Railroad, subsequently the Delmarva branch of the Pennsylvania Railroad, now the Delmarva Central Railroad's Delmarva Subdivision, runs north–south through the western corner of the hundred.
