= John C. Vansant House =

Historic house in Delaware, United States

- U.S. National Register of Historic Places
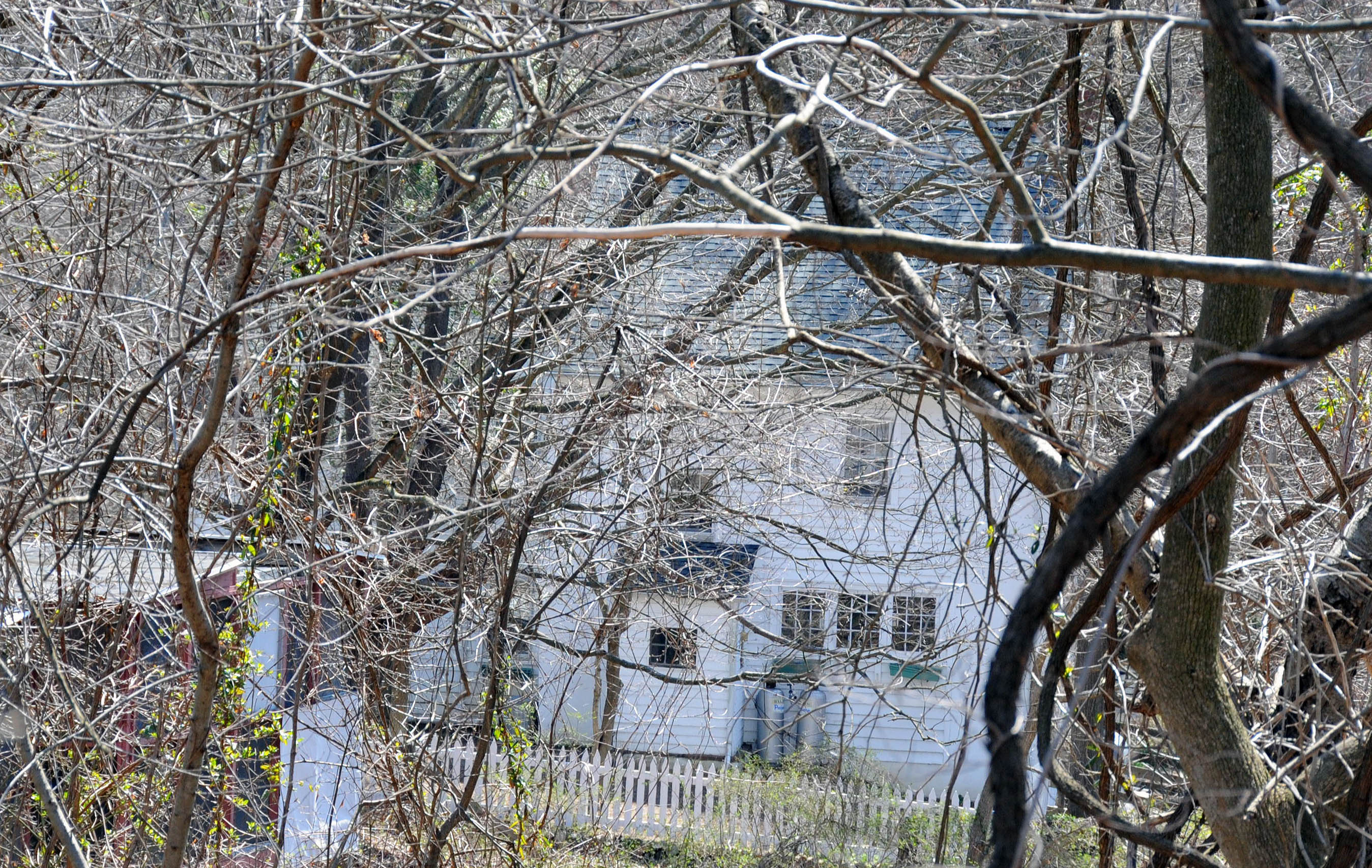

- Location within Delaware Location within the United States
- Location: 110 Possum Hollow Rd., near Newark, Delaware
- Coordinates: 39°42′50″N 75°43′37″W
- Area: 3.5 acres (1.4 ha)
- Architectural style: Federal
- NRHP reference No.: 89000007
- Added to NRHP: February 16, 1989

John C. Vansant House is a historic home located near Newark, New Castle County, Delaware. It was built about 1810, and is a two-story, stone and frame dwelling with a 1 1/2-story, stone and frame addition built about 1936. The house is a double-pile, side hall plan dwelling in the Federal style. Also on the property is a large frame barn (c. 1828, 1936), a frame corncrib (c. 1936), five frame sheds (c. 1936), a stone and frame shed (c. 1936), a frame chicken house (c. 1936), and a frame, open-side equipment shed (c. 1936). In 1980, New Castle County purchased the Vansant property together with the other three properties. These lands constitute about one third of the Middle Run Valley Natural Area.

In 1989, New Castle County leased the property to Tri-State Bird Rescue and Research, a licensed, non-profit, wildlife rehabilitation center. The historic barn on the property underwent extensive renovations before the organization fully relocated there in 1992. Since then, more than 30 outdoor aviaries, a storage shed, and a large flight cage for birds of prey have been constructed on the property behind the barn, now known as The Frink Center for Wildlife.

It was added to the National Register of Historic Places in 1989.

== See also ==
- National Register of Historic Places listings in Newark, Delaware
