= Milford Crossroads, Delaware =

Unincorporated community in Delaware, United States

- Unincorporated community
- Location within Delaware Location within the United States
- Coordinates: 39°42′56″N 75°44′27″W
- Country: United States
- State: Delaware
- County: New Castle
- Elevation: 315 ft (96 m)
- Time zone: UTC-5 (Eastern (EST))
  - Summer (DST): UTC-4 (EDT)
- Area code: 302
- GNIS feature ID: 214309

Milford Crossroads is an unincorporated community in New Castle County, Delaware, United States. Milford Crossroads is located along Delaware Route 72, at the intersection of Possum Park Road/Thompson Station Road and Paper Mill Road, northeast of Newark.
