= Milltown, Delaware =

Unincorporated community in Delaware, United States

- Unincorporated community
- Location within Delaware Location within the United States
- Coordinates: 39°43′51″N 75°39′58″W
- Country: United States
- State: Delaware
- County: New Castle
- Elevation: 121 ft (37 m)
- Time zone: UTC-5 (Eastern (EST))
  - Summer (DST): UTC-4 (EDT)
- Area code: 302
- GNIS feature ID: 216156

Milltown is an unincorporated community in New Castle County, Delaware, United States. Milltown is located at the intersection of Delaware Route 7 and Milltown Road west of Wilmington.
