= Wrangle Hill, Delaware =

Unincorporated community in Delaware, United States

- Unincorporated community
- Location within Delaware Location within the United States
- Coordinates: 39°34′45″N 75°39′27″W
- Country: United States
- State: Delaware
- County: New Castle
- Elevation: 62 ft (19 m)
- Time zone: UTC-5 (Eastern (EST))
  - Summer (DST): UTC-4 (EDT)
- Area code: 302
- GNIS feature ID: 216258

Wrangle Hill is an unincorporated community in New Castle County, Delaware, United States. Wrangle Hill is located at the intersection of U.S. Route 13, Delaware Route 7, and Delaware Route 72 west of Delaware City. The community was named after a feud between two early families.
