= Tybouts Corner, Delaware =

Unincorporated community in Delaware, United States

- Unincorporated community
- Location within Delaware Location within the United States
- Coordinates: 39°37′12″N 75°38′32″W
- Country: United States
- State: Delaware
- County: New Castle
- Elevation: 52 ft (16 m)
- Time zone: UTC-5 (Eastern (EST))
  - Summer (DST): UTC-4 (EDT)
- Area code: 302
- GNIS feature ID: 217024

Tybouts Corner is an unincorporated populated place in New Castle County, Delaware, United States.

== Geography ==
Tybouts Corner is located at the intersection of U.S. Route 13 and Hamburg Road/Bear Tybouts Road just north of an interchange with Delaware Route 1 and an intersection with the northern terminus of Delaware Route 71. Tybouts Corner and has an elevation of 52 feet (16 m).

== History ==
Tybouts Corner is named after George Z. Tybout, a local landowner and agricultural pioneer in the 19th century. His daughter, Ella Tybout, became a noted magazine writer.

The Tybouts Corner landfill opened in 1968. It was initially used only for household waste, but soon industrial waste was deposited there as well, violating state regulations. Fires burned about once a month at the site. The landfill closed in 1971, when it was filled to capacity. In 1980, the Environmental Protection Agency filed suit against New Castle County for its mismanagement of the waste disposal. The EPA listed the former landfill as the second-most hazardous in the country in 1982. It was listed as a Superfund site in 1985.

The Stauffer Chemical Company accidentally contaminated drinking water wells in Tybouts Corner with chemical wastes at its plant in the 1970s. Jacob Wagner, who owned a home that bordered the landfill, had yellow water in their well, and he subsequently sued the county. The heavy soil in the area helped limit the spread of pollution. The plant was purchased by Formosa Plastics Corporation in 1981. In 1985, residents were concerned after an environmental group charged Formosa with releasing vinyl chloride emissions. Scientists suggested that it could have poisoned their water. As a result, the wells were closed and residents had their drinking water piped in.

A gas tanker with 8,400 gallons of gasoline overturned on U.S. Route 13 in Tybouts Corner in February 1986. It possibly hit a patch of ice and spun out of control. Though no fire was reported, police mandated the evacuation of 30 houses in the area.

A temporary gas venting system was installed in 1996. A permanent gas venting system was built in 2000. These systems prevent underground landfill gas from extending beyond the landfill property boundary. In May 2007, the groundwater was considered to have greatly reduced its contents of contaminants, so the EPA and Delaware Department of Natural Resources and Environmental Control shut down the water pumping wells. The following year, quarterly monitoring of the groundwater ended and it has been monitored twice yearly since then.
