= Pike Creek, Delaware =

Census-designated place in Delaware, United States

- CDP
- Location in New Castle County and the state of Delaware.

- Location within the state of Delaware Pike Creek (the United States)
- Coordinates: 39°43′51″N 75°42′15″W
- Country: United States
- State: Delaware
- County: New Castle

Area
  - Total: 2.69 sq mi (6.96 km^{2})
  - Land: 2.69 sq mi (6.96 km^{2})
  - Water: 0 sq mi (0.00 km^{2})
- Elevation: 121 ft (37 m)

Population (2020)
  - Total: 7,808
  - Density: 2,904/sq mi (1,121.2/km^{2})
- Time zone: UTC-5 (Eastern (EST))
  - Summer (DST): UTC-4 (EDT)
- Area code: 302
- FIPS code: 10-56490
- GNIS feature ID: 1867107

Pike Creek is a census-designated place (CDP) in New Castle County, Delaware, United States and is part of the Philadelphia metropolitan area. In 2007, CNN's Money Magazine ranked Pike Creek number 1 on its list of the 100 Best Places to Live in the United States. Pike Creek was the only community in Delaware to appear on the list. The population was 7,808 at the 2020 Census. Local attractions include Middle Run Natural Area, White Clay Creek State Park, Carousel Farm Park and Equestrian Center, Golf and Restaurants. Pike Creek is approximately five miles from downtown Newark, which contains the University of Delaware. Pike Creek is connected to the University of Delaware campus and the Newark downtown area by several bike trails. Pike Creek is approximately 10 miles (16 km) west of the state's largest city, Wilmington, which is a national financial center.

== Geography ==
Pike Creek is located at 39°43′51″N 75°42′15″W (39.7309451, -75.7040991).

According to the United States Census Bureau, the CDP has a total area of 6.1 square miles (16 km^{2}), all land.

== Housing ==
As of 2011, the estimated median house or condo value was $324,403. Detached houses: $357,826; Townhouses or other attached units: $257,807; In 2-unit structures: $319,129; In 3-to-4-unit structures: $140,985; In 5-or-more-unit structures: $169,882. Median gross rent in 2011: $1,560.

== Demographics ==
Historical population
Census	Pop.	Note	%±
1990	10,163		—
2000	19,751		94.3%
2010	7,898		−60.0%
2020	7,808		−1.1%

=== Income and poverty ===
The median income in 2011 was $106,313. About 0.9% of families and 1.6% of the population were below the poverty line, including 1.2% of those under age 18 and 3.9% of those age 65 or over.

=== 2020 census ===
As of the 2020 census, Pike Creek had a population of 7,808. The median age was 45.0 years. 19.4% of residents were under the age of 18 and 19.4% of residents were 65 years of age or older. For every 100 females there were 89.2 males, and for every 100 females age 18 and over there were 85.9 males age 18 and over.

100.0% of residents lived in urban areas, while 0.0% lived in rural areas.

There were 3,184 households in Pike Creek, of which 28.1% had children under the age of 18 living in them. Of all households, 56.1% were married-couple households, 12.1% were households with a male householder and no spouse or partner present, and 27.2% were households with a female householder and no spouse or partner present. About 25.4% of all households were made up of individuals and 10.4% had someone living alone who was 65 years of age or older.

There were 3,255 housing units, of which 2.2% were vacant. The homeowner vacancy rate was 1.1% and the rental vacancy rate was 3.4%.

Racial composition as of the 2020 census
Race	Number	Percent
White	5,667	72.6%
Black or African American	384	4.9%
American Indian and Alaska Native	9	0.1%
Asian	1,186	15.2%
Native Hawaiian and Other Pacific Islander	1	0.0%
Some other race	93	1.2%
Two or more races	468	6.0%
Hispanic or Latino (of any race)	352	4.5%

=== 2010 census ===
As of the census of 2010, there were 7,898 in the CDP. The population density was 3,220.8 inhabitants per square mile (1,243.6/km^{2}). There were 8,415 housing units at an average density of 1,372.2 per square mile (529.8/km^{2}). The racial makeup of the CDP was 88.30% White, 4.09% African American, 0.17% Native American, 5.58% Asian, 0.10% Pacific Islander, 0.63% from other races, and 1.14% from two or more races. Hispanic or Latino of any race were 2.59% of the population.

There were 8,201 households, out of which 30.1% had children under the age of 18 living with them, 52.2% were married couples living together, 8.2% had a female householder with no husband present, and 37.0% were non-families. 29.0% of all households were made up of individuals, and 5.9% had someone living alone who was 65 years of age or older. The average household size was 2.36 and the average family size was 2.98.

In the CDP, the population was spread out, with 22.9% under the age of 18, 8.4% from 18 to 24, 35.0% from 25 to 44, 24.6% from 45 to 64, and 9.1% who were 65 years of age or older. The median age was 36 years. For every 100 females, there were 91.8 males. For every 100 females age 18 and over, there were 88.7 males.

== Education ==
Public school students in Pike Creek attend schools in the Red Clay Consolidated School District in the eastern part and Christina School District in the western part. Pike Creek is home to Goldey-Beacom College and St. Mark's High School.

Zoned elementary schools of Pike Creek in Red Clay include Cooke Elementary School, and Linden Hill Elementary School. Zoned Red Clay middle schools include H. B. duPont Middle School and Skyline Middle School. Red Clay high schools serving sections of Pike Creek include John Dickinson High School and McKean High School.

The portion in the Christina district is zoned to Etta J. Wilson Elementary School, Shue/Medill Middle School, and Newark High School. Previously Grades 5-6 were assigned to Bancroft Intermediate School in Wilmington.

== Attractions ==
- White Clay Creek State Park
- Carousel Farm Park & Equestrian Center
- Middle Run Natural Area

== In popular culture ==
In the season 5 premiere "Sympathy for the Devil" of the CW show Supernatural, Pike Creek is where Lucifer convinces his temporary vessel Nick to allow his possession.

== Three Little Bakers Golf Club Site ==
The owners of Pike Creek Golf Club, formally Three Little Bakers Golf Club, Pike Creek Recreational Services LLC, have been engaged in a lawsuit with New Castle County, Delaware regarding redevelopment of the golf course for housing. In September 2013, a judge ruled that the developers who own the former Pike Creek Golf Course have to preserve 130 acres of land that could function as a golf course and open space. On August 5, 2021, the Delaware Supreme Court upheld the prior decision from 2010 not to designate the 130 acres as open space, reducing the amount of potential homes from 224 to 60.

The Golf Club was a 18 hole semi-private course and operated from 1971 to 2010. It was also the site of a bar, restaurant and dinner theater.
