= Dragon Creek (Delaware River tributary) =

Dragon Creek Tributary to Delaware River
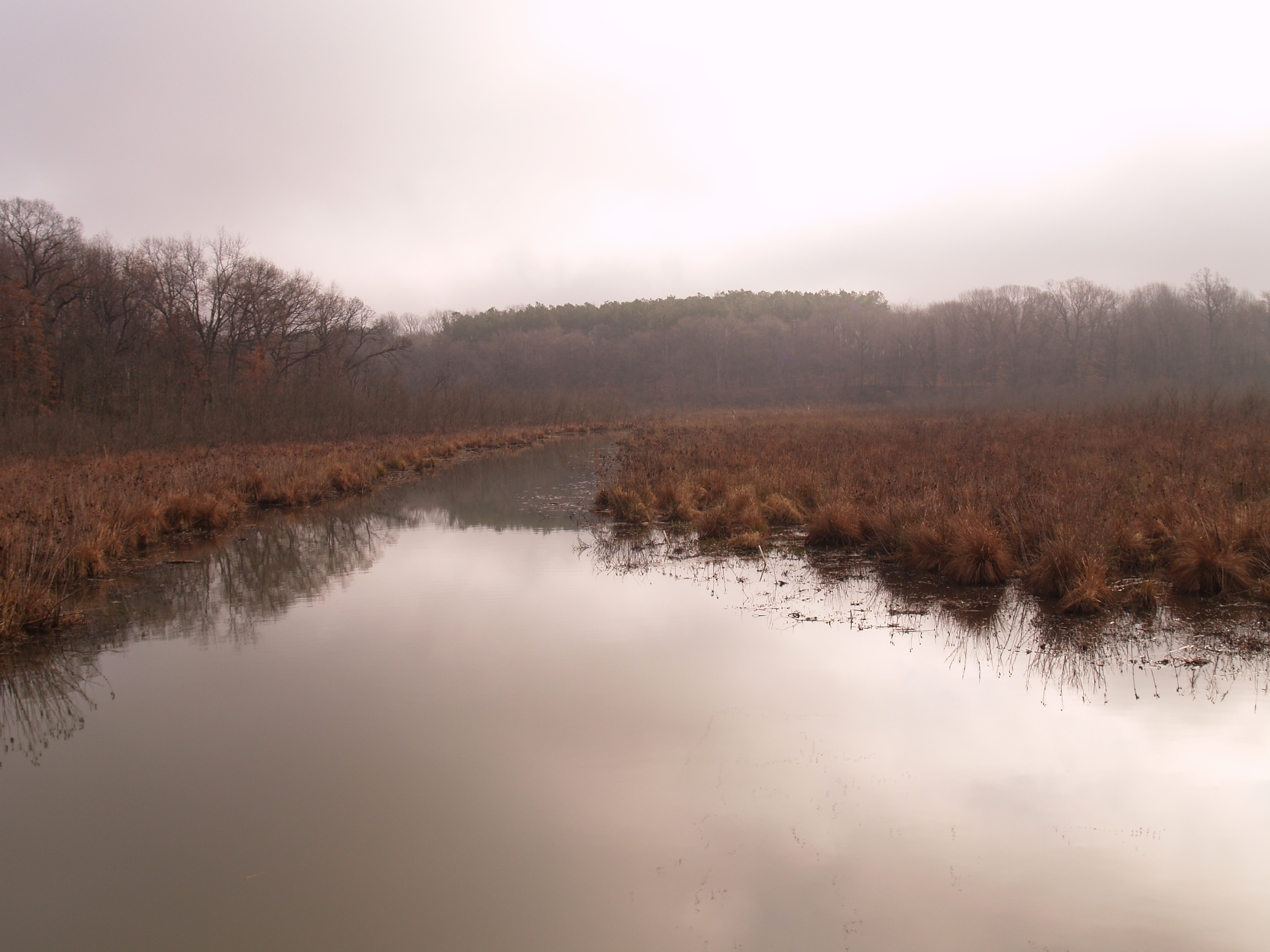
- Dragon Creek from Clarks Corner Road

- Location within Delaware Location within the United States

Location
- Country: United States
- State: Delaware
- County: New Castle
- City: Delaware City

Physical characteristics
- Source: Belltown Run divide
  - location: about 0.25 miles west of Kirkwood, Delaware
  - coordinates: 39°44′44″N 075°42′19″W
  - elevation: 80 ft (24 m)
- Mouth: Delaware River
  - location: Delaware City, Delaware
  - coordinates: 39°35′00″N 075°35′30″W
  - elevation: 0 ft (0 m)
- Length: 7.69 mi (12.38 km)
- Basin size: 12.58 square miles (32.6 km^{2})
- Discharge
  - average: 15.31 cu ft/s (0.434 m^{3}/s) at mouth with Delaware River

Basin features
- Progression: east
- River system: Delaware River
- Tributaries
  - left: unnamed tributaries
  - right: unnamed tributaries
- Bridges: Clifton Drive, Jeffrey Pine Drive, Lovers Lane, Red Lion Road, S Dragon Drive, McCoy Road, DE 1, US 13, Clarks Corner Road, DE 9

Dragon Creek is a 7.69 mi (12.38 km) long 2nd order tributary to the Delaware River in New Castle County, Delaware.

== Course ==
Dragon Creek rises on the Belltown Run divide about 0.25 miles west of Kirkwood, Delaware.

== Watershed ==
Dragon Creek drains 12.58 square miles (32.6 km^{2}) of area, receives about 44.4 in/year of precipitation, has a topographic wetness index of 592.17 and is about 7.9% forested.

== See also ==
- List of rivers of Delaware

== Maps ==
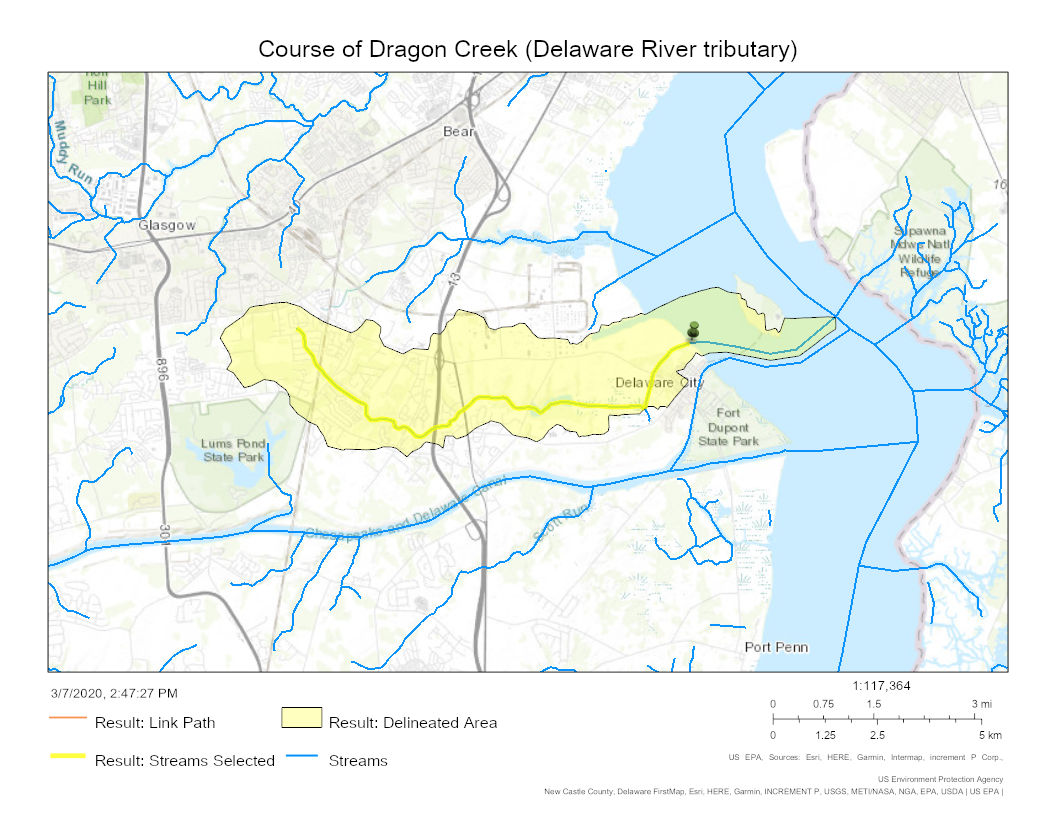
Course of Dragon Creek (Delaware River tributary)

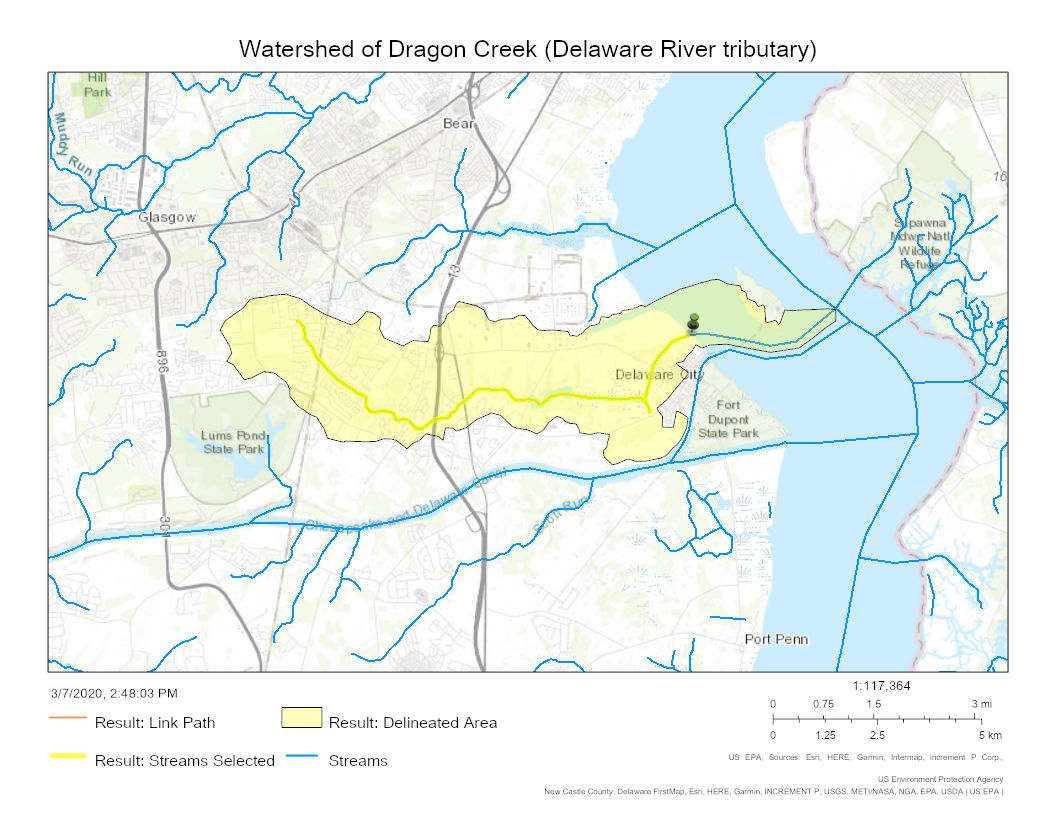
Watershed of Dragon Creek (Delaware River tributary)
