= Middle Run Valley Natural Area =

Public Park

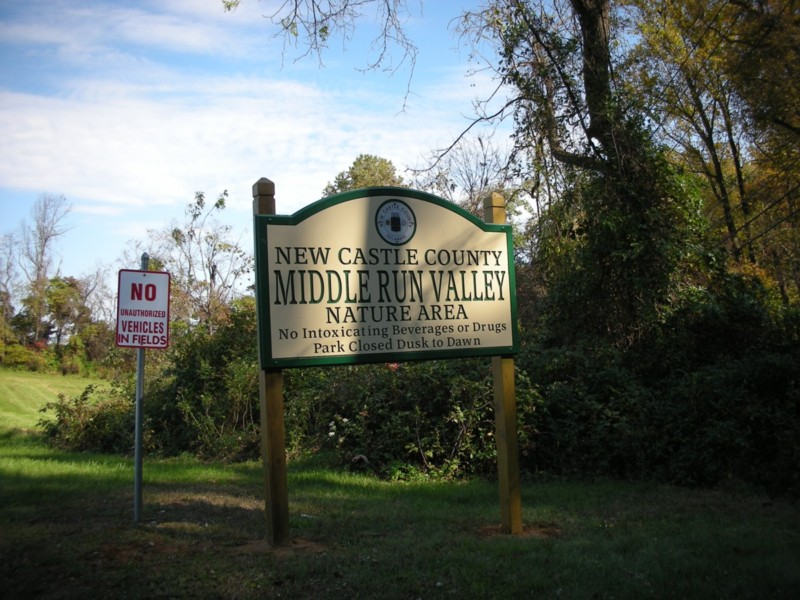
- Main road-entrance to Middle Run Valley Natural Area, off of Possum Hollow Rd.

- Location within Delaware
- Location: New Castle, Delaware, United States
- Coordinates: 39°43′2″N 75°43′22″W
- Area: 850 acres (340 ha)
- Established: 1975
- Named for: Middle Run
- Governing body: New Castle County, Delaware
- Website: New Castle County Parks

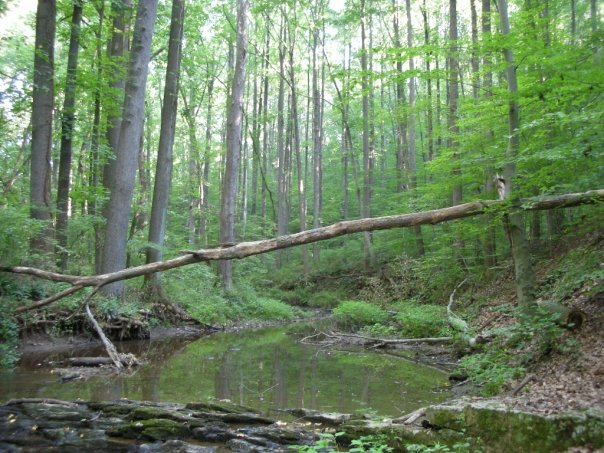
Middle Run, from between Possum Hollow and Snow Goose Trails

Middle Run Valley Natural Area is a nature park owned and maintained by New Castle County, Delaware. The park, known also by its initials MRVNA, is located east of downtown Newark amidst residential neighborhoods and other park land. Establishment of MRVNA was begun in 1975; eventually the park reached its current 850 acres (3.4 km^{2}) of forests, fields, creeks, and ponds. The most important of the creeks is Middle Run, which is a tributary of White Clay Creek, and flows mainly north to south through the park. The John C. Vansant House is located in the Middle Run Valley Natural Area.

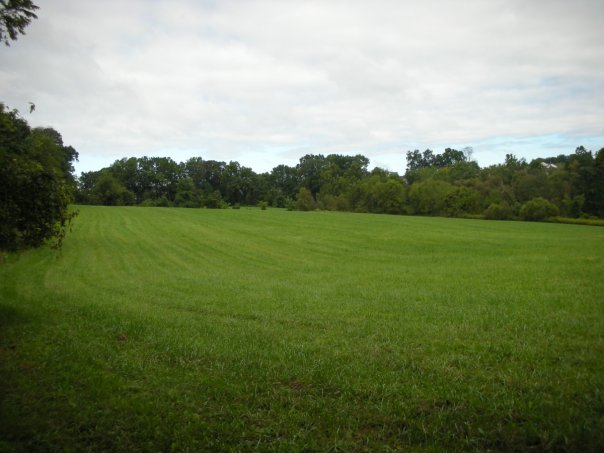
A field along the Lenape Trail

There is no admission fee for MRVNA. The main entrance is a gravel road that turns north off Possum Hollow Rd. (Past this entrance, a little further down along Possum Hollow Rd., can be found the headquarters of Tri-State Bird Rescue and Research.) A long connector trail extends north from the Lenape Trail to Papermill Park (a public park with ball fields, a jogging track and playground, located at the intersection of Paper Mill Road and Polly Drummond Hill Road). The primary roads that surround the park are Possum Park Road along the southwest, Smithmill Road on the north, Polly Drummond Hill Road on the east, and Paper Mill Road on the west. Fox Den Road cuts across the northern portion of the park.

MRVNA borders and connects with two portions of White Clay Creek State Park: the Possum Hill area on the northwest and the Judge Morris Estate on the southeast. In addition, William Redd Park (of the city of Newark) can be accessed from the east side of Possum Park Road thus making possible a nearly continuous nature-park hiking route from the Judge Morris Estate on the east to the Newark Reservoir on the west. Most recently it has become possible to proceed from the northeastern corner of the park, at Smithmill Road, to the northwest along Middle Run via a recently established trail northwestward amidst residential areas, ending at Curtis Mill, from which one may reach the northeasternmost sector of White Clay Creek State Park by crossing Paper Mill Road.

MRVNA accommodates automobiles in its parking lot off of Possum Hollow Road. The park area proper is meant for recreation on foot or on bicycle, with hunting allowed on occasion. There are 10 trails in the park with a total distance of 15.76 miles (25.36 km). As with White Clay Creek State Park, trail markers help to guide visitors; and several footbridges and boardwalks ease crossing of creeks and other wet spots, with stone or concrete steps in a few places. While the trails consist primarily of packed dirt, certain spots along the trails include also structures made of logs for mountain-bikers to test their skill.

The most important trails in MRVNA are Lenape Trail on the north, Double Horseshoe Trail on the southwest, Possum Hollow Trail on the south, and Snow Goose Trail on the southeast. This last trail is shared with White Clay Creek State Park, thus allowing connection across Polly Drummond Hill Road with Judge Morris Estate. In addition, there are several shorter trails and connectors (with and without names); a few spurs off of surrounding roads lead to MRVNA trails.

== Bibliography ==
- Gelbert, Doug. Doggin' Delaware: The 40 Best Places to Hike with Your Dog in the First State (Montchanin, DE: Cruden Bay Books, 2007), p. 24-25.
