= Tri-State Bird Rescue and Research =

U.S. non-profit organization

Tri-State Bird Rescue & Research, Inc.
- Location: United States
- Website: tristatebird.org

Tri-State Bird Rescue and Research, Inc. is a nonprofit conservation organization in Newark, Delaware, dedicated to indigenous wild bird rehabilitation, especially rehabilitation efforts related to oil spills. It is notable for its research and rehabilitation efforts concerning wildlife affected by oil spills, which have been international in scope.

== History ==
Tri-State Bird Rescue and Research was established in the winter of 1976 after the Liberian oil tanker Olympic Games ran aground in the Delaware River. The original focus of the organization concerned the study, treatment, and development of methods to remove oil from wildfowl in the case of a future oil spill.

In 1982, the organization established a full-time Wild Bird Clinic in order to care for and rehabilitate injured or orphaned wild birds and fledglings. This operation grew rapidly and moved into a newly built facility in 1989.

The first Effects of Oil on Wildlife Conference (EOW) was established and hosted by Tri-State Bird Rescue in 1982. The purpose of this conference was to bring together wildlife experts from a variety of disciplines in order to address the issue of wildlife affected by oil spills. A second EOW conference was held in Washington, DC, in 1990. The conference has continued to meet every 2–3 years since then, most recently in Baltimore, Maryland, in 2018.

In 1991, members of the Tri-State Oil Spill Response Team traveled to the Middle East, sponsored by UNESCO, in order to assist with response efforts related to the intentional destruction of oil fields and transport ships during the Gulf War.

In 2001, the organization was invited by the U.S. Fish and Wildlife Service to help draft the "Best Practices for Migratory Bird Care During Oil Spill Response" document, to serve as a guide for personnel seeking to provide care for affected birds during an oil-spill containment effort.

Tri-State oil-spill staff have been involved in incidents near Spain, France, South Africa, the Galapagos Islands, as well as many domestic incidents across the United States. Tri-State was the lead wildlife rehabilitation response organization during the 2010 Deepwater Horizon oil spill in the Gulf of Mexico.

== Activities ==
Tri-State oil-spill response staff train volunteers, engage in rehabilitation efforts, and work in concert with other organizations and agencies in order to develop responses to oil-spills. Tri-State staff and affiliates also conduct research regarding methods by which affected wildlife may be rehabilitated.

Tri-State staff also cooperate with interns and researchers from universities and institutions in order to conduct bird-related research not directly applicable to oil-spill situations. The organization has assisted the USGS with a study concerning the effects of lead and pesticide exposure on fish-eating birds, as well as surveys of the prevalence of West Nile virus among birds in the region.

The organization's Wild Bird Clinic is one of the largest of its type in the United States, and handles the rehabilitation of birds from the region (and also from elsewhere within the United States), with the aim of eventual release to the wild. The facility operates under federal and multiple state permits, and is staffed by both veterinary staff and volunteers. This clinic handles more than two thousand birds annually. It is currently housed within the Frink Center for Wildlife.

In addition to oil-spill response and bird rehabilitation, the staff and organization also publish papers and journals, and provide workshops and training for affiliate and local personnel from other organizations and agencies elsewhere.
