= Ogletown, Delaware =

Unincorporated community in Delaware, United States

- Unincorporated community
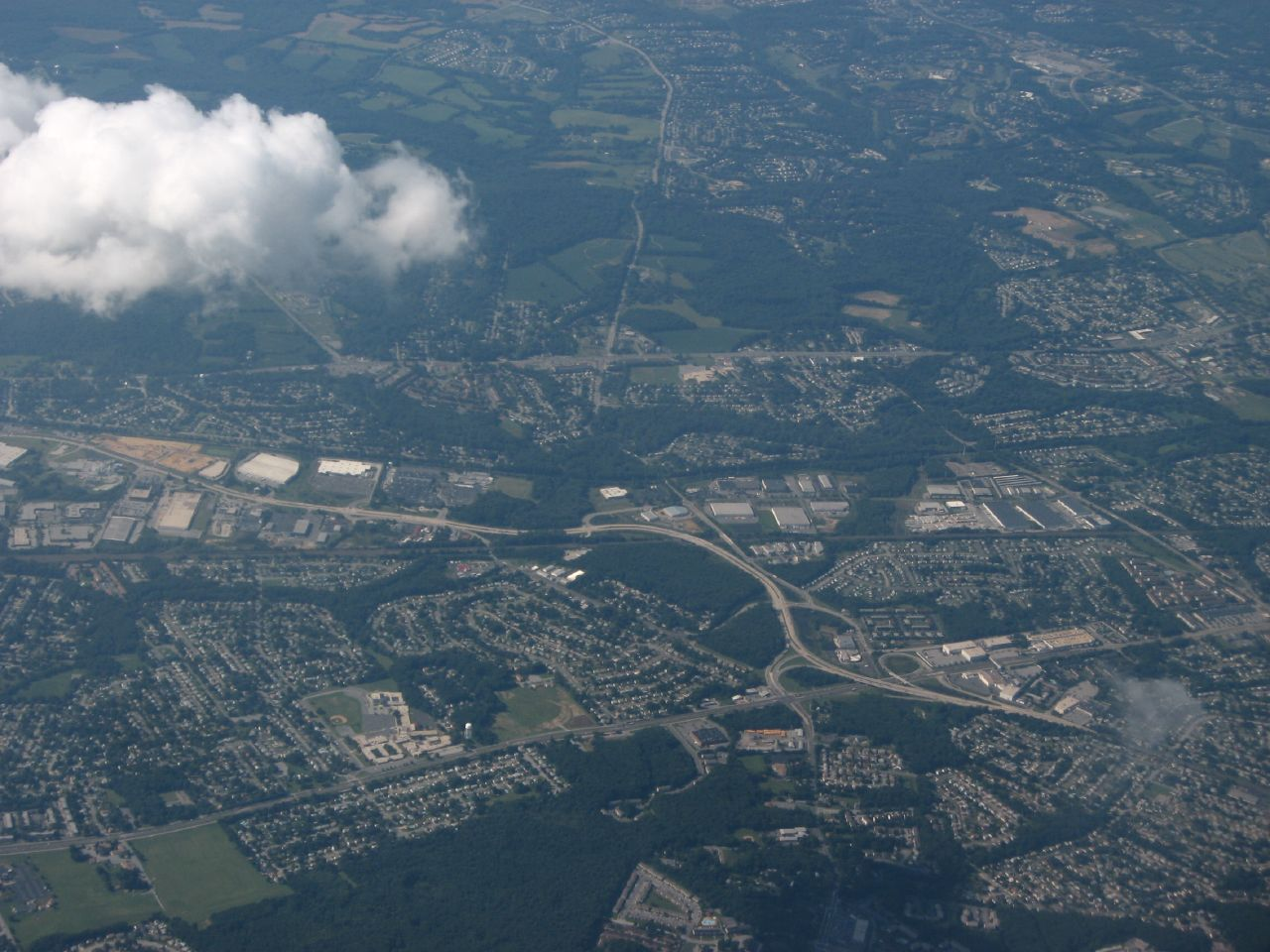
- Aerial view of Ogletown

- Location within Delaware Location within the United States
- Coordinates: 39°40′41″N 75°41′51″W
- Country: United States
- State: Delaware
- County: New Castle
- Elevation: 79 ft (24 m)
- Time zone: UTC-5 (Eastern (EST))
  - Summer (DST): UTC-4 (EDT)
- Area code: 302
- GNIS feature ID: 214405

Ogletown is an unincorporated community in New Castle County, Delaware, United States. Ogletown is located at the junction of Delaware routes 4 and 273, 3 miles (4.8 km) east of Newark. It is common lore that Maryland Bank (MBNA) is "the bank that ate Ogletown", after the State of Delaware awarded MBNA economic incentives to relocate, usurp and raze most of its historic structures and commerce by the late 1980s. MBNA went on to provide numerous jobs to area residents and played a large role in Ogletown's suburban growth.

== History ==
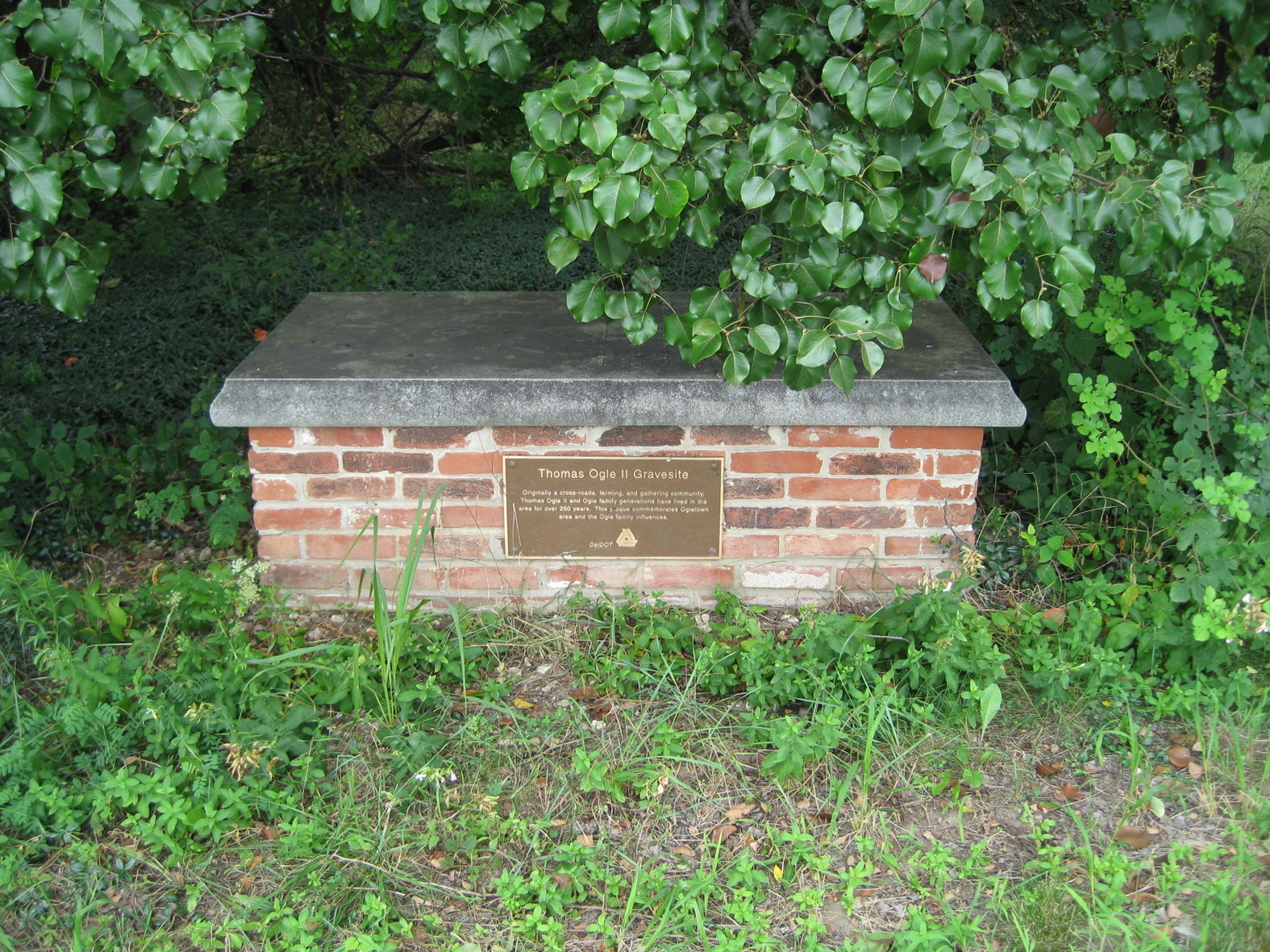
Thomas Ogle's Gravesite as of August 2021

John Ogle came from England in September 1664 as a member of Colonel Richard Nicoll’s military force, serving under Captain Robert Carr. His son, Thomas (born 1666–1672, died 1734), became an early American landowner in what is today central New Castle County Delaware. Ogletown is named after his son Thomas Ogle II (born about 1705, died 1771), who settled in the area of present-day Delaware Route 273 and Delaware Route 4 in the 1730s. The burial site of Thomas Ogle II is isolated within a highway cloverleaf, and is the focus of an effort currently underway to recognize him and to revitalize the area. The name is associated with the area from before 1774; in the late 19th century it was a small village with a store, a post office, and about half a dozen houses. Additional homes and businesses sprang up throughout the 20th century. Ogletown eventually lost its village-like character to suburban sprawl, road re-alignments, the arrival of Maryland National Bank (MBNA), and the construction of arterial highways.

- Ogletown prospered during the 17th century because of a location along one of the major transpeninsular roads laid out in Delaware, extending from the Head of Elk on the Chesapeake Bay to Christiana Bridge. The dogleg nature of the roads in the Ogletown area created an ideal situation for the creation of a hamlet-type community, including an inn and place of lodging.
- From 1994-1999, a road expansion project of Route 273 obliterated any remnants of the original hamlet. In the course of highway construction, the grave of Thomas Ogle II was uncovered, "badly disturbed by road construction and the construction of a gas station on the site." As part of the project, and with the generous financial support of the Ogle Family Association (O/OFA), the Delaware Department of Transportation (DelDOT) restored the rectangular brick base and capstone, leaving Thomas' remains untouched, in what is now green space inside the new cloverleaf intersection. Only a small plaque on the brick base commemorates the history of the town.
- In 2016, a group called Save the Orphanage Property (STOP) began a campaign to preserve Ogletown's last remaining open space suitable for a regional park. The land was owned by the Felician Sisters of North America, and was located in the town's western flank. The effort was defeated in 2018, with Advocates citing multiple examples of government corruption as the primary cause.
- In 2021, a group called Ogletown Resilience submitted an application with Delaware Public Archives for a historical marker, to begin an effort to recognize Ogletown, given that the town's founder, Thomas Ogle, died in 1771, 250 years ago. Approval for the marker was announced on March 10, 2022.

Today, residents and businesses in the area have Newark postal addresses, and the name Ogletown survives primarily in the names of Ogletown Road and Ogletown-Stanton Road.

== 250-year anniversary and commemoration ==
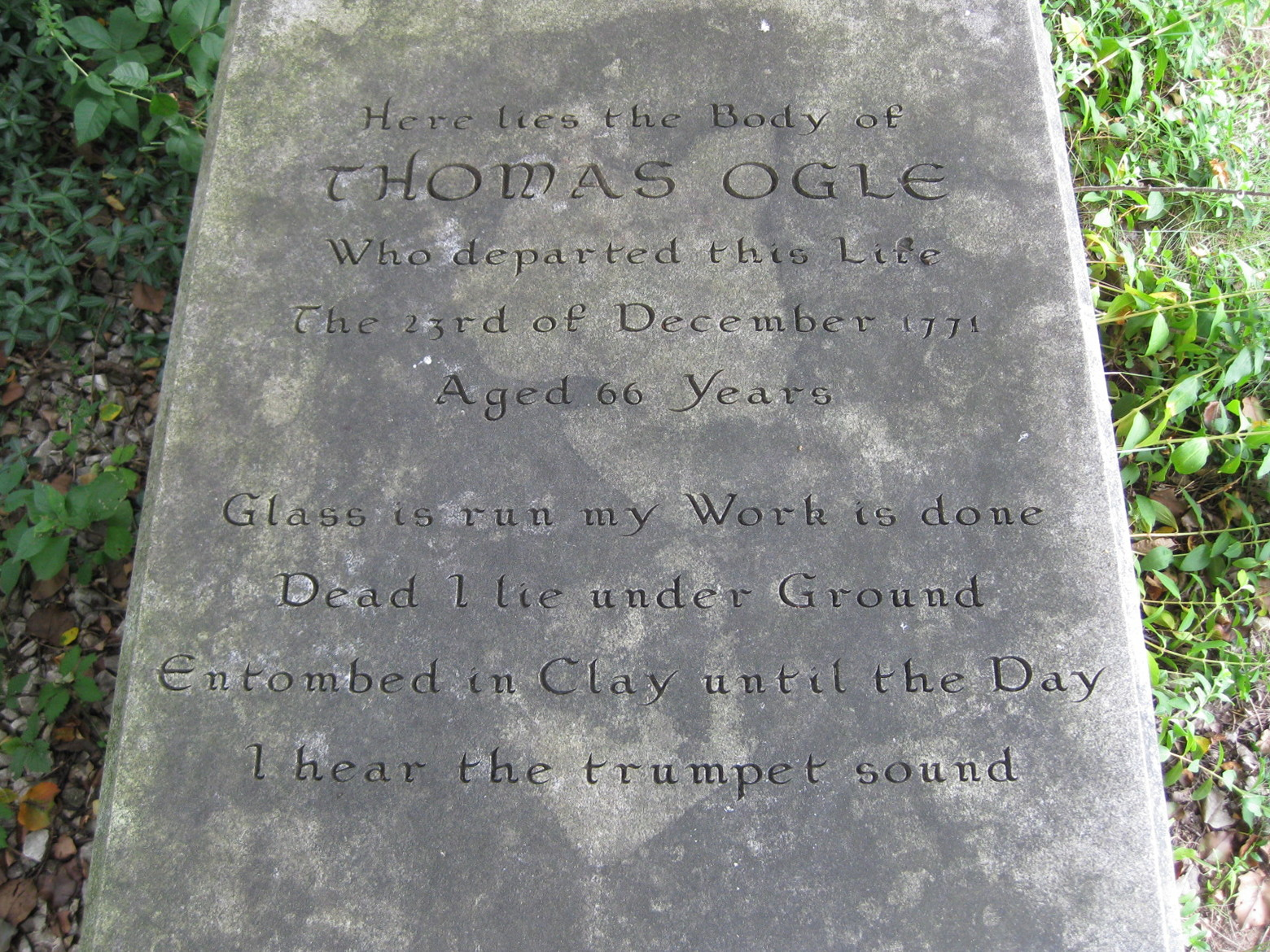
Thomas Ogle's epitaph as of August 2021. The founder of Ogletown died on December 23, 1771, marking 250 years.

Thomas Ogle's restored gravesite commemorates the Ogletown area and the Ogle family influence, however, it is poorly maintained with no visible emphasis on history, place making and public access. Advocates, in conjunction with the group Ogletown Resilience, and Delaware Public Archives, began an effort to recognize Ogletown, given the anniversary of Thomas Ogle's death in 1771, 250 years ago. Advocates submitted an application asking that a historical marker be added to the gravesite, and approval was granted on March 10, 2022.

Advocates are also seeking AASHTO-compliant pathway infrastructure, provisional car parking with Ogletown Baptist Church, and cultural and wayfinding signage within the same project. Such pathways are required by Federal law to meet American Disabilities Act (ADA) and Public Right-of-Way Accessibility guidelines (PROWAG). DelDOT has routinely waived motor vehicle access and parking at Thomas Ogle's gravesite given highway speeds and safety concerns. There is, however, the East Coast Greenway (ECG), a poorly maintained walking-bicycling pathway facility directly abutting Route 4 that passes within 50 yards. In conjunction with the historical marker application, it has been requested that the ECG and two popular local pathway connectors be repaved and tied together as per Delaware MUTCD and Complete Streets guidelines. This also includes re-aligning the ECG to connect with the gravesite and wayside amenities.

One possible name for the project includes "Ogletown Greenway", at a total distance of 0.5 miles. A preliminary meeting was held on December 10, 2021, that included Advocates, Delaware's Marker Program Coordinator, and two State Legislators, all of whom are very supportive. Meetings have since taken place with the goal of coalition-building, recently among them is Delaware Greenways. Delaware Greenways has pledged support for an Ogletown Greenway, and to include it in their project library, but will not partner with Ogletown Resilience or 1st State Bikes—the latter also based in Ogletown. Advocates have asked for periodic updates from Senator Walsh, and are hopeful that the above new infrastructure will coincide with the historical marker installation and ceremony in spring 2023. To date, Senator Walsh (Delaware's 9th District) did ask the Delaware Dept of Transportation (DelDOT) to perform maintenance on the ECG's existing asphalt, which amounted to the patching of a few short sections.

As of May 21, 2025, no historical marker has been installed, and no visible infrastructure progress made.

== Ogletown regional park controversy ==
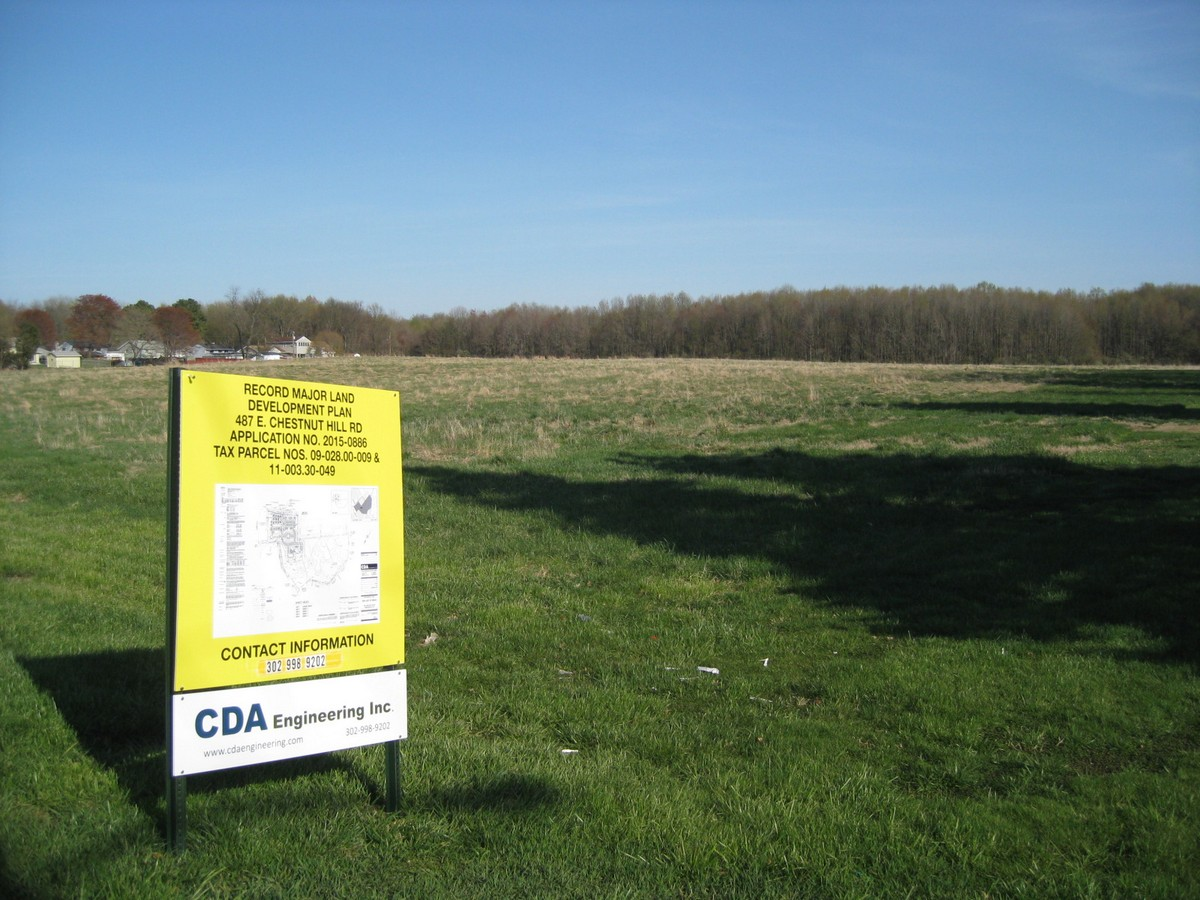
Our Lady of Grace Orphanage Property on Route 4 in western Ogletown, April 2016

In 2011, the Felician Sisters of North America started plans to develop their abandoned 180 acre Our Lady of Grace Orphanage Property site on Delaware Route 4. The land, in Ogletown's western flank, was the focus of "Save The Orphanage Property" (STOP), a citizen-led advocacy campaign that was launched on Facebook in 2015 to thwart development in favor of a park. Facebook "Likes" and "Reaches" numbered in the thousands, with Ogletown Resilience as their primary PR source. Though privately owned, the Orphanage Property served as a defacto park for the Ogletown-S. Newark region, and was commonly referred to as Ogletown Pond given its large central Vernal Pool. It was designated by DNREC as one of a few remaining high quality critical habitat areas in Delaware, and the last open space suitable for a regional park and active place-making.

The loss of the Orphanage Property to the Chestnut Hill 'Preserve' in 2018 devastated citizens and Advocates, who trusted that the Legislators would fight for them, and that environmental justice would prevail. Today, they continue to publicize government corruption at the State and County levels as the main factor in the loss. This includes conflicts of interest among New Castle County (NCC) Executive Matthew Meyer, his Parks Steering Committee, and the Orphanage Property's developers, followed by the NCC Ethics Commission's refusal to act.
