= Red Lion Creek =

- Location within Delaware Location within the United States

Location
- Country: United States
- State: Delaware
- County: New Castle
- City: Delaware City

Physical characteristics
- Source: watershed divide between Red Lion Creek, C and D Canal, and Christina River
  - location: Porter, Delaware
  - coordinates: 39°35′27″N 075°41′39″W
  - elevation: about 80 feet asl
- Mouth
  - location: Delaware City, Delaware
  - coordinates: 39°36′17″N 075°36′50″W
  - elevation: sea level (0 ft.)
- Length: 4.5 miles

Basin features
- Progression: east
- River system: Delaware River
- Tributaries
  - left: several un-named tributaries
  - right: Doll Run
- Bridges: Porter Road railroad crossing DE 71; DE 7 DE 1 DE 9

Red Lion Creek is a stream in the U.S. state of Delaware. It is a tributary of the Delaware River.

Red Lion Creek took its name from a tavern of the same name near its course in Red Lion.

== See also ==
- List of rivers of Delaware
