= List of newspapers in Delaware =

This is a list of newspapers in Delaware.

== Current ==
Title	Locale	Year est.	Frequency	Publisher/parent company	Notes
Cape Gazette	Lewes		Weekly		
Community News	Hockessin		Weekly	USA Today Co.	
Delaware State News	Dover		Daily	Independent Newsmedia Inc.	
Dover Post	Dover		Weekly	USA Today Co.	
HOY en Delaware	Georgetown	1996	Monthly	HOY en Delaware, LLC	Print, online
Middletown Transcript	Middletown		Weekly	USA Today Co.	
Milford Beacon	Milford			USA Today Co.	
The News Journal	Wilmington		Daily	USA Today Co.	
Newark Post	Newark		Weekly	Adams MultiMedia	
Smyrna/Clayton Sun-Times	Smyrna		Weekly	USA Today Co.	
New Castle Weekly	New Castle County		Weekly		
EL TIEMPO HISPANO	Newark		Monthly	Hola Delaware, LLC	Bilingual, Print, online

== School newspapers ==
Title	Locale	Year est.	Ceased	Frequency	School	Notes
The Hornet Newspaper	Dover		active		Delaware State University	
The Review	Newark	1882	active		University of Delaware	
The Whetstone	Dover		2021		Wesley College	

== Defunct ==
Title	Locale	Year est.	Ceased	Frequency	Publisher/parent company	Notes
Agent's Guide	Faulkland	1888		Semi-monthly		
American Watchman	Wilmington	1814	1822	Semi-weekly	J. Wilson	
American Watchman and Delaware Advertiser	Wilmington	1822	1828	Semi-weekly	James Wilson	
American Watchman and Delaware Republican	Wilmington	1809	1813	Semi-weekly	J. Wilson	
Arrow	Wilmington	c. 1958		Monthly		
Athlete	Wilmington			Monthly		
Blue Hen's Chicken	Wilmington	1848	1854	Weekly	Jeandell & Vincent	
Blue Hen's Chicken and Commonwealth	Wilmington			Semi-weekly		
Blue Hen's Chicken & Delaware Democratic Whig	Wilmington	1845	1848	Weekly	Jeandell & Vincent	
Brandywine Bulletin	Wilmington	1935	1938	Weekly	Press of Kells	
Brandywine Free Press	Wilmington	1934		Weekly	Brandywine Publishing Company	
Brandywine Hundred Gazette	Wilmington	1941		Weekly	K. A. Horner	
Brandywine Hundred News	Grubbs	1928		Monthly	A. N. Andrews	
Brandywine News	Wilmington	1931	1935	Weekly	H. O. Wilson	
Brandywine Record	Wilmington	1946		Weekly	J. R. Riley	
Business Index	Wilmington	1876	1876	Weekly	James Brown	
Christian Reporter	Dover	1875		Weekly	W. L. Gooding and J. P. Gordy	
Claymont News	Claymont			Weekly	Curtis E. Blin-Singer	
Clayton Herald	Clayton	1867	1870	Weekly	Mrs. R. S. McConaughy	
Commuter News Digest	Wilmington	1974	1977	Tri-weekly	Commuter News Digest	
Daily Enterprise	Wilmington	1858		Daily	Bonsell, Atwell & Mason	
Daily Morning News	Wilmington	1880	1880	Daily	Emerson & Conrad	
Daily Post	Newark	1972	1973	Daily	H. Galperin and R. B. Rockwell	
Daily Republican	Wilmington	1874	1890	Daily	G. W. Vernon	
Delaware Advertiser & Star	Wilmington	1832		Weekly	Nathaniel Mitchell	
Delaware Advertiser and Farmer's Journal	Wilmington	1828	1831	Weekly	W. A. Mendenhall	
Delaware Alternative Press	Newark	1979	1985	Irregular	Delaware Alternative Press	
Delaware City Press	Delaware City	1913		Weekly	J. L. Rusbridge	
Delaware Coast News	Rehoboth Beach	1928	1946	Weekly	R. B. Ingram	
Delaware Democrat	Wilmington	1857	1858	Weekly	W. H. White & J. Stradley	
Delaware Free Press	Wilmington	1830		Weekly	Henry Wilson	
Delaware Free Press	Newark	1979	1979		Delaware Free Press	
Delaware Gazette	Wilmington	1820	1828	Semi-weekly	Samuel Harker	
Delaware Gazette	Wilmington	1837	1883	Weekly	J. N. Harker	
Delaware Gazette & American Watchman	Wilmington	1828	1837	Weekly	John Newton Harker	
Delaware Gazette and Peninsular Advertiser	Wilmington	1814	1820	Semi-weekly	M. Bradford	
Delaware Gazette and State Journal	Wilmington	1883	1902	Weekly	Every Evening Publishing Company	
Delaware Inquirer	Wilmington	1859		Weekly	James Montgomery	
Delaware Intelligencer	Smyrna	1872	1873	Weekly	John W. F. Cooper	
Delaware Journal	Wilmington	1827	1832	Semi-weekly	R. Porter & Son	
Delaware Observer	New Castle	1968		Monthly	Delaware Observer	
Delaware Patriot & American Watchman	Wilmington	1828	1828	Semi-weekly	J. F. Clement	
Delaware Patriot and Eastern Shore Advertiser	Wilmington	1816	1816	Semi-weekly	W. S. Buell	
Delaware Pionier	Wilmington	1869	1899	Weekly	Herman Rau	
Delaware Republican and Farmers', Manufacturers' and Mechanics' Advocate	Wilmington	1841	1843	Tri-weekly	H. H. Cannon	
Delaware Republican	Wilmington	1841	1874	Semi-weekly	Allderdice, Jeandell & Miles	
Delaware Sentinel	Dover	1854	1856	Weekly	W. D. Wharton & J. V. Harrington	
Delaware State Journal	Wilmington	1833, 1870	1855, 1883	Semi-weekly, weekly	Henry Eckel	
Delaware State Journal and Statesman	Wilmington	1855	1870	Semi-weekly	Henry Eckel	
Delaware State Journal, Advertiser and Star	Wilmington	1832	1833	Semi-weekly	Porters & Mitchell	
Delaware State Reporter	Dover	1853	1859	Semi-weekly, weekly	G. Nicholson	
Delaware Straight-Out Truth Teller	Wilmington	1872		Semi-monthly	J. A. Brown & W. Dean	
Delaware Sunday News	Wilmington	1964	1965	Weekly?	B. J. Smyth	
Delaware Tribune	Wilmington	1867	1877	Weekly	Jenkins & Atkinson	
Delaware Tribune, and The Delaware State Journal	Wilmington	1877		Weekly	Every Evening Publishing Company	
Delaware Twilight	Wilmington	1886		Weekly	A. Worthington Brinkley	
Delaware Weekly Advertiser and Farmer's Journal	Wilmington	1827	1828	Weekly	W. A. Mendenhall	
Delaware Weekly Morning News	Wilmington	1883		Weekly	News Publishing Company	
Delaware Weekly Republican	Wilmington	1841		Weekly	G. W. Vernon	
Delmarva News	Selbyville	1936	1990	Weekly	Delmarva Publishing Company	
Democratic Free Press and Farmers', Manufacturers' and Mechanics' Advocate	Wilmington	1840	1841	Weekly	Wm. M. Naudain	
Lamp	Wilmington			Monthly		
The Advance	Wilmington	1899	c. 1901	Weekly	P. H. Murray	
The Advertiser	Wilmington	1879	1879	Weekly		
The American Republican	Georgetown	1840	1841	Weekly	H. H. Cannon	
The Argus and Delaware Advertiser	New Castle	1804	1805	Semi-weekly	John Barber	
The Bi-State Weekly	Delmar	1932	c. 1966	Weekly	G. T. & E. F. Jones	
The Bi-State Weekly and the State Register	Delmar	1966		Weekly		
The Brandywine News	Wilmington	1938		Weekly	A. L. Lemon	
The Breakwater Light	Lewes	1871	1890	Weekly	I. H. D. Knowles	
The Clayton Call	Clayton			Weekly	W. G. Hill & Co.	
The Commonwealth	Wilmington	1858		Weekly	W. T. Jeandell & E. B. Pierce	
The Constitutionalist	Wilmington			Quad-weekly	D. S. Gregory & Co.	
The Constitutionalist / The Defender of the People's Rights	Dover	1804	1805	Weekly	Wootten & Allee	
The County Post	Millsboro			Weekly	County Post	
The Daily Gazette	Wilmington	1874	1883	Daily		
The Daily Republican	Wilmington	1902	1905	Daily	Republican Printing and Publishing Company	
The Defender	Wilmington	1965	1967	Weekly	Defender Publishing Company	
The Delaware Abolitionist	Wilmington	1847		Monthly	Delaware Anti-Slavery Society	
The Delaware and Eastern-Shore Advertiser	Wilmington	1794	1799	Semi-weekly	W. C. Smyth & S. & J. Adams	
The Delaware City News	Delaware City	1887		Weekly	News Publishing Company	
The Delaware Courant and Wilmington Advertiser	Wilmington	1786	1787	Weekly	Samuel & John Adams	
The Delaware Defender	Wilmington	1962	1965	Weekly		
The Delaware Democrat	Georgetown	1882	1905	Weekly	Delaware Democrat Publishing Company	
The Delaware Farm and Home	Wilmington	1885		Weekly		
The Delaware Farmer	Milford	1883				
The Delaware Free Press	Wilmington	1856			Order of the Fremont and Dayton Club of Wilmington	
The Delaware Freeman	Wilmington	1810	1810	Weekly	Risley & Skinner	
The Delaware Gazette	Wilmington	1785	1786	Weekly	Jacob A. Killen	
The Delaware Gazette	Wilmington	1789	1789	Weekly	Frederick Craig & Company	
The Delaware Gazette	Wilmington	1791	1799	Semi-weekly	Peter Brynberg & Samuel Andrews	
The Delaware Gazette	Wilmington	1809	1810	Semi-weekly	J. Jones	
The Delaware Gazette	Wilmington	1814	1814	Weekly	M. Bradford	
The Delaware Gazette and General Advertiser	Wilmington	1789	1791	Weekly	Frederick Craig & Company	
The Delaware Gazette / The Faithful Centinel	Wilmington	1786	1789	Weekly	J. A. Killen	
The Delaware Herald	Smyrna	1850	1854	Weekly	A. Poulson	
The Delaware Inquirer	Georgetown	1879		Weekly	Pride & Hart	
The Delaware Intelligencer	Dover	1821	1822	Weekly	S. F. Shinn	
The Delaware Leader	Laurel	1917				
The Delaware Ledger	Newark	1879	after 1934	Weekly	J. M. Bowen & L. K. Bowen	
The Delaware Pilot	Lewes	1891	1940s	Weekly	Delaware Pilot Publishing Company	
The Delaware Porcupine	Wilmington	1938	1966	Irregular	Porcupine Publishing Company	
The Delaware Register, or, Farmers', Manufacturers' & Mechanics' Advocate	Wilmington	1828	1829	Weekly	A. & H. Wilson	
The Delaware Reporter	Wilmington	1940		Weekly	J. Alexis DuBois	
The Delaware Republican	Dover	1907	1949	Weekly	B. F. Simmons	
The Delaware Sentinel and Farmers' and Mechanics' Advocate	Wilmington	1839	1840	Tri-weekly	W. M. Naudain	
The Delaware Spectator	Wilmington	1972	1976	Weekly	Progress Association for Economic Development	
The Delaware Star	Wilmington	1976	1978	Monthly	Herman M. Holloway Jr.	
The Delaware Statesman	Wilmington	1811	1813	Monthly	William Riley	
The Delaware Sun	Newark	1958	1961	Weekly	Cecil Whig	
The Delaware Valley Defender	Wilmington	1967	1980s	Weekly	Defender Publishing Company	
The Delaware Valley Star	Wilmington	1978	1984	Weekly	Felix Stickney	
The Delawarean	Dover	1859	1927	Weekly	James Kirk	
The Delawarean and Farmers' and Mechanics' Advertiser	Wilmington			Weekly		
The Delmar News	Delmar	1904	1904?	Weekly	News Publishing Company	
The Delmarva Leader	Seaford	1930	1944	Weekly	W. Wright Robinson	
The Delmarva Leader and The Seaford News	Seaford	1944	1975	Weekly	W. Wright Robinson	
The Faulkland Quiz	Faulkland	1892	c. 1893	Weekly	John T. Mullins	
The Wilmington Mercury	Wilmington	1798	1798	Irregular	W. C. Smyth	
Weekly Delaware State Journal, Statesman and Blue Hen's Chicken	Wilmington	1855		Weekly	Henry Eckel	
Wilmington Lokal Anzeiger und Wilmington Freie Presse	Wilmington	1880	c. 1918	Weekly	Max Goetz	
Wilmington Wayside	Wilmington	1873		Weekly	Thomas F. Hicks	

== Unconfirmed ==
Title	Locale	Year est.	Ceased	Frequency	Publisher/parent company	Notes
Wilmington Chronicle	Wilmington	1760	1760			(Note: There have been mentions that the Wilmington Chronicle, supposedly published in 1760, was the first newspaper in the state. However, no evidence of this has been shown.)
Wilmington Courant	Wilmington	1762	1762	Weekly	James Adams	(Note: Some have stated that rather than the Wilmington Chronicle, the Wilmington Courant was the first newspaper in Delaware history. They declare that the paper was published by James Adams, the first printer in the state, during 1762. However, no copies of this paper are known to exist.)

== See also ==
- Delaware media
  - List of radio stations in Delaware
  - List of television stations in Delaware
  - Media of locales in Delaware: Dover, Wilmington
U.S. newspapers

Comprehensive

- Lists of newspapers
- List of newspapers in the United States

Frequency

- List of free daily newspapers in the United States
- List of weekly newspapers in the United States

Circulation

- List of international newspapers originating in the United States
- List of national newspapers in the United States
- List of newspapers in the United States by circulation
- List of newspapers serving cities over 100,000 in the United States

Foreign language

- List of French-language newspapers published in the United States
- List of German-language newspapers published in the United States
- List of Spanish-language newspapers published in the United States

Specialty

- List of African-American newspapers in the United States
- List of alternative weekly newspapers in the United States
- List of business newspapers in the United States
- List of family-owned newspapers in the United States
- List of Jewish newspapers in the United States
- List of LGBTQ periodicals in the United States
- List of student newspapers in the United States
- List of supermarket tabloids in the United States
- List of underground press in the United States

Other

- List of defunct newspapers of the United States

== Bibliography ==
- S. N. D. North; United States Department of the Interior (1884). "Catalogue of Periodical Publications: Delaware". History and Present Condition of the Newspaper and Periodical Press of the United States. Washington, D.C.: Government Printing Office. OCLC 1850475.
- "Delaware". American Newspaper Directory. New York: George P. Rowell. 1900. hdl:2027/umn.31951002273861a.
- "Delaware". American Newspaper Annual & Directory. Philadelphia: N. W. Ayer & Son. 1922. pp. 139+. hdl:2027/umn.31951001295695n – via HathiTrust.
- Federal Writers' Project (1938), "The Press", Delaware: A Guide to the First State, American Guide Series, NY: Viking Press, pp. 134–135, ISBN 9781603540087 – via Google Books
- Ben H. Bagdikian (1964). "Case history: Wilmington's 'independent' newspapers". Columbia Journalism Review. 3.
- Ben H. Bagdikian (1973). "The temporarily (?) independent papers of Wilmington". Columbia Journalism Review. 12.
