= List of Delaware Byways =

Delaware Byways
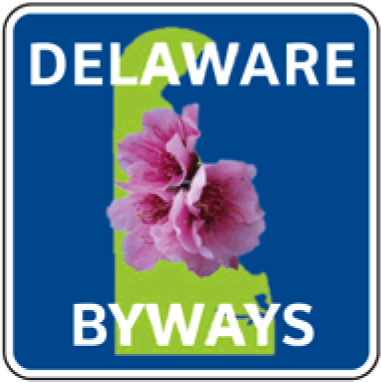
- Delaware Byways signage

System information
- Formed: 2000

Highway names
- Interstates: Interstate X (I-X)
- US Highways: U.S. Route X (US X)
- State: Delaware Route X (DE X)
- Maintenance road numbers: Road X

System links
- Delaware State Route System; List; Byways

The Delaware Byways (formerly Delaware Scenic and Historic Highways) system consists of roads in the U.S. state of Delaware that travel through areas of scenic and historic interest. The intent of this system is to promote tourism and raise awareness of the communities along these routes.

== History ==
The Delaware Scenic and Historic Highways program was created in 2000 by Senate Bill 320, which authorized the Delaware Department of Transportation to create a system of statewide scenic byways. In 2007, the United States Department of Transportation awarded a $174,600 grant to preserve the Route 9 and Brandywine Valley byways. The Delaware Scenic and Historic Highways program was renamed to the Delaware Byways program in 2010.

== Byways ==
=== Brandywine Valley National Scenic Byway ===
Brandywine Valley National Scenic Byway
- Location: Wilmington–Centerville; Wilmington–Montchanin
- Length: 12.25 mi (19.71 km)

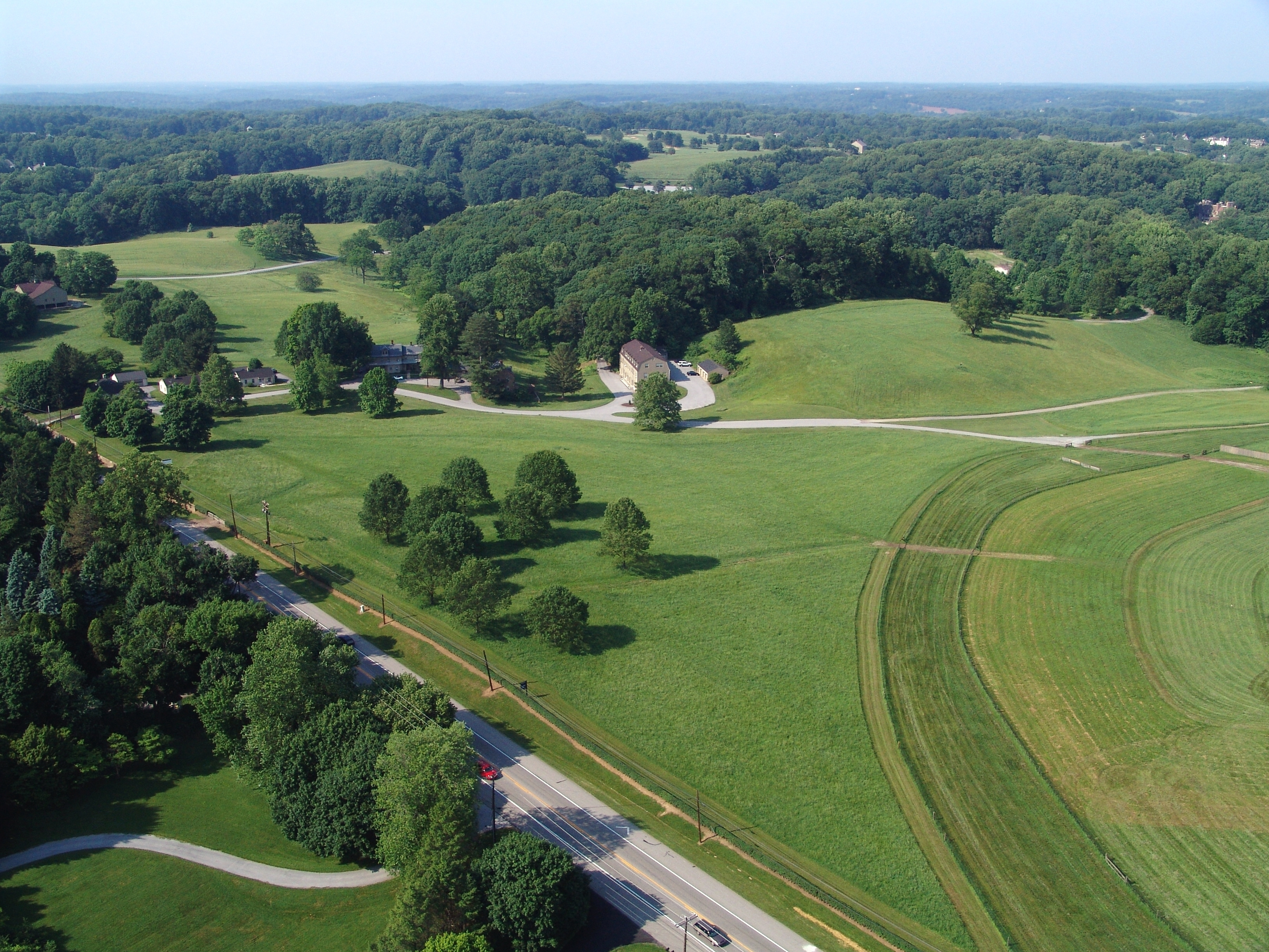
"Chateau Country" along Delaware Route 52

The Brandywine Valley National Scenic Byway is located in New Castle County, Delaware in the Brandywine valley. The route of the byway is along DE 52 from Wilmington north to the Pennsylvania border, and DE 100 from its intersection with DE 52, north to the Pennsylvania border. The byway is also a part of the National Scenic Byways program.

The byway passes by several tourist destinations, including Rodney Square, Hotel du Pont, the Goodstay House, the Gibraltar Mansion, the Delaware Museum of Natural History, Winterthur Museum and Country Estate, and Centreville Village on DE 52 and Montchanin Village, Brandywine Creek State Park, and First State National Historical Park on DE 100. Also near the byway in the Wilmington area is the Delaware Art Museum, Delaware History Museum, Hagley Museum and Library, and Nemours Mansion and Gardens with the Brandywine River Museum and Longwood Gardens farther north in Pennsylvania.

The Brandywine Valley Byway was designated a Delaware Scenic and Historic Highway on June 25, 2002 and a National Scenic Byway on September 22, 2005.

=== Delaware Bayshore Byway ===
Delaware Bayshore Byway
- Location: Lewes–New Castle
- Length: 157 mi (253 km)

The Delaware Bayshore Byway (formerly Route 9 Coastal Heritage Byway) runs along the Delaware Bay and Delaware River from Lewes north to New Castle, with the southern portion consisting of several roads providing access to the Delaware Bay and the northern portion following DE 9; the byway also has a spur to Odessa. The byway provides access to several natural and historical sites and towns along the Delaware Bay and inland rivers, including Milton, the Prime Hook National Wildlife Refuge, Slaughter Beach, Milford, South Bowers, Bowers Beach, the John Dickinson Plantation and First State Heritage Park in Dover, the Bombay Hook National Wildlife Refuge, Port Penn Interpretive Center, Fort Delaware State Park, and the New Castle Historic District. The byway is also a part of the National Scenic Byways program.

The Delaware State Highway Department recommended that DE 9 along the Delaware Bay and Delaware River be designated a scenic highway as far back as 1965. In 2007, the Route 9 Coastal Heritage Byway was nominated and designated as a Delaware Scenic and Historic Highway. By 2017, the byway was extended south from the Dover area to Lewes. On January 19, 2021, the Delaware Bayshore Byway was designated a National Scenic Byway. A ceremony unveiling the National Scenic Byway designation was held on April 22, 2021, with Governor John Carney, DelDOT secretary Nicole Majeski, and other officials in attendance.

=== Harriet Tubman Underground Railroad Byway ===
Harriet Tubman Underground Railroad Byway
- Location: Sandtown–Centerville
- Length: 95 mi (153 km)

The Harriet Tubman Underground Railroad Byway runs from the Maryland border in Sandtown north to the Pennsylvania border in Centerville. At the Maryland border, it connects with the Harriet Tubman Underground Railroad Byway of the Maryland Scenic Byways system, which is designated an All-American Road. From the Maryland border, the byway follows DE 10 between the Maryland border and Camden, US 13 between Camden through Dover to Smyrna, DE 15 from the Smyrna area to Middletown, DE 9 from Odessa to Wilmington, and DE 52 from Wilmington to the Pennsylvania border. The byway provides access to sites related to the Underground Railroad, including the Camden Friends Meetinghouse in Camden; Wildcat Manor near Dover; Blackbird State Forest; the Odessa Historic District which includes the Appoquinimink Friends Meetinghouse and Corbit-Sharp House; the New Castle Court House Museum in New Castle; the Tubman-Garrett Riverfront Park, the Thomas Garrett House, Old Town Hall, Friends Meetinghouse, and Quaker Hill Historic District in Wilmington; and Centreville Village.

The byway was nominated in 2009 by the Underground Railroad Coalition of Delaware and the National Park Service's National Underground Railroad Network to Freedom. The byway was designated by 2010. In 2011, focus group meetings were held for the byway's corridor management plan, which was completed in 2012.

=== Historic Lewes Byway, Gateway to the Bayshore ===
Historic Lewes Byway, Gateway to the Bayshore
- Location: Lewes
- Length: 12.35 mi (19.88 km)

The Historic Lewes Byway, Gateway to the Bayshore (formerly Lewes, Gateway to the Nation Byway and Lewes Byway) runs through Lewes on Pilottown Road/First Street, Gills Neck Road, New Road, Kings Highway, Cape Henlopen Drive, and Savannah Road. The byway provides access to many natural and historical sites in Lewes, including Cape Henlopen State Park, the Cape May-Lewes Ferry, the Zwaanendael Museum, the Lewes Historic District, Lightship Overfalls, the de Vries Monument, Canary Creek, and the Kings Highway Historic District.

The Lewes Byway was approved as a Delaware Scenic and Historic Highway by DelDOT in 2008.

=== Nanticoke Heritage Byway ===
Nanticoke Heritage Byway
- Location: Seaford–Laurel
- Length: 35 mi (56 km)

The Nanticoke Heritage Byway (formerly Western Sussex Byway) runs along several roads in western Sussex County, beginning at US 13 north of Seaford and passing through Seaford, Bethel, and Laurel before ending at Trap Pond State Park. The byway passes many natural and historical sites including the Maston House; the Hearn and Rawlins Mill; the Ross Mansion and Plantation, Downtown Seaford, Seaford Museum, Seaford Railroad Station, DuPont Nylon Plant, Nanticoke River, and Chapel Branch Nature Trail in Seaford; the Woodland Ferry across the Nanticoke River southwest of Seaford; the Broad Creek in Bethel; the Cook House in Laurel; and Old Christ Church east of Laurel.

The Western Sussex Byway was nominated to be a Delaware Scenic and Historic Highway in 2009. The designation was approved by DelDOT in 2010.

=== Red Clay Scenic Byway ===
Red Clay Scenic Byway
- Location: Red Clay Creek valley
- Length: 27 mi (43 km)

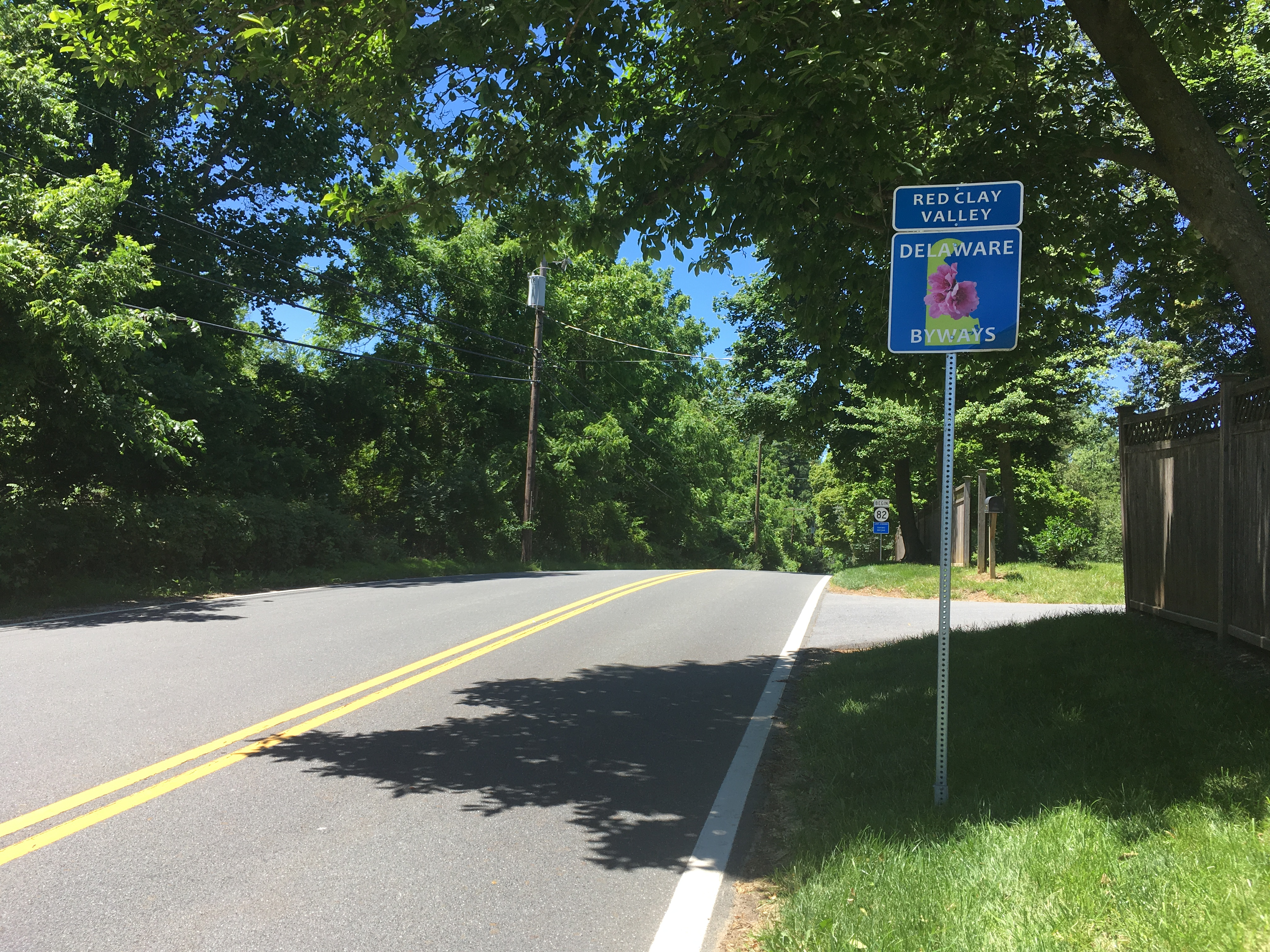
Red Clay Scenic Byway along DE 82 near Greenville

The Red Clay Scenic Byway (formerly Red Clay Valley Byway) consists of 28 roads in the Red Clay Creek valley between DE 48 and DE 52. The byway provides access to many sites including the Garrett Snuff Mill in Yorklyn, the Wilmington and Western Railroad between Greenbank and Hockessin, the Ashland Nature Center, the Mt. Cuba Center, Auburn Valley State Park, and the Ashland and Wooddale covered bridges.

The Red Clay Valley Byway was nominated to be a scenic byway by the Delaware Nature Society and its partners in July 2004; it was designated a Delaware Scenic and Historic Highway on April 5, 2005.
