= Seaford station =

Seaford station may refer to:

- Seaford railway station (England), a railway station in Seaford, East Sussex, United Kingdom
- Seaford railway station, Adelaide, a railway station in Adelaide, Australia
- Seaford railway station, Melbourne, a railway station in Melbourne, Australia
- Seaford (LIRR station), a railway station in New York, United States
- Seaford Station Complex, a monument in Delaware, United States
