= List of television stations in Delaware =

This is a list of broadcast television stations that are licensed in the U.S. state of Delaware. The state is served by four media markets in adjacent states: Philadelphia in Pennsylvania; Salisbury and Baltimore in Maryland; and Washington, D.C.

== Full-power ==
- Stations are arranged by media market served and channel position.

Full-power television stations in Delaware
Media market	Station	Channel	Primary affiliation(s)	Notes	Refs
~Salisbury, Maryland	WMDE	36	Various subchannel networks	(Note: Licensed to Dover, Delaware.)	
~Salisbury, Maryland	WDPB	64	PBS	(Note: Licensed to Seaford, Delaware.) (Note: Satellite of WHYY-TV.)	
~Philadelphia	WDPN-TV	2	MeTV	(Note: Licensed to Wilmington, Delaware.)	
~Philadelphia	WHYY-TV	12	PBS		
~Philadelphia	WPPX-TV	61	Ion Television		

== Low-power ==
Low-power television stations in Delaware
Media market	Station	Channel	Primary affiliation(s)	Notes	Refs
~Salisbury, Maryland	W14DK-D	14	Local programming	(Note: Licensed to Dagsboro, Delaware.)	

== Defunct ==
- WVUE Wilmington (1949–1958)

== See also ==
- Delaware § Media
  - List of newspapers in Delaware
  - List of radio stations in Delaware
  - Media of locales in Delaware: Dover, Wilmington
