= Harriet Tubman Underground Railroad Scenic Byway =

Harriet Tubman Underground Railroad Scenic Byway may refer to:

- Harriet Tubman Underground Railroad Byway (Delaware), part of the Delaware Byways system
- Harriet Tubman Underground Railroad Scenic Byway (Maryland), part of the Maryland Scenic Byways system
