= Resurrection Manor =

Historic house in Maryland, United States

Coordinates: 38°20′17″N 76°30′34″W

- Formerly listed on the U.S. National Register of Historic Places
- Former U.S. National Historic Landmark
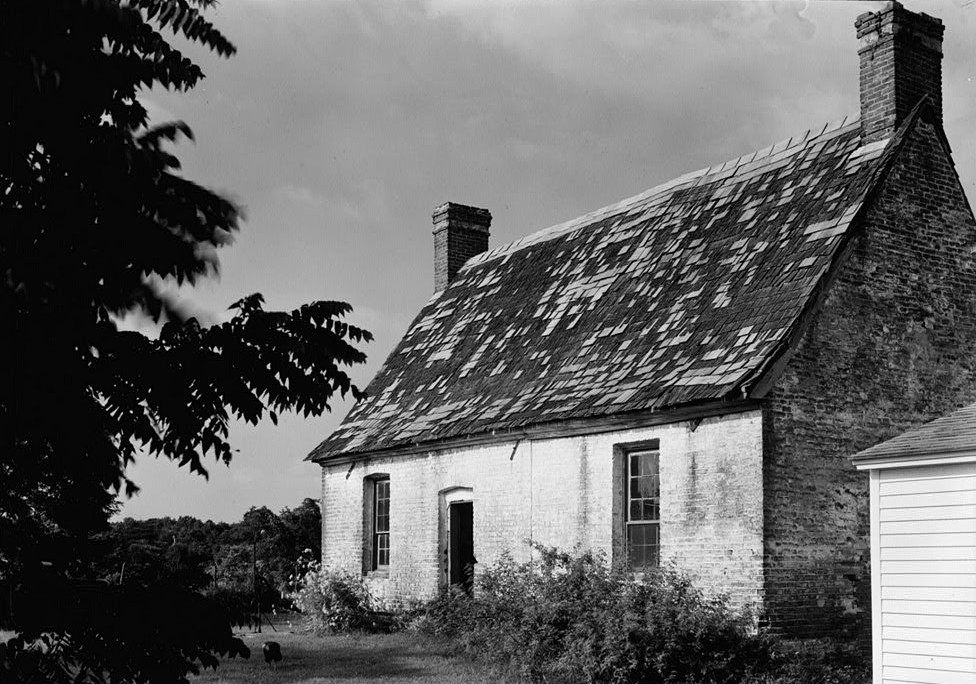

- Location within Maryland Location within the United States
- Location: 45270 Daniels Road; Hollywood, Maryland
- NRHP reference No.: 70000855

Significant dates
- Designated NHL: April 15, 1970
- Removed from NRHP: February 17, 2006
- Delisted NHL: February 17, 2006

Resurrection Manor was a historic home located near Hollywood, St. Mary's County, Maryland, United States. It was built amidst a 4,000-acre (16 km^{2}) farm granted to Thomas Cornwaleys in 1650. It was an example of early brick architecture in the United States dating from about 1660 to 1720. It was originally built as a one-room house with a steep stair leading to the garret. A 1½-story addition was added to the house, transforming its footprint into a hall-and-parlor configuration.

Resurrection Manor was listed as a National Historic Landmark in 1970. In 2002, the house was demolished to make room for a single-family home; National Historic Landmark designation for Resurrection Manor was withdrawn on February 17, 2006.

== See also ==
- Maston House
