= Edgar and Rachel Ross House =

Historic house in Delaware, United States

- U.S. National Register of Historic Places
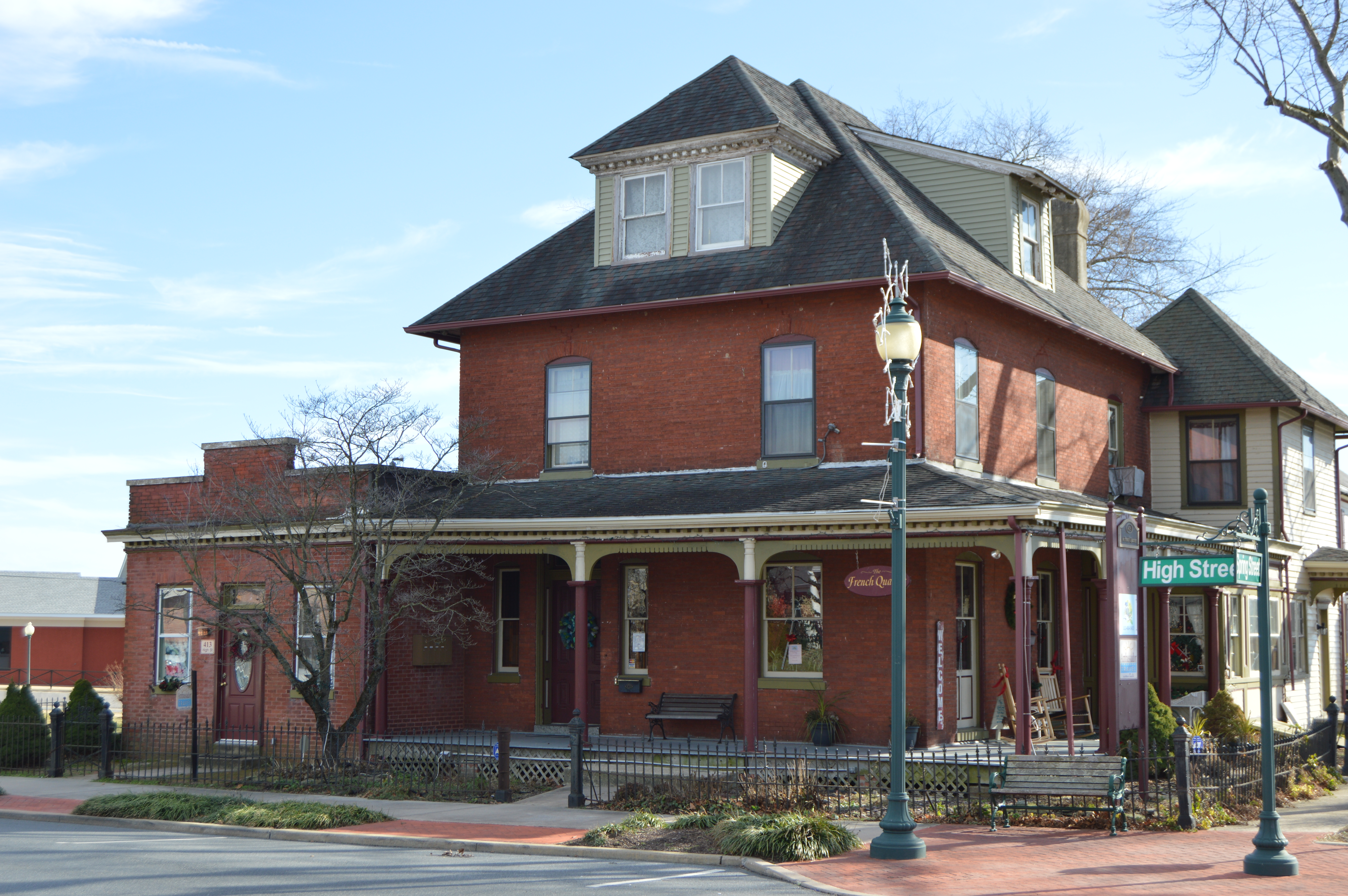
- Front and western side of the house

- Location within Delaware Location within the United States
- Location: 413 High St., Seaford, Delaware
- Coordinates: 38°38′36″N 75°36′36″W
- Area: Less than 1 acre (0.40 ha)
- Built: 1894-1897
- Architectural style: Late Victorian, Bungalow/craftsman, Colonial Revival
- NRHP reference No.: 97001118
- Added to NRHP: September 11, 1997

Edgar and Rachel Ross House is a historic home located at Seaford, Sussex County, Delaware. It was built between 1894 and 1897, and is a 2 1/2-story, brick and frame dwelling in the American Foursquare style. It has a hipped roof with dormers, one-story wraparound porch with Colonial Revival-style columns, and two-story frame ell with a gable roof added between 1897 and 1904.

It was added to the National Register of Historic Places in 1997.
