= Building at High and Cannon Streets =

- U.S. National Register of Historic Places
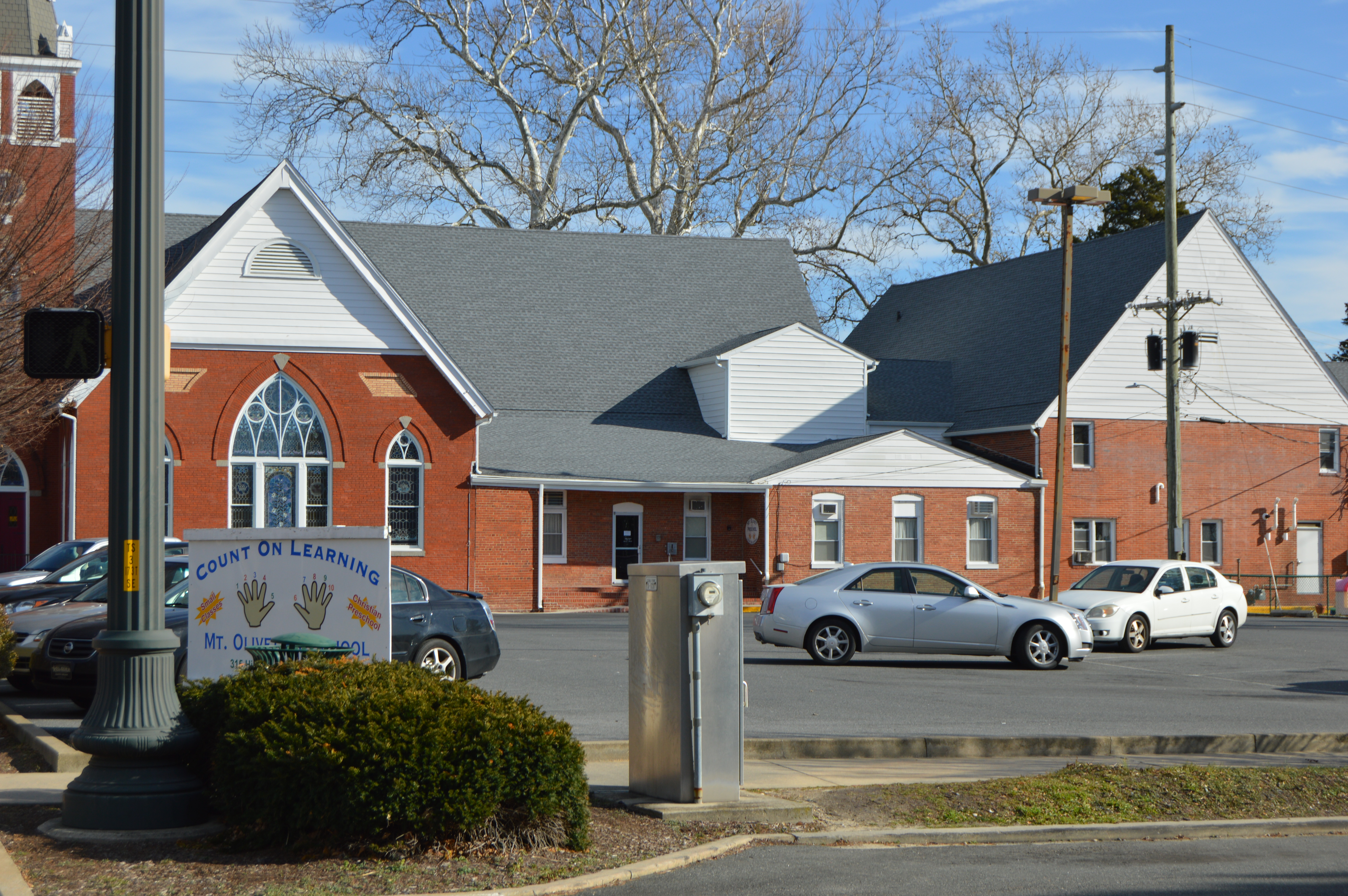
- Site of the building

- Location within Delaware Location within the United States
- Location: SE corner of High and Cannon Sts., Seaford, Delaware
- Coordinates: 38°38′27″N 75°36′42″W
- Area: 0.3 acres (0.12 ha)
- Built: 1885
- MPS: Seaford Commercial Buildings TR
- NRHP reference No.: 86002985
- Added to NRHP: February 18, 1987

The Building at High and Cannon Streets was a historic commercial building located at Seaford, Sussex County, Delaware. It was built about 1885 and was a two-story, ten-bay, flat-roofed frame structure sheathed in pressed tin and asphalt brick-like siding. The original showcase windows and recessed doorways revealed that the building was originally divided into several stores.

It was added to the National Register of Historic Places in 1987.
