= Building at 200–202A High Street =

- U.S. National Register of Historic Places
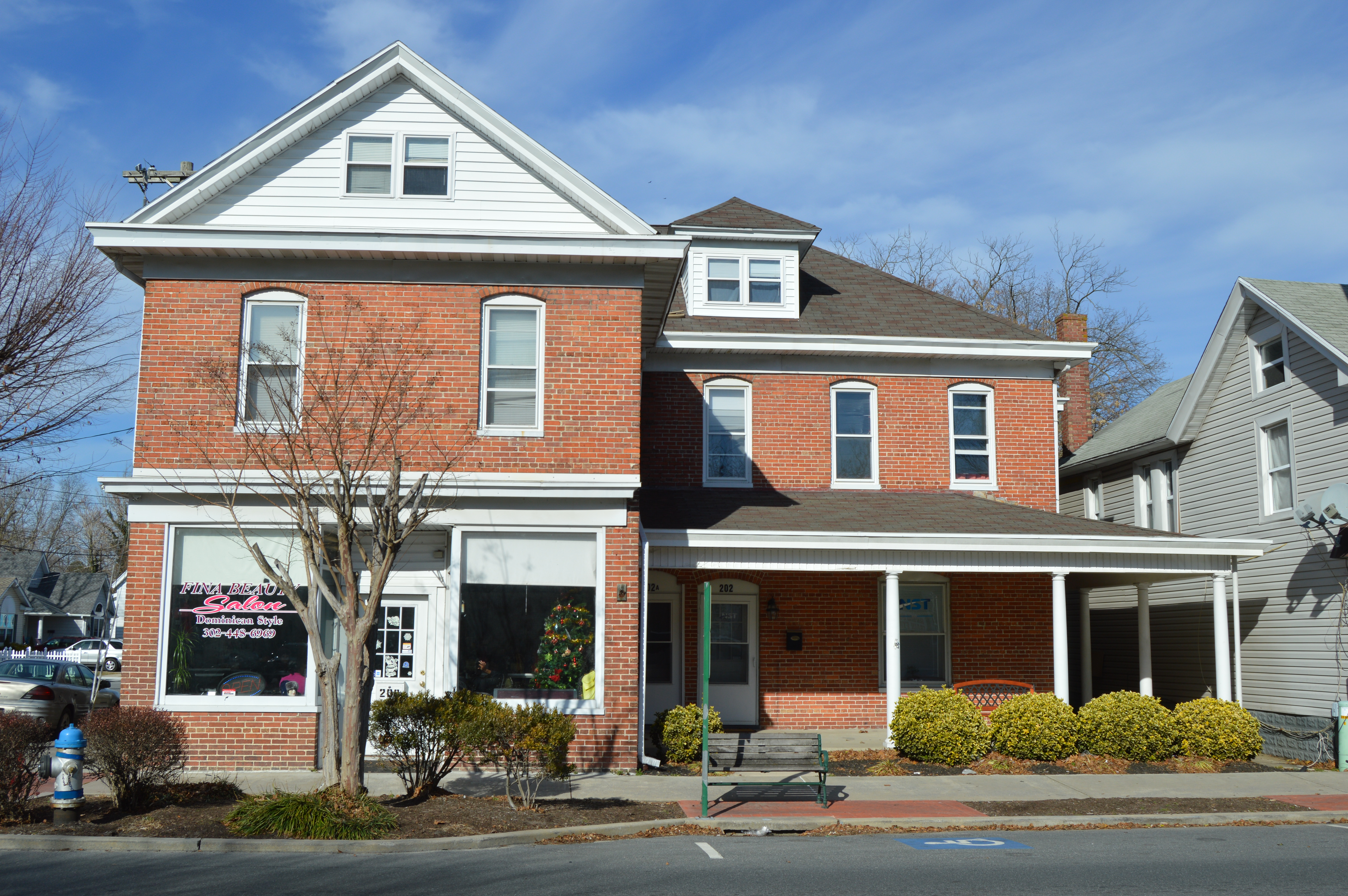
- Front of the building

- Location within Delaware Location within the United States
- Location: 200–202A High St., Seaford, Delaware
- Coordinates: 38°38′26″N 75°36′47″W
- Area: 0.3 acres (0.12 ha)
- Built: 1910
- MPS: Seaford Commercial Buildings TR
- NRHP reference No.: 86002981
- Added to NRHP: February 18, 1987

Building at 200–202A High Street is a historic store and dwelling located at Seaford, Sussex County, Delaware. It was built about 1910, and is a 2 1/2-story, seven-bay, L-shaped brick structure. The front section has a gable roof and the rear section a hipped roof. It is typical of the stores with attached dwellings that were located along High Street.

It was added to the National Register of Historic Places in 1987.
