= J. W. Cox Dry Goods Store =

- U.S. National Register of Historic Places
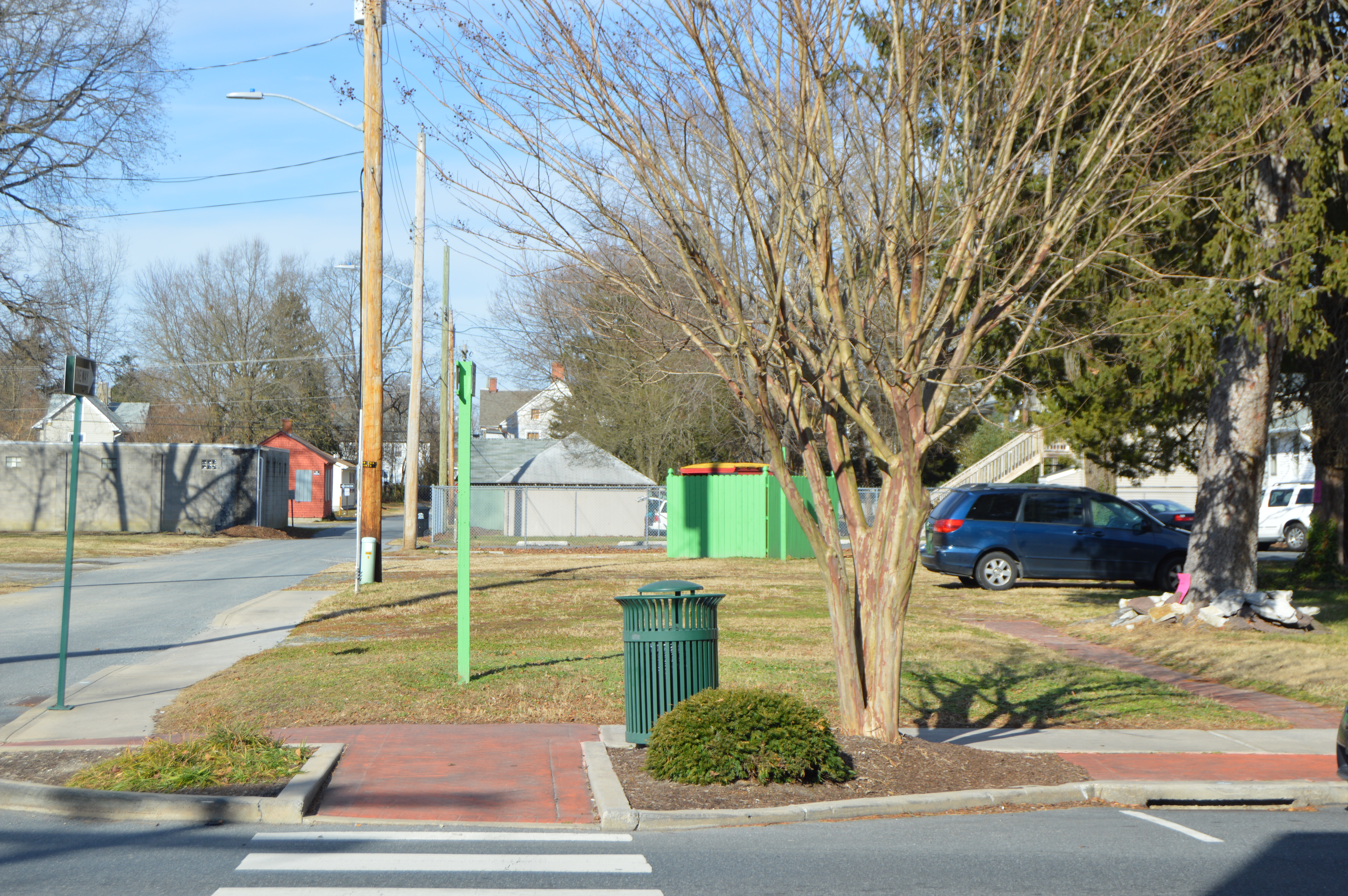
- Site of the store

- Location within Delaware Location within the United States
- Location: 214 High St., Seaford, Delaware
- Coordinates: 38°38′27″N 75°36′44″W
- Area: 0.3 acres (0.12 ha)
- Built: 1885
- MPS: Seaford Commercial Buildings TR
- NRHP reference No.: 86002982
- Added to NRHP: February 18, 1987

The J. W. Cox Dry Goods Store was a historic commercial building located at Seaford, Sussex County, Delaware. It was built about 1885, and was a two-story, four-bay, frame structure with a front gable roof. It had commercial space in the front and living space in the rear. It featured its original showcase windows and doors.

It was added to the National Register of Historic Places in 1987.
