= Sussex National Bank of Seaford =

- U.S. National Register of Historic Places
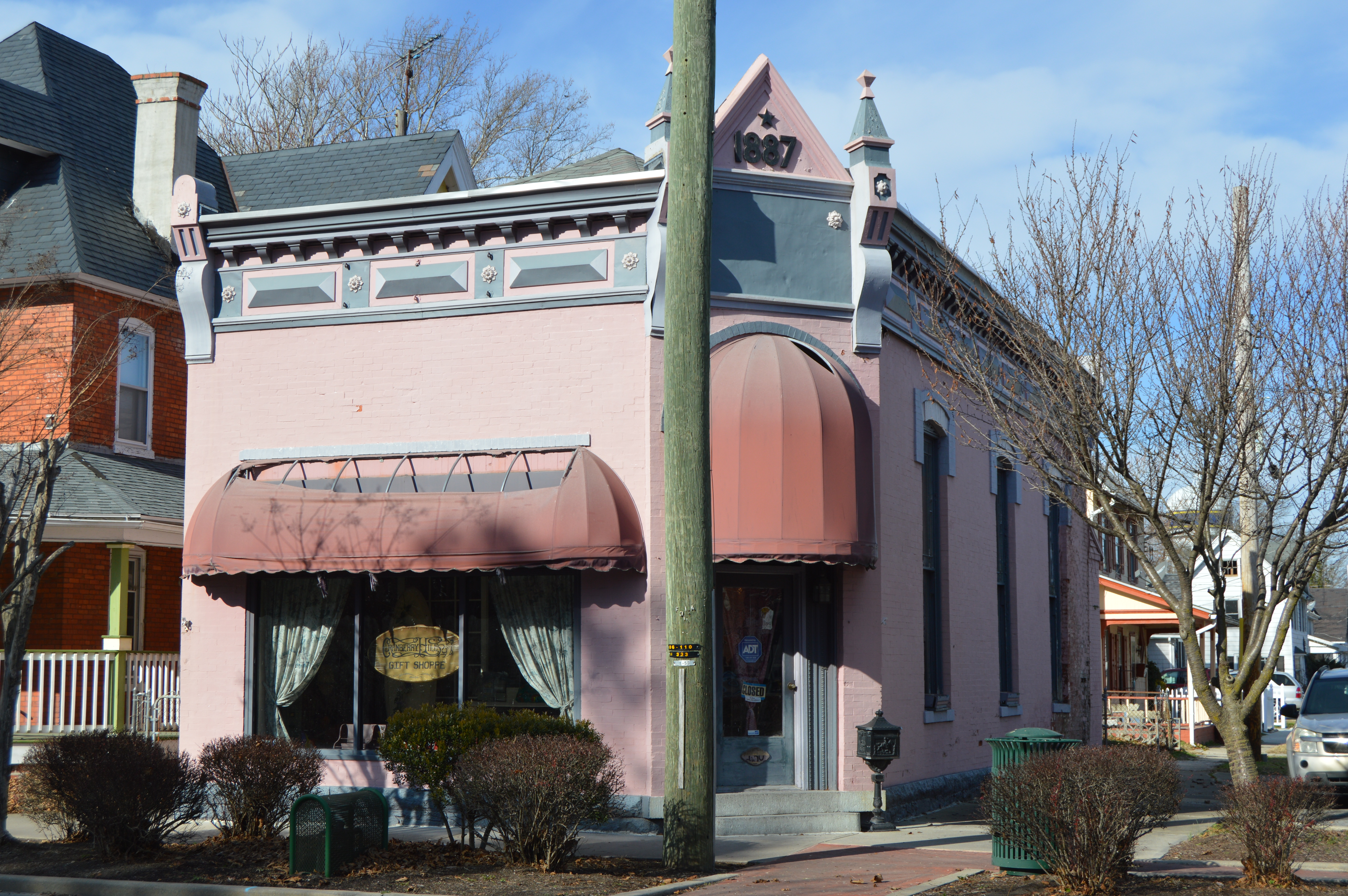
- Front and eastern side of the bank

- Location within Delaware Location within the United States
- Location: 130 High St., Seaford, Delaware
- Coordinates: 38°38′26″N 75°36′49″W
- Area: 0.3 acres (0.12 ha)
- Built: 1887
- MPS: Seaford Commercial Buildings TR
- NRHP reference No.: 86002977
- Added to NRHP: February 18, 1987

Sussex National Bank of Seaford is a historic bank building located at Seaford, Sussex County, Delaware. It was built in 1887, and is a one-story, two-bay, rectangular brick structure with a low hipped roof. It features an elaborate brick cornice, showcase window, spires and gable, and brick work detail.

It was added to the National Register of Historic Places in 1987.
