= Hyde Run (Red Clay Creek tributary) =

Stream in Delaware, USA

Hyde Run Tributary to Red Clay Creek
- Location of Hyde Run mouth Hyde Run (Red Clay Creek tributary) (the United States)

Location
- Country: United States
- State: Delaware
- County: New Castle

Physical characteristics
- Source: divide between Hyde Run and Mill Creek
  - location: pond in Stuyvesant Hills, Delaware
  - coordinates: 39°46′43″N 075°39′44″W
  - elevation: 325 ft (99 m)
- Mouth: Red Clay Creek
  - location: Faulkland, Delaware
  - coordinates: 39°44′38″N 075°38′01″W
  - elevation: 60 ft (18 m)
- Length: 1.94 mi (3.12 km)
- Basin size: 2.54 square miles (6.6 km^{2})
- Discharge
  - location: Red Clay Creek
  - average: 3.67 cu ft/s (0.104 m^{3}/s) at mouth with Red Clay Creek

Basin features
- Progression: Red Clay Creek → White Clay Creek → Christina River → Delaware River → Delaware Bay → Atlantic Ocean
- River system: Christina River
- Tributaries
  - left: Coffee Run
  - right: unnamed tributaries
- Bridges: Old Wilmington Road, Longbow Terrace, Lancaster Pike, Westgate Drive, Ambleside Drive, Cheltenham Road, Hercules Road, DE 41. Faulkland Road, DE 41

Hyde Run is a 1.94 mi (3.12 km) long 1st order tributary to Red Clay Creek in New Castle County, Delaware.

== Variant names ==
According to the Geographic Names Information System, it has also been known historically as:

- Clark's Run
- Hyde's Run

== Course ==
Hyde Run rises in a pond in Stuyvesant Hills, Delaware on the Mill Creek divide in New Castle County, Delaware. Hyde Run then flows southeast to meet Red Clay Creek at Faulkland in Brandywine Springs Park.

== Watershed ==
Hyde Run drains 2.54 square miles (6.6 km^{2}) of area, receives about 46.5 in/year of precipitation, has a topographic wetness index of 430.32 and is about 16% forested.

== See also ==
- List of Delaware rivers
