= First National Bank of Seaford =

- U.S. National Register of Historic Places
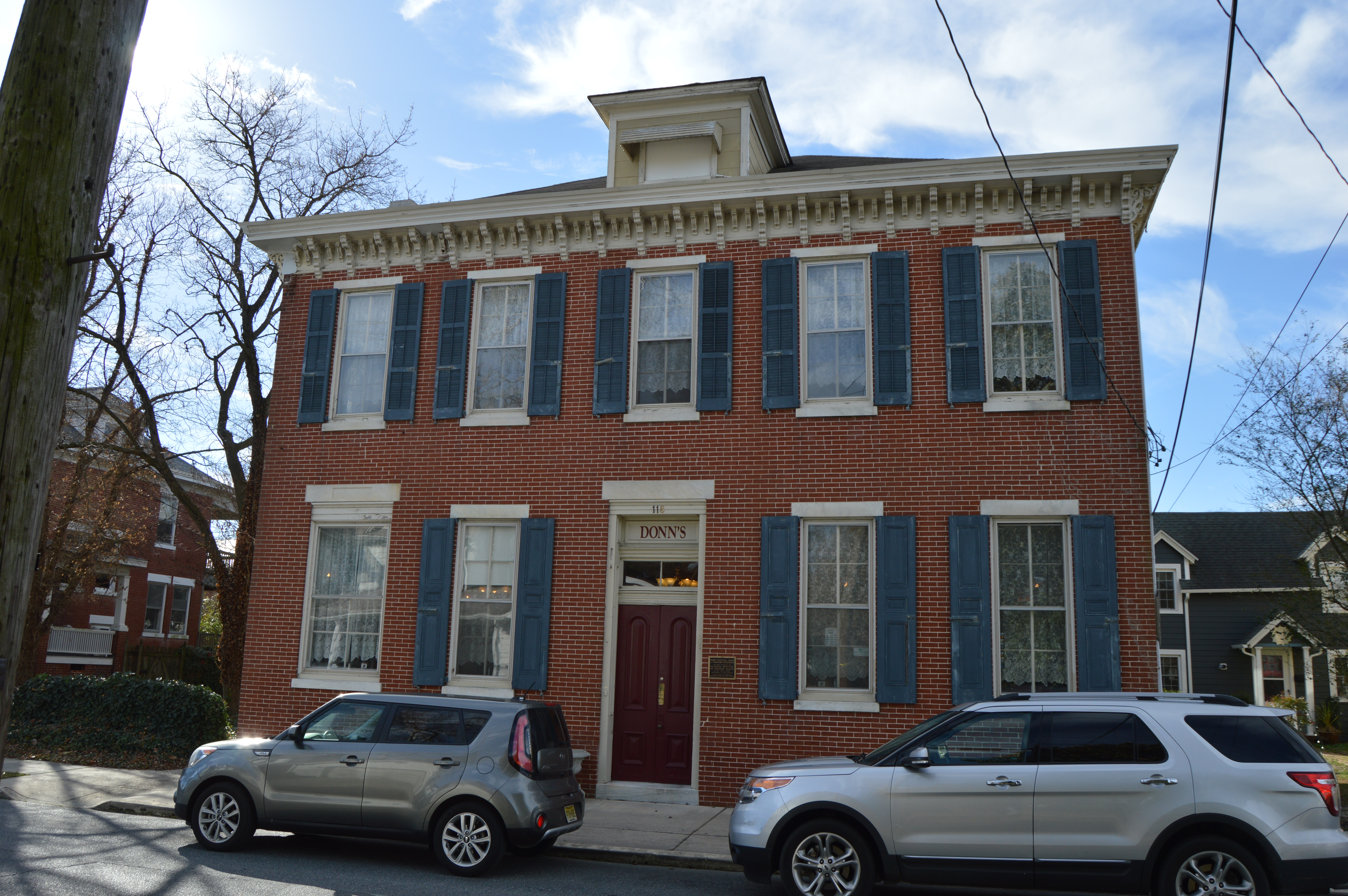
- Front of the bank

- Location within Delaware Location within the United States
- Location: 118 Pine St., Seaford, Delaware
- Coordinates: 38°38′31″N 75°36′44″W
- Area: 0.3 acres (0.12 ha)
- Built: 1868
- Architectural style: Italianate
- MPS: Seaford Commercial Buildings TR
- NRHP reference No.: 86002972
- Added to NRHP: February 18, 1987

First National Bank of Seaford is a historic bank building located at Seaford, Sussex County, Delaware, United States. It was built in 1868, and is a two-story, five-bay, rectangular brick structure in the Italianate style. It has a hipped roof with dormers and a two-story, frame addition. It is the oldest standing bank building in Seaford and has been converted to apartments.

It was added to the National Register of Historic Places in 1987.
