= Lawrence (Seaford, Delaware) =

Historic house in Delaware, United States

- U.S. National Register of Historic Places
- Location within Delaware Location within the United States
- Location: North of Seaford on U.S. Route 13A, near Seaford, Delaware
- Coordinates: 38°39′43″N 75°36′4″W
- Area: 2 acres (0.81 ha)
- Built: c. 1840
- NRHP reference No.: 78000929
- Added to NRHP: May 22, 1978

Lawrence was a historic home located in what is now Seaford, Sussex County, Delaware. It was built about 1840 in what was then a rural area, as a three-story, three-bay, frame structure with a gable roof. It has a rear service wing. It featured a front portico supported by four square columns. Original details, including hardware, flooring, trim, and landscaping, survived throughout the house and grounds.

It was added to the National Register of Historic Places in 1978. It is listed on the Delaware Cultural and Historic Resources GIS system as destroyed.
