= Building at 218 High Street =

Historic house in Delaware, United States

- U.S. National Register of Historic Places
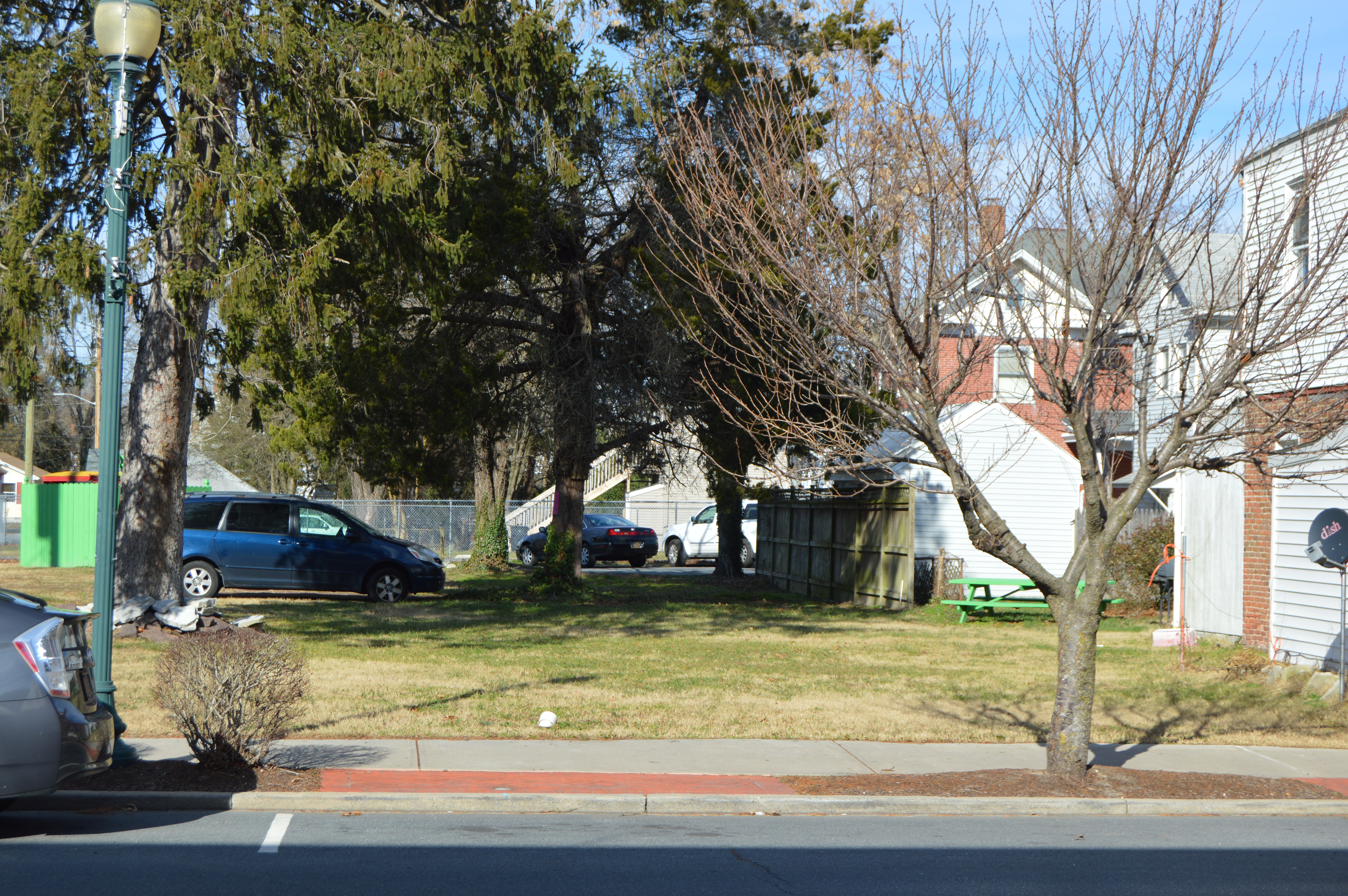
- Site of the building

- Location within Delaware Location within the United States
- Location: 218 High St., Seaford, Delaware
- Coordinates: 38°38′28″N 75°36′44″W
- Area: 0.3 acres (0.12 ha)
- Built: c. 1885 c. 1910
- MPS: Seaford Commercial Buildings TR
- NRHP reference No.: 86002983
- Added to NRHP: February 18, 1987

Building at 218 High Street is a historic store and dwelling located in Seaford, Sussex County, Delaware, United States. It was built about 1885, and is a two-story, two bay structure with a gable roof. It features a multipaned showcase window on the front facade. It was built as a residence and was converted to commercial use about 1910.

It was added to the National Register of Historic Places in 1987.
