= The Breakwater Light =

Defunct American newspaper

The Breakwater Light / The Delaware Pilot
- Devoted to the Best Interest of Lewes
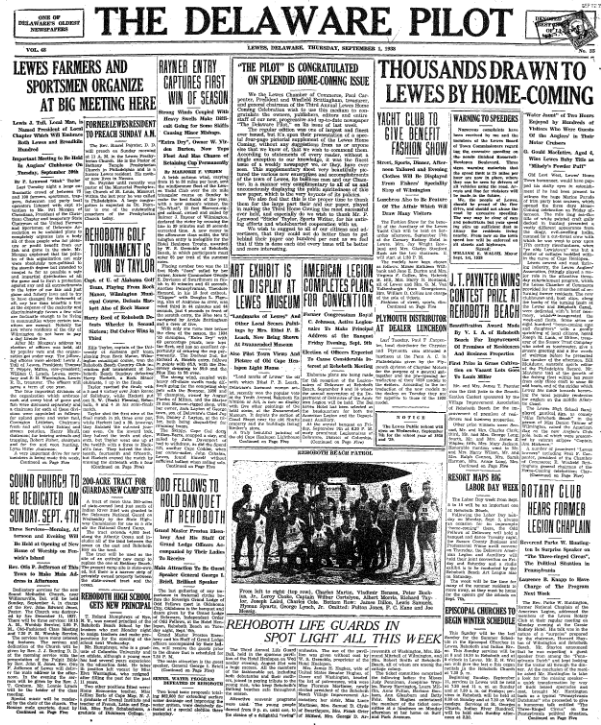
- September 1, 1938 edition
- Type: Weekly, semi-weekly
- Owner(s): I. H. D. Knowles (The Breakwater Light); Ebe W. Tunnell (The Delaware Pilot)
- Founder: I. H. D. Knowles
- Publisher: I. H. D. Knowles (The Breakwater Light); Horace Greeley Knowles (The Breakwater Light); Delaware Pilot Publishing Company (The Delaware Pilot); Sussex Printing & Publishing Company (The Delaware Pilot)
- Names: The Breakwater Light (1871–1890); The Delaware Pilot (1891–1920, 1938–1940s)
- Founded: 1871
- Ceased publication: 1920, c. 1942
- Relaunched: 1938
- Political alignment: Republican (Note: The History of the State of Delaware, from the Earliest Settlements to the Year 1907 by Henry C. Conrad writes that The Breakwater Light was conducted "successfully as a Republican newspaper." However, the History of Delaware: 1609–1888 by John Thomas Scharf states that it was "independent in politics.") (1871–1920); Non-partisan (after 1938)
- Language: English
- City: Lewes, Delaware
- Circulation: 2,400 (as of 1878)

The Breakwater Light, later known as The Delaware Pilot, was an American weekly newspaper based in Lewes, Delaware, United States. It was founded in 1871 by I. H. D. Knowles as the first newspaper in the town's history, and ran under the name Breakwater Light for twenty years. It was sold to future state governor Ebe W. Tunnell in 1891, who renamed it to the Delaware Pilot. It continued under this name before suspending operations in 1920, later returning in 1938 for a few years before disestablishing permanently in c. 1942.

== History ==
=== The Breakwater Light ===
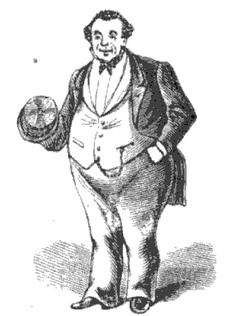
I. H. D. Knowles

The Breakwater Light was founded in 1871 by I. H. D. Knowles, and its first issue was published on August 12 of that year. It was the first paper in the history of Lewes, the "First Town in the First State," and was also the first Republican newspaper in Sussex County. By December, it had become one of the "best local papers on the peninsula," according to an article in Every Evening.

In the 1872 edition of George P. Rowell's American Newspaper Directory, The Breakwater Light was listed as having a circulation of about 350. It was published every Saturday with a "seven-column folio" and each page was 22 inches by 32 inches, with four pages per issue. Subscriptions costed one dollar per year. The number of subscribers increased to 480 in 1873, and went up again to 1,180 (Note: An advertisement in the 1874 American Newspaper Directory stated that the circulation was over 2,000; however, the entry of the paper in the book listed a circulation of 1,180.) the following year, before then dropping down to 800 in 1875, according to the American Newspaper Directory.

An advertisement for The Breakwater Light in the 1874 American Newspaper Directory said the following: "The Light, besides being well filled with fresh local and general news, contains a large amount of shipping intelligence, which cannot fail to make the paper of value to shipmasters of our own and other ports, while its wide circulation renders it an advertising medium of the first-class." An article in the Wilmington Daily Commercial that year wrote that The Breakwater Light "has the happy capacity of always hitting the nail squarely on the head."

The Breakwater Light was listed as having a circulation of 700 in 1876, although an advertisement for it stated that the paper's circulation was over 2,000, writing, "The Light is a live, ably-edited local paper, brimful of news and literature, with a weekly circulation of 2,400." Described as "one of the best advertising mediums in this section," the paper had the following advertisement rates at the time:

- One inch, one insertion: $1.00
- Each additional one-inch insertion: $0.50
- Three inches, one insertion: $2.00
- Each additional three-inch insertion: $1.00
- Eight inches, one insertion: $6.00
- Each additional eight-inch insertion: $3.00

The cost of a subscription rose to $1.50 in 1877, and its circulation decreased to an estimated 600 that year. Most issues of the paper were printed at the house of Daniel Rodney, who had served as Delaware governor, United States Senator from Delaware, and Delaware Representative in the House of Representatives. In Pettingill's Newspaper Directory and Advertisers' Hand-book of 1878, the paper was valued at $3,000 and the circulation was listed as 2,400, while the subscription price returned to $1.00 per year. The subscription cost was raised to $1.50 in 1879, which it remained at until 1884. In 1884, it costed $1.00, but the price was brought back to $1.50 in 1885.

In 1884, Horace Greeley Knowles, the son of the paper's founder and later a United States ambassador, took over as editor and manager of The Breakwater Light. Under his "efficient management," the paper became of great influence to lower Delaware. In the final years of the paper, it was edited by Bordeaux Knowles, which led to the "depreciation of value."

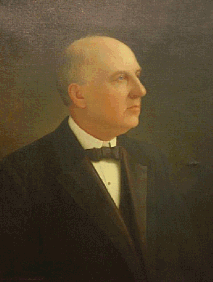
Ebe W. Tunnell, who bought the paper in 1891 and renamed it The Delaware Pilot

=== The Delaware Pilot ===
The Breakwater Light was offered up for sheriff's sale in January 1891, and sold for just $258, being bought by future governor Ebe W. Tunnell, who renamed it The Delaware Pilot. Its first issue was published in June of that year and the Evening Journal reported afterwards, "The Delaware Pilot, a bright, clean and newsy sheet, published every Saturday at Lewes, made its first appearance on Saturday. The Pilot is exactly the size of the Evening Journal and is evidently run on the basis of 'quality not quantity.' Three-fourths of the entire paper is devoted to news, foreign, state, port and local. As a weekly newspaper, the Pilot is a pronounced success. It's principles are Democratic and it is well edited." It started as a six-column paper with four pages, each being 18 inches by 24 inches, and was originally published by the Delaware Pilot Publishing Company, before later being controlled by the Sussex Printing and Publishing Company in Georgetown starting in February 1906.

Around 1895, the head editor of the paper became D. L. Mustard. Subscriptions by that time costed $1.00 each. In 1897, Ebe W. Tunnell became the governor of the state and remained active in The Delaware Pilot, being one of the editorial directors, which led one newspaper to write "...Therefore, when [The Delaware Pilot] speaks on party questions, its words are deserving of careful consideration, for they express, generally or specifically, the opinions of the chief executive of the commonwealth."

In 1901, the Delaware Pilot Publishing Company purchased The Rehoboth Beacon and merged it with The Delaware Pilot, making the paper a semi-weekly. Shortly afterwards, the paper began issuing a supplement, which was received with praise from The Evening Journal, which wrote, "The Delaware Pilot, of Lewes, which is one of the most progressive weeklies in the State, this week issues a supplement which is a great credit to it. The supplement is in pamphlet form, of 28 pages, and is handsomely compiled. It is printed on excellent paper and adorned with fine half-tone cuts of the prominent people and buildings of the various towns of the State. Particular attention in paid to the Sussex county towns of which many true and interesting things are said..."

By 1910, The Delaware Pilot had returned to publishing once per week and its head editor had become Charles F. Wolfe. It had also increased in size from four pages per edition to eight. The 1911 American Newspaper Annual and Directory listed The Delaware Pilot as having a circulation of 900. In the mid-1910s, the paper changed from being issued on Saturdays to being issued on Fridays, while also changing the size of each page to 13 inches by 19 inches. Around 1918, the paper hired R. B. Ingram to replace Wolfe as head editor.

In 1920, James Duffel and A. J. Lynch became head editors of The Delaware Pilot, succeeding Ingram. In June of that year, the paper suspended due to high production costs and because of a paper shortage. Although The Morning News reported that there was a chance it would return the following autumn, it did not, leaving Lewes without a newspaper. In the subsequent years, the only paper regularly covering Lewes was the Delaware Coast News, based in Rehoboth Beach.

After 17 years of Lewes not having a newspaper, The Delaware Pilot was relaunched in June 1938. It was given office space at the Ableman Building on Second Street and was printed on the same press as the Sussex Countian in Georgetown. The first issue stated, "This is a business proposition and not a political one. The policy of the paper will be non-partisan and non-factional. We believe Lewes has a future and a real need for a weekly newspaper." The revived paper lasted until at least 1942 before disestablishing permanently.
