= Faulkland, Delaware =

Unincorporated community in Delaware, United States

- Unincorporated community
- Location within Delaware Location within the United States
- Coordinates: 39°44′51″N 75°38′8″W
- Country: United States
- State: Delaware
- County: New Castle
- Elevation: 98 ft (30 m)
- Time zone: UTC-5 (Eastern (EST))
  - Summer (DST): UTC-4 (EDT)
- Area code: 302
- GNIS feature ID: 213951

Faulkland is an unincorporated community in New Castle County, Delaware, United States, approximately two miles west of Wilmington. Faulkland has only one main road, named Faulkland Road. No post office has ever existed in the very small community. The Wilmington and Western Railroad runs parallel through the area with a level crossing at Faulkland Road. Hyde Run, a Red Clay Creek tributary, runs through the area. The community is a suburban neighborhood that is also near the town of Elsmere, Delaware.

== History ==
Faulkland's population was 300 in 1890, and declined to 281 in 1900.

A newspaper, called The Faulkland Quiz, was published in the community in the year 1892 by John T. Mullins, who also edited the publication.
