= Maston House =

Historic house in Delaware, United States

- U.S. National Register of Historic Places
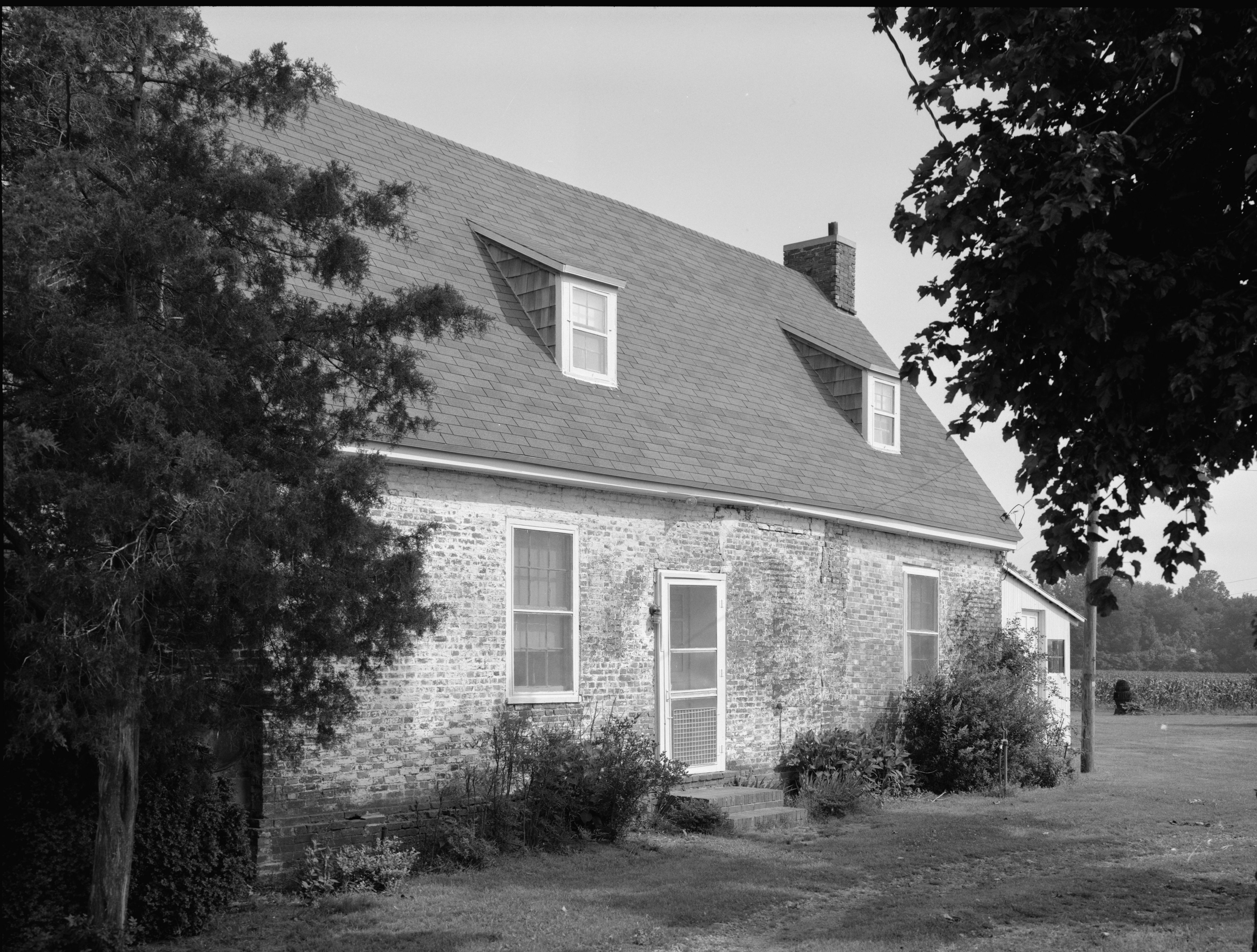
- Cannon's Savannah, HABS Photo, July 1982

- Location within Delaware Location within the United States
- Location: 3 miles north of Seaford on Seaford-Atlanta Rd., near Seaford, Delaware
- Coordinates: 38°41′20″N 75°38′58″W
- Area: 5 acres (2.0 ha)
- Built: 1727, 1733
- Architectural style: Resurrection Manor
- NRHP reference No.: 75000545
- Added to NRHP: March 31, 1975

Maston House, also known as Cannon's Savannah, is a historic home located near Seaford in Sussex County, Delaware. It was built in 1727 and enlarged in 1733. It is a 1 1/2-story, single pile, brick structure with a gable roof in the "Resurrection Manor" style. As such, it resembles Maryland rather than Delaware houses. It has shed-roof dormers. The interior has wide floor boards and a narrow enclosed staircase winding around the chimney. It is one of Sussex County's oldest brick structures. A small frame addition from the 1970s is attached to the northern end.

It was added to the National Register of Historic Places in 1975.
