= Gov. William H. Ross House =

Historic house in Delaware, United States

- U.S. National Register of Historic Places
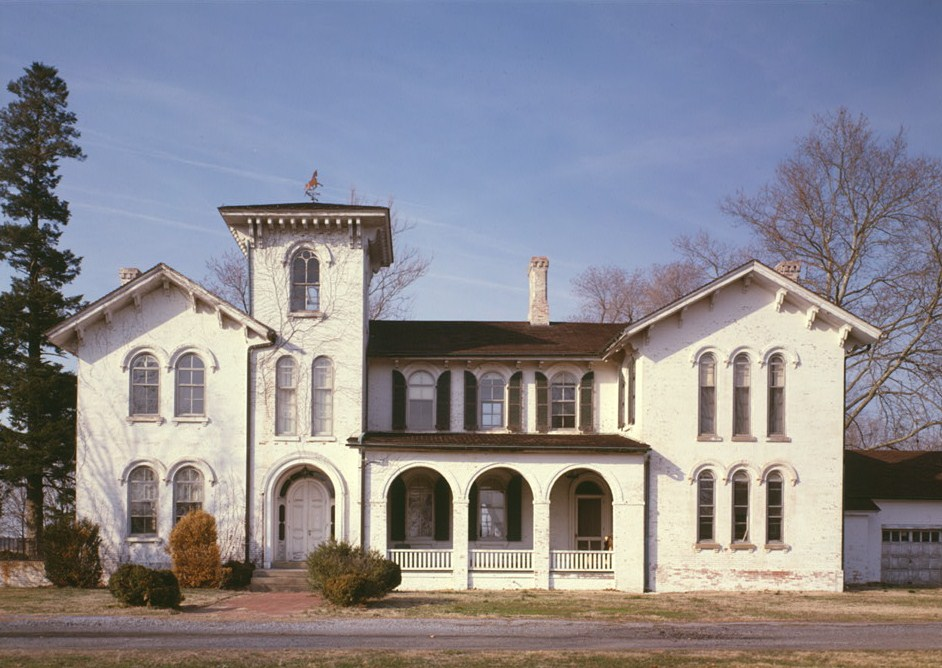
- Gov. William H. Ross House, HABS Photo, July 1982

- Location within Delaware Location within the United States
- Location: North of Seaford on Market St., near Seaford, Delaware
- Coordinates: 38°39′18″N 75°37′05″W
- Area: 11.9 acres (4.8 ha)
- Built: 1859
- Architectural style: Italianate
- NRHP reference No.: 77000399
- Added to NRHP: October 28, 1977

Gov. William H. Ross House, also known as The Ross Mansion, is a historic home located near Seaford, Sussex County, Delaware. It was built in 1859, and is a two-story, brick mansion in three main connected blocks in an "H"-shape. It is in the Italianate style and features a three-story tower in the central space. The interior retains its original plaster mouldings, its Victorian trim, doors, and original inside shutters. It was the home of Delaware Governor William H. H. Ross (1814-1887), who built the home along the railroad he helped to establish.

It was added to the National Register of Historic Places in 1977.

The Seaford Historical Society owns the house and operates it as a pre-Civil War period historic house museum known as the Governor Ross Mansion & Plantation.

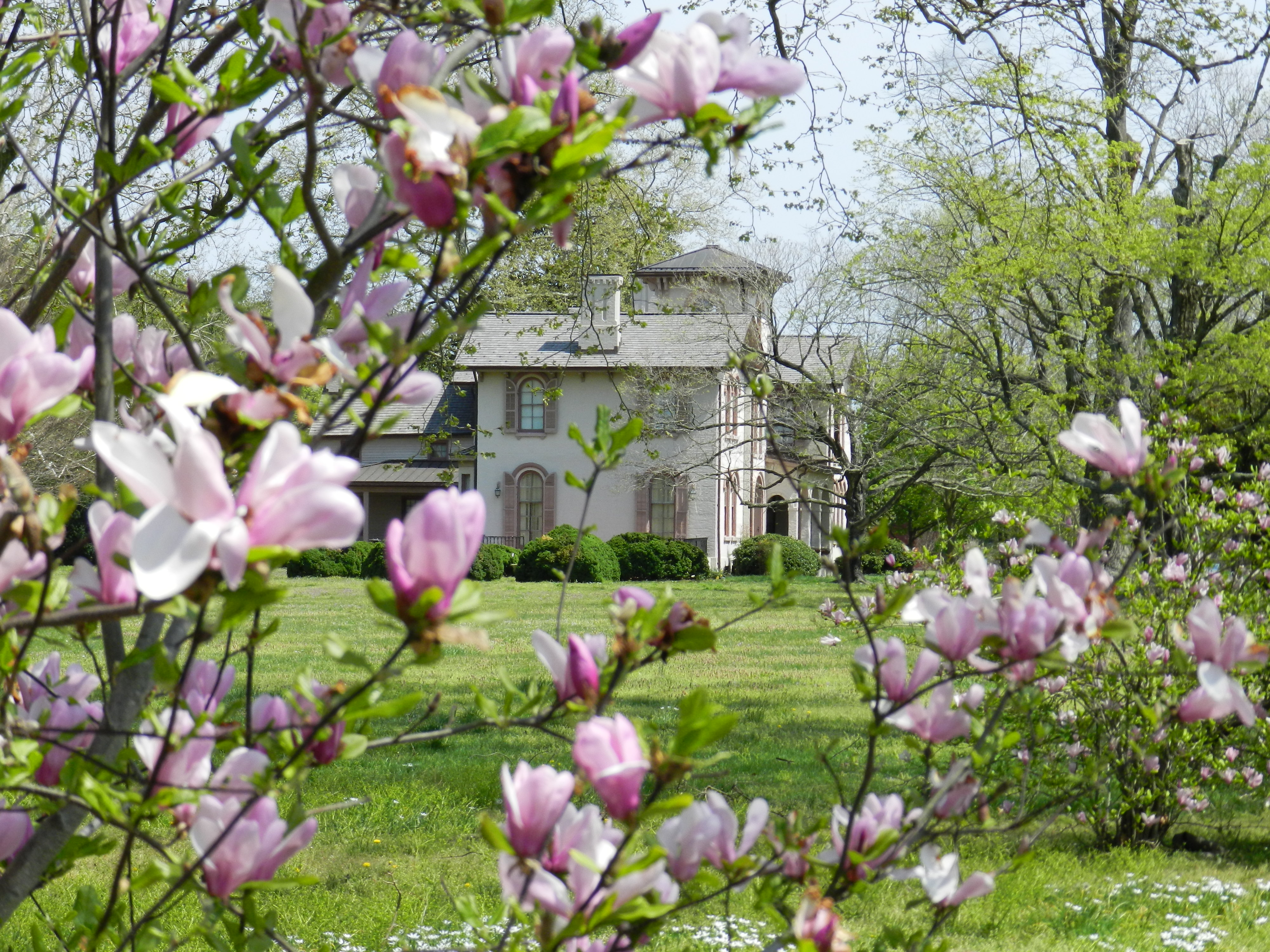
The Gov. Ross Plantation and Mansion, Spring 2017

From the Seaford Historical Society's website: "Purchased by the Seaford Historical Society in 1976, this rare and complete Victorian Italianate mansion, ca. 1850s, has been lovingly restored and fully furnished. ... The Gov. Ross Mansion was built in the 1850s by William Henry Harrison Ross for himself and his family. Ross served as the Democratic Governor of Delaware from 1851 to 1855. Extremely popular with the people, he was instrumental in bringing the railroad into Southern Delaware. Trains running daily to Philadelphia vitalized the economy as farmers switched crops from wheat and corn to higher priced tomatoes, strawberries, peaches and other perishables.

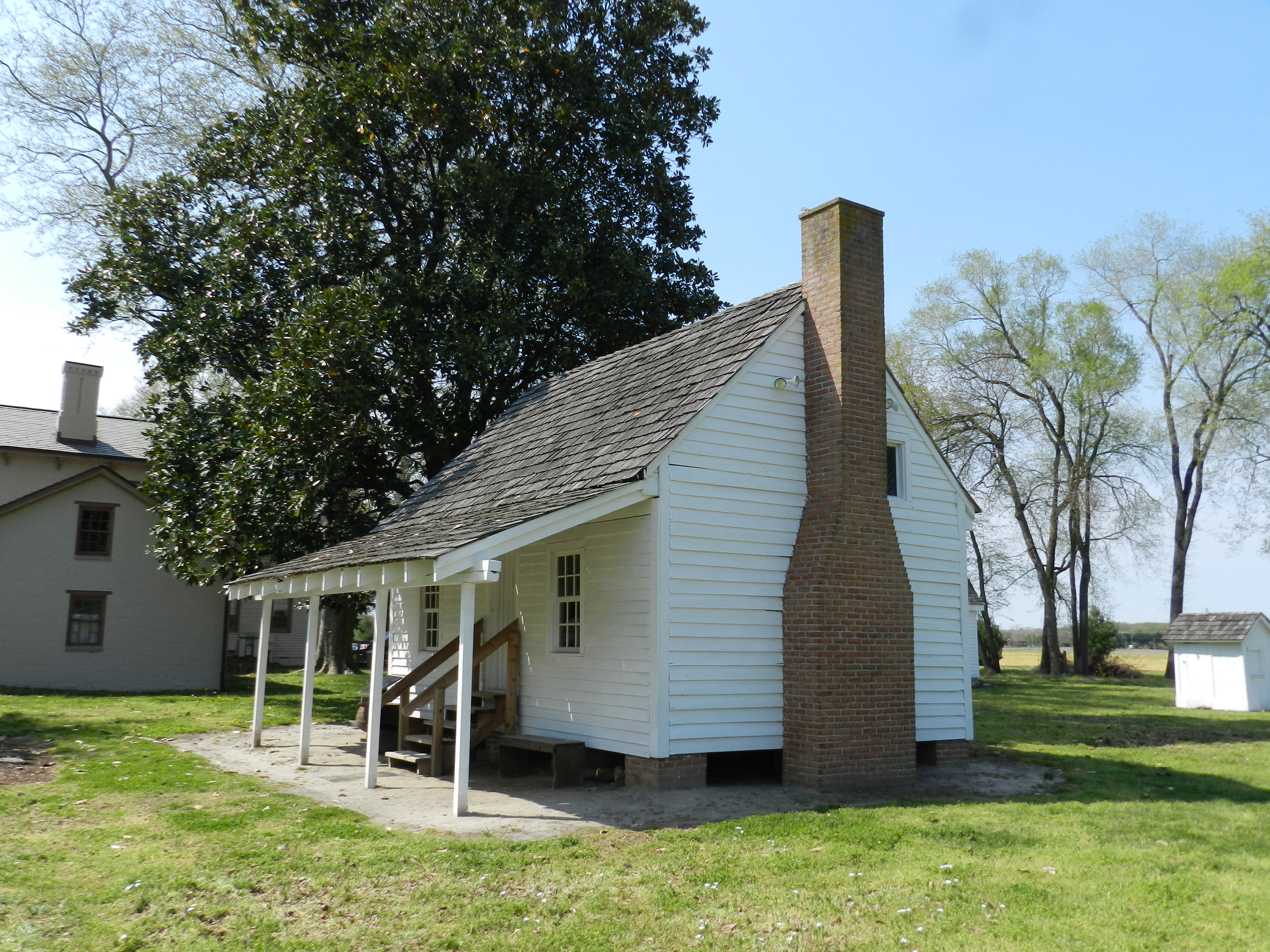
The slave quarters on the Gov. Ross Plantation before roof restoration, Spring of 2017

Ross became a local hero, but he was also a slave owner and Southern sympathizer. When war broke out between the states, Delaware sided with the North. Ross supported the Confederacy, and was forced to England. Today, the Gov. Ross Mansion stands as a reminder of pre-Civil War life." The plantation has the only known slave quarters surviving and documented in Delaware.
