= Hearn and Rawlins Mill =

- U.S. National Register of Historic Places
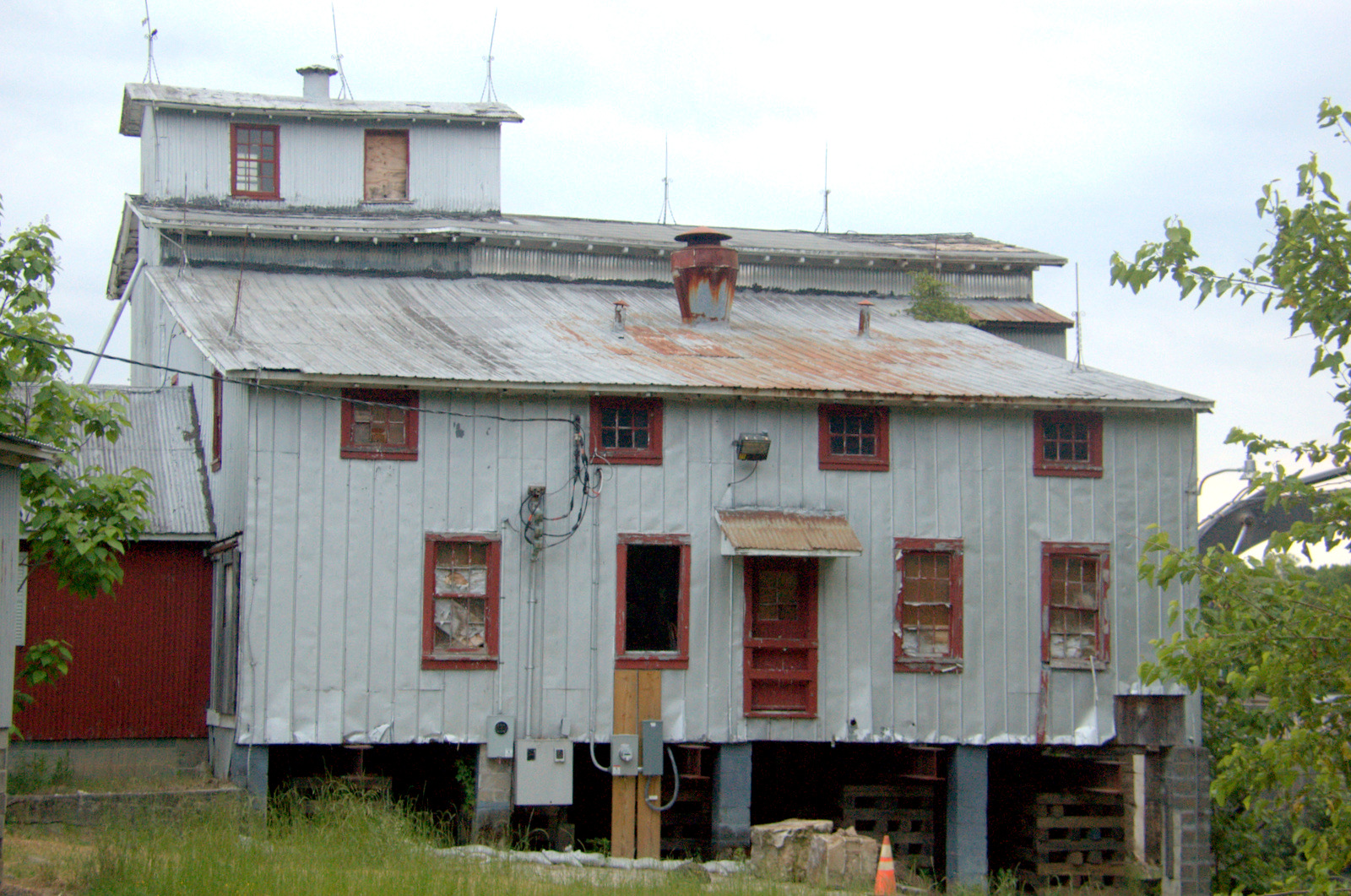

- Location within Delaware Location within the United States
- Location: North of Seaford on Road 13, near Seaford, Delaware
- Coordinates: 38°40′44″N 75°35′39″W
- Area: 1 acre (0.40 ha)
- Built: c. 1880, 1912
- NRHP reference No.: 78000928
- Added to NRHP: May 22, 1978

Hearn and Rawlins Mill, also known as the Cannon and Ross Mill and Hearn Mill, is a historic grist mill complex located near Seaford, Sussex County, Delaware. It was built about 1880, on the site of a previous mill built in 1820. It is a water-powered mill with two overshot wheels installed in 1912. The mill and two associated warehouses are frame buildings, sheathed in metal, on brick footings. They are located on an earthen dam, rebuilt in 1912.

It was added to the National Register of Historic Places in 1978.
