= The Faulkland Quiz =

Defunct American newspaper

- For The Masses...
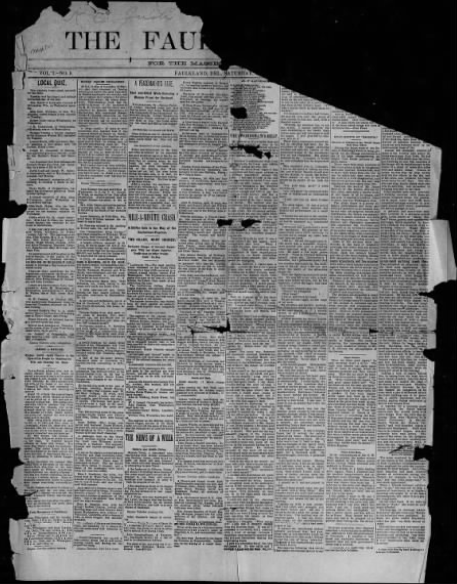
- Front page, June 25, 1892
- Type: Weekly newspaper
- Founder: John T. Mullins
- Founded: 1892
- Ceased publication: c. 1893
- Political alignment: Independent
- Language: English
- City: Faulkland, Delaware
- Country: United States
- Circulation: 1,000 (as of 1893)

The Faulkland Quiz was an American weekly newspaper based in Faulkland, Delaware. It was founded, edited, and published by John T. Mullins and was in operation for at least one year, ceasing publication c. 1893. The paper had a circulation of 1,000 by the beginning of 1893 and its motto included the statement "For The Masses." (Note: Only one surviving edition of The Faulkland Quiz is known to exist, and the part of the motto after "For The Masses" is torn off.)

== History ==
The Quiz was founded in spring of 1892, by John T. Mullins, an 18-year-old resident of Faulkland. Mullins had become interested in the press at a young age and also operated a paper called the Agent's Guide, which was established four years prior to The Quiz. Mullins was both publisher and editor of the paper, which "consisted of a bit of local news, a lot of material taken from national wires, and a fair amount of literary text." The paper was published once each week, on each Saturday, and featured a motto that included the phrase "For The Masses." Subscriptions cost one dollar, and each edition of the newspaper was four pages long.

A Wilmington newspaper wrote in May 1892 about The Quiz, "[it] makes its fourth visit to-day. It improves with each issue and will no doubt be a leading publication of rural New Castle county in a short time." Each issue featured on the front page a section titled "Local Quiz," which discussed local news. It also included sections for news from local Pennsylvania towns as well as talked about top news from other states in the Middle Atlantic area.

Similar to other papers of that period, The Quiz also included news of popular interest and fictional quotes. However, unlike most papers of the time, it also had an illustrated section detailing current women's fashions, with one article writing about the whalebone supply, an item often used in women's clothing of the era. A large number of advertisements were additionally added in the newspaper, many of which were about different remedies for health issues, such as liver complaints, rheumatism, and catarrh. Advertising costed five cents per line for the first insertion, and three cents for each line afterwards.

Little information is known about the history of The Quiz, and it is uncertain when its last issue was published. Delaware historian Scott Palmer guesses that the paper ended when Mullins accepted a position as an editor with the Evening Journal in October 1892; however, The Quiz was listed in the 1893 edition of the American Newspaper Directory, meaning it was probably still in publication by then, although it definitely was finished by September 1894, when Mullins began attending Delaware College (now known as the University of Delaware).
