= Seaford Station Complex =

- U.S. National Register of Historic Places
- U.S. Historic district
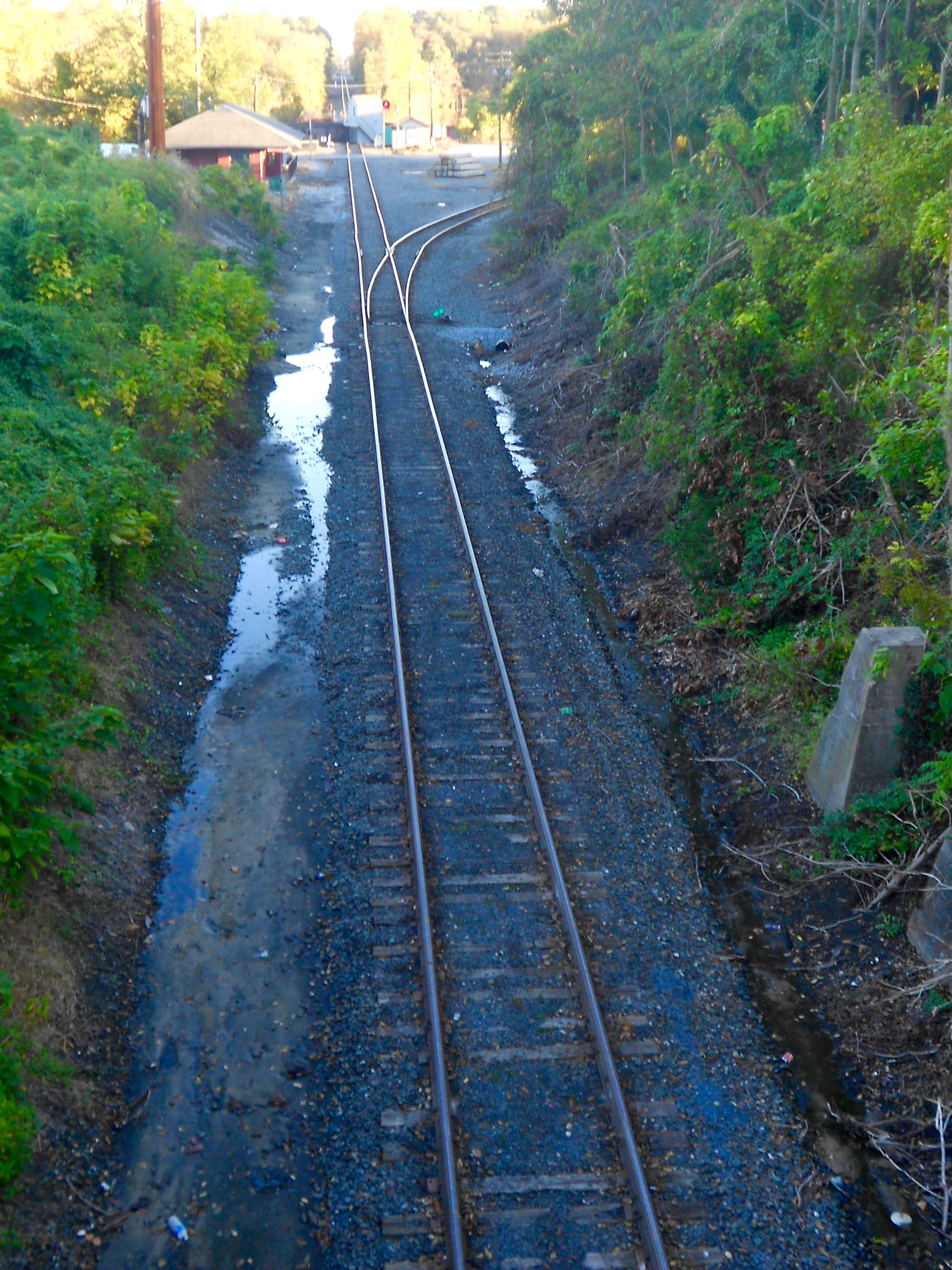
- Tracks leading up to the bridge

- Location within Delaware Location within the United States
- Location: Nanticoke River at Delaware Railroad Bridge, Seaford, Delaware
- Coordinates: 38°38′18″N 75°36′53″W
- Area: 2 acres (0.81 ha)
- Built: 1890, 1905
- Built by: Pencoyd Bridge & Construction Co.
- NRHP reference No.: 78000930
- Added to NRHP: June 15, 1978

Seaford Station Complex is a historic railway station complex and national historic district located at Seaford, Sussex County, Delaware. It includes two contributing buildings and two contributing structures and considered an outstanding example of a turn-of-the-20th century, unaltered, small-town railroad complex in Delaware. They are the Seaford Railroad Station, Seaford Freight Station, the Nanticoke River moveable railroad bridge, and mainline railroad tracks. The Seaford Railroad Station is brick rectangular building with a large bracketed overhang, built about 1905. The Seaford Freight Station was built about the same time, and consists of an open porch, covered by an arcaded extension of the roof, with an office and store room. The Nanticoke River moveable railroad bridge is an iron through-truss structure carrying a single track. It was built about 1890 by the Pencoyd Bridge and Construction Company of Pencoyd, Pennsylvania. The main line track north of the depot was double-tracked just before World War I.

It was added to the National Register of Historic Places in 1978.

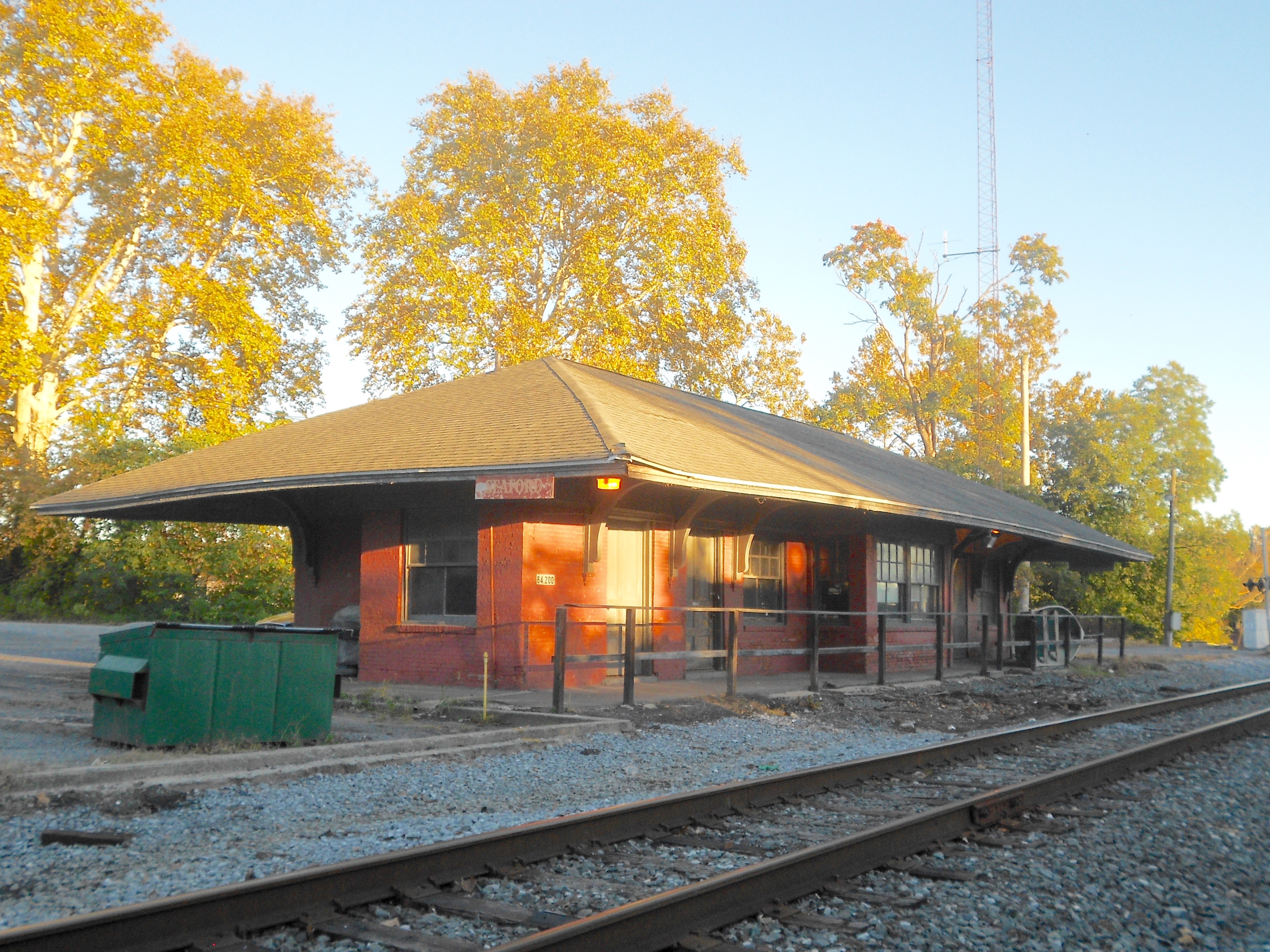

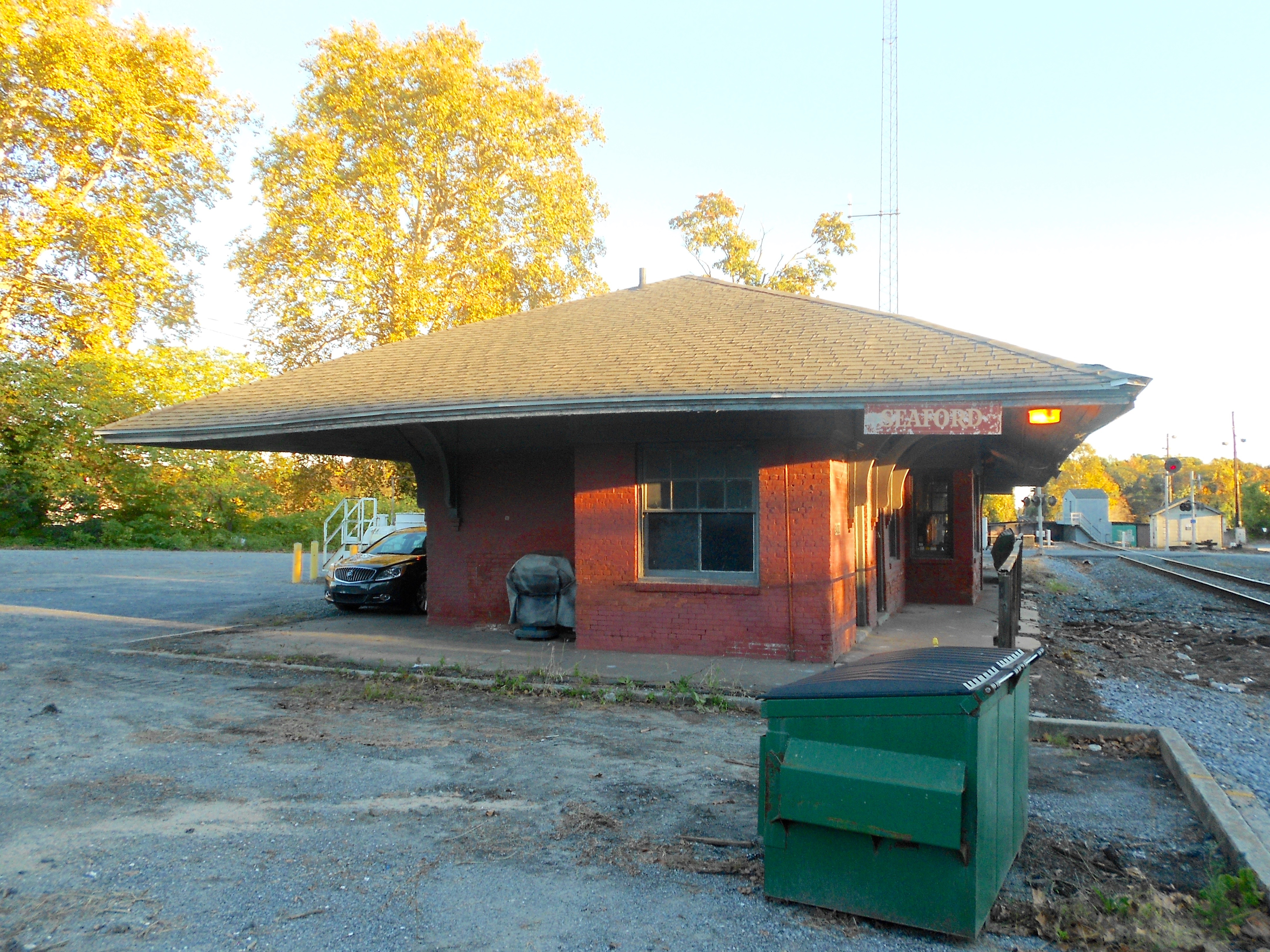

Preceding station	Pennsylvania Railroad	Following station
Laurel toward Cape Charles	Delmarva Division	Cannon toward Wilmington
Oak Grove toward Cambridge	Cambridge Branch	Terminus
