= Seaford, Delaware =

City in Delaware, United States

- City
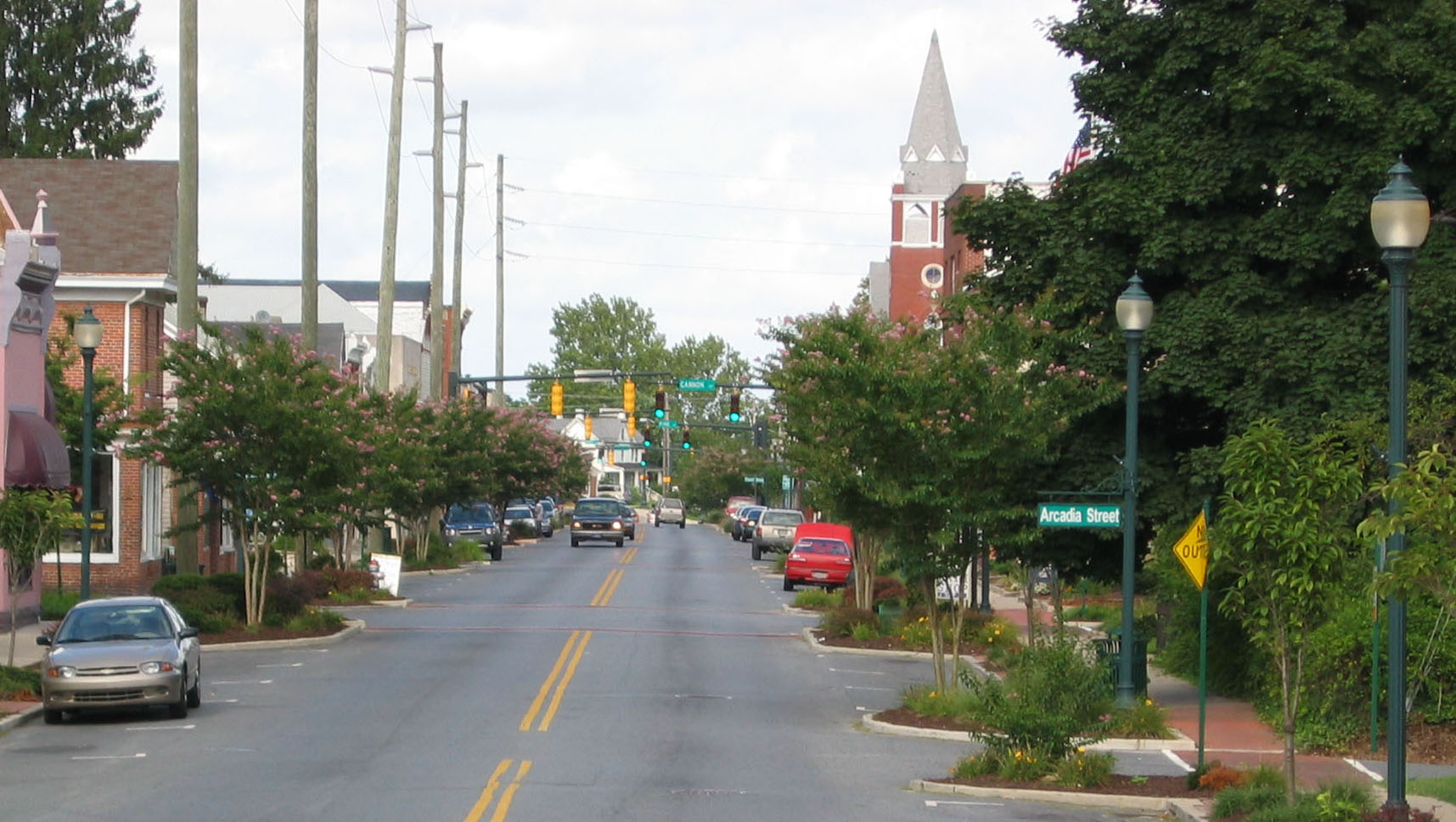
- High Street in Seaford

- Flag Seal
- Etymology: Seaford, East Sussex in England
- Location of Seaford in Sussex County, Delaware.

- Location within the state of Delaware Seaford (the United States)
- Coordinates: 38°38′28″N 75°36′40″W
- Country: United States
- State: Delaware
- County: Sussex
- Incorporated: April 6, 1865
- Named for: Seaford, East Sussex

Government
  - Type: Mayor-council
  - Mayor: Matt McCoy
  - Vice Mayor: Dan H. Henderson

Area
  - Total: 5.16 sq mi (13.37 km^{2})
  - Land: 5.09 sq mi (13.19 km^{2})
  - Water: 0.069 sq mi (0.18 km^{2})
- Elevation: 23 ft (7.0 m)

Population (2020)
  - Total: 7,957
  - Density: 1,562.6/sq mi (603.31/km^{2})
- Time zone: UTC−5 (Eastern (EST))
  - Summer (DST): UTC−4 (EDT)
- ZIP Code: 19973
- Area code: 302
- FIPS code: 10-64320
- GNIS feature ID: 214626
- Website: www.seafordde.com

Seaford is a city located along the Nanticoke River in Sussex County, Delaware, United States. As of the 2020 census, Seaford had a population of 7,957. It is part of the Seaford, Delaware, Micropolitan Statistical Area. It is the largest city fully within Sussex County.

== History ==
Seaford, Delaware, is named after Seaford, East Sussex, in England. The area has a rich history, with land that is now part of western and southern Sussex County originally settled as part of Maryland. Seaford was included in Dorchester County, Maryland, along with nearby towns like Bridgeville, Greenwood, and Middleford, while Blades, Laurel, and Concord belonged to neighboring Somerset County. An error in the delineation of boundary lines led to Delaware's east-west border being inaccurately established between Delmar and Fenwick rather than the intended location at Cape Henlopen. Had this original agreement been honored, Seaford would be situated in Maryland today. The definitive boundary was finally established by surveyors Charles Mason and Jeremiah Dixon in 1763 after lengthy legal disputes in London.

The first recorded settlement surrounding Seaford involved a large parcel known as "Martin's Hundred," a 1,750-acre tract granted to Jeremiah Jadwin of Virginia on January 22, 1672. Throughout this early period, the river served as major transportation, with roads only beginning to appear in official records around 1720. The area was primarily agricultural and focused heavily on tobacco cultivation, reflective of a plantation lifestyle. Archaeological evidence also suggests that the region east of contemporary Seaford was significant for bog iron production.

=== City seal ===
The City Seal of Seaford was originally designed in 1961 by Gary R. Blake, a patrolman in the Seaford Police Department. Each component of the seal represents significant aspects of Seaford's history and the overall heritage of Delaware:

- Ship: Symbolizes Seaford’s former name, "Hooper's Landing," and its shipping activities on the Nanticoke River.
- Figure One: Represents Delaware, known as the first state.
- Sheaf of Wheat: Signifies the region's agricultural heritage.
- Corn: Represents the milling industries based in Seaford.
- Holly: Depicts Delaware's state tree.
- Nylon: Acknowledges the significance of the nylon industry.
- Diamond: Reflects Delaware's nickname, the "Diamond State."
- Chicken: Symbolizes the poultry industry
- Farmer: Represents agricultural interests.
- Indian: Honors the Nanticoke Tribe.

In 2003, the City Council slightly modified the original seal, adding the year "1865" to indicate the date of Seaford's incorporation and correcting the spelling of "Capitol" to "Capital," adhering to proper terminology.

== Geography ==
According to the United States Census Bureau, the city has a total area of 3.5 square miles (9.1 km^{2}), of which 3.5 square miles (9.1 km^{2}) is land and 0.04 square miles (0.10 km^{2}) (1.14%) is water.

=== Climate ===
Situated on the Atlantic Coastal Plain, Seaford's weather is moderated by the Atlantic Ocean. Seaford has a mild subtropical climate consisting of hot, humid summers and cool winters.

The highest official temperature ever recorded in Seaford was 104 °F (40.0 °C) on July 22, 2011, while the all-time low was –13 °F (–25.0 °C) on January 28, 1987.

According to the Köppen climate classification, Seaford has a humid subtropical climate (abbreviated Cfa).

Climate data for Seaford, 1991–2020 simulated normals (26 ft elevation)
Month	Jan	Feb	Mar	Apr	May	Jun	Jul	Aug	Sep	Oct	Nov	Dec	Year
Mean daily maximum °F (°C)	45.1 (7.3)	47.7 (8.7)	54.9 (12.7)	66.0 (18.9)	74.5 (23.6)	83.1 (28.4)	87.8 (31.0)	85.6 (29.8)	79.9 (26.6)	69.4 (20.8)	58.5 (14.7)	49.5 (9.7)	66.8 (19.3)
Daily mean °F (°C)	36.1 (2.3)	37.9 (3.3)	44.6 (7.0)	55.0 (12.8)	64.2 (17.9)	73.2 (22.9)	78.1 (25.6)	75.7 (24.3)	69.8 (21.0)	58.6 (14.8)	48.2 (9.0)	40.3 (4.6)	56.8 (13.8)
Mean daily minimum °F (°C)	27.0 (−2.8)	28.2 (−2.1)	34.5 (1.4)	44.2 (6.8)	53.8 (12.1)	63.1 (17.3)	68.2 (20.1)	65.8 (18.8)	59.7 (15.4)	48.0 (8.9)	37.8 (3.2)	31.1 (−0.5)	46.8 (8.2)
Average precipitation inches (mm)	3.47 (88.23)	2.94 (74.66)	4.18 (106.27)	3.48 (88.41)	3.85 (97.88)	4.14 (105.07)	4.32 (109.85)	4.72 (119.81)	4.49 (114.17)	4.21 (106.98)	3.30 (83.78)	3.89 (98.68)	46.99 (1,193.79)
Average dew point °F (°C)	26.2 (−3.2)	27.0 (−2.8)	32.5 (0.3)	42.3 (5.7)	53.1 (11.7)	62.6 (17.0)	67.5 (19.7)	66.6 (19.2)	60.8 (16.0)	49.8 (9.9)	38.5 (3.6)	31.3 (−0.4)	46.5 (8.1)
Source: PRISM Climate Group

== Demographics ==
Historical population
Census	Pop.	Note	%±
1860	624		—
1870	1,304		109.0%
1880	1,542		18.3%
1890	1,462		−5.2%
1900	1,724		17.9%
1910	2,108		22.3%
1920	2,141		1.6%
1930	2,468		15.3%
1940	2,804		13.6%
1950	3,087		10.1%
1960	4,430		43.5%
1970	5,537		25.0%
1980	5,256		−5.1%
1990	5,689		8.2%
2000	6,699		17.8%
2010	6,928		3.4%
2020	7,957		14.9%
U.S. Decennial Census

=== Racial and ethnic composition ===
Seaford city, Delaware – Racial and ethnic composition Note: the US Census treats Hispanic/Latino as an ethnic category. This table excludes Latinos from the racial categories and assigns them to a separate category. Hispanics/Latinos may be of any race.
Race / Ethnicity (NH = Non-Hispanic)	Pop 2000	Pop 2010	Pop 2020	% 2000	% 2010	% 2020
White alone (NH)	4,144	3,574	3,597	61.86%	51.59%	45.21%
Black or African American alone (NH)	2,004	2,457	2,794	29.91%	35.46%	35.11%
Native American or Alaska Native alone (NH)	19	17	27	0.28%	0.25%	0.34%
Asian alone (NH)	100	131	163	1.49%	1.89%	2.05%
Native Hawaiian or Pacific Islander alone (NH)	13	1	0	0.19%	0.01%	0.00%
Other race alone (NH)	7	20	59	0.10%	0.29%	0.74%
Mixed race or Multiracial (NH)	127	168	383	1.90%	2.42%	4.81%
Hispanic or Latino (any race)	285	560	934	4.25%	8.08%	11.74%
Total	6,699	6,928	7,957	100.00%	100.00%	100.00%

=== 2020 census ===
As of the 2020 census, Seaford had a population of 7,957. The median age was 37.1 years. 26.1% of residents were under the age of 18 and 19.2% of residents were 65 years of age or older. For every 100 females there were 87.2 males, and for every 100 females age 18 and over there were 79.8 males age 18 and over.

97.5% of residents lived in urban areas, while 2.5% lived in rural areas.

There were 3,039 households in Seaford, of which 35.7% had children under the age of 18 living in them. Of all households, 33.0% were married-couple households, 18.6% were households with a male householder and no spouse or partner present, and 41.5% were households with a female householder and no spouse or partner present. About 31.6% of all households were made up of individuals and 16.3% had someone living alone who was 65 years of age or older.

There were 3,290 housing units, of which 7.6% were vacant. The homeowner vacancy rate was 3.2% and the rental vacancy rate was 5.9%.

Racial composition as of the 2020 census
Race	Number	Percent
White	3,749	47.1%
Black or African American	2,844	35.7%
American Indian and Alaska Native	51	0.6%
Asian	167	2.1%
Native Hawaiian and Other Pacific Islander	0	0.0%
Some other race	543	6.8%
Two or more races	603	7.6%

=== 2000 census ===
As of the 2000 census, there were 6,699 people, 2,629 households, and 1,664 families residing in the city. The population density was 1,925.9 inhabitants per square mile (743.6/km^{2}). There were 2,809 housing units at an average density of 807.5 per square mile (311.8/km^{2}). The racial makeup of the city was 64.04% White, 30.02% African American, 0.37% Native American, 1.49% Asian, 0.19% Pacific Islander, 1.72% from other races, and 2.16% from two or more races. Hispanic or Latino of any race were 4.25% of the population.

There were 2,629 households, of which 31.5% had children under 18 living with them, 37.8% were married couples living together, 22.3% had a female householder with no husband present, and 36.7% were non-families. 32.1% of all households were made up of individuals, and 15.4% had someone living alone who was 65 years of age or older. The average household size was 2.36 and the average family size was 2.95.

In the city, the age distribution of the population shows 25.6% under the age of 18, 9.4% from 18 to 24, 24.1% from 25 to 44, 18.9% from 45 to 64, and 22.0% who were 65 years of age or older. The median age was 38 years. For every 100 females, there were 77.6 males. For every 100 females aged 18 and over, there were 69.8 males.

The median income for a household in the city was $28,402, and the median income for a family was $39,688. Males had a median income of $30,467 versus $23,490 for females. The per capita income for the city was $15,022. About 22.0% of families and 27.6% of the population were below the poverty line, including 43.4% of those under age 18 and 13.2% of those aged 65 or over.

== Crime ==
According to National Incident-Based Reporting System (NIBRS), violent crime in the United States is most likely to be committed in urban areas. Violent crime is made up of rape, robbery, aggravated assault, and murder. To determine the most dangerous cities in Delaware in 2023, a review of the NIBRS data was conducted of violent crimes reported in 2022, 2021, and 2020 per 1,000 residents, with Uniform Crime Reporting Program data. Wilmington, the most populous city in Delaware, registered 2,412 violent cases Seaford was ranked second in the state behind Dewey Beach.

A combination of factors has led to Seaford being listed as the second-worst place to live in the state. Seaford has the highest rate of violent crimes and the fourth-highest property crime rate in Delaware. There were 498 crime cases in 2021, violent crime occurred at the rate of about 59.34 per 1000 residents in 2021. Seaford recorded 14 Kidnapping, 16 sex offenses, and 1 rape case, and in the crime against property, there were 1 arson, 20 motor vehicle theft, 13 robberies, and 262 drug/narcotic offenses.

== Art and culture ==
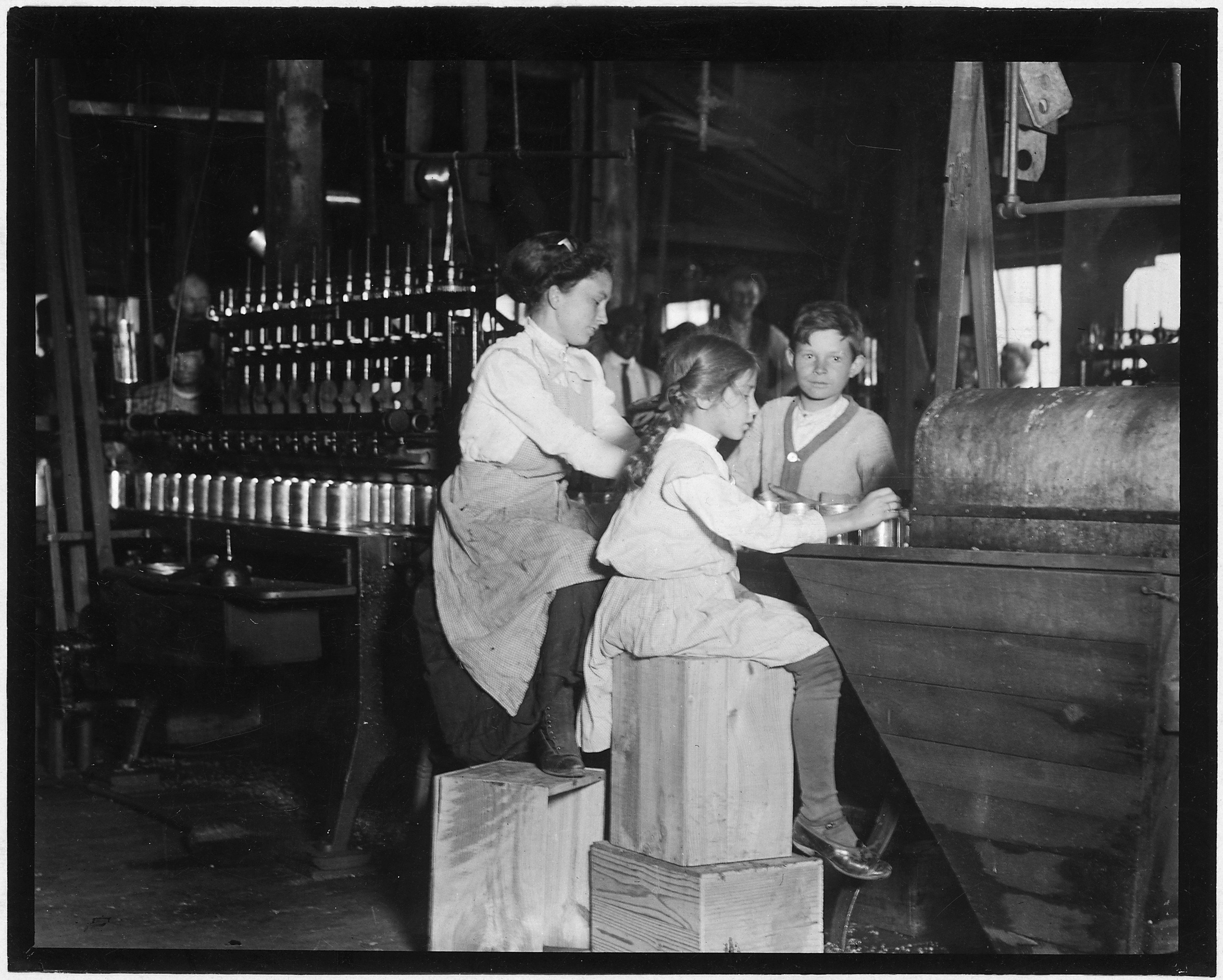
Child laborers at Ross's Canneries in Seaford, 1910. Photo by Lewis Hine.

=== National Register of Historic Places ===
Sites listed on the National Register of Historic Places include:

- Building at 200–202A High Street
- Building at 218 High Street
- Building at High and Cannon Streets
- Burton Hardware Store
- J. W. Cox Dry Goods Store
- First National Bank of Seaford
- Hearn and Rawlins Mill
- Lawrence
- Maston House
- Jesse Robinson House
- Edgar and Rachel Ross House
- Gov. William H. Ross House
- St. Luke's Protestant Episcopal Church
- Seaford Station Complex
- Sussex National Bank of Seaford

=== Points of interest ===
- Nanticoke River Arts Council/Gallery 107.
- Seaford Christmas Parade.
- Nanticoke River Walk - a pedestrian walkway beside the Nanticoke River in downtown Seaford.
- Seaford Museum – located in a former post office.
- Ross Mansion and Plantation – former residence of former Delaware Governor William H. H. Ross; the 20-acre (81,000 m^{2}) property includes the Gov. William H. Ross House, a granary with farm equipment exhibits, carriage house, a Victorian cottage and Delaware's only documented log slave quarters.
- Nanticoke Riverfest takes place in July and the Nanticoke River is used for inner tube floating. There is also a three-day festival.
- The AFRAM Festival is a celebration of African American culture held in August.

=== Library ===
Seaford District Library was founded in the early 1900s. It holds 28,000 items, and has a community center.

== Parks and recreation ==
- Kiwanis Park – a memorial park.
- Gateway Park – a park with brick sidewalks and a fountain, forming the gateway into downtown Seaford.
- Soroptimist Park – a park located at Williams Pond complete with a playground and a pavilion.
- Nutter Park – contains a playground and basketball courts.
- Williams Pond Park – a ballpark run by the Nanticoke Little League.
- Sports Complex – includes the Jay's Nest community-built playground, and softball facilities.
- Hooper's Landing Golf and Country Club – a public 18-hole course, pool, tennis courts and driving range.

== Government ==
Mayor - Council
- Mayor: Matthew MacCoy
- Elected: 2024, 1st Term
- Liaison Appointment: Economic Development
- Vice Mayor: Dan H. Henderson
- Elected: 2014, 4th Term
- Liaison Appointment: Police Department & Fire Department
- Councilman: Michael Bradley
- Elected: 2023, 1st Term
- Liaison Appointment: Electric
- Councilman: Orlando Holland
- Elected: 2015, 4th Term
- Liaison Appointment: Administration & Information Technology
- Councilman: Dr. Stephanie Grassett
- Elected: 2024, 1st Term
- Liaison Appointment: Code & Parks and Recreation
- Councilman: Alan Quillen
- Elected: 2024, 1st Term
- Liaison Appointment: Public Works & Wastewater

Seaford has a mayor-council system of government with a mayor and a city council, the mayor has no official authority outside the council, serving a chiefly ceremonial role as council chairperson.

== Education ==
Seaford is home to the Seaford School District. The Seaford School District, based in the town of Seaford, Delaware, encompasses 82 square miles in the southwest corner of Sussex County. It serves the communities of Seaford and Blades and consists of four elementary, one middle, and one high school (Seaford Senior High School), serving approximately 3,500 students in grades pre-K through 12.

== Media ==
=== Radio ===
WGMD The Talk of Delmarva 92.7 FM/98.5 broadcasts from just outside the city limits.

=== Television ===
WDPB-TV 64 is the only television station originating from Seaford. It is a full-time rebroadcaster of WHYY-TV in Philadelphia and a member station of PBS.

=== Newspapers ===
The Seaford Star is a weekly newspaper. Morning Star Publications has been in business for approximately 27 years.

- Name: Morning Star Publications Inc.
- Trade Name: Seaford Star, Laurel Star, Morning Star Report, Business Report, and Salisbury Star

Website: starpublications.online

== Infrastructure ==
=== Transportation ===
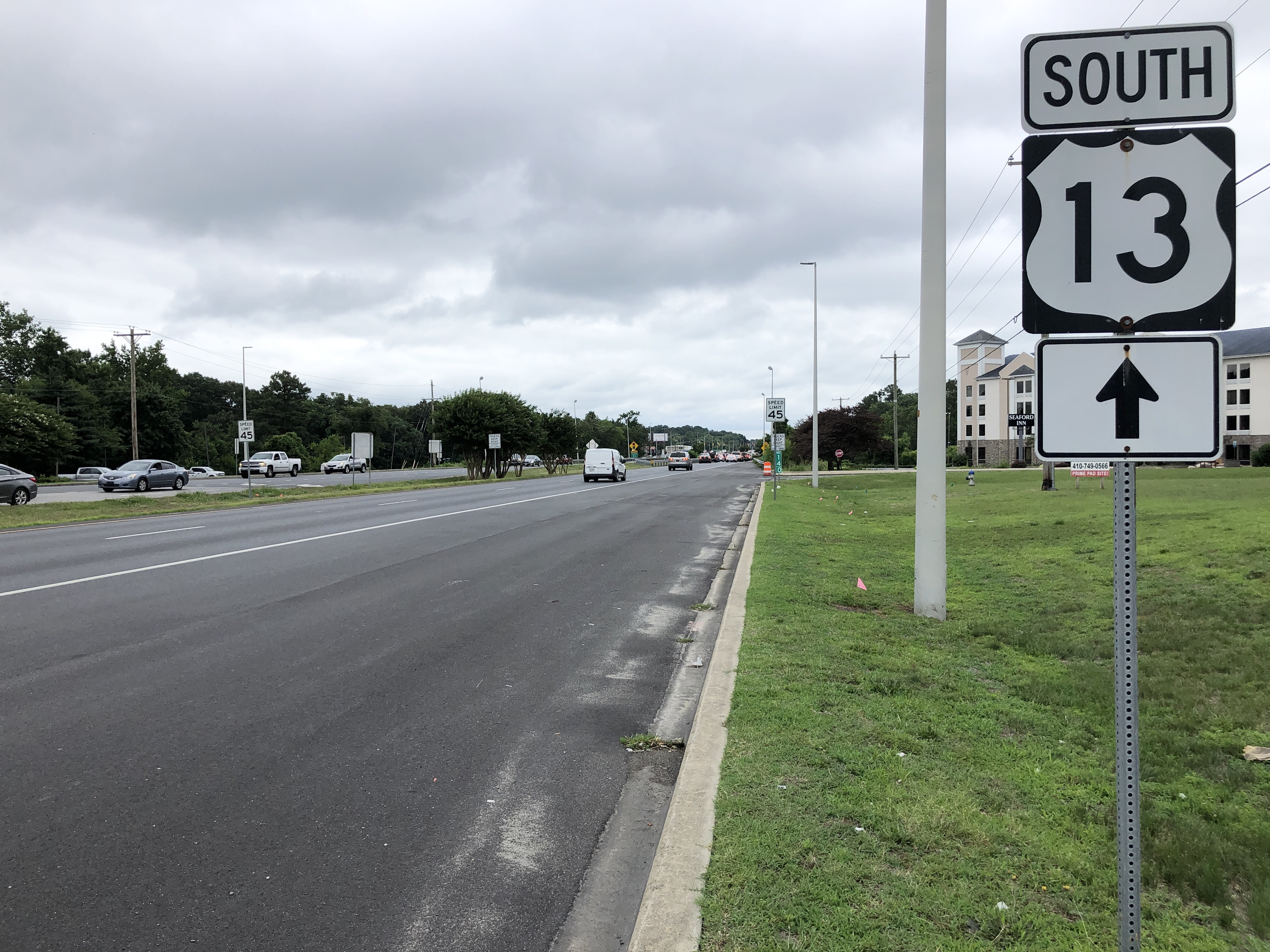
US 13 southbound/DE 20 eastbound in Seaford

U.S. Route 13 is the main north-south thoroughfare within city limits, with Delaware Route 20 being the main east-west highway. U.S. Route 13 connects Seaford with Bridgeville to the north and Laurel to the south as part of the Sussex Highway. State Route 20 connects Seaford with Millsboro to the east and tiny Reliance, Maryland to the west.

The closest airport with commercial air service to Seaford is the Wicomico Regional Airport in Salisbury, Maryland. The closest public airport is Laurel Airport in Laurel, Delaware. There is also an airport in Georgetown called the Delaware Coastal Airport. This airport has a jet service section, as part of the nearby industrial park.

DART First State operates the Route 212 bus that connects Seaford to Georgetown and Delmar and the Route 903F bus that runs on a loop through Seaford.

Freight rail service in Seaford is provided by two carriers: the Delmarva Central Railroad and the Maryland and Delaware Railroad. The Delmarva Central Railroad runs north-south through the city, parallel to US 13. It interchanges with the Maryland and Delaware Railroad in Seaford, which heads west to Federalsburg and Cambridge in Maryland.

=== Utilities ===
The City of Seaford Electric Department provides electricity to approximately 6,700 customers in the city. The electric department owns three substations and more than 37 miles (60 km) of transmission and distribution lines. The city purchases its electricity and is a member of the Delaware Municipal Electric Corporation. The Public Works department provides water and sewer service to the city. Natural gas service in Seaford is provided by Chesapeake Utilities.

=== Health care ===
TidalHealth Hospital and TidalHealth Cancer Care Center, both operated by TidalHealth Health Services, are located in Seaford.

== Notable people ==
- Delino DeShields, former baseball player
- Ricky Elliott, American racing driver
- Stephanie Hansen, Delaware state senator
- Horace G. Knowles, U.S. Ambassador
- Mike Neill, former Olympic baseball player
- Lovett Purnell, former American football player
- Darnell Savage, American football player
