= Puncheon Run Connector =

Dover Freeway in Delaware

- Puncheon Run Connector highlighted in red

Route information
- Maintained by DelDOT
- Length: 2.39 mi (3.85 km)
- Existed: 2000–present

Major junctions
- West end: US 13 in Dover
- East end: DE 1 Toll in Dover

Location
- Country: United States
- State: Delaware
- Counties: Kent

Highway system
- Delaware State Route System; List; Byways

The Puncheon Run Connector is an unnumbered four-lane freeway in the city of Dover in Kent County, Delaware. It is named after Puncheon Run, a stream it follows. It provides a connection from U.S. Route 13 (US 13) east to the northbound direction of the Delaware Route 1 (DE 1) toll road, with an intermediate interchange at Bay Road. The road is part of the National Highway System and serves as part of a north–south route for traffic crossing the Delmarva Peninsula. Planning for the Puncheon Run Connector began in the 1980s and originally included a freeway upgrade of US 13 south to Woodside. The connector was scaled back to its current routing in 1992. The freeway was built between 1998 and 2000 at a cost of $25 million.

== Route description ==
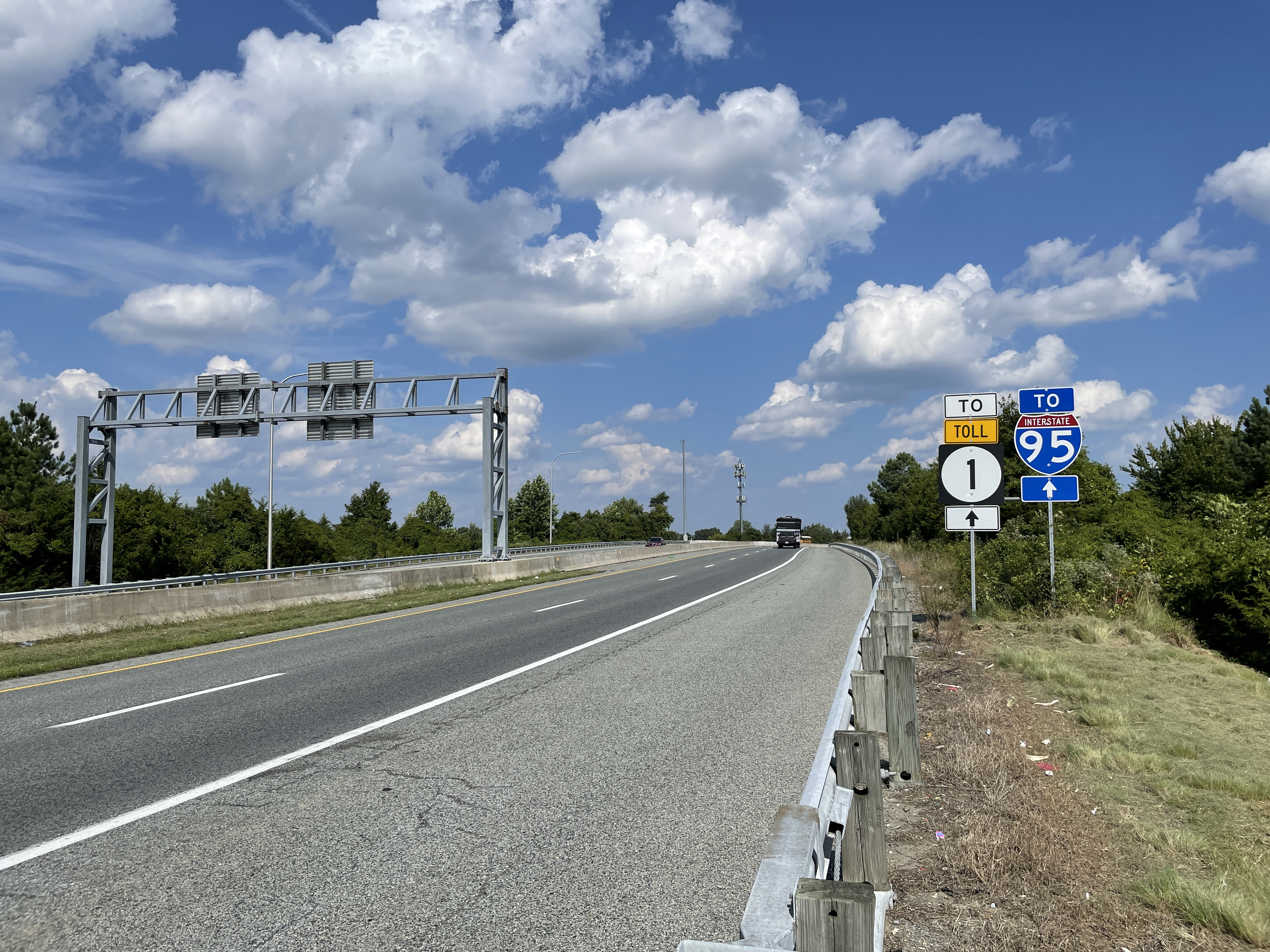
The Puncheon Run Connector eastbound past US 13 in Dover

The Puncheon Run Connector begins at an at-grade intersection with US 13 in the city of Dover, heading to the northeast as a four-lane freeway. The intersection with US 13 has no access from southbound US 13 to the freeway. After passing over South State Street and Puncheon Run, the freeway curves to the east and runs between woods and the parallel Puncheon Run to the south and residential and commercial development to the north. The road crosses over the St. Jones River in marshland and continues east-northeast, passing between a residential neighborhood to the south and the Delaware Department of Transportation (DelDOT) headquarters to the north before coming to an eastbound exit and westbound entrance at Bay Road. Immediately after the Bay Road interchange, the Puncheon Run Connector merges into the northbound direction of the DE 1 toll road at a partial interchange a short distance to the north of Dover Air Force Base, with access to northbound DE 1 and from southbound DE 1.

The Puncheon Run Connector has an annual average daily traffic count of 14,618 vehicles. The entire length of the Puncheon Run Connector is part of the National Highway System.

== History ==
Planning for the Puncheon Run Connector dates back to the 1980s, when a "Relief Route" was proposed for US 13 between Dover and Wilmington. In 1987, plans called for the Puncheon Run Connector to be built along its current alignment between US 13 and DE 1, with an intermediate interchange at US 113 (Bay Road), in addition to US 13 being upgraded to a freeway south to Woodside, with interchanges at Webbs Lane in Dover and DE 10 in Camden. In 1992, DelDOT held a meeting to discuss proposals for the road, including a possible Far West By-Pass Connector through the western part of Dover. The city of Dover initially opposed the Puncheon Run Connector and favored the Far West By-Pass Connector as the latter would ease traffic congestion caused by development in the western part of the city. Plans for the connector were modified in 1992 to not include the upgrade of US 13 to a freeway between Woodside and Dover. Prior to the construction of the Puncheon Run Connector, a site along Puncheon Run had to be excavated by DelDOT and Louis Berger & Associates as it consisted of Native American artifacts from prehistoric times. The excavation of the site lasted from October 1997 to September 1998. Construction on the road began in October 1998. The Puncheon Run Connector was completed and opened to traffic in a ribbon-cutting ceremony on December 19, 2000, with Governor Tom Carper and DelDOT secretary Anne Canby in attendance. The road was constructed by David A. Bramble, Inc. and G.A. & F.C. Wagman, Inc. at a cost of $25 million.

== Exit list ==
The entire road is in Dover, Kent County.

mi	km	Exit	Destinations	Notes
0.00	0.00		US 13 – Dover, Salisbury, Norfolk	At-grade intersection; no access from southbound US 13
1.61	2.59	2A	Bay Road south – Dover AFB	Eastbound exit and westbound entrance; to DE 1 south
1.61	2.59	2B	Bay Road north – South Dover	Eastbound exit and westbound entrance; last eastbound exit before toll
2.39	3.85		DE 1 Toll north – Wilmington, Delaware Memorial Bridge	Access to north DE 1 and from south DE 1; DE 1 exit 97
1.000 mi = 1.609 km; 1.000 km = 0.621 mi: Incomplete access
