= U.S. Route 13 in Delaware =

Highway in Delaware

U.S. Route 13
- Delaware section of US 13 highlighted in red

Route information
- Maintained by DelDOT and USACE
- Length: 103.33 mi (166.29 km)
- Existed: 1926–present
- Tourist routes: Harriet Tubman Underground Railroad Byway; Washington–Rochambeau Revolutionary Route

Major junctions
- South end: US 13 at the Maryland state line in Delmar
- US 9 in Laurel; DE 404 in Bridgeville; DE 1 Toll in Dover; DE 896 in Boyds Corner; DE 1 in Tybouts Corner; US 40 in State Road; US 202 / DE 141 in Wilmington Manor; I-295 / US 40 in Wilmington Manor; I-495 near Wilmington; I-495 in Claymont
- North end: US 13 at Pennsylvania border near Claymont

Location
- Country: United States
- State: Delaware
- Counties: Sussex, Kent, New Castle

Highway system
- United States Numbered Highway System; List; Special; Divided; Delaware State Route System; List; Byways
← DE 12	→ DE 14

U.S. Route 13 (US 13) is a U.S. highway running from Fayetteville, North Carolina, north to Morrisville, Pennsylvania. In the U.S. state of Delaware, the route runs for 103.33 mi (166.29 km). It traverses the entire north–south length of the state from the Maryland state line in Delmar, Sussex County, north to the Pennsylvania state line in Claymont, New Castle County. US 13 connects many important cities and towns in Delaware, including Seaford, Dover, and Wilmington. The entire length of US 13 in Delaware is a multilane divided highway with the exceptions of the segment through Wilmington and parts of the route in Claymont. Between the Maryland state line and Dover, US 13 serves as one of the main north–south routes across the Delmarva Peninsula. From Dover north to Tybouts Corner, the route is followed by the controlled-access Delaware Route 1 (DE 1) toll road, which crosses the route multiple times and has multiple interchanges with it. US 13 bypasses downtown Wilmington to the east before it heads northeast of the city parallel to Interstate 495 (I-495) and the Delaware River to Claymont. US 13 is the longest numbered highway in the state of Delaware.

The portion of US 13 between Delmar and Dover was constructed as a state highway during the 1920s. Between Dover and Wilmington, the route was built as part of the cross-state DuPont Highway, which was completed in 1923 and improved transportation between northern and southern Delaware. North of Wilmington, what would become US 13 was originally built as the Philadelphia Pike in the 1820s and improved to a state highway by 1920. US 13 was designated through Delaware when the U.S. Highway System was created in 1926. The route was widened into a divided highway between Dover and Wilmington in the 1930s and between Delmar and Dover in the 1950s. US 13 was routed to bypass Dover in the 1950s. In 1970, US 13 was moved to its current alignment between Wilmington and Claymont on a bypass built in the 1930s. The portion of US 13 between Dover and Wilmington saw heavy traffic heading to the Delaware Beaches in the summer, which led to the construction of a freeway "Relief Route" parallel to US 13. This freeway was built as DE 1, which was completed in 2003. The construction of DE 1 necessitated the realignment of US 13 in two places.

== Route description ==
US 13 enters Delaware from Maryland in Delmar and heads north through Sussex County as a multilane divided highway called Sussex Highway, passing through rural areas and various cities and towns including Laurel, Seaford, Bridgeville, and Greenwood. The route continues into Kent County, where it becomes Dupont Highway and runs north through Harrington, Felton, and Camden. US 13 passes through Dover, where it heads through commercial areas. Past Dover, the route is paralleled by the controlled-access DE 1 toll road and comes to Smyrna, where it enters New Castle County. Here, US 13 continues north and crosses DE 1 multiple times, passing through Odessa. The route crosses the Chesapeake & Delaware Canal on the St. Georges Bridge before it runs concurrent with the DE 1 freeway between Wrangle Hill and Tybouts Corner. Upon splitting from DE 1, US 13 heads northeast through suburban areas along the multilane divided Dupont Highway, forming a concurrency with US 40 in the New Castle area. The route passes through the eastern part of Wilmington on city streets, including a one-way pair. Upon leaving Wilmington, US 13 becomes a multilane divided highway called Governor Printz Boulevard and runs northeast parallel to I-495 and the Delaware River to Claymont, where it follows Philadelphia Pike to the Pennsylvania state line.

The section of US 13 south of Tybouts Corner serves as part of a primary hurricane evacuation route from coastal areas of the Delmarva Peninsula to inland areas to the north. Portions of US 13 in Delaware are designated as part of the Delaware Byways system. The segments between US 13 Alt. (North State Street) in Dover and Main Street in Smyrna, DE 9 (New Castle Avenue) and A Street in Wilmington, and Swedes Landing Road and DE 9 (4th Street) in Wilmington are part of the Harriet Tubman Underground Railroad Byway. The section of US 13 in Delaware between US 13 Bus. (Philadelphia Pike) and the Pennsylvania state line in Claymont is part of the Washington–Rochambeau Revolutionary Route, a National Historic Trail. US 13 in Delaware has an annual average daily traffic count ranging from a high of 77,363 vehicles at the US 202/DE 141 interchange near New Castle to a low of 4,096 vehicles at the southern border of Wilmington. US 13 in Delaware is a part of the National Highway System between the Maryland state line in Delmar and the Puncheon Run Connector freeway in Dover, from DE 1 in Wrangle Hill to I-495 in Minquadale, and between DE 92 and the Pennsylvania state line in Claymont. US 13 in Delaware is designated as a Blue Star Memorial Highway honoring those who have served in the United States Armed Forces; Blue Star Memorial Highway markers are located at the Smyrna Rest Area and in Seaford. The route was designated as a Blue Star Memorial Highway between the Maryland state line and Dover in 1981 and between Dover and the Pennsylvania state line in 1998.

=== Sussex County ===
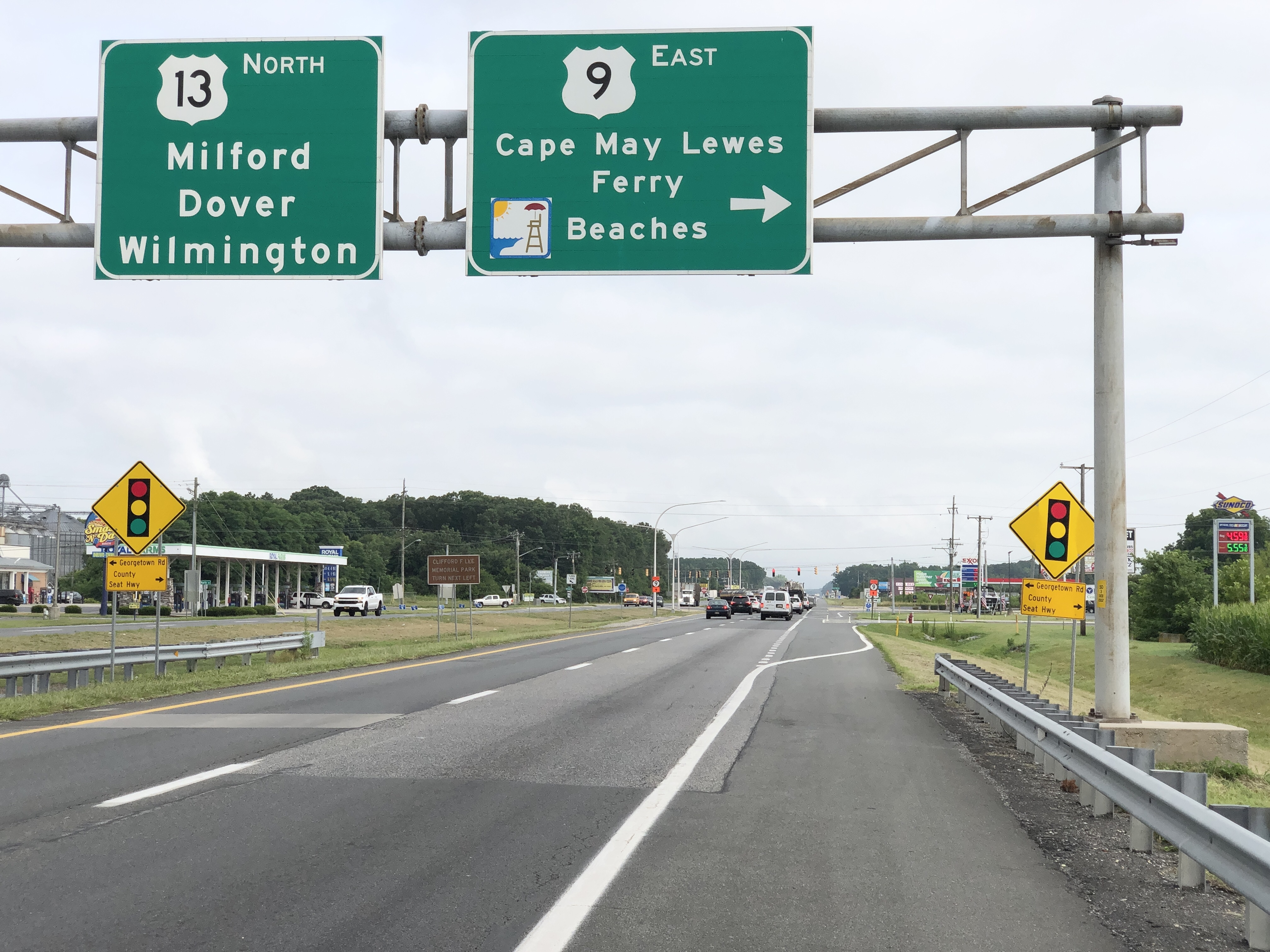
US 13 northbound at western terminus of US 9 in Laurel

US 13 enters Delaware from Maryland in the town of Delmar in Sussex County. At the state line, the route intersects DE/MD 54, which follows the state line for several miles. US 13 continues north from the DE/MD 54 intersection on four-lane divided Sussex Highway, passing businesses. The route leaves Delmar and heads to the east of US 13 Dragway and Delaware International Speedway, running through wooded areas with some farm fields and development. The road crosses Dorothy Road/Whitesville Road at a superstreet intersection and continues through a mix of farmland and woodland before it reaches the town of Laurel. Here, US 13 heads past a few businesses and comes to a junction with DE 24. Following this, the route crosses Records Pond along Broad Creek and curves northwest. The road passes farm fields before it intersects the western terminus of US 9 and Georgetown Road near businesses. Past this intersection, US 13 leaves Laurel and runs through farms and woods with occasional development. The route heads north again and comes to a junction with DE 20 to the east of the town of Blades, at which point DE 20 turns north for a concurrency with US 13. The road crosses the Nanticoke River and heads into Seaford, where it passes businesses prior to heading across Williams Pond along Clear Brook. Past this, DE 20 splits from US 13 by heading to the west, while US 13 continues north through commercial areas.

US 13 leaves Seaford and continues into rural areas with some development along the road. The road crosses Clear Brook east of Hearns Pond and the highway passes to the east of a residential development as Bridgeville Highway intersects the road. The road passes west of a park and ride lot located at a church and continues near housing subdivisions and businesses before it comes to the DE 18 junction east of Cannon. US 13 heads north past more farmland before it reaches an intersection south of the town of Bridgeville where DE 404 heads to the southeast and US 13 Bus./DE 404 Bus. head northwest into Bridgeville. At this point, US 13 becomes concurrent with DE 404 and the two routes pass through rural areas with some development to the east of Bridgeville. North of town, the road crosses Redden Road before meeting the northern terminus of US 13 Bus. at a southbound right-in/right-out intersection. A short distance later, DE 404 splits from US 13 by heading to the west. From here, the highway runs through a mix of farms and woods with some homes and businesses along the road. Upon reaching the town of Greenwood, the travel lanes of US 13 split to include businesses in the median. In Greenwood, the route crosses DE 16/DE 36. Upon departing Greenwood, the median narrows and the road heads back into rural areas.

=== Kent County ===
US 13 continues north into Kent County, where the name of the road changes to South Dupont Highway. The route runs through a mix of woodland and farmland with some homes, crossing Booth Branch and passing to the east of the small town of Farmington, with Main Street providing access to the town. To the south of Harrington, US 13 intersects DE 14 Truck and becomes concurrent with that route. The road heads into Harrington and runs through commercial areas, passing to the east of the Delaware State Fairgrounds, which is where the Delaware State Fair is held and the Harrington Raceway & Casino and Centre Ice Rink are located. US 13/DE 14 Truck crosses the Delmarva Central Railroad's Indian River Subdivision line at-grade, with the median widening to include businesses in it. US 13 intersects DE 14, where the concurrent truck route ends, and continues near more commercial establishments before the median narrows again. The route leaves Harrington, where it passes east of a park and ride lot at the Harrington Moose Lodge at the Carpenter Bridge Road intersection, and traverses more farmland before crossing the Murderkill River in a wooded area to the west of Killens Pond State Park. Access to the state park from US 13 is provided by Paradise Alley Road south of the river and Killens Pond Road north of the river. US 13 heads past more farms and some development before it reaches the town of Felton, where it intersects DE 12 and runs near homes and businesses on the eastern edge of the town. After heading out of Felton, the highway passes through rural areas of development before crossing Hudson Branch and coming to Canterbury. Here, the route intersects Evens Road/Irish Hill Road, with Evens Road leading west to the town of Viola. A park and ride lot at a gas station is located on the southeast corner of the intersection. A short distance later, US 13 comes to a junction with DE 15 and forms a short concurrency with that route before DE 15 splits to the northwest along with US 13 Alt. The road traverses woodland before it reaches an intersection with DE 10 Alt. near a few businesses on the eastern edge of the town of Woodside.

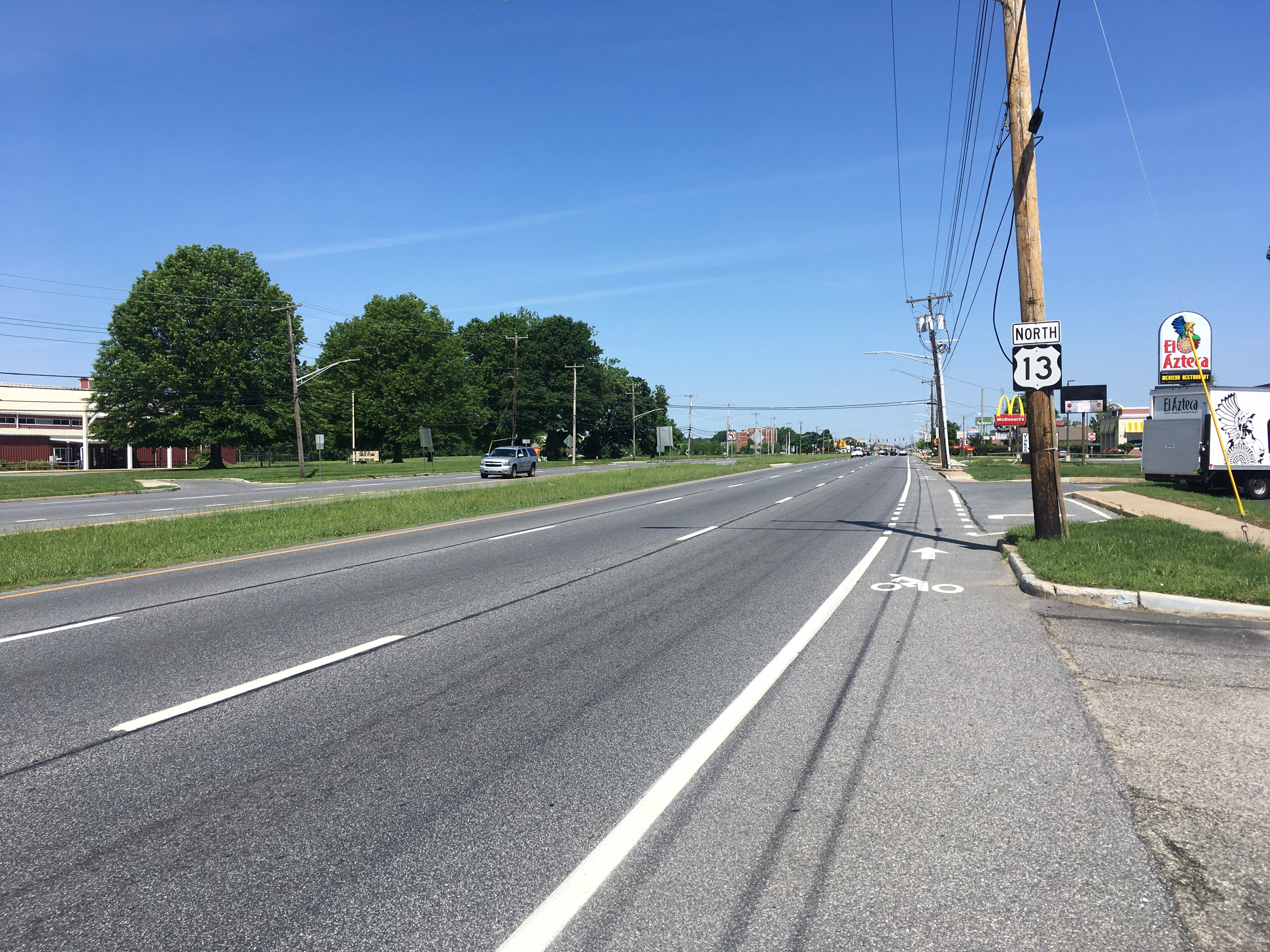
US 13 northbound past the northern terminus of US 13 Alt. in Dover

Following this, US 13 runs through a mix of farms and woods, crossing Tidbury Creek, before suburban residential and commercial development increases as the highway enters the town of Camden. The route crosses Newell Branch and heads past several businesses as it runs through the eastern edge of the town, coming to an intersection with DE 10. The road passes near homes and commercial establishments before reaching a junction with the northern terminus of US 13 Alt. in the northern part of Camden east of Brecknock County Park. US 13 crosses Isaac Branch and heads along the eastern edge of Rodney Village, where it intersects the southern terminus of POW/MIA Parkway and another US 13 Alt. splits off to the northwest. Following this, the road passes to the west of Kent Acres. US 13 enters Dover at the Webbs Lane junction and comes to an at-grade intersection with the western terminus of the Puncheon Run Connector freeway, which heads east to provide access from northbound US 13 to the northbound direction of the DE 1 toll road and access from southbound DE 1 to US 13. Past this, the route runs northeast through business areas with some nearby homes, crossing Puncheon Run before reaching a junction with South State Street. The road curves north and passes over the St. Jones River, continuing past more commercial areas. US 13 intersects Martin Luther King Jr. Boulevard, which heads west to the Dover Green Historic District and Delaware Legislative Hall, a short distance before four-lane divided Bay Road merges into the northbound direction of US 13 at a directional intersection. Past Bay Road, US 13 widens to six lanes and continues northwest, crossing DE 8. At this intersection, the name of the road changes to North Dupont Highway. The route curves north and then northwest again as it is lined with several businesses. North of Silver Lake, US 13 intersects the northern terminus of US 13 Alt. along with Leipsic Road east of the Delaware Agricultural Museum and Village. The highway runs between Dover Motor Speedway and the Bally's Dover hotel, casino, and harness racetrack to the northeast and Delaware State University and the university's Alumni Stadium to the southwest. The route passes to the southwest of the Dover Mall and the Delaware State Police Headquarters and Museum as it continues past more businesses. US 13 heads southwest of the Dover Campus of Wilmington University prior to coming to an intersection with Scarborough Road, which leads northeast to an interchange with DE 1 and southwest to DE 15 in the western part of Dover.

Past Scarborough Road, the road narrows back to four lanes and passes northeast of the Terry Campus of Delaware Technical Community College. At the West Denneys Road intersection, US 13 leaves Dover and continues past residential and commercial development. To the east of the town of Cheswold, the route has a junction with DE 42 at Bishops Corner. Following this, the highway heads through a mix of residential development and farmland, crossing Alston Branch before curving north at the point it crosses the Leipsic River to the east of Garrisons Lake. US 13 passes more development and rural areas as it continues north and enters the town of Smyrna. Here, the name changes to South Dupont Boulevard and it runs past businesses as it reaches a ramp to the DE 1 toll road to the east. The road bends to the northwest as it heads to the east of a residential neighborhood and intersects Smyrna-Leipsic Road before passing west of the Belmont Hall State Conference Center. The route crosses Mill Creek to the east of Lake Como and runs through commercial areas in the eastern part of Smyrna. US 13 intersects DE 6, at which point the name becomes North Dupont Boulevard and DE 6 turns north for a concurrency. In the northern part of town, DE 6 splits from US 13 by heading southwest along with DE 300.

=== New Castle County ===
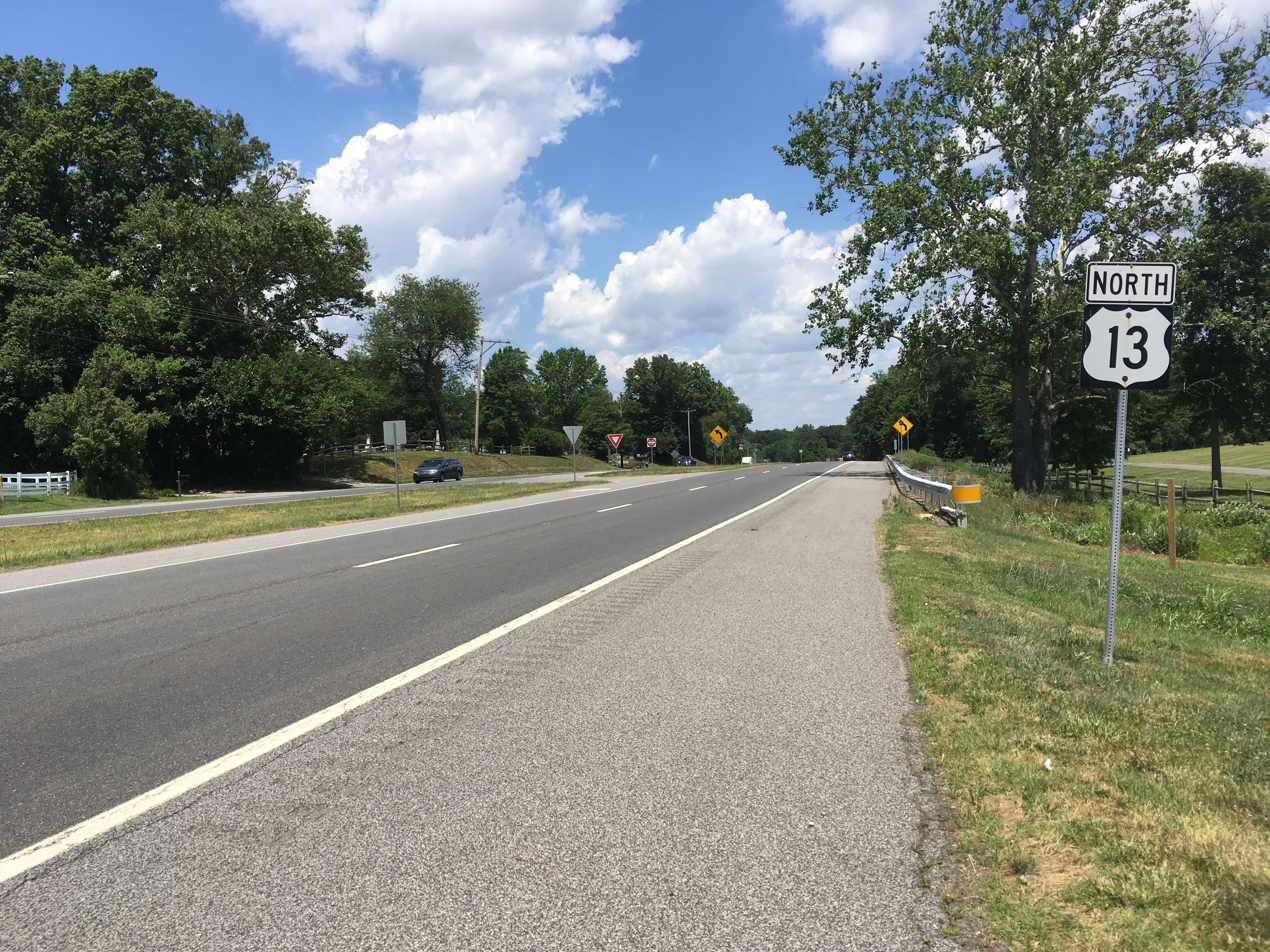
US 13 northbound north of Odessa

US 13 crosses the Duck Creek into New Castle County, where it heads through rural residential and commercial development and leaves Smyrna. The name changes to Dupont Parkway and the road passes to the west of the Smyrna Rest Area accessible from both directions before it comes to an interchange with DE 1, at which point the freeway crosses US 13. The highway continues northwest through wooded areas with some farm fields and homes. US 13 passes a northbound weigh station before it heads across Sandom Branch and under the DE 1 freeway. The route runs through Blackbird and crosses the Blackbird Creek before it curves north and comes to an intersection with the southern terminus of DE 71 at H and H Corner; DE 71 heads northwest to the town of Townsend. A short distance past this junction, the road passes under DE 1 again and crosses Herring Run. The highway continues through woodland and development before it intersects Pine Tree Road/Blackbird Landing Road, where there is a park and pool lot on the northwest corner of the intersection. From here, the road runs immediately to the east of DE 1, passing through Fieldsboro and running near residential subdivisions. DE 1 curves northwest away from US 13, with US 13 crossing the Appoquinimink River and heading into residential areas.

The route passes west of a park and pool lot and enters the town of Odessa, where the median widens to include development within it and the road curves to the northeast. In Odessa, US 13 is known as 5th Street northbound and 6th Street southbound in addition to Dupont Parkway. Through the town, the route passes homes and a few businesses, crossing DE 299. Upon leaving Odessa, the median narrows again and US 13 continues into rural areas along Dupont Parkway, passing under DE 1. The road curves north and crosses Drawyer Creek a short distance to the west of DE 1. The highway runs through a mix of farmland and residential subdivisions before it comes to an intersection with the southern terminus of DE 896 and Pole Bridge Road in Boyds Corner, with Pole Bridge Road heading east to an interchange with DE 1. Following this, US 13 passes under DE 1 again and runs through more farmland a short distance to the east of the Biddles Corner toll plaza on DE 1. As the highway approaches St. Georges, a partial interchange provides access to and from the northbound direction of DE 1; the ramp from southbound DE 1 connects to US 13 by way of Lorewood Grove Road while there is a direct ramp from US 13 to northbound DE 1 at the Port Penn Road intersection in Biddles Corner that merges with the ramp from the northbound direction of the US 301 toll road to northbound DE 1. A right-in/right-out interchange connects to South Main Street northbound and Lorewood Grove Road southbound to provide access to South St. Georges.

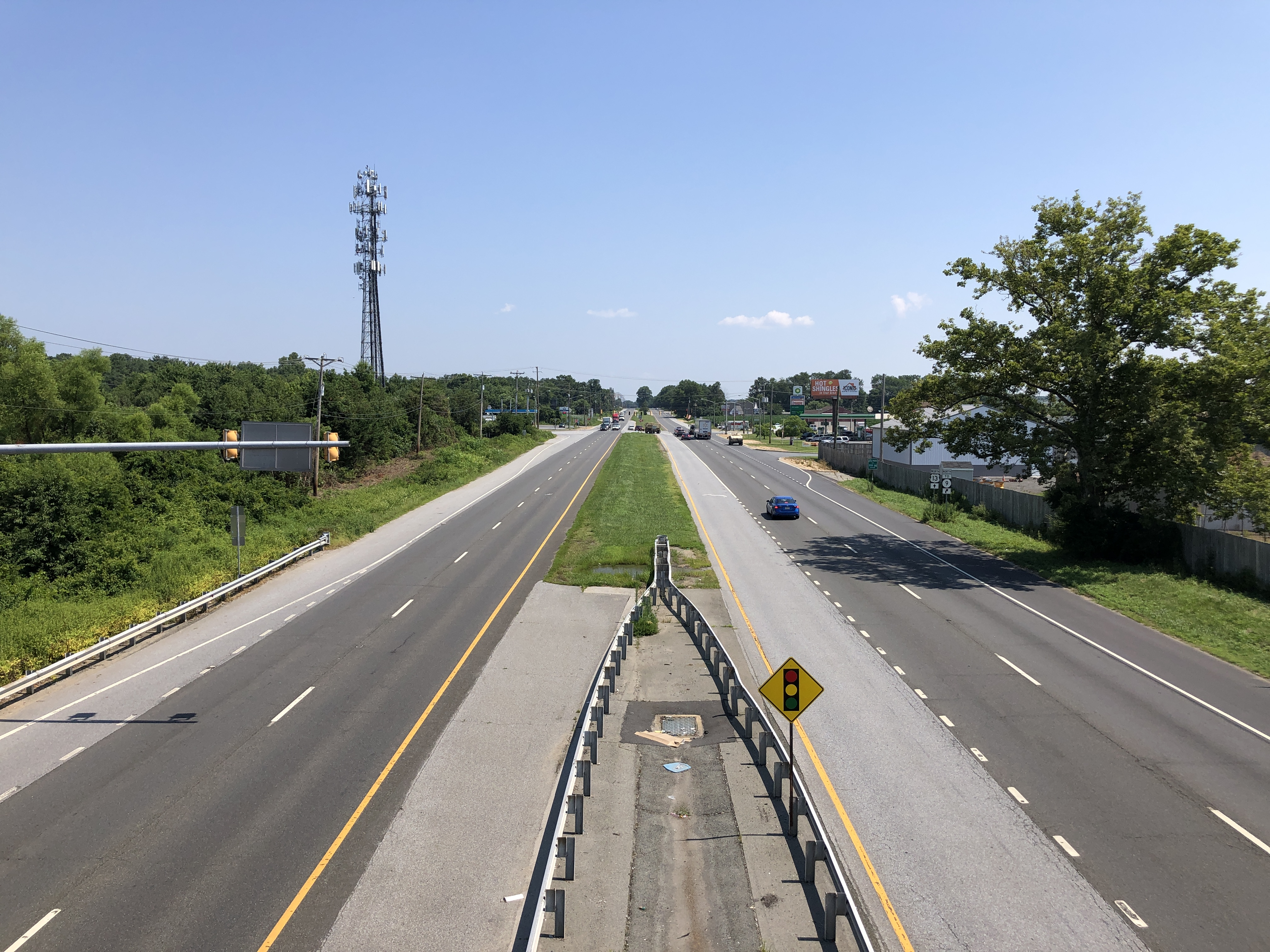
US 13 northbound past DE 1 and DE 71 in Tybouts Corner

US 13 heads across the Chesapeake & Delaware Canal and the Michael N. Castle Trail on the north bank of the canal on the St. Georges Bridge, a tied-arch bridge which is two lanes wide with bike lanes. Past the bridge, the name changes to South Dupont Highway and the road comes to a right-in/right-out interchange which connects to Broad Street northbound and North Main Street southbound to provide access to North St. Georges. The route becomes four lanes again as it runs through rural areas with some development, crossing Dragon Creek. The road passes to the east of a park and ride lot before reaching an intersection with DE 72 and the southern terminus of DE 7 in Wrangle Hill to the west of Delaware City. Here, US 13 turns west to join DE 72 on four-lane divided Wrangle Hill Road while DE 7 continues north along South Dupont Highway. A short distance later, the road comes to a diverging diamond interchange with DE 1, at which point US 13 splits from DE 72 and heads north along with DE 1 on a six-lane freeway named Korean War Veterans Memorial Highway. The freeway runs through farmland and passes over Norfolk Southern's Reybold Industrial Track and DE 7 without access to the west of PBF Energy's Delaware City Refinery. US 13/DE 1 cross Red Lion Creek and continue concurrent on the freeway to Tybouts Corner, where DE 1 splits at an interchange to remain as a freeway and US 13 reverts to a four-lane divided highway with at-grade intersections called South Dupont Highway. Within the DE 1 interchange, US 13 has an at-grade intersection with the northern terminus of DE 71. A short distance later, the highway intersects Bear Road/Hamburg Road, where DE 9 Truck joins US 13. The road heads northeast through farmland with some businesses, passing to the east of the Buena Vista State Conference Center, before continuing into suburban residential and commercial development. US 13 crosses Army Creek and passes under Norfolk Southern's New Castle Secondary railroad line before it comes to a directional intersection with US 40 in State Road; this intersection has no access from northbound US 13 to westbound US 40.

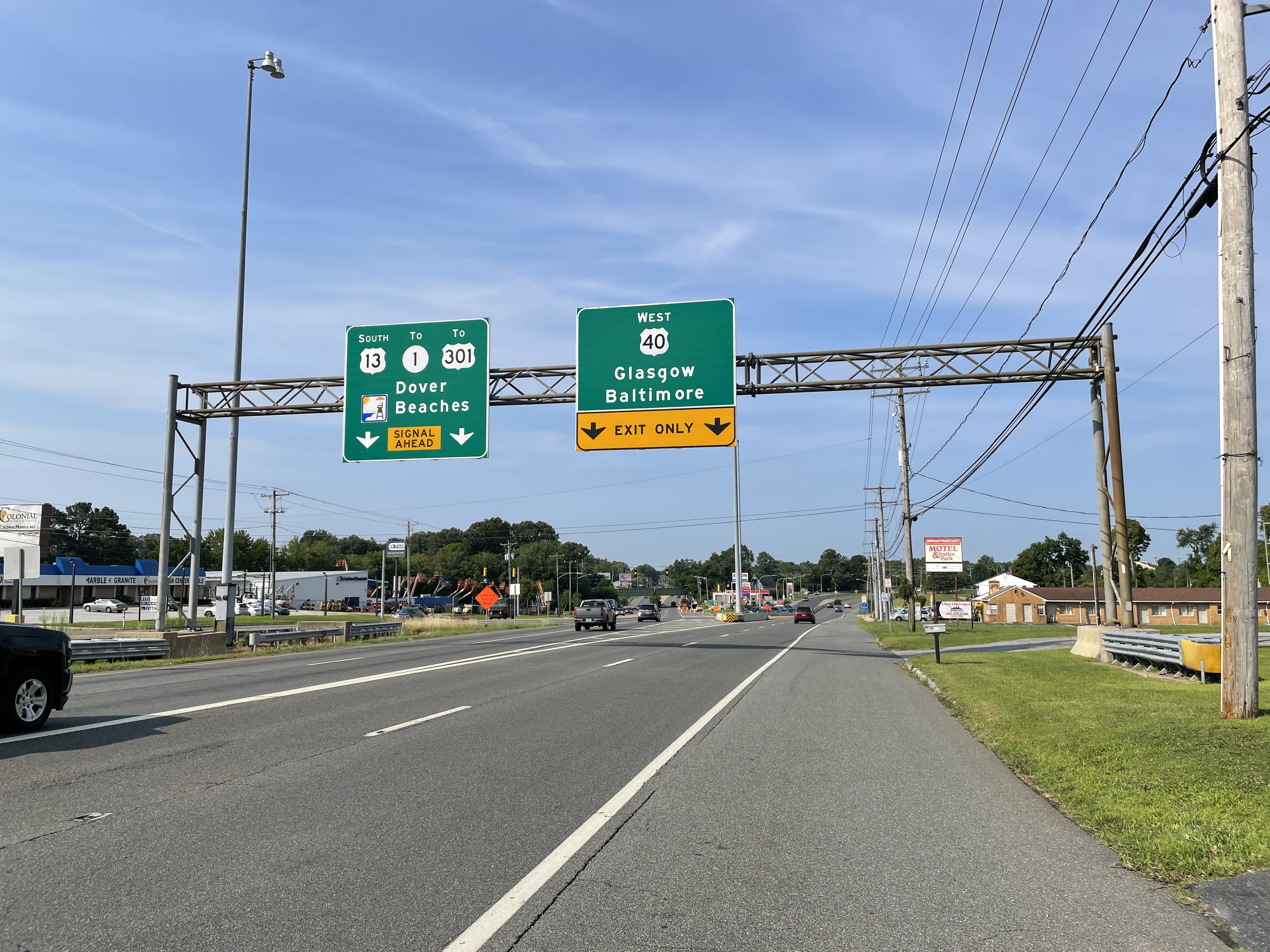
Split between US 13 southbound and US 40 westbound in State Road

At this point, US 40 joins US 13 and the roadway continues northeast as an eight-lane highway. The road runs through commercial areas, coming to an intersection with DE 273 in Hares Corner. At this point, DE 9 Truck splits from US 13/US 40 by heading east along DE 273. Past this intersection, US 13/US 40 becomes North Dupont Highway and passes between Wilmington Airport to the northwest and businesses to the southeast as it runs along the western border of New Castle for a short distance, reaching a partial cloverleaf interchange with the southern terminus of US 202 and DE 141 at the end of the airport property. Following this, the two routes narrow to six lanes, heading to the northwest of the Main Campus of Wilmington University and running through more commercial areas in Wilmington Manor. Along this stretch, the route gains a northbound combined right turn, bus, and bicycle lane. The road loses the northbound combined right turn, bus, and bicycle lane before passing over the Jack A. Markell Trail and reaching an interchange with I-295 in Farnhurst, where US 40 splits from US 13 by heading east along I-295 toward the Delaware Memorial Bridge. This interchange also provides access from US 13 to I-95 and I-495 via I-295. Past the I-295/US 40 interchange, the highway passes east of the Delaware Department of Health and Social Services' Herman M. Holloway Sr. Campus and regains a northbound combined right turn, bus, and bicycle lane as it heads through more commercial areas in Minquadale. US 13 loses the northbound combined right turn, bus, and bicycle lane again before it reaches an interchange with I-495, with access to and from the northbound lanes of I-495 and from the southbound lanes of I-495. Immediately after this interchange, US 13 Bus. splits from US 13 to head north into downtown Wilmington.

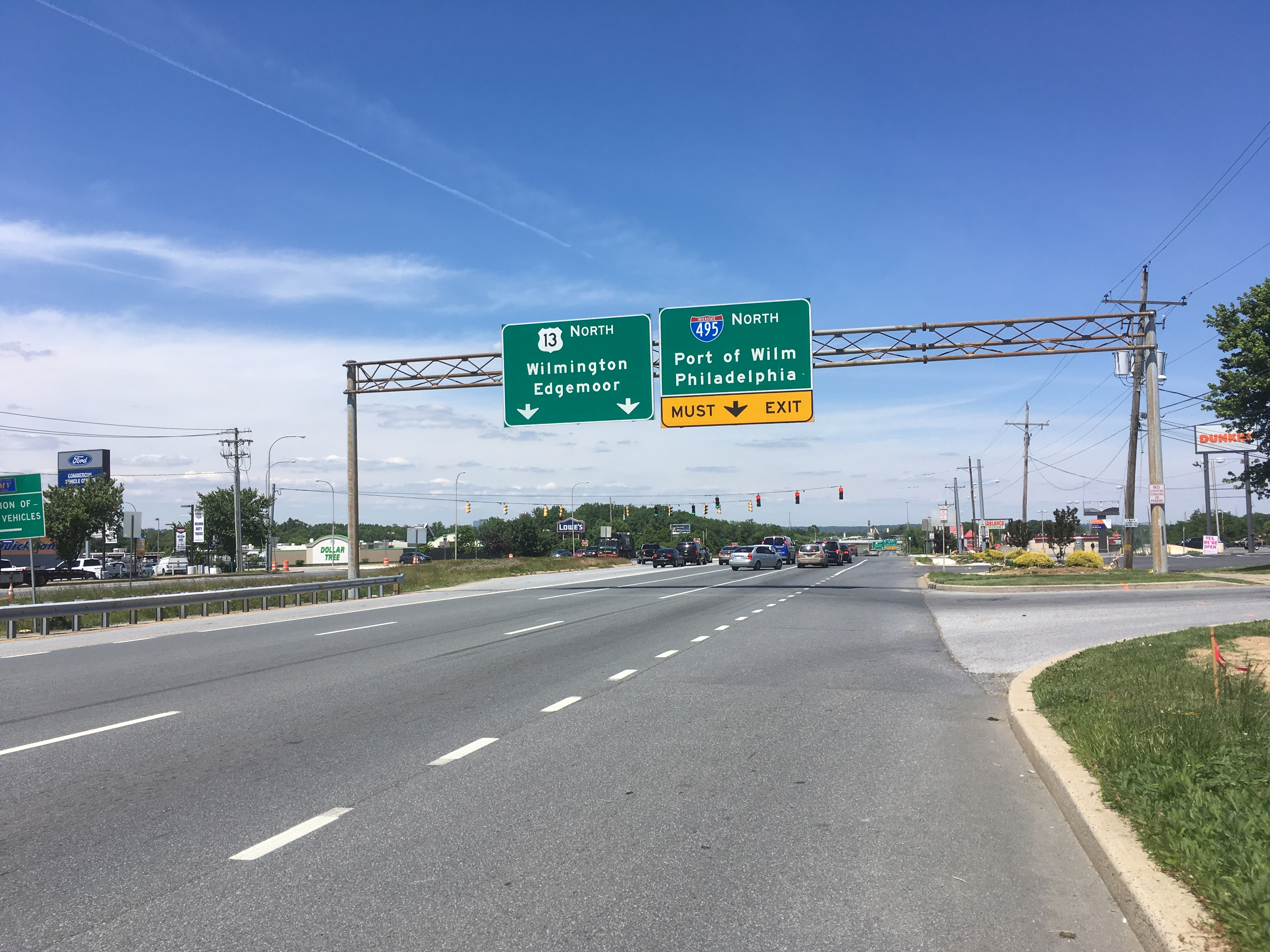
US 13 northbound approaching the interchange with I-495 in Minquadale

From here, US 13 enters Wilmington and heads northeast along four-lane undivided South Heald Street. The road curves north into industrial areas and reaches a southbound ramp providing access to DE 9 a short distance to the east. After this, the road passes over Norfolk Southern's Shellpot Secondary railroad line on a bridge and intersects DE 9. Here, US 13 becomes concurrent with DE 9 and splits into a one-way pair following New Castle Avenue northbound and South Heald Street southbound, each carrying two lanes of traffic. The one-way streets traverse areas of urban rowhouses and businesses and merge on four-lane undivided South Heald Street. Along this stretch, US 13/DE 9 intersects the northern terminus of DE 9A. Following this, the road becomes East 4th Street and heads north-northwest across the Christina River on a drawbridge. US 13/DE 9 curves northwest and passes under Amtrak's Northeast Corridor railroad line, at which point northbound US 13 splits from the road by heading northeast on North Church Street at the grade crossing of a railroad spur. A block later, the concurrency between DE 9 and southbound US 13 ends at the point where southbound US 13 joins the road from North Spruce Street. US 13 continues along this one-way pair, carrying two lanes in each direction, through the eastern part of the city as it passes more urban development, heading to the west of Old Swedes Church and Fort Christina, which are both part of First State National Historical Park, on North Church Street. At East 11th Street, US 13 becomes two-way again and heads northeast over the Brandywine Creek on four-lane undivided Northeast Boulevard. Past the bridge, the route intersects East 12th Street and continues through urban residential and business areas as a four-lane divided highway.

US 13 leaves Wilmington and runs east through commercial areas, with the median turning into a center left-turn lane. The name changes to Governor Printz Boulevard and the route heads into Edgemoor. Here, it crosses Shellpot Creek and widens back into a divided highway, passing between a shopping center to the north and Amtrak's Northeast Corridor to the south before intersecting DE 3, which provides access to I-495. Immediately after, US 13 has a ramp to northbound I-495 and a ramp from southbound I-495. From this point, the route runs between suburban residential areas along with a few businesses to the northwest and I-495 to the southeast, with the Northeast Corridor and the Delaware River on the other side of I-495. US 13 crosses Stoney Creek and passes through Holly Oak before it heads across Perkins Run and reaches Claymont. Along this stretch, there are emergency vehicle ramps connecting US 13 and I-495 in Holly Oak and Claymont. In Claymont, the route curves northwest away from I-495 and the Delaware River, passing homes before it intersects the northern terminus of US 13 Bus. Here, US 13 turns northeast onto four-lane undivided Philadelphia Pike and runs through commercial areas, passing to the northwest of Archmere Academy. The route has an interchange with I-495, at which point it becomes a divided highway, before it loses the median as it enters a mix of development and empty space, passing north of the Claymont station on SEPTA's Wilmington/Newark Line that runs along the Northeast Corridor. US 13 turns into a divided highway and crosses Naamans Creek before reaching an intersection with the eastern terminus of DE 92 south of the Robinson House. Past this, the road becomes undivided and crosses under the Northeast Corridor, gaining a median briefly as it passes under the railroad line. From here, the route heads into Sunoco's Marcus Hook Industrial Complex. US 13 continues into Pennsylvania, where it runs through more of the industrial complex in the borough of Marcus Hook.

== Rest area ==
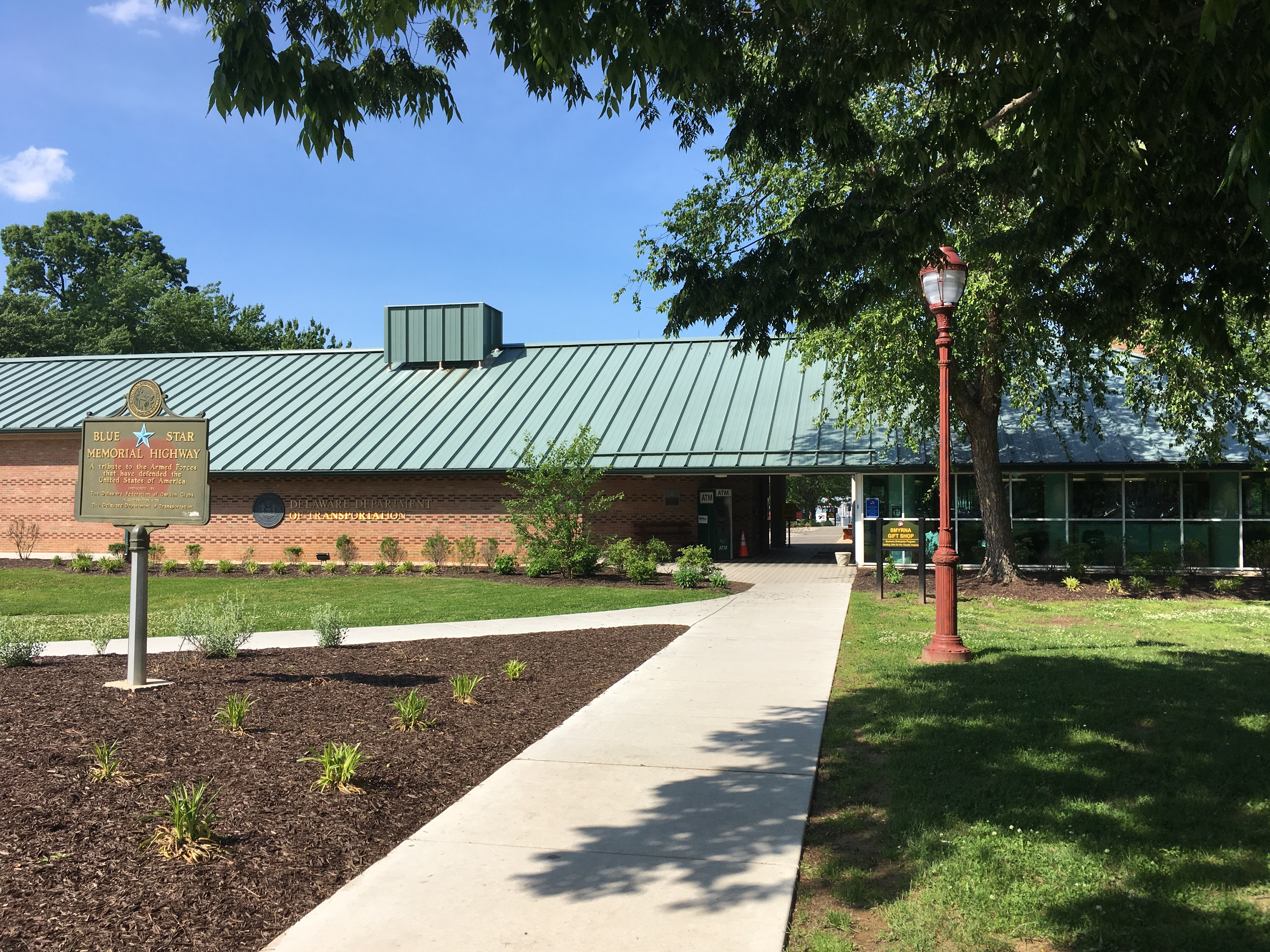
Smyrna Rest Area

The Smyrna Rest Area (officially the Chauncey O. Simpson Memorial Rest Area) is a rest area located along US 13 north of Smyrna, south of an interchange with DE 1. The 60-acre (24 ha) rest area is located adjacent to the northbound lanes of US 13 and is accessible from both directions of the highway. The rest area has restrooms, vending machines, a payphone, a visitor center, meeting room, picnic area, a pavilion, and a park and ride lot. Also located at the Smyrna Rest Area is the Delaware Highway Memorial Garden, which consists of a path with bricks bearing the names of people who died along roads in Delaware. The path serves as an alternative to roadside memorials, which are illegal in Delaware for safety reasons. The site of the Smyrna Rest Area was originally established as a picnic area in 1937 and was expanded over the years. The current rest area building opened on November 18, 1991.

== History ==
=== Predecessor roads ===
Before the numbering of the U.S. Highway System, there were many roads that ran north–south across Delaware along the rough alignment of the present route. In the 18th century, the King's Highway ran between Dover and Wilmington; south of Dover it continued southeast toward Lewes. By the later part of that century, a post road ran from Horn Town, Virginia, north across the Delmarva Peninsula. The road ran between Dover and Wilmington, where it continued northeast to the Pennsylvania border and headed toward Philadelphia. In 1813, the Wilmington and Philadelphia Turnpike Company was chartered to build a turnpike running from the Brandywine Bridge in Wilmington northeast to the Pennsylvania border, where the roadway would continue to Philadelphia. A 3.75-mile (6.04 km) long portion of the road near Wilmington was finished in 1816 with the remainder completed in 1823. With the Federal Aid Road Act of 1916, the Philadelphia Pike was to be improved by the state. The Philadelphia Pike was upgraded to a state highway by 1920. The Philadelphia Pike was designated a branch of Lincoln Highway and part of the Capitol Trail in the 1910s, which continued west of Wilmington to Newark and the Maryland border along the present-day DE 2 corridor.

=== Construction of state highways ===
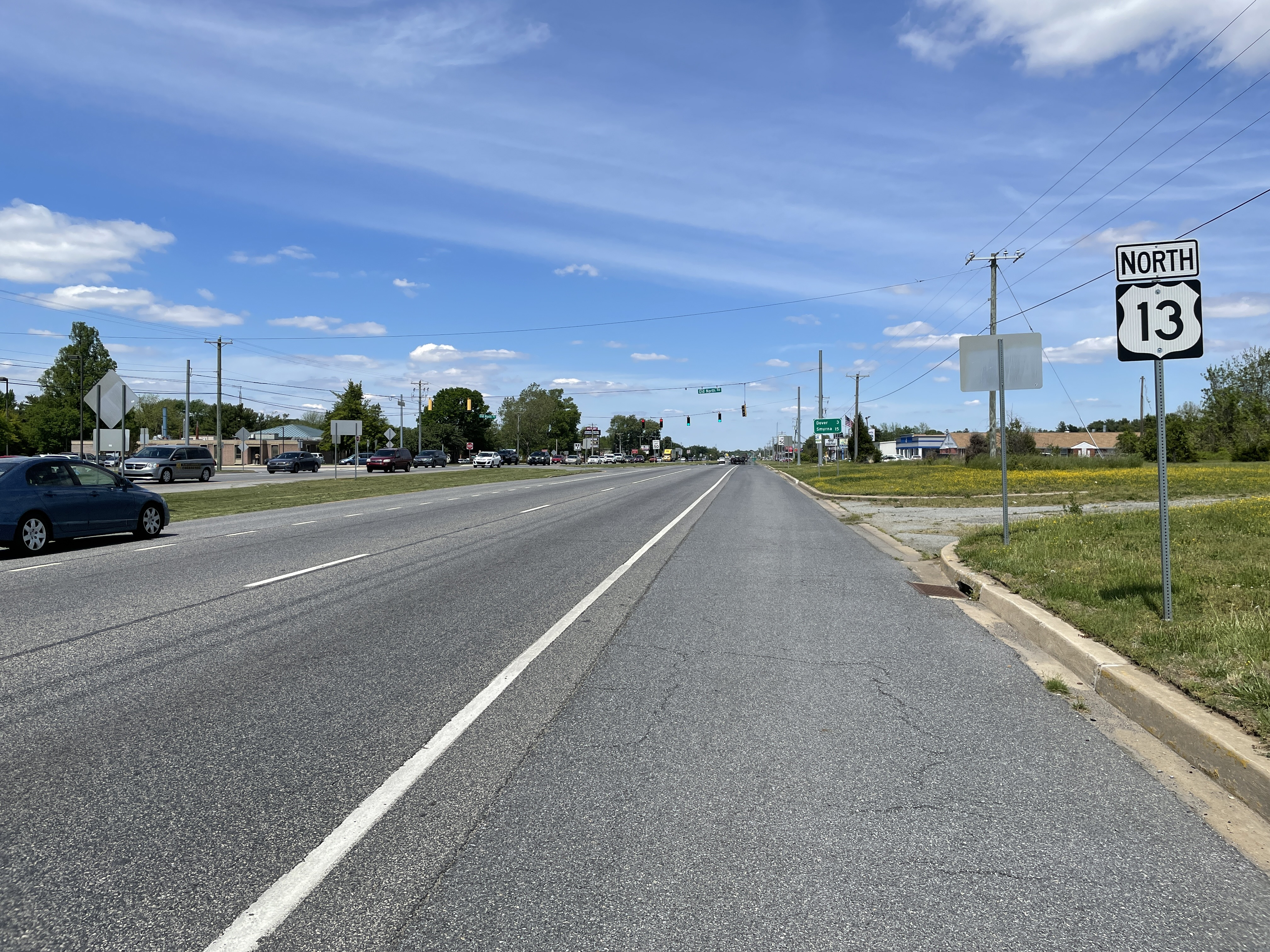
US 13 northbound past DE 10 in Camden

The portion of US 13 between Dover and Wilmington was built as part of the DuPont Highway. The DuPont Highway was proposed in 1908 by Thomas Coleman DuPont as a modern road that was to run from Selbyville north to Wilmington as part of a philanthropic measure. This roadway was planned to improve travel and bring economic development to Kent and Sussex counties. The DuPont Highway was to be modeled after the great boulevards of Europe and was to have a 200-foot (61 m) wide right-of-way consisting of a 40-foot (12 m) wide roadway for automobiles flanked by dual trolley lines, 30-foot (9.1 m) wide roadways for heavy vehicles, 15-foot (4.6 m) wide unpaved roadways for horses, and sidewalks. Utilities were to be buried underground below the horse roadways. The highway was also to include agricultural experimental stations and monuments for future surveying. Trolley revenues would help pay for the construction of the roadway. After portions of the DuPont Highway were built, these portions were planned to be turned over to the state at no charge.

In 1911, the Coleman DuPont Road, Inc., was established and construction on the highway began. By 1912, construction was interrupted by litigation challenging both the constitutionality of the law establishing the road building corporation and the need for DuPont to acquire such a large right-of-way. DuPont would narrow the proposed right-of-way to 100 feet (30 m) in order to compromise with opponents of the highway in addition to offering landowners whose properties were affected by the highway five times the assessed value of the land five years after the highway was completed. The DuPont Highway would end up being built on a 60-foot (18 m) alignment with a 32-foot (9.8 m) wide roadway. The length of the DuPont Highway between Selbyville and Wilmington was completed in 1923, with one of the final portions to be completed at the Drawyers Creek north of Odessa. A ceremony marking the completion of the highway was held in Dover on July 2, 1924. The completion of the DuPont Highway improved transportation between northern and southern Delaware and would lead to the expansion of state highways in Delaware.

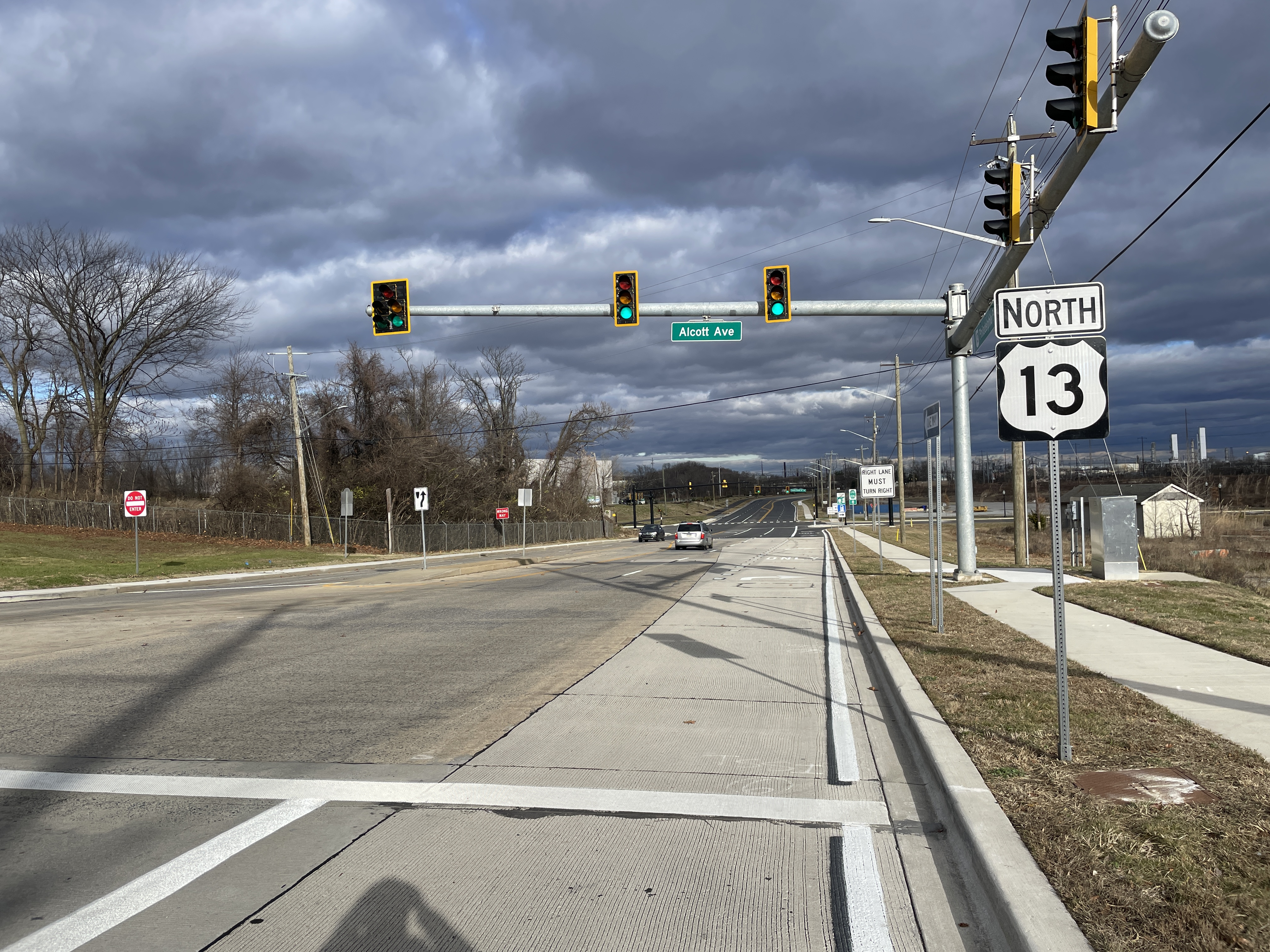
US 13 northbound past I-495 in Claymont

Work also took place on constructing a state highway running from the Maryland border in Delmar north to Dover. By 1920, most of the highway in Sussex County had been completed with the exceptions of a portion north of Laurel and a portion north of Bridgeville. In Kent County, the state highway was completed between the Sussex County border and Farmington. The portion between Farmington and Woodside was under contract by 1920 while the portion between Woodside and Dover was under proposal. By 1924, the entire length of the state highway between Delmar and Dover was completed. A bascule bridge over the Nanticoke River in Seaford was completed in March 1925. In 1925, recommendations were made to improve the South Market Street Causeway over the Christina River in Wilmington, which included a new bridge over the river. Construction on the drawbridge began in May 1926. In 1927, the new drawbridge, the four-lane South Market Street Bridge, opened over the Christina River on South Market Street in Wilmington, replacing a previous drawbridge that was only two lanes wide.

With the proposal of the U.S. Highway System in 1925, US 13 was planned as one of three routes to pass through Delaware, running from the Maryland border in Delmar via Dover and Wilmington to the Pennsylvania border in Claymont. US 13 was designated on November 11, 1926. US 13 followed the Cape Charles Route between the Maryland border in Delmar and Dover, the DuPont Highway between Dover and Wilmington, Market Street through Wilmington, and the Philadelphia Pike between Wilmington and the Pennsylvania border in Claymont. Between the Maryland border and US 40 (now DE 273) in Hares Corner, US 13 was part of the Ocean Highway, an Atlantic coastal highway stretching from Jacksonville, Florida, north to New Brunswick, New Jersey, that served as the quickest route between the New York City area and Florida before the introduction of the Interstate Highway System. US 13 is one of only four U.S. Routes that form the highway and Delaware was one of the states that participated in the highway's formation. US 13 originally passed through Dover on State Street from Coopers Corner south of Dover to north of Silver Lake. In 1930, US 13 was rerouted to follow a reconstructed Governors Avenue through Dover, with US 113 extended north along State Street from its previous northern terminus at Coopers Corner to end at US 13 at the intersection of Governors Avenue and State Street south of Silver Lake.

=== Widening and improvements ===
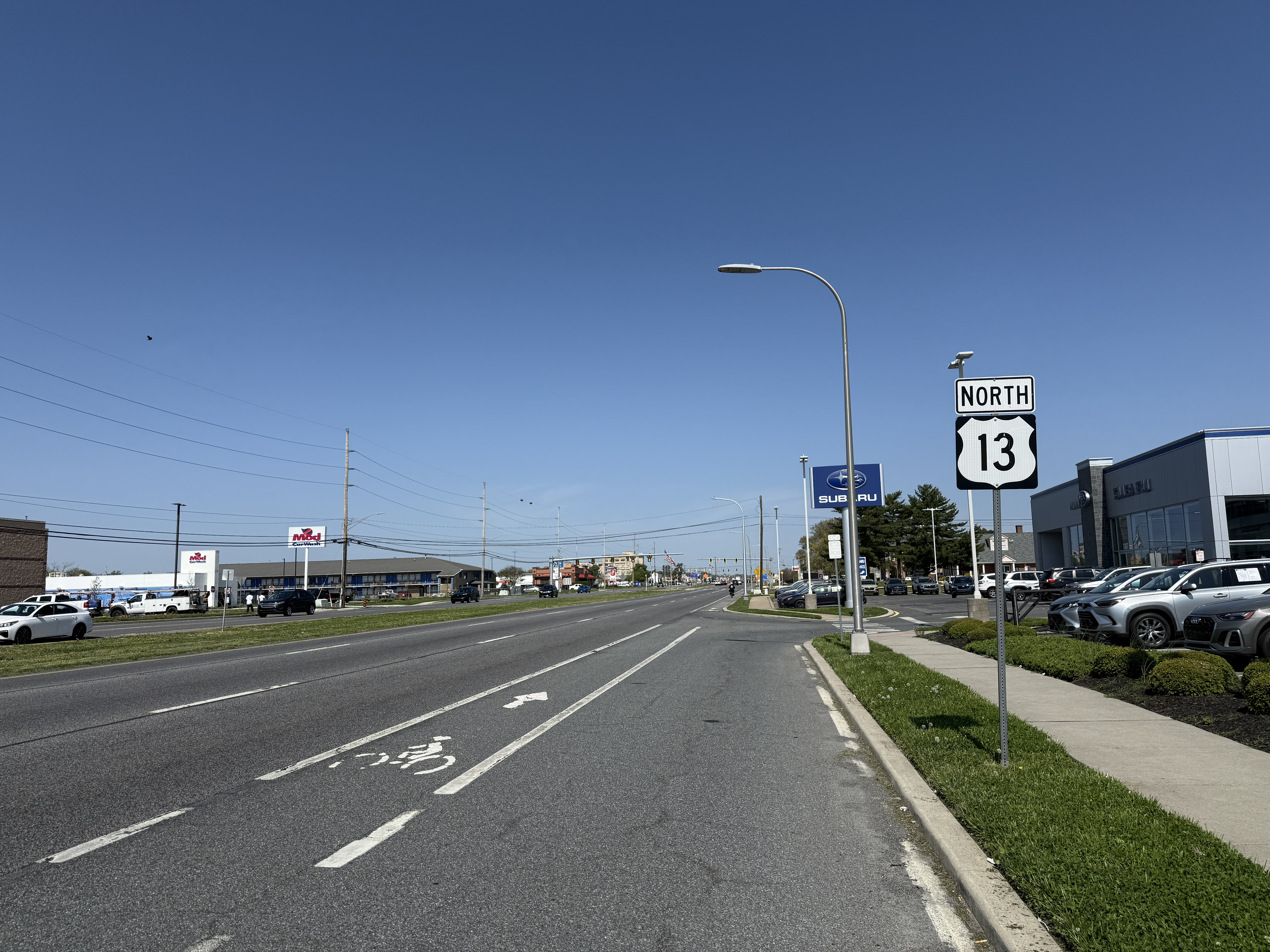
US 13 northbound in Dover

The portion of the DuPont Highway between Dover and Wilmington saw increased traffic from connecting interstate roads and summer travelers, prompting the Delaware State Highway Department (DSHD) to consider widening the highway in 1925. A year later, the department suggested the Philadelphia Pike be widened along with the DuPont Highway between State Road and Wilmington. This proposal included widening the bridge over a Pennsylvania Railroad line (now the Jack A. Markell Trail) in Farnhurst that was built in 1902. US 13 was widened to four lanes between State Road and Wilmington and between Shellpot Park and Bellevue Quarry along the Philadelphia Pike in 1927. The same year, the department recommended expanding the road between St. Georges and State Road into a divided highway. In 1928, the widening of Philadelphia Pike was completed. In 1929, the portion of the highway between St. Georges and State Road was widened into a divided highway. The department recommended widening the part of US 13 between Delmar and Dover in 1930 as it was one of the main routes across the Delmarva Peninsula. In addition, plans began to widen the route into a divided highway between Drawyers Creek north of Odessa and St. Georges. The divided highway portion of US 13 between Drawyers Creek and St. Georges was completed in September 1931. Also, work on widening the route to a divided highway between Fieldsboro and Drawyers Creek and from State Road to Wilmington began. The same year, recommendations began to extend the divided highway portion of US 13 south to Dover.

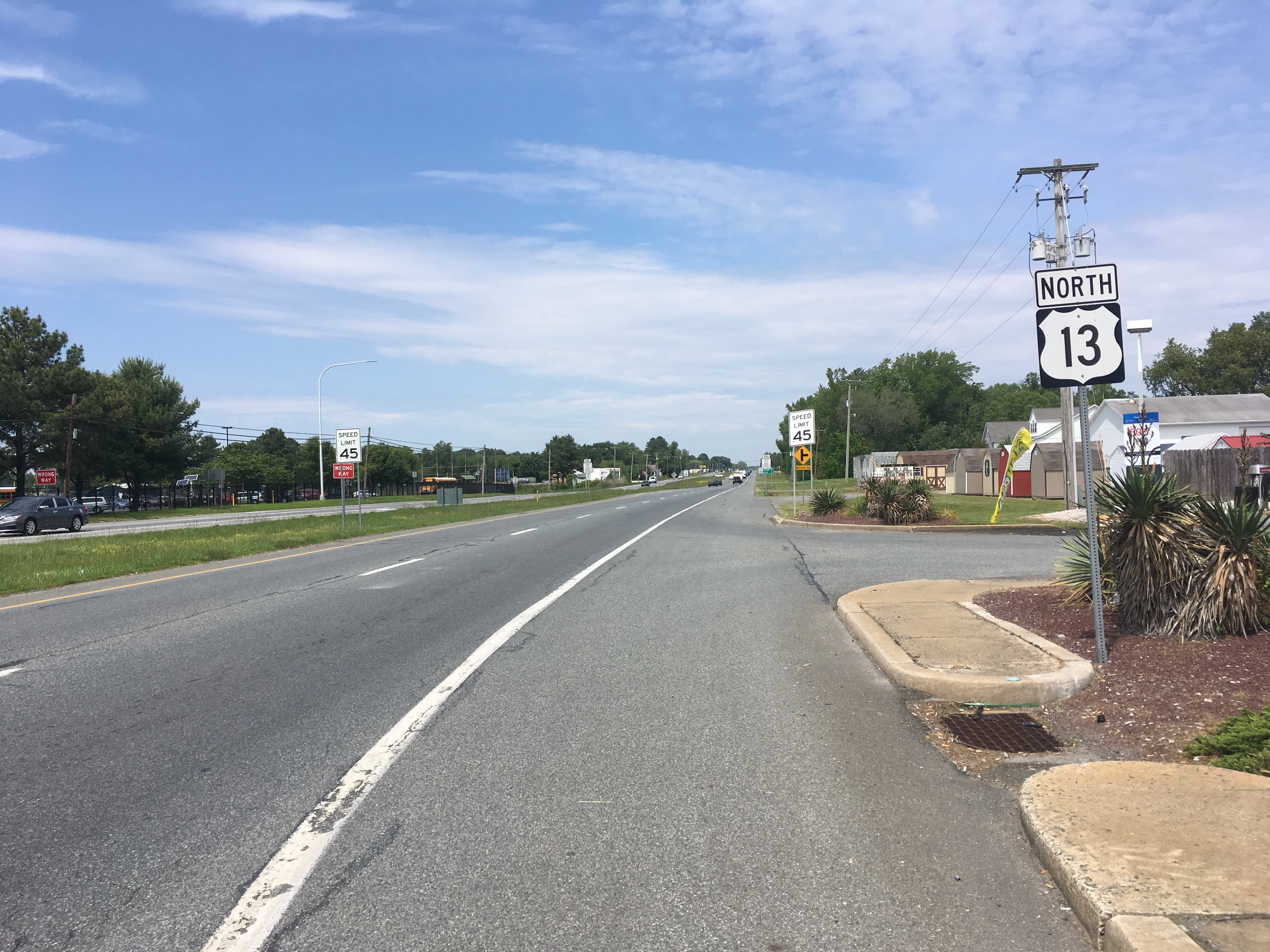
US 13 northbound past DE 12 in Felton

In 1932, the portion of US 13 between Felton and Dover was widened. In addition, the divided highway between Reynolds' Corner and Drawyers Creek was completed in September and work began on widening US 13 into a divided highway between Smyrna and Reynolds' Corner. The completion of the divided highway between State Road and Wilmington was slated for summer 1933. This widening project included widening the bridge over the Pennsylvania Railroad in Farnhurst. In 1933, the divided highway portion of US 13 was extended south to Smyrna while the portion between Dover and Smyrna was under contract. The same year, the remainder of US 13 south of Dover was widened. The divided highway portion between Dover and Smyrna was finished on September 22, 1934, marking the completion of widening US 13 between Dover and Wilmington into a divided highway. At the time, US 13 between Dover and Wilmington was the best superhighway and the longest stretch of divided highway in the world.

In 1937, the narrow crossing of Silver Lake along State Street in Dover was replaced with a new, wider bridge. On July 18, 1938, the grade crossing with the Reading Railroad (now abandoned) and the Pennsylvania Railroad (now Norfolk Southern's Shellpot Secondary) on South Market Street in Wilmington was eliminated with the opening of a bridge over the railroad tracks. On January 10, 1939, the S.S. Waukegan struck and destroyed the bridge carrying US 13 over the Chesapeake & Delaware Canal in St. Georges, killing the bridge tender. The destruction of the bridge led to detours for US 13 along smaller roads. Plans were made to construct a high-level crossing of the canal. Work on acquiring the right-of-way for the new bridge took place in 1940. Construction of the bridge occurred in 1941. The replacement steel truss St. Georges Bridge over the canal opened on January 31, 1942. This bridge was the first four-lane crossing of the Chesapeake & Delaware Canal.

In 1950, recommendations were made by the chief engineer of the DSHD to widen US 13 into a divided highway between Delmar and Dover. The divided highway was completed from Hearne's Mill north to just south of Greenwood in 1952. The highway bypassed Bridgeville to the east, rerouting US 13 off Main Street in that town. In 1953, the divided highway portion of US 13 was built around Seaford. The divided highway was completed between the Maryland border in Delmar and Hearne's Mill and from Harrington to Dover in 1954. The new alignment of US 13 between Delmar and Hearne's Mill was built further to the east, with the former two-lane alignment running through Delmar, Laurel, Blades, and Seaford becoming US 13 Alt. The bypassed two-lane alignment between Canterbury and Camden was also designated as US 13 Alt. In 1956, work was underway in widening US 13 into a divided highway between south of Greenwood and Harrington. The widening of this portion of US 13 was finished in 1957, completing widening US 13 to a divided highway between Delmar and Wilmington. By 1957, the former alignment of US 13 in Bridgeville along Main Street was designated US 13 Alt. (now US 13 Bus.) while US 13 Alt. between Delmar and Hearne's Mill was decommissioned.

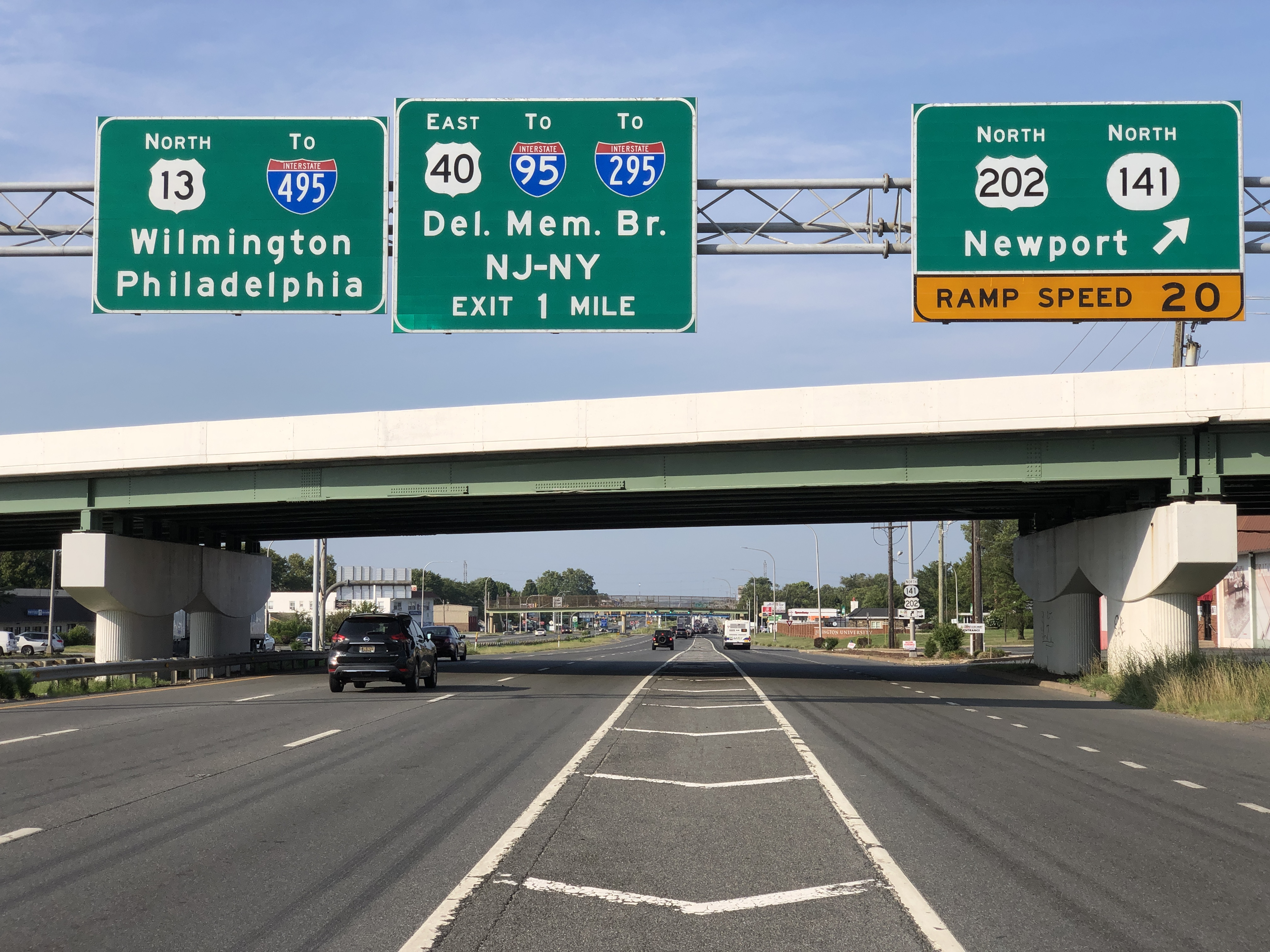
US 13 northbound/US 40 eastbound at US 202/DE 141 interchange in Wilmington Manor

The alignment of US 13 in Wilmington has been shifted multiple times to improve traffic flow. By 1932, US 13 was split into the one-way pair of French Street northbound and Market Street southbound in the downtown area. Both directions of the route was shifted to use French Street by 1936. In 1952, a new bridge over the Christina River, the Walnut Street Bridge, was proposed to link Walnut Street in the downtown area with the Dupont Parkway section of US 13 south of the city. Under this plan, the Walnut Street Bridge would be used for northbound traffic while the South Market Street Bridge would be used for southbound traffic. By this time, US 13 was routed on a one-way pair in the downtown area, using Walnut Street northbound and French Street southbound. A year later, the Walnut Street Bridge project was under contract. Construction on the project began in 1955. Construction of the Walnut Street Extension, which included the drawbridge, approach roads, and a new bridge under the Pennsylvania Railroad, now Amtrak's Northeast Corridor, was completed in 1957. As a result, US 13 was split into the one-way pair of South Walnut Street northbound and South Market Street southbound between the south end of the city and downtown.

Construction on an interchange with the Delaware Memorial Bridge approach at Farnhurst began on July 12, 1950. On August 16, 1951, the Delaware Memorial Bridge opened to traffic. US 40 was rerouted to use the new Delaware Memorial Bridge to cross the Delaware River, being realigned to follow US 13 north from Hares Corner to Farnhurst. Upgrades to the Farnhurst interchange were finished in July 1961 that provided a connection to the Delaware Turnpike (I-95) that opened on November 14, 1963. In 1954, there were plans to replace the intersection with DE 41/DE 141 in Basin Corner with a modified cloverleaf interchange in an effort to reduce traffic congestion. Construction on the interchange began in September of that year. The interchange between US 13/US 40/US 202 and DE 41/DE 141 was completed in 1956. Plans were made to widen the Philadelphia Pike to a four-lane road between Bellevue Road and Claymont in 1954. The widening project was completed in 1956.

In 1961, the concrete bridge carrying southbound US 13 over the Drawyer Creek north of Odessa was closed due to deterioration from the tidal waters of the creek, with plans for a new bridge made. Two years later, the southbound lanes were moved to the new bridge over the creek, following a straighter alignment.

=== Bypasses of Dover and Wilmington ===
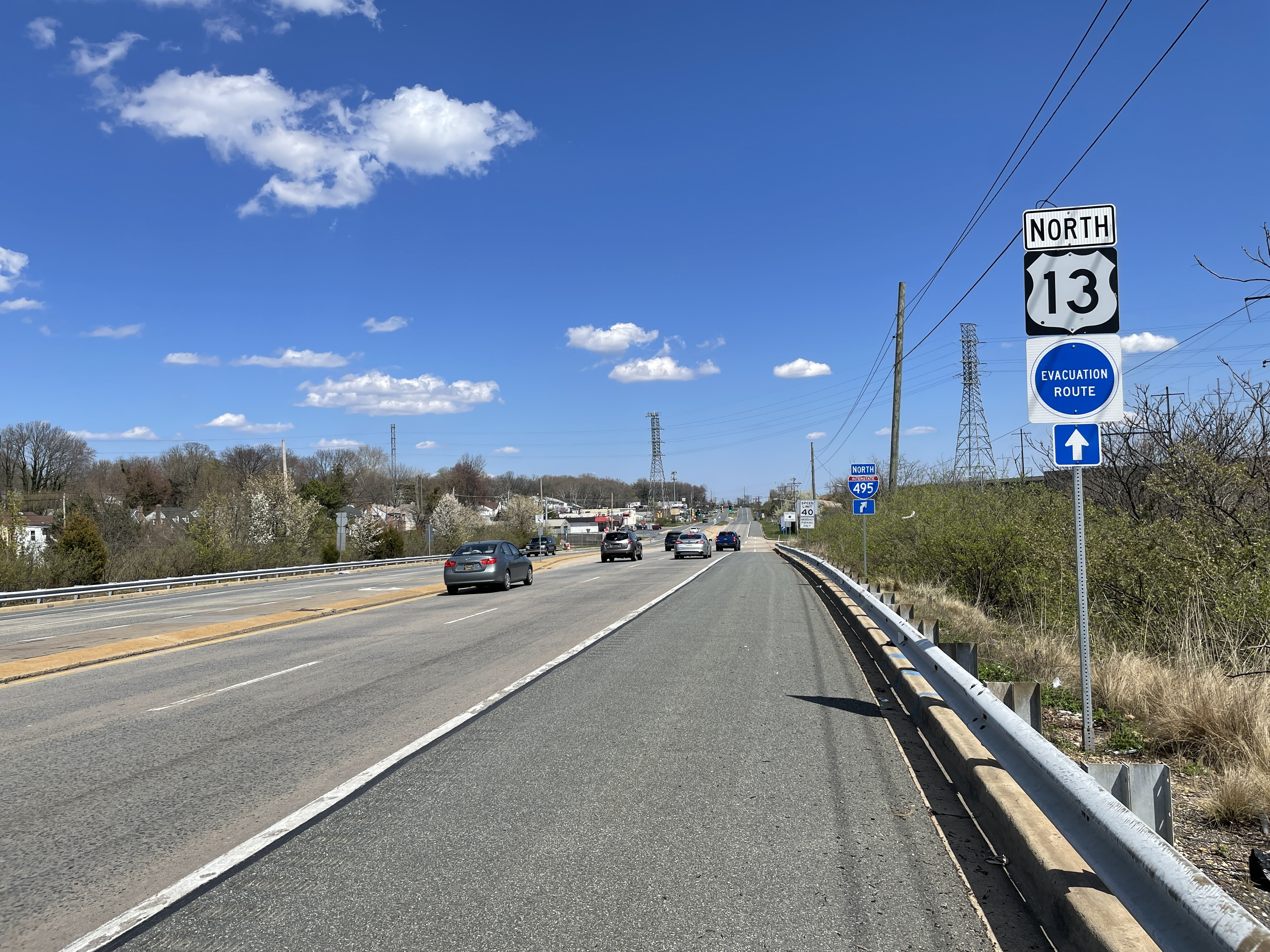
US 13 northbound past DE 3 in Edgemoor

Plans were made in 1918 for a bypass to the east of downtown Wilmington for through traffic, avoiding Market Street. The bypass would utilize Heald Street, Church and Spruce streets, and would construct Northeast Boulevard heading northeast from the Eleventh Street Bridge. The bypass was needed as Philadelphia Pike had steep grades that were difficult for trucks at the time. In 1934, the state highway department began work on this bypass. Among them was the improvement of Church and Spruce streets by widening and paving them. In addition, the Northeast Boulevard was built, running from the Eleventh Street Bridge over the Brandywine Creek northeast to Edgemoor Road in Edgemoor. Construction began this year on an extension of the road northeast to Holly Oak. The following year, the Northeast Boulevard was completed between Edgemoor and Holly Oak. The construction of the Northeast Boulevard led to increased residential and industrial development along the route. In the later part of 1936, construction began on the portion of the Wilmington bypass along Heald Street along with Northeast Boulevard (renamed Governor Printz Boulevard) between Holly Oak and Claymont. Both of these projects were finished in fall 1937 and completed a bypass of the portion of US 13 through Wilmington. This bypass route was designated as US 13 Alt. in 1939. In 1939, construction was authorized to widen Governor Printz Boulevard into a divided highway. The widening of the road to a divided highway was completed in 1940. In 1942, a bridge was completed on Heald Street that eliminated the grade crossing with a Pennsylvania Railroad line. US 13 Alt. was widened to four lanes between 11th Street and 30th Street in Wilmington in 1956. In 1970, US 13 was rerouted to bypass downtown Wilmington on the US 13 Alt. alignment while US 13 Bus. was designated onto the former US 13 alignment from the southern border of Wilmington north to Claymont.

In 1935, the portion of present-day US 13 between Bay Road and North State Street was built as part of a realigned US 113. In 1950, a contract was awarded to build a bypass of Dover, with construction soon following. The divided highway bypass for US 13 to the east of downtown Dover was completed in April 1952, rerouting US 13 off Governors Avenue and North State Street through Dover. This bypass route would run concurrent with US 113 between Bay Road and North State Street. The former alignment of the route through Dover along Governors Avenue and North State Street was designated US 13 Alt. by 1959. The US 113 concurrency was removed from US 13 in 1966; this was approved by the American Association of State Highway and Transportation Officials (AASHTO) in 1974 along with the rerouting of US 113 Alt. to follow the route between South State Street and US 113. US 113 Alt. was removed from US 13 in 2004 as part of the truncation of US 113 from Dover to Milford.

=== Relief Route ===
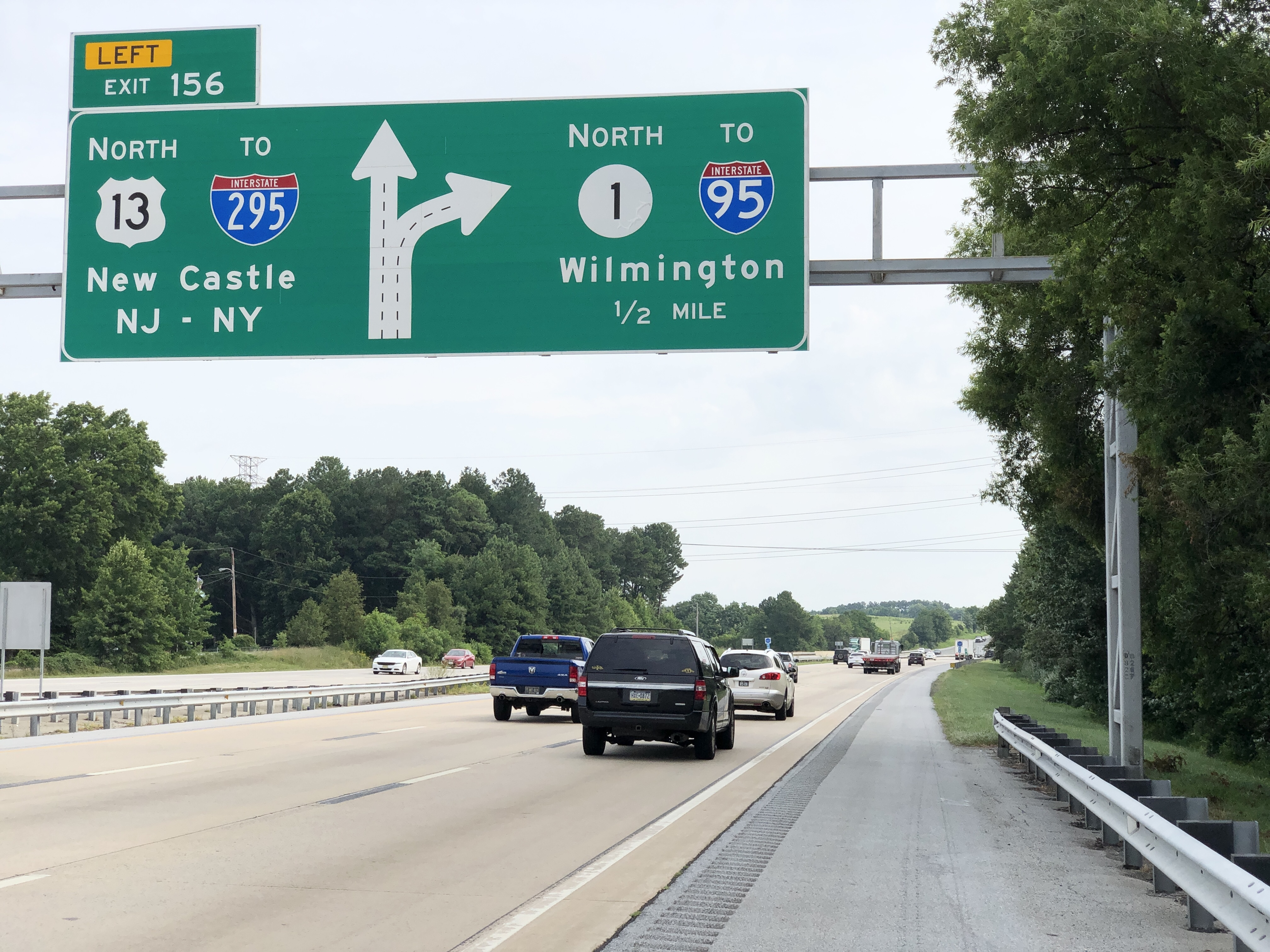
US 13 northbound approaching the split with DE 1 northbound in Tybouts Corner

Between 1958 and 1971, studies were conducted for a bypass of the segment of US 13 through Dover along with a connector between Dover and Frederica. The proposed routing began at US 113 and DE 12 north of Frederica and continued northwest to Woodside, where it was planned to cross US 13. From here, the bypass was to run to the west of Dover and head north to its terminus at US 13 north of Cheswold. As part of planning of the Dover Bypass, an archaeological survey had to be conducted along part of the proposed route between 1972 and 1975. By 1976, construction of the Dover Bypass was postponed indefinitely. From 1971 to 1978, a north–south extension of the Delaware Turnpike (I-95) between Wilmington and Dover was studied. In 1983, studies began for a "Relief Route" of US 13 between Dover and Wilmington. The new highway was proposed in order to relieve US 13 of traffic heading to the Delaware Beaches in the summer. Prior to the beginning of construction, an archaeological survey was conducted along the proposed route of the freeway in 1986. The same year, plans were unveiled for the route, which would begin at US 113 south of Dover and head north to US 13 in Tybouts Corner. The Relief Route would cross US 13 several times, passing to the east of Dover and Smyrna and to the west of Odessa. The US 13 Relief Route was designated DE 1 in 1988, keeping US 13 on its original alignment. DE 1 was extended north from Milford to Tybouts Corner in 1988, following US 13 between US 113 in Dover and Tybouts Corner.

As part of building DE 1, the Puncheon Run Connector was proposed to provide a connection between DE 1 and US 13 in the southern part of Dover. The original plan for the connector in 1987 called for upgrading US 13 into a freeway from Woodside north to Dover, with interchanges at DE 10 in Camden and Webbs Lane in Dover. In 1992, plans for the freeway upgrade to US 13 between Woodside and Dover were dropped. On December 21, 1993, DE 1 was completed between US 113 at Dover Air Force Base and US 13 north of Smyrna, with DE 1 rerouted off US 13 between Dover and Smyrna.

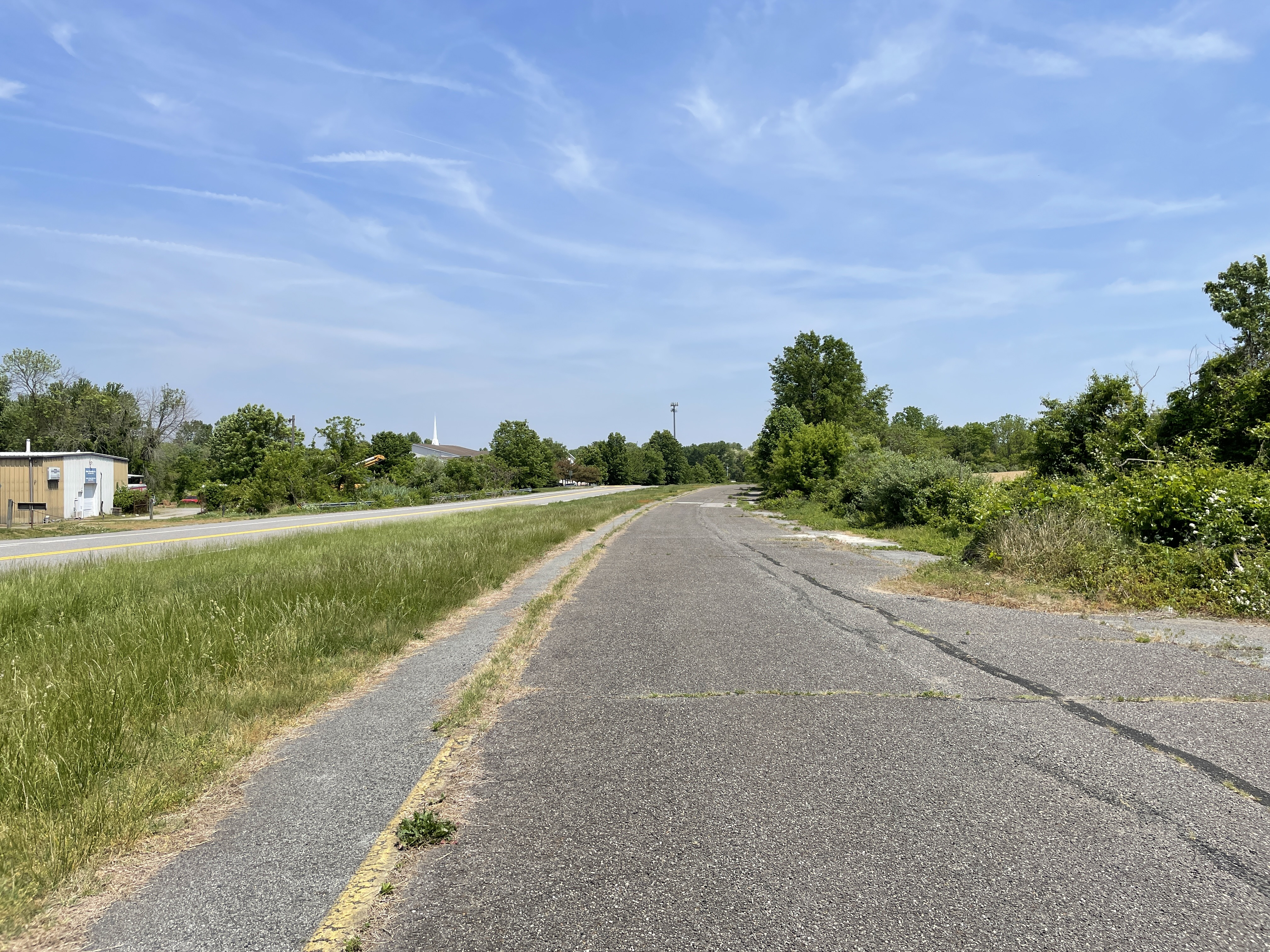
Former divided highway alignment of US 13 near Delaware City that was bypassed when DE 1 was built and US 13 rerouted to follow DE 1. The southbound lanes serve as two-lane undivided Old South Dupont Highway while the northbound lanes are abandoned.

In December 1995, the section of DE 1 between US 13 in St. Georges and US 13 in Tybouts Corner opened, which included the Chesapeake & Delaware Canal Bridge (now called the Senator William V. Roth Jr. Bridge). Following the completion of this segment, DE 1 was rerouted off the surface alignment of US 13 that crossed the St. Georges Bridge. In addition, US 13 was rerouted to follow the new DE 1 between the DE 72 interchange and Tybouts Corner. Construction of the new DE 1 had severed US 13 south of Tybouts Corner, with part of the former alignment north of the DE 7 intersection becoming a two-lane road called Old South Dupont Highway using the southbound lanes, with the northbound lanes abandoned, while the section south of there became an extended DE 7 to the intersection with US 13 and DE 72. In building DE 1 across the Chesapeake & Delaware Canal, there were initially plans to demolish the aging St. Georges Bridge that carried US 13 over the canal. The plan drew concerns from residents in St. Georges who feared the community would be split in half. The St. Georges Bridge was instead kept and was refurbished. A southbound exit and northbound entrance at US 13 south of the Chesapeake & Delaware Canal Bridge along DE 1 was built as required by federal legislation that gave the state $115 million toward construction of the new canal bridge.

The segment of DE 1 between US 13 south of Odessa and US 13 in St. Georges opened in November 1999. DE 1 was subsequently rerouted off US 13 between those two points. The construction of the final segment of DE 1 between Smyrna and Odessa resulted in a portion of US 13 south of Odessa being shifted further east as DE 1 would be built on top of the road. A service road would serve properties on the southbound side of US 13. In October 2001, northbound US 13 was realigned to the new alignment south of Odessa in order to build DE 1 in that area. In May 2002, US 13 was shifted to a new southbound alignment south of Odessa, with the former portion of the route in that area becoming a service road known as Harris Road. The final section of DE 1 between Smyrna and Odessa opened on May 21, 2003. As a result, DE 1 was moved off US 13 between Smyrna and Odessa.

=== 21st century ===
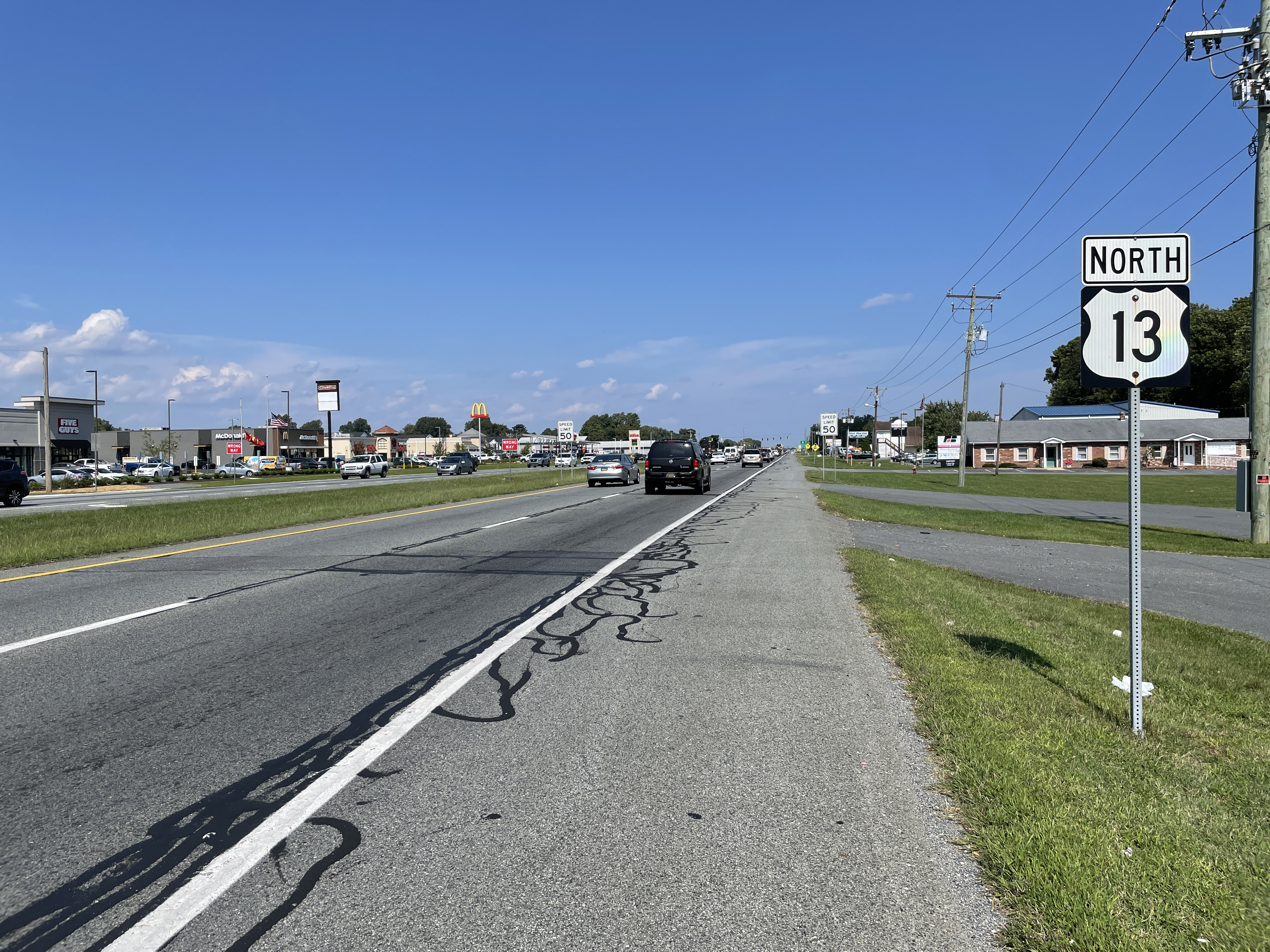
US 13 northbound in Camden

In June 2007, a $15 million project began that realigned the intersection between US 13 and DE 404/US 13 Bus./DE 404 Bus. in Bridgeville from a skewed intersection to a perpendicular intersection and built service roads on both sides of US 13. The project was intended to improve safety at the intersection, which saw a high accident rate due to its design. Work on the project was completed on May 21, 2009, with DelDOT secretary Carolann Wicks and President of Commissioners for the Town of Bridgeville William Jefferson in attendance at a ceremony. On February 29, 2016, construction began on a superstreet intersection at DE 30 (Dorothy Road/Whitesville Road); this project was completed on May 19 of that year.

On December 24, 2018, the ramp from US 13 to northbound DE 1 in St. Georges moved further south to the Biddles Corner mainline toll plaza as part of the project constructing the US 301 toll road.

There are plans to widen the portion of US 13 from DE 10 Alt. in Woodside north to the Puncheon Run Connector in Dover from four lanes to six lanes.

== Major intersections ==
County	Location	mi	km	Destinations	Notes
Sussex	Delmar	0.00	0.00	US 13 south (Ocean Highway) – Salisbury; Route 54 (Line Road) – Delmar, Gumboro	Maryland state line
Sussex	Laurel	6.88	11.07	DE 24 (East 4th Street/Laurel Road) – Laurel, Millsboro	
Sussex	Laurel	8.01	12.89	US 9 east (County Seat Highway) – Georgetown, Cape May–Lewes Ferry, Beaches	Western terminus of US 9
Sussex	Blades	13.20	21.24	DE 20 east (Concord Road) – Millsboro, Bethany Beach, Fenwick Island	South end of DE 20 concurrency
Sussex	Seaford	14.04	22.60	DE 20 west (Norman Eskridge Highway) – Seaford	North end of DE 20 concurrency
Sussex	Cannon	17.30	27.84	DE 18 (Cannon Road) – Cannon, Federalsburg, Georgetown	
Sussex	Bridgeville	18.92	30.45	US 13 Bus. north / DE 404 Bus. west (South Main Street) – Bridgeville DE 404 east (Seashore Highway) – Georgetown, Lewes, Rehoboth Beach, Beaches	South end of DE 404 concurrency; southern terminus of US 13 Bus.; eastern terminus of DE 404 Bus.
Sussex	Bridgeville			US 13 Bus. south (North Main Street) – Bridgeville Historic District	Right-in/right-out intersection southbound; northern terminus of US 13 Bus.
Sussex	Bridgeville	21.43	34.49	DE 404 west (Newton Road) – Denton, Bay Bridge	North end of DE 404 concurrency
Sussex	Greenwood	24.70	39.75	DE 16 / DE 36 (Market Street/Beach Highway) – Denton, Greenwood, Milford, Ellendale	
Kent	Harrington			DE 14 Truck west (Tower Hill Road)	South end of DE 14 Truck concurrency
Kent	Harrington	32.92	52.98	DE 14 (Clark Street/Milford Harrington Highway) – Denton, Harrington, Houston, Milford	North end of DE 14 Truck concurrency; eastern terminus of DE 14 Truck
Kent	Felton	38.68	62.25	DE 12 (East Main Street/Midstate Road) – Felton, Greensboro, Frederica	
Kent	Canterbury	41.42	66.66	DE 15 south (Canterbury Road) – Canterbury, Milford	South end of DE 15 concurrency
Kent	Canterbury			US 13 Alt. north / DE 15 north (Upper King Road) – Woodside, Camden	North end of DE 15 concurrency; southern terminus of US 13 Alt.
Kent	Woodside			DE 10 Alt. (Walnut Shade Road) – Woodside, Petersburg, Rising Sun	
Kent	Camden	46.25	74.43	DE 10 (Camden Wyoming Avenue/West Lebanon Road) – Camden, Wyoming, Rising Sun, Dover AFB	
Kent	Camden	46.93	75.53	US 13 Alt. south (Old Camden Road) – Camden, Wyoming	Northern terminus of US 13 Alt.; access from US 13 Alt. to northbound US 13 provided by Caboose Road
Kent	Rodney Village	47.28	76.09	US 13 Alt. north (South Governors Avenue)	Southern terminus of US 13 Alt.; no access from southbound US 13 Alt. to northbound US 13
Kent	Dover	47.85	77.01	Puncheon Run Connector to DE 1 Toll / I-95 – Wilmington, Delaware Memorial Bridge	No access from southbound US 13 to Puncheon Run Connector
Kent	Dover	49.86	80.24	Bay Road south to DE 1 – Dover AFB, Beaches	Access from southbound US 13 to southbound Bay Road and from northbound Bay Road to northbound US 13
Kent	Dover	50.16	80.72	DE 8 (East Division Street) – Hartly, Bay Bridge, Little Creek	
Kent	Dover	51.61	83.06	US 13 Alt. south (North State Street)	Northern terminus of US 13 Alt.; no access from northbound US 13 to southbound US 13 Alt.
Kent	Dover			Scarborough Road to DE 1 Toll / DE 8 – Beaches, Smyrna, Wilmington, West Dover Industrial Area	DE 1 exit 104
Kent	Cheswold	55.57	89.43	DE 42 (Main Street/Fast Landing Road) – Cheswold, Kenton, Leipsic	
Kent	Smyrna			DE 1 Toll – Dover, Beaches, Wilmington	DE 1 exit 114
Kent	Smyrna	61.36	98.75	DE 6 east (East Commerce Street)	South end of DE 6 concurrency
Kent	Smyrna	61.65	99.22	DE 6 west / DE 300 west (East Glenwood Avenue)	North end of DE 6 concurrency; eastern terminus of DE 300
New Castle	Smyrna	64.18	103.29	DE 1 Toll – Dover, Beaches, Wilmington, Middletown	DE 1 exit 119
New Castle		67.65	108.87	DE 71 north (Summit Bridge Road) – Townsend, Middletown	Southern terminus of DE 71
New Castle	Odessa	72.97	117.43	DE 299 (Main Street) to DE 1 Toll – Middletown	
New Castle	Boyds Corner	76.12	122.50	DE 896 north (Boyds Corner Road) to US 301 south – Mt. Pleasant, Glasgow, Baltimore, Annapolis Pole Bridge Road to DE 1 Toll – Wilmington, Dover, Beaches	Southern terminus of DE 896
New Castle	St. Georges			DE 1 north to I-95 – Wilmington, Philadelphia	Access from US 13 to northbound DE 1 and from southbound DE 1 via Lorewood Grove Road to US 13; DE 1 exit 148
New Castle	St. Georges			South Main Street / Lorewood Grove Road – South St. Georges	Interchange; access via South Main Street northbound and Lorewood Grove Road southbound
New Castle	Chesapeake & Delaware Canal			St. Georges Bridge	
New Castle	St. Georges			Broad Street / North Main Street – North St. Georges	Interchange; access via Broad Street northbound and North Main Street southbound
New Castle	Wrangle Hill	81.65	131.40	DE 7 north (South Dupont Highway) DE 72 south (Wrangle Hill Road) to DE 9 – Delaware City	South end of DE 72 concurrency; southern terminus of DE 7
New Castle	Wrangle Hill	81.87	131.76	DE 1 south – Dover, Beaches DE 72 north (Wrangle Hill Road) – Newark	DE 1 exit 152; north end of DE 72 concurrency; south end of DE 1 concurrency
New Castle	Tybouts Corner	84.06	135.28	DE 1 north to I-95 – Wilmington, Baltimore	DE 1 exit 156; north end of DE 1 concurrency
New Castle	Tybouts Corner	84.70	136.31	DE 71 south (Red Lion Road)	Northern terminus of DE 71
New Castle	Tybouts Corner			DE 9 Truck south (Hamburg Road)	South end of DE 9 Truck concurrency
New Castle	State Road	87.54	140.88	US 40 west (Pulaski Highway) – Glasgow, Baltimore	No access from northbound US 13 to westbound US 40; south end of US 40 concurrency
New Castle	Hares Corner	88.58	142.56	DE 273 / DE 9 Truck north (Christiana Road/Frenchtown Road) – Christiana, Newark, New Castle	North end of DE 9 Truck concurrency
New Castle	Wilmington Manor	89.81	144.54	US 202 north / DE 141 – New Castle, Newport	US 202/DE 141 exit 1; southern terminus of US 202
New Castle	Wilmington Manor	91.10	146.61	I-295 north / US 40 east to N.J. Turnpike – Delaware Memorial Bridge, New Jersey, New York I-295 south to I-95 / I-495 – Philadelphia, Baltimore	Interchange; north end of US 40 concurrency
New Castle	Minquadale	92.92	149.54	I-495 north – Port of Wilmington, Philadelphia	I-495 exit 1; no ramp from northbound I-495 to southbound US 13 or from US 13 to southbound I-495; there is a ramp from southbound US 13 Bus. to southbound I-495
New Castle	Wilmington	92.97	149.62	US 13 Bus. north (South Walnut Street) – Wilmington	Southern terminus of US 13 Bus.
New Castle	Wilmington	94.22	151.63	DE 9 south (New Castle Avenue) – New Castle	South end of DE 9 concurrency
New Castle	Wilmington	94.42	151.95	DE 9A south (Christina Avenue)	Northern terminus of DE 9A
New Castle	Wilmington	94.72	152.44	DE 9 north (East 4th Street)	North end of DE 9 concurrency
New Castle	Edgemoor	97.22	156.46	I-495 / DE 3 north (Edgemoor Road)	Southern terminus of DE 3; I-495 exit 4A
New Castle	Claymont	101.67	163.62	US 13 Bus. south (Philadelphia Pike)	Northern terminus of US 13 Bus.
New Castle	Claymont	102.26	164.57	I-495 to I-95 north – Delaware Memorial Bridge, Port of Wilmington, Baltimore, Chester, Philadelphia	I-495 exit 5
New Castle	Claymont	102.91	165.62	DE 92 west (Naamans Road) to I-95	Eastern terminus of DE 92
New Castle	Claymont	103.33	166.29	US 13 north (Post Road) – Marcus Hook	Pennsylvania state line
1.000 mi = 1.609 km; 1.000 km = 0.621 mi: Concurrency terminus; Incomplete access

== Work cited ==
- John Milner Associates, Inc. (July 2005). Historic Context for the DuPont Highway U.S. Route 113: Kent and Sussex County, Delaware (PDF). in association with Whitman, Requardt, Inc. and Rummel, Klepper & Kahl, LLP. Dover, DE: Delaware Department of Transportation.

U.S. Route 13
Previous state: Maryland	Delaware	Next state: Pennsylvania
