= National Register of Historic Places listings in northern New Castle County, Delaware =

New Castle County, Delaware, United States, has 402 properties and districts listed on the National Register of Historic Places. Of those, 177 sites are located outside the cities of Wilmington and Newark and north of the Chesapeake and Delaware Canal and are listed here, including five sites that are further designated as National Historic Landmarks.

The locations of National Register properties and districts for which the latitude and longitude coordinates are included below may be seen in a map.

This National Park Service list is complete through NPS recent listings posted September 11, 2026.

Contents: Counties and municipalities in Delaware
Newark (New Castle) | Wilmington (New Castle) | Northern New Castle | Southern New Castle | Kent | Sussex

== Current listings ==
| | Name on the Register | Image | Date listed | Location | City or town | Description |
|---|---|---|---|---|---|---|
| 1 | African Union Church and Cemetery of Iron Hill | African Union Church and Cemetery of Iron Hill | September 9, 2021 (#100006887) | 1578 Whittaker Rd. 39°37′59″N 75°45′41″W | Pencader Hundred, Newark vicinity | |
| 2 | Aiken's Tavern Historic District | Aiken's Tavern Historic District | December 6, 1977 (#77000388) | Junction of U.S. Route 40 and Delaware Route 896; 39°36′23″N 75°44′45″W | Glasgow | |
| 3 | Air Service, Inc. Hangar at Bellanca Airfield | Air Service, Inc. Hangar at Bellanca Airfield | June 15, 2005 (#05000601) | 2 Centerpoint Blvd. 39°39′52″N 75°35′13″W | New Castle | |
| 4 | Charles Allen House | Charles Allen House | August 19, 1983 (#83001348) | 855 Canoe Rd. 39°38′46″N 75°40′40″W | Christiana | |
| 5 | Amstel House | Amstel House | May 12, 1977 (#77000386) | 2 E. 4th St. 39°39′38″N 75°33′53″W | New Castle | |
| 6 | Archmere | Archmere | September 9, 1992 (#92001143) | 3600 Philadelphia Pike; 39°48′08″N 75°27′13″W | Claymont | |
| 7 | Ardens Historic District | Ardens Historic District | May 30, 2003 (#01001245) | Orleans Rd. at Harvey Rd. 39°48′41″N 75°29′16″W | Arden | |
| 8 | James Armor House | James Armor House | August 31, 1992 (#92001141) | 3 Courtney Rd. 39°45′42″N 75°36′57″W | Christiana Hundred | |
| 9 | Armstrong Lodge No. 26, A.F. & A.M. | Armstrong Lodge No. 26, A.F. & A.M. | July 14, 1993 (#93000628) | 112–114 E. Market St. 39°42′49″N 75°36′28″W | Newport | |
| 10 | A. Armstrong Farm | A. Armstrong Farm | November 13, 1986 (#86003083) | Old Wilmington Rd. west of Brackenville Rd. 39°47′11″N 75°40′28″W | Hockessin | Farm house and barn; demolished before 2002. |
| 11 | Ashland Bridge | Ashland Bridge | March 20, 1973 (#73000506) | South of Ashland over Red Clay Creek; 39°47′54″N 75°39′28″W | Ashland | |
| 12 | Auburn Mills Historic District | Auburn Mills Historic District | January 22, 1980 (#80000939) | West of Yorklyn on Delaware Route 82 and Benge Road; 39°48′28″N 75°40′49″W | Yorklyn | |
| 13 | Bartley-Tweed Farm | Bartley-Tweed Farm | November 13, 1986 (#86003084) | 51 Fox Den Rd. 39°43′13″N 75°42′59″W | Mill Creek Hundred | |
| 14 | Beaver Valley Rock Shelter Site | Beaver Valley Rock Shelter Site | September 1, 1978 (#78000910) | Address Restricted | Brandywine Hundred | Part of the First State National Historical Park |
| 15 | Bloomfield | Bloomfield | April 8, 1982 (#82002354) | 4663 Kirkwood St. Georges Road; 39°33′20″N 75°39′23″W | St. Georges | |
| 16 | Brandywine Manufacturers Sunday School | Brandywine Manufacturers Sunday School | April 13, 1972 (#72000291) | Blacksmith Hill Rd. 39°46′44″N 75°34′35″W | Christiana Hundred | Part of the Hagley Museum |
| 17 | Brandywine Powder Mills District | Brandywine Powder Mills District | May 3, 1984 (#84000819) | Delaware Route 141 and the Brandywine River; 39°46′48″N 75°34′40″W | Christiana Hundred | Hagley Museum |
| 18 | Breck's Mill Area | Breck's Mill Area | November 5, 1971 (#71000230) | Breck's Lane and Creek Rd. 39°46′12″N 75°34′50″W | Christiana Hundred | Extends slightly into Wilmington proper |
| 19 | Brindley Farm | Brindley Farm | September 28, 1976 (#76000575) | 3510 Kennett Pike; 39°46′13″N 75°35′35″W | Christiana Hundred | |
| 20 | Jacob Broom House | Jacob Broom House | December 2, 1974 (#74000602) | 402 Dean Lane; 39°46′49″N 75°34′42″W | Christiana Hundred | |
| 21 | Buena Vista | Buena Vista | April 16, 1971 (#71000228) | 661 South DuPont Highway; 39°38′02″N 75°38′22″W | New Castle Hundred | State of Delaware retreat center |
| 22 | John Carney Agricultural Complex | John Carney Agricultural Complex | February 25, 2009 (#09000050) | 4300 Thompson Bridge Rd. 39°49′13″N 75°34′00″W | Rockland | Part of Brandywine Creek State Park |
| 23 | Carpenter-Lippincott House | Carpenter-Lippincott House | April 13, 1983 (#83001388) | 5620 Kennett Pike; 39°49′06″N 75°37′00″W | Centreville | |
| 24 | W. Casperson House | W. Casperson House | April 8, 1982 (#82002355) | 1600 Red Lion Rd. 39°35′25″N 75°40′26″W | St. Georges | |
| 25 | Centre Meeting and Schoolhouse | Centre Meeting and Schoolhouse | December 16, 1971 (#71000224) | 311 Center Meeting Rd. 39°49′13″N 75°35′58″W | Centreville | |
| 26 | Centreville Historic District | Centreville Historic District | April 13, 1983 (#83001338) | Kennett Pike and Owls Nest/Twaddell Mill Rd. 39°49′16″N 75°37′00″W | Centreville | |
| 27 | Chambers House | Chambers House | November 29, 1988 (#88003132) | 1475 Creek Road; 39°43′38″N 75°46′05″W | White Clay Creek Hundred | Nature center for White Clay Creek State Park |
| 28 | Joseph Chandler House | Joseph Chandler House | April 13, 1983 (#83001390) | 5826 Kennett Pike; 39°49′26″N 75°37′09″W | Centreville | |
| 29 | Chelsea | Chelsea | April 8, 1982 (#82002325) | 910 5th St. 39°34′37″N 75°35′56″W | Delaware City | |
| 30 | Christiana Historic District | Christiana Historic District | December 16, 1974 (#74000600) | Junction of Delaware Routes 7 and 273; 39°39′55″N 75°39′36″W | Christiana | |
| 31 | Abner Cloud House | Abner Cloud House | August 31, 1992 (#92001144) | 14 Ravine Rd. 39°48′54″N 75°28′47″W | Brandywine Hundred | |
| 32 | Cloud-Reese House | Cloud-Reese House | August 17, 2001 (#01000885) | 2202 Old Kennett Rd. 39°49′20″N 75°39′25″W | Christiana Hundred | |
| 33 | Clyde Farm Site | Clyde Farm Site | July 29, 1977 (#77000391) | Southern side of White Clay Creek, north of Interstate 95; 39°41′56″N 75°38′12″W | Stanton | Paleo-Indian archaeological site |
| 34 | Coffee Run Mission Site | Coffee Run Mission Site | April 11, 1973 (#73000509) | 6580 Lancaster Pike; 39°46′03″N 75°39′34″W | Hockessin | One structure destroyed in March 2010 following an arson. |
| 35 | Collison House | Collison House | July 14, 1993 (#93000635) | 21 N. Walnut St. 39°42′53″N 75°36′27″W | Newport | |
| 36 | Cooch's Bridge Historic District | Cooch's Bridge Historic District | April 11, 1973 (#73000528) | South of Newark off Delaware Route 896; 39°38′24″N 75°44′11″W | Pencader Hundred | |
| 37 | Correll's Farm and Lawn Supply | Correll's Farm and Lawn Supply | April 8, 1982 (#82002327) | 2440 Red Lion Road; 39°34′14″N 75°41′50″W | Kirkwood | |
| 38 | Cox-Phillips-Mitchell Agricultural Complex | Cox-Phillips-Mitchell Agricultural Complex | March 13, 2017 (#100000729) | 1651 & 1655 Old Wilmington Rd. 39°47′43″N 75°41′54″W | Hockessin | |
| 39 | Darley House | Darley House | July 2, 1973 (#73000508) | 3701 Philadelphia Pike; 39°48′18″N 75°27′15″W | Claymont | |
| 40 | Dauneport House | Dauneport House | September 8, 2022 (#100008081) | 420 Old Kennett Rd. 39°48′38″N 75°37′16″W | Wilmington vicinity | |
| 41 | Delaware Boundary Markers | Delaware Boundary Markers | February 18, 1975 (#75002101) | Delaware state boundary lines with Maryland and Pennsylvania; 39°43′20″N 75°47′19″W | Not applicable | |
| 42 | Delaware City Historic District | Delaware City Historic District | December 15, 1983 (#83003515) | Roughly bounded by the Delaware River, Dragon Creek, Delaware Route 9, and the Delaware and Chesapeake Canals; 39°34′38″N 75°35′31″W | Delaware City | |
| 43 | S. P. Dixon Farm | S. P. Dixon Farm | November 13, 1986 (#86003085) | Barley Mill and Brackenville Rds. 39°47′45″N 75°39′27″W | Ashland | Part of Ashland Farm (Henry B. du Pont IV estate) |
| 44 | Dragon Run Farm | Dragon Run Farm | April 8, 1982 (#82002328) | 2335 McCoy Rd. 39°33′47″N 75°40′23″W | Kirkwood | |
| 45 | David Eastburn Farm | David Eastburn Farm | November 13, 1986 (#86003087) | 2 Bristol Ln. 39°44′48″N 75°44′09″W | Mill Creek Hundred | |
| 46 | J. Eastburn Barn | J. Eastburn Barn | November 13, 1986 (#86003088) | Pleasant Hill Rd. southwest of Corner Ketch Rd. 39°44′08″N 75°43′54″W | Mill Creek Hundred | Part of White Clay Creek State Park |
| 47 | Eastburn-Jeanes Lime Kilns Historic District | Eastburn-Jeanes Lime Kilns Historic District | April 28, 1977 (#77000389) | North of Newark on Limestone Rd. 39°44′30″N 75°43′00″W | Mill Creek Hundred | |
| 48 | Eastern Lock of the Chesapeake and Delaware Canal | Eastern Lock of the Chesapeake and Delaware Canal | April 21, 1975 (#75000543) | Battery Park; 39°34′44″N 75°35′14″W | Delaware City | |
| 49 | Eleutherian Mills | Eleutherian Mills | November 13, 1966 (#66000259) | North of Wilmington on Delaware Route 141 at Brandywine Creek Bridge; 39°46′50″N 75°34′30″W | Christiana Hundred | Includes most of the Hagley Museum and Library; some overlap with Breck's Mill Area |
| 50 | England House and Mill | England House and Mill | February 23, 1972 (#72001597) | 81 Red Mill Rd. 39°41′32″N 75°42′29″W | Mill Creek Hundred | |
| 51 | Fairview | Fairview | April 8, 1982 (#82002326) | 701 Cox Neck Rd. 39°33′49″N 75°36′50″W | Delaware City | Note that there are also Fairviews in Middletown and Odessa |
| 52 | Fell Historic District | Fell Historic District | June 16, 1983 (#83001335) | Faulkland Rd. and New Fell's Lane; 39°44′56″N 75°38′16″W | Mill Creek Hundred | |
| 53 | Robert Ferguson House | Robert Ferguson House | July 22, 1979 (#79000628) | 636 Chestnut Hill Rd. 39°40′24″N 75°42′24″W | White Clay Creek Hundred | Demolished |
| 54 | Fort Delaware on Pea Patch Island | Fort Delaware on Pea Patch Island | December 16, 1971 (#71000226) | Pea Patch Island in the Delaware River; 39°35′24″N 75°34′19″W | Delaware City | |
| 55 | Fort DuPont Historic District | Fort DuPont Historic District | October 28, 1999 (#99001275) | 248 Kent Ave. 39°34′17″N 75°35′06″W | Delaware City | Currently Fort DuPont State Park and the Governor Bacon Health Center |
| 56 | Galloway-Walker House | Galloway-Walker House | July 14, 1993 (#93000633) | 107 John St. 39°42′44″N 75°36′38″W | Newport | |
| 57 | Garrett Snuff Mill | Garrett Snuff Mill | May 22, 1978 (#78000913) | Delaware Route 82 and Yorklyn Rd. 39°48′31″N 75°40′26″W | Yorklyn | |
| 58 | Garrett Snuff Mills Historic District | Garrett Snuff Mills Historic District | January 24, 1980 (#80004486) | Delaware Route 82 and Yorklyn Rd. 39°48′38″N 75°40′21″W | Yorklyn | |
| 59 | Glebe House | Glebe House | April 3, 1973 (#73000521) | 350 Glebe Ln. 39°40′07″N 75°33′31″W | New Castle | |
| 60 | Glynrich | Glynrich | November 1, 1979 (#79000633) | Mill Rd. and Race St. 39°43′56″N 75°34′56″W | Christiana Hundred | |
| 61 | Robert Graham House | Robert Graham House | August 1, 1997 (#97000835) | 751 Crossan Rd. 39°45′23″N 75°43′57″W | Mill Creek Hundred | |
| 62 | Grantham-Edwards-McComb House | Grantham-Edwards-McComb House | January 19, 2016 (#15000977) | 217 Park Ave. 39°38′53″N 75°36′52″W | New Castle | |
| 63 | Graves Mill Historic District | Graves Mill Historic District | December 19, 1979 (#79000640) | East of Ashland on Way Rd. 39°48′17″N 75°38′40″W | Ashland | |
| 64 | Greenbank Historic Area | Greenbank Historic Area | July 2, 1973 (#73000513) | 500 Greenbank Mill Rd.; also 2300 Newport Gap Pike; 39°44′24″N 75°37′59″W | Marshallton | "Marshallton" represents a boundary increase of July 24, 1979 |
| 65 | Hale-Byrnes House | Hale-Byrnes House | June 2, 1972 (#72000290) | 606 Stanton-Christiana Road; 39°42′05″N 75°39′02″W | Stanton | |
| 66 | Head of Christiana United Presbyterian Church | Head of Christiana United Presbyterian Church | August 19, 1983 (#83001343) | 1100 Church Rd. 39°41′31″N 75°47′12″W | White Clay Creek Hundred | |
| 67 | The Hermitage | The Hermitage | March 1, 1973 (#73000522) | 901 Delaware St. 39°39′55″N 75°34′09″W | New Castle | Demolished in 2009 |
| 68 | Hersey-Duncan House | Hersey-Duncan House | November 15, 1990 (#90001714) | 2116 Duncan Rd. 39°44′06″N 75°38′27″W | Mill Creek Hundred | |
| 69 | William Hicklen House | William Hicklen House | October 6, 1983 (#83003519) | 502 Beaver Valley Rd. 39°49′55″N 75°33′22″W | Talleyville | Owned by the Woodlawn Trustees. |
| 70 | Hickman Blacksmith Shop and House | Hickman Blacksmith Shop and House | September 2, 1994 (#94001078) | 1201 and 1203 Greenbank Rd. 39°43′44″N 75°38′18″W | Marshallton | |
| 71 | Hickman Row | Hickman Row | June 16, 2006 (#06000284) | 1–117 Hickman Rd. 39°48′57″N 75°26′42″W | Claymont | |
| 72 | Hockessin Friends Meetinghouse | Hockessin Friends Meetinghouse | March 20, 1973 (#73000510) | 1501 Old Wilmington Rd. 39°47′34″N 75°41′28″W | Hockessin | |
| 73 | Holladay-Harrington House | Holladay-Harrington House | September 30, 2004 (#04001077) | 3705 Kennett Pike; 39°46′28″N 75°35′34″W | Greenville | Patterson Schwartz Realty |
| 74 | Holly Oak | Holly Oak | April 10, 2017 (#100000843) | 1503 Ridge Rd. 39°46′58″N 75°28′39″W | Claymont | |
| 75 | House at 901 Mt. Lebanon Rd. | House at 901 Mt. Lebanon Rd. | March 28, 2017 (#100000656) | 901 Mt. Lebanon Rd. 39°47′53″N 75°34′11″W | Rockland | |
| 76 | Independence Mall | Independence Mall | June 3, 2025 (#100011906) | 1601 Concord Pike; 39°37′54″N 75°45′29″W | Wilmington vicinity (Brandywine Hundred) | |
| 77 | Iron Hill School No. 112C | Iron Hill School No. 112C | August 18, 1995 (#95001032) | 1335 Old Baltimore Pike; 39°37′54″N 75°45′29″W | Pencader Hundred | Iron Hill Museum |
| 78 | Ivyside Farm | Ivyside Farm | January 4, 1982 (#82002324) | 1301 Naaman's Rd. 39°49′17″N 75°28′37″W | Claymont | |
| 79 | Johnson-Morris House | Johnson-Morris House | February 22, 2011 (#11000036) | 41 Upper Pike Creek Rd. 39°42′19″N 75°41′47″W | Mill Creek Hundred | |
| 80 | William Julius "Judy" Johnson House | William Julius "Judy" Johnson House | October 10, 1995 (#95001145) | 3701 Kiamensi Ave. in Christiana Hundred; 39°43′48″N 75°38′00″W | Marshallton | |
| 81 | Thomas Justis House | Thomas Justis House | September 23, 1993 (#93000989) | 1001 Milltown Rd. 39°44′03″N 75°39′31″W | Mill Creek Hundred | |
| 82 | Justis-Jones House | Justis-Jones House | August 28, 1998 (#98001096) | 2606 Newport Gap Pike; 39°44′36″N 75°38′25″W | Mill Creek Hundred | |
| 83 | Killgore Hall | Killgore Hall | July 14, 1993 (#93000630) | 101 N. James St. 39°42′53″N 75°36′36″W | Newport | Demolished c. 2000 |
| 84 | Joseph Killgore House | Joseph Killgore House | July 14, 1993 (#93000627) | 107 N. James St. 39°42′54″N 75°36′36″W | Newport | Demolished c. 2000 |
| 85 | La Grange | La Grange | July 10, 1974 (#74000601) | 2467 Pulaski Highway; 39°36′22″N 75°44′54″W | Glasgow | |
| 86 | Laurel | Laurel | December 4, 1974 (#74000603) | 619 Shipley Rd. 39°46′25″N 75°31′00″W | Brandywine Hundred | |
| 87 | Lesley-Travers Mansion | Lesley-Travers Mansion | April 3, 1973 (#73000523) | 112 W. 6th St. 39°39′39″N 75°34′11″W | New Castle | |
| 88 | John Lewden House | John Lewden House | September 24, 1979 (#79003104) | 107 E. Main St. 39°39′48″N 75°39′20″W | Christiana | |
| 89 | Linden Hill | Linden Hill | April 8, 1982 (#82002356) | 34 N. DuPont Highway; 39°33′48″N 75°39′20″W | St. Georges | |
| 90 | J. Lindsay Barn | J. Lindsay Barn | November 13, 1986 (#86003089) | 15 Middleton Dr. 39°45′04″N 75°41′16″W | Mill Creek Hundred | Offices of Covenant Wealth Strategies. |
| 91 | Samuel Lindsey House | Samuel Lindsey House | August 19, 1983 (#83001397) | 693 New London Rd. 39°42′27″N 75°46′36″W | McClellandville | |
| 92 | Lobdell Estate, Minquadale Home | Lobdell Estate, Minquadale Home | June 4, 1973 (#73000548) | N. DuPont Highway; 39°42′23″N 75°34′13″W | New Castle Hundred | Demolished between 1984 and 2002. |
| 93 | Lombardy Hall | Lombardy Hall | December 5, 1972 (#72000292) | 1611 Concord Pike; 39°46′53″N 75°32′40″W | Brandywine Hundred | |
| 94 | Louviers | Louviers | December 13, 1971 (#71000231) | 10 Black Gates Rd. 39°47′08″N 75°34′20″W | Brandywine Hundred | House demolished; gatehouses remain. |
| 95 | Lower Louviers and Chicken Alley | Lower Louviers and Chicken Alley | February 1, 1972 (#72000293) | 1 Black Gates Rd. 39°47′06″N 75°34′26″W | Brandywine Hundred | |
| 96 | Lum's Mill House | Lum's Mill House | May 22, 1973 (#73000511) | Off Red Lion Road in Lums Pond State Park; 39°33′03″N 75°42′47″W | Kirkwood | Part of Lums Pond State Park |
| 97 | Marcus Hook Range Rear Light | Marcus Hook Range Rear Light | March 27, 1989 (#89000287) | 313 Light House Rd. 39°45′44″N 75°30′13″W | Brandywine Hundred | |
| 98 | Marshallton United Methodist Church | Marshallton United Methodist Church | February 18, 1987 (#86002945) | 1105 Stanton Rd. 39°43′36″N 75°38′19″W | Marshallton | |
| 99 | J. Mason Farm | J. Mason Farm | November 13, 1986 (#86003091) | 2272 Creek Road; 39°47′53″N 75°39′04″W | Ashland | Part of Ashland Farm (Henry B. du Pont IV estate) |
| 100 | J. McCormack Farm | J. McCormack Farm | November 13, 1986 (#86003093) | Newport Gap Turnpike north of Mill Creek Rd. 39°45′17″N 75°39′24″W | Mill Creek Hundred | Demolished between 1992 and 2002. |
| 101 | McCoy House | McCoy House | April 24, 1973 (#73000512) | 4185 Kirkwood St. Georges Rd. 39°33′36″N 75°40′37″W | Kirkwood | Part of an AdvoServ campus |
| 102 | J. McDaniel Farm | J. McDaniel Farm | November 13, 1986 (#86003094) | 112 Cardiff Court W 39°44′57″N 75°42′59″W | Mill Creek Hundred | |
| 103 | J. McIntyre Farm | J. McIntyre Farm | November 13, 1986 (#86003098) | 6464 Limestone Rd. 39°46′35″N 75°43′21″W | Mill Creek Hundred | Owned by the Robert N. Downs Memorial Conservancy |
| 104 | Meeteer House | Meeteer House | September 2, 1993 (#93000888) | 801 Kirkwood Highway; 39°41′45″N 75°43′07″W | Mill Creek Hundred | |
| 105 | Merestone | Merestone | March 2, 1995 (#95000093) | 1610–1620 Yeatman's Mill Rd. 39°45′46″N 75°44′56″W | Mill Creek Hundred | Extends into Chester County, Pennsylvania |
| 106 | Mermaid Tavern | Mermaid Tavern | December 18, 1973 (#73000529) | 4900 Limestone Rd. 39°44′34″N 75°41′40″W | Mill Creek Hundred | |
| 107 | Mill Creek Friends Meetinghouse | Mill Creek Friends Meetinghouse | April 3, 1973 (#73000530) | 1140 Doe Run Rd. 39°45′52″N 75°44′30″W | Mill Creek Hundred | |
| 108 | Montchanin Historic District | Montchanin Historic District | June 9, 1978 (#78000900) | Delaware Route 100; 39°47′21″N 75°35′18″W | Montchanin | |
| 109 | Montgomery House | Montgomery House | July 28, 1988 (#88001160) | 2900 Old Limestone Rd. 39°43′53″N 75°40′15″W | Wilmington | |
| 110 | William Morgan Farm | William Morgan Farm | November 13, 1986 (#86003099) | 821–824 Doe Run Rd. 39°45′07″N 75°44′25″W | Mill Creek Hundred | |
| 111 | James Morrow House | James Morrow House | August 19, 1983 (#83001399) | 1130 (Formerly 1210) Ogletown Rd. 39°41′08″N 75°43′25″W | White Clay Creek Hundred | |
| 112 | Mount Cuba | Mount Cuba | April 2, 2003 (#03000172) | 3120 Barley Mill Rd. 39°47′18″N 75°38′54″W | Mount Cuba | Headquarters of Mt. Cuba Center botanical garden |
| 113 | Mount Cuba Historic District | Mount Cuba Historic District | December 19, 1979 (#79000627) | Delaware Route 82 and Road 261; 39°47′22″N 75°38′26″W | Mount Cuba | |
| 114 | Mount Lebanon Methodist Episcopal Church | Mount Lebanon Methodist Episcopal Church | May 3, 1984 (#84000845) | 850 Mount Lebanon Rd. 39°47′55″N 75°34′04″W | Wilmington | |
| 115 | Mount Pleasant Methodist Episcopal Church and Parsonage | Mount Pleasant Methodist Episcopal Church and Parsonage | August 28, 1998 (#98001097) | 1009 Philadelphia Pike; 39°46′37″N 75°29′27″W | Wilmington | Part of Bellevue State Park |
| 116 | Mt. Airy School No. 27 | Mt. Airy School No. 27 | April 13, 1983 (#83001400) | 2 Selborne Dr. 39°49′37″N 75°37′10″W | Centreville | |
| 117 | Naaman's Creek School | Naaman's Creek School | November 15, 1990 (#90001715) | 3611 Philadelphia Pike; 39°48′17″N 75°27′17″W | Claymont | |
| 118 | New Castle and Frenchtown Railroad Right-of-Way | New Castle and Frenchtown Railroad Right-of-Way | September 1, 1976 (#76002290) | Off U.S. Route 40 between Frenchtown, Maryland and Porter; 39°35′37″N 75°45′54″W | Porter | Extends into Cecil County, Maryland |
| 119 | New Castle County Court House | New Castle County Court House | November 28, 1972 (#72000285) | 211 Delaware St. 39°39′35″N 75°33′49″W | New Castle | Part of the First State National Historical Park |
| 120 | New Castle Historic District | New Castle Historic District | December 24, 1967 (#67000003) | Bounded by Harmony St., The Strand, 3rd St., and Delaware St.; also roughly bounded by the Delaware River, Broad Dike, and 4th, 6th, 7th, and Penn Sts. 39°39′39″N 75°33′50″W | New Castle | Second set of boundaries represents a boundary increase of November 8, 1984 |
| 121 | New Castle Ice Piers | New Castle Ice Piers | February 4, 1982 (#82002333) | Delaware River; 39°39′28″N 75°33′39″W | New Castle | |
| 122 | Newark Union Church and Cemetery | Newark Union Church and Cemetery | February 6, 2020 (#100004955) | 8 and 20 Newark Union Public Rd. 39°47′10″N 75°30′48″W | Brandywine Hundred | |
| 123 | Newport National Bank | Newport National Bank | July 14, 1993 (#93000634) | 100 E. Market St. 39°42′49″N 75°36′29″W | Newport | |
| 124 | Newport Railroad Station | Newport Railroad Station | January 21, 1994 (#93001515) | 112 S. James St. 39°42′44″N 75°36′32″W | Newport | Demolished between 1995 and 2002. |
| 125 | North Saint Georges Historic District | North Saint Georges Historic District | August 22, 1995 (#95001033) | Roughly along Main, Broad, Delaware, and Church Sts. in Red Lion Hundred; 39°33′24″N 75°39′07″W | St. Georges | |
| 126 | Old Cann Mansion House | Old Cann Mansion House | April 8, 1982 (#82002329) | 2290 Red Lion Road; 39°34′26″N 75°41′33″W | Kirkwood | |
| 127 | Old Fort Church | Old Fort Church | August 19, 1983 (#83001402) | 37 N. Old Baltimore Pike; 39°40′04″N 75°39′33″W | Christiana | |
| 128 | Old Post Office | Old Post Office | April 8, 1982 (#82002330) | 3616 Kirkwood St. Georges Rd. 39°34′16″N 75°41′47″W | Kirkwood | |
| 129 | Ott's Chapel | Ott's Chapel | August 13, 1986 (#86001555) | 1655 Otts Chapel Road; 39°38′03″N 75°46′43″W | Pencader Hundred | |
| 130 | Owl's Nest Country Place | Owl's Nest Country Place | August 30, 2010 (#10000597) | 201 Owl's Nest Rd; 39°48′55″N 75°37′25″W | Centreville | |
| 131 | Parker's Dairy Palace | Parker's Dairy Palace | October 15, 2019 (#100004513) | 2 Jay Dr. 39°41′11″N 75°35′40″W | New Castle | |
| 132 | Penn Farm of the Trustees of the New Castle Common | Penn Farm of the Trustees of the New Castle Common | September 11, 1997 (#97001120) | 807 Frenchtown Road; 39°40′01″N 75°35′33″W | New Castle | |
| 133 | T. Pierson Farm | T. Pierson Farm | November 13, 1986 (#86003101) | 669 Southwood Rd. 39°47′16″N 75°42′56″W | Hockessin | |
| 134 | Point Farm | Point Farm | April 8, 1982 (#82002331) | 2950 Red Lion Road; 39°33′18″N 75°42′09″W | Kirkwood | |
| 135 | Public School No. 111-C | Public School No. 111-C | October 18, 1979 (#79000625) | 50 N. Old Baltimore Pike; 39°40′07″N 75°39′31″W | Christiana | |
| 136 | Public School No. 29 | Public School No. 29 | May 22, 1978 (#78000894) | 1041 Valley Rd. 39°47′21″N 75°42′02″W | Hockessin | |
| 137 | Joshua Pyle House and Wagon Barn | Joshua Pyle House and Wagon Barn | September 13, 1993 (#93000887) | 2603 Foulk Rd. 39°49′45″N 75°30′01″W | Brandywine Hundred | |
| 138 | George Read II House | George Read II House | December 23, 2016 (#100000872) | 42 The Strand; 39°39′35″N 75°33′41″W | New Castle | |
| 139 | Red Clay Creek Presbyterian Church | Red Clay Creek Presbyterian Church | April 11, 1973 (#73000532) | 500 McKennans Church Rd. 39°45′09″N 75°39′33″W | Newport | |
| 140 | Robinson House | Robinson House | June 21, 1971 (#71000225) | 1 Naamans Road; 39°48′37″N 75°26′31″W | Claymont | State of Delaware |
| 141 | Rockland Historic District | Rockland Historic District | February 1, 1972 (#72000289) | Town of Rockland and its environs along Rockland Rd. and Brandywine Creek; 39°47′48″N 75°34′28″W | Rockland | |
| 142 | Rockwood | Rockwood | July 12, 1976 (#76000579) | 610 Shipley Rd. 39°46′21″N 75°31′15″W | Wilmington | New Castle County park; boundary decrease approved April 19, 2023 |
| 143 | Rosemont | Rosemont | February 27, 2009 (#09000051) | 15½ Cragmere Rd. 39°46′12″N 75°29′30″W | Wilmington | |
| 144 | St. Georges Cemetery Caretaker's House | St. Georges Cemetery Caretaker's House | April 8, 1982 (#82002357) | 4320 Kirkwood St. Georges Rd. 39°33′37″N 75°40′10″W | St. Georges | |
| 145 | St. Georges Presbyterian Church | St. Georges Presbyterian Church | November 7, 1984 (#84000263) | 120–200 N. Main St. 39°33′21″N 75°39′07″W | St. Georges | St. Georges Historical Society |
| 146 | St. James Episcopal Church, Mill Creek | St. James Episcopal Church, Mill Creek | May 8, 1973 (#73000543) | 2106 St. James Church Rd. 39°43′07″N 75°39′38″W | Stanton | |
| 147 | St. Joseph's on the Brandywine | St. Joseph's on the Brandywine | November 7, 1976 (#76000572) | 10 Barley Mill Rd. 39°46′20″N 75°35′19″W | Greenville | |
| 148 | Charles Springer Tavern | Charles Springer Tavern | September 11, 1992 (#92001142) | 7 Stone Barn Ln. 39°45′42″N 75°37′13″W | Christiana Hundred | |
| 149 | Springer Farm | Springer Farm | November 13, 1986 (#86003103) | 6621 Limestone Rd. 39°47′09″N 75°43′28″W | Hockessin | |
| 150 | Springer-Cranston House | Springer-Cranston House | September 30, 1994 (#94001177) | 1015 Stanton Rd. in Mill Creek Hundred; 39°43′33″N 75°38′18″W | Marshallton | |
| 151 | Starl House | Starl House | April 8, 1982 (#82002358) | U.S. Route 13; 39°34′44″N 75°39′30″W | St. Georges | Demolished between 1982 and 1992. |
| 152 | James Steel House | James Steel House | August 19, 1983 (#83001341) | 1016 W. Church St. 39°41′28″N 75°47′09″W | White Clay Creek Hundred | |
| 153 | James Stewart House | James Stewart House | June 11, 1986 (#86001314) | 2611 Del Laws Rd. 39°36′02″N 75°42′56″W | Glasgow | |
| 154 | James Stewart Jr. House | James Stewart Jr. House | August 19, 1983 (#83001340) | 563 Walther Rd. 39°38′26″N 75°41′00″W | Christiana | |
| 155 | Stockton-Montmorency | Stockton-Montmorency | April 3, 2012 (#12000165) | 1700 Walnut Green Rd. 39°47′30″N 75°37′50″W | Greenville | |
| 156 | Stonum | Stonum | November 7, 1973 (#73000524) | 900 Washington Ave. 39°39′37″N 75°34′35″W | New Castle | |
| 157 | Strand Millas and Rock Spring | Strand Millas and Rock Spring | July 16, 1973 (#73000520) | 204 & 411 Rockland Rd. 39°47′32″N 75°35′02″W | Montchanin | |
| 158 | Sutton House | Sutton House | April 24, 1973 (#73000542) | 10 Delaware St. 39°33′21″N 75°39′00″W | St. Georges | |
| 159 | Swanwyck | Swanwyck | March 17, 1977 (#77000387) | 65 Landers Lane; 39°41′31″N 75°33′50″W | New Castle | |
| 160 | William Talley House | William Talley House | February 21, 1985 (#85000310) | 1813 Foulk Rd. 39°48′35″N 75°30′55″W | Wilmington address | |
| 161 | Joseph Tatnall House | Joseph Tatnall House | July 14, 1993 (#93000631) | 205 S. James St. 39°42′39″N 75°36′34″W | Newport | Now part of a BASF complex |
| 162 | Vernacular Frame House | Vernacular Frame House | April 8, 1982 (#82002359) | 105 Clarks Corner Rd. 39°33′24″N 75°38′53″W | St. Georges | |
| 163 | Village of Arden | Village of Arden | February 6, 1973 (#73000550) | 6 miles north of Wilmington between Marsh Rd., Naaman's Creek, and Ardentown; 39°48′40″N 75°29′14″W | Arden | |
| 164 | Walker's Mill and Walker's Bank | Walker's Mill and Walker's Bank | February 1, 1972 (#72000296) | Walkers Mill Rd. 39°46′14″N 75°34′43″W | Wilmington | |
| 165 | Walnut Green School | Walnut Green School | August 19, 1994 (#94001014) | Junction of Delaware Route 82 and Owl's Nest Rd. 39°47′37″N 75°37′31″W | Greenville | |
| 166 | Walnut Lane | Walnut Lane | July 22, 1979 (#79000629) | East of Newark at 4133 Stanton-Ogletown Rd. 39°41′02″N 75°41′03″W | White Clay Creek Hundred | Demolished between 1979 and 1992. |
| 167 | Lewis Weldin House | Lewis Weldin House | July 14, 1993 (#93000632) | 7-9 W. Market St. 39°42′50″N 75°36′36″W | Newport | Demolished between 2007 and 2009 |
| 168 | Welsh Tract Baptist Church | Welsh Tract Baptist Church | March 1, 1973 (#73000527) | Welsh Tract Rd. 39°39′01″N 75°45′07″W | Pencader Hundred | |
| 169 | Wesley M.E. Church | Wesley M.E. Church | August 19, 1983 (#83001407) | 839 New London Rd. 39°42′42″N 75°46′44″W | McClellandville | |
| 170 | White Hall | White Hall | July 12, 1990 (#90001072) | 130 Michael Ln. 39°34′24″N 75°43′17″W | Bear | |
| 171 | Wilmington and Western Railroad | Wilmington and Western Railroad | September 8, 1980 (#80000932) | 2201 Newport Gap Pike; 39°44′19″N 75°37′58″W | Greenbank | |
| 172 | Henry Francis du Pont Winterthur Museum and Gardens | Henry Francis du Pont Winterthur Museum and Gardens | February 24, 1971 (#71000233) | 6 miles northwest of Wilmington on Delaware Route 52; 39°48′31″N 75°36′01″W | Winterthur | |
| 173 | Woman's Club of Newport | Woman's Club of Newport | July 14, 1993 (#93000629) | 15 N. Augustine St. 39°42′53″N 75°36′22″W | Newport | |
| 174 | Wooddale Bridge | Wooddale Bridge | April 11, 1973 (#73000552) | Foxhill Ln. over Red Clay Creek; 39°45′57″N 75°38′13″W | Wooddale | |
| 175 | Wooddale Historic District | Wooddale Historic District | August 24, 1979 (#79000630) | Northwest of Newport on Wooddale Rd; 39°46′01″N 75°38′18″W | Wooddale | |
| 176 | Woodstock | Woodstock | September 7, 1973 (#73000551) | 102 Middleboro Rd. 39°43′19″N 75°35′24″W | Wilmington | New Castle County park |
| 177 | William Young House | William Young House | October 29, 1982 (#82001029) | 507 Black Gates Road; 39°47′40″N 75°33′54″W | Rockland | |

== See also ==
- National Register of Historic Places listings in Delaware
- List of National Historic Landmarks in Delaware
