= Stockton-Montmorency =

Historic house in Delaware, US

- U.S. National Register of Historic Places
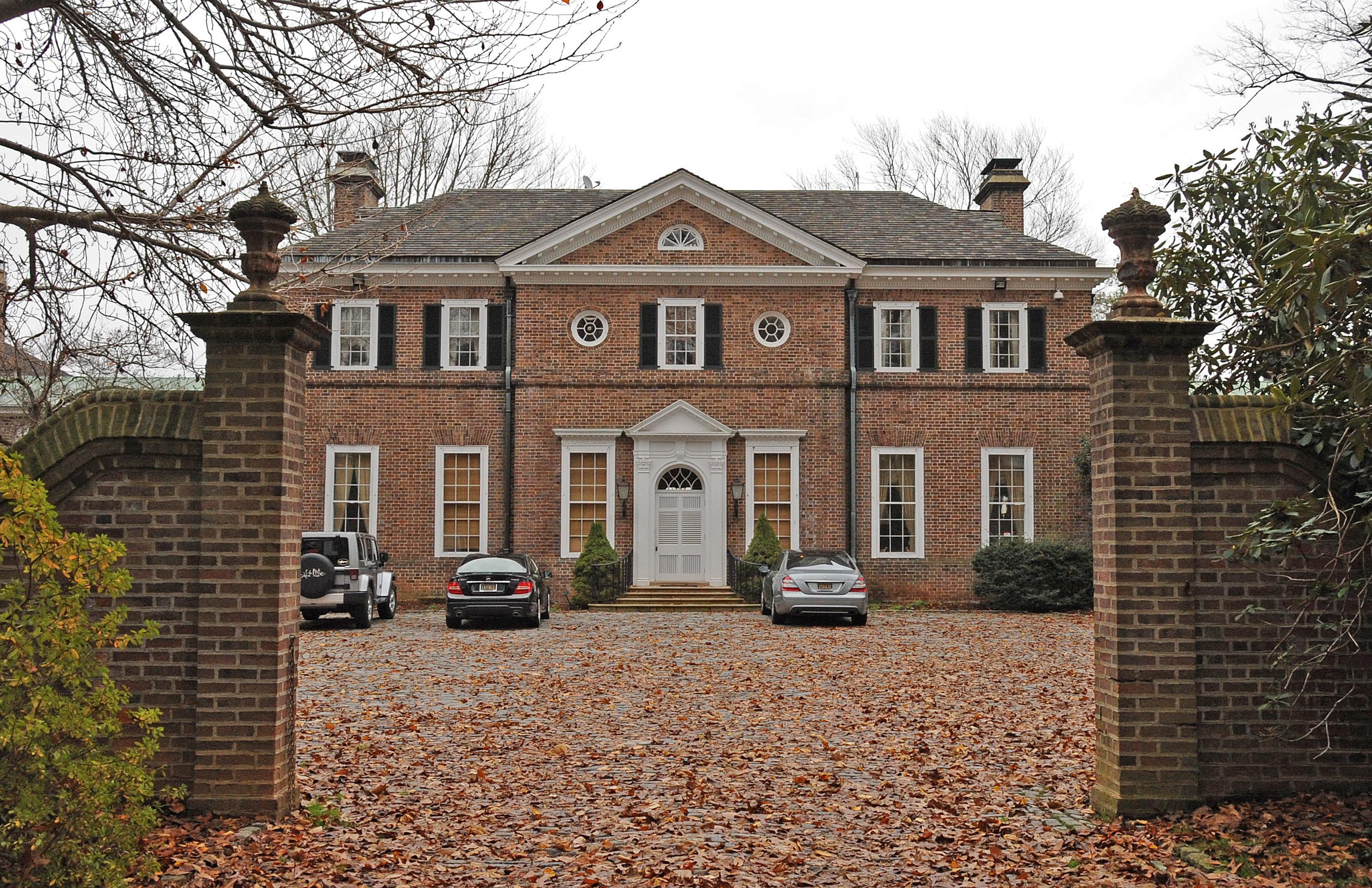

- Location within Delaware Location within the United States
- Location: 1700 Walnut Green Road, Greenville, Delaware
- Coordinates: 39.79175°N 75.63043°W
- Built: c. 1937
- Architectural style: Colonial Revival
- NRHP reference No.: 12000165
- Added to NRHP: April 3, 2012

Stockton-Montmorency is a historic house at 1700 Walnut Green Road in Greenville, Delaware, United States. This elegant brick Colonial Revival house, originally just called "Stockton", was designed by William Lawrence Bottomley and built in 1937 for Helen Page Echols and Angus Echols. The house was purchased in the 1960s by Henry E. I. du Pont, who added "Montmorency" to its name.

The house was listed on the National Register of Historic Places in 2012.

== See also ==
- National Register of Historic Places listings in northern New Castle County, Delaware
