= Grantham-Edwards-McComb House =

Historic house in Delaware, United States

- U.S. National Register of Historic Places
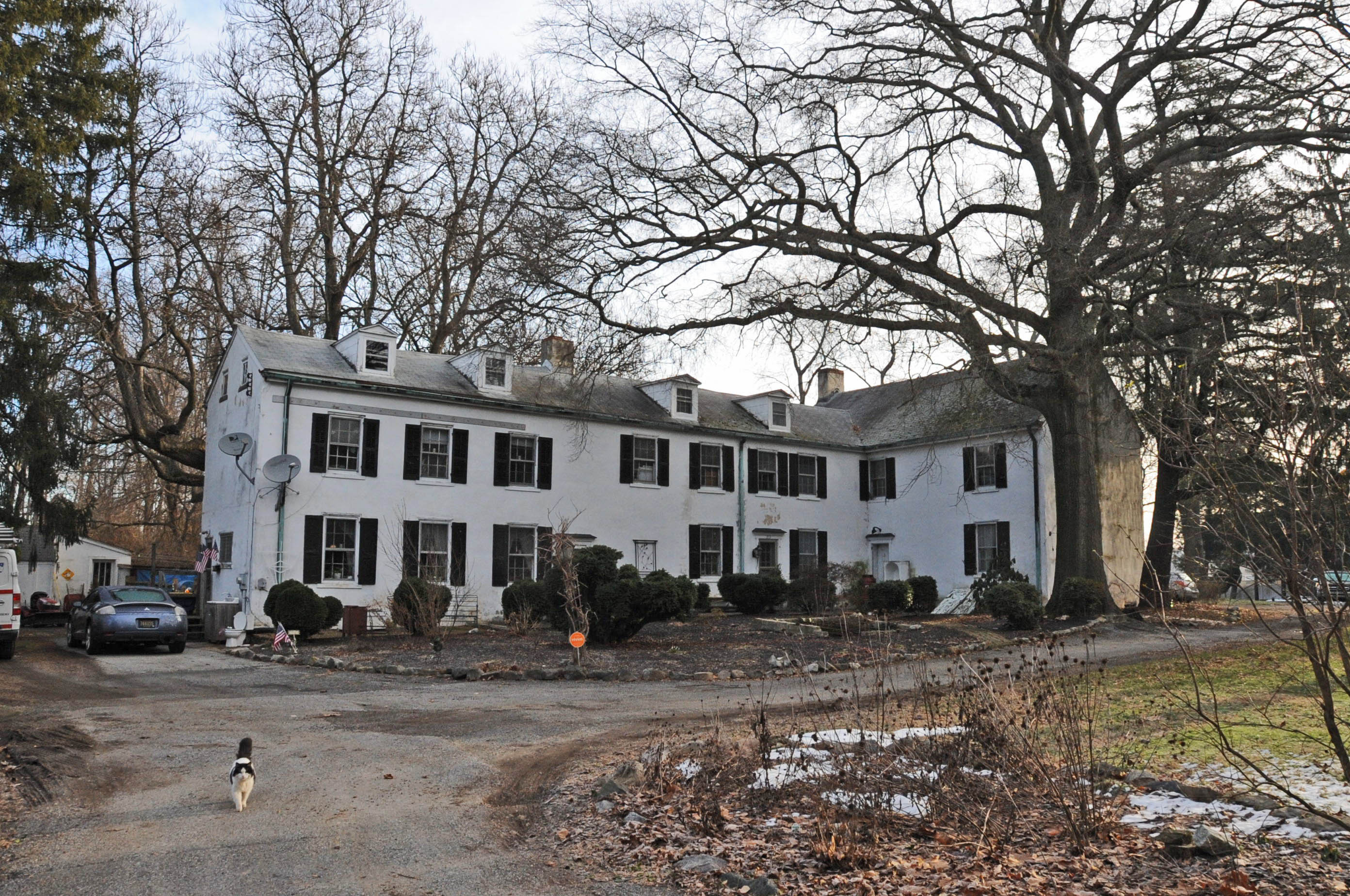

- Location within Delaware Location within the United States
- Location: 217 Park Ave., New Castle, Delaware
- Coordinates: 39°38′53″N 75°36′52″W
- Built: 1804
- Architect: Grantham, Isaac
- Architectural style: Federal
- NRHP reference No.: 15000977
- Added to NRHP: January 19, 2016

The Grantham-Edwards-McComb House is a historic house at 217 Park Avenue in New Castle, Delaware, United States. It is a 2 1/2-story Federal style brick building with a side gable roof, end chimneys, and a five bay facade. It was built between 1804 and 1817 by Isaac Grantham, and was probably used as a tenant farm in its early years. After the American Civil War it was acquired by Henry S. McComb, a Civil War veteran who later was a cofounder of the Union Pacific Railroad.

The house was added to the National Register of Historic Places in 2016.

== See also ==
- National Register of Historic Places listings in northern New Castle County, Delaware
