= Graves Mill Historic District =

Historic district in Delaware, United States

- U.S. National Register of Historic Places
- U.S. Historic district
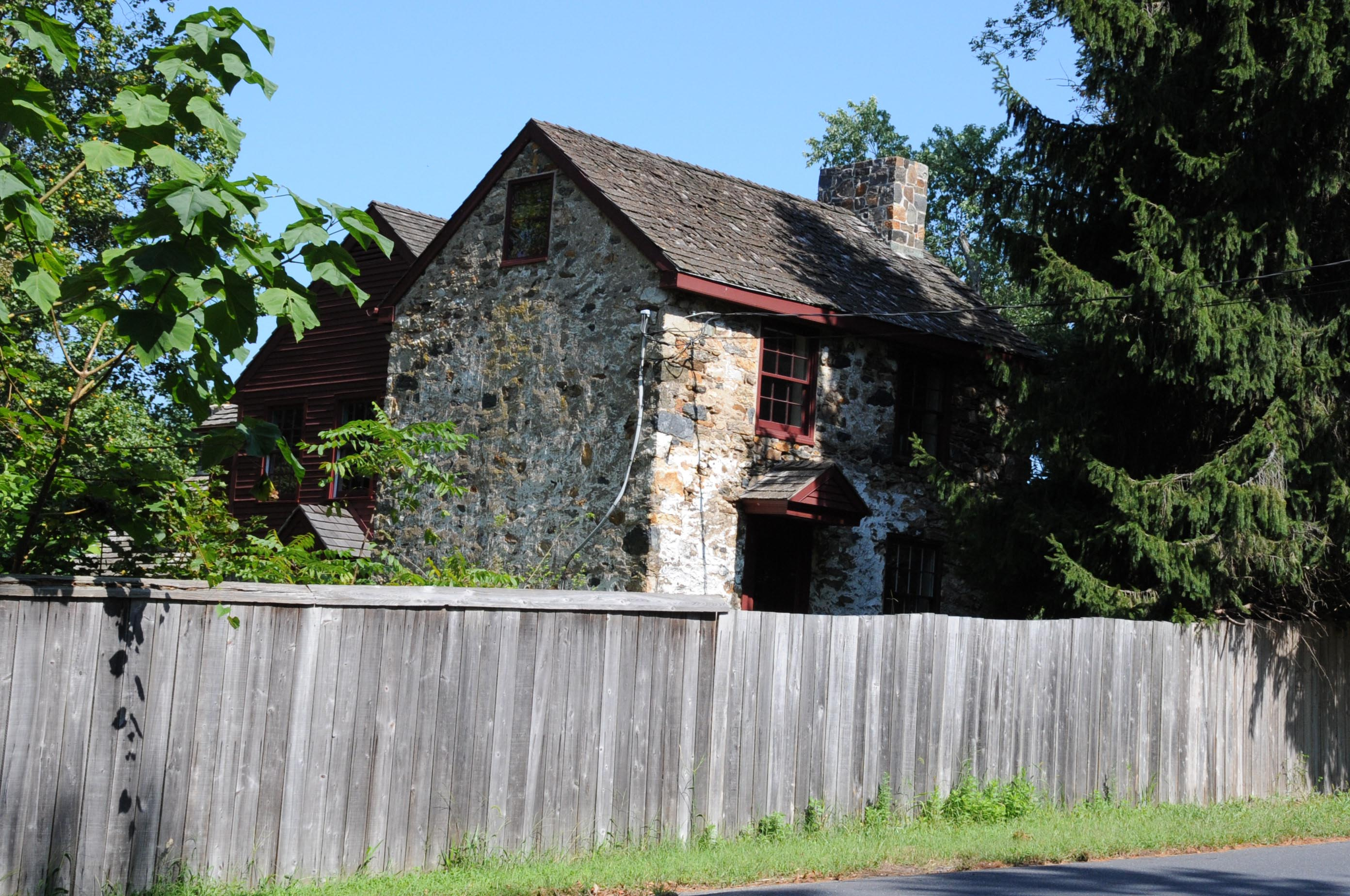
- One of the houses associated with William Armstrong

- Location within Delaware Location within the United States
- Location: East of Ashland on Way Rd., Ashland, Delaware
- Coordinates: 39°48′17″N 75°38′40″W
- Area: 51 acres (21 ha)
- Built: 1795
- NRHP reference No.: 79000640
- Added to NRHP: December 19, 1979

Graves Mill Historic District is a national historic district located near Ashland, Delaware, United States. It encompasses 7 contributing buildings and 2 contributing structures that are associated with Graves Mill. They include the Samuel Graves Mill, the Hayes Graves House and barn, the David Graves House and barn, and two houses associated with William Armstrong.

It was added to the National Register of Historic Places in 1979.
