= Chambers House (Hopkins Bridge Road, Newark, Delaware) =

Historic house in Delaware, United States

- U.S. National Register of Historic Places
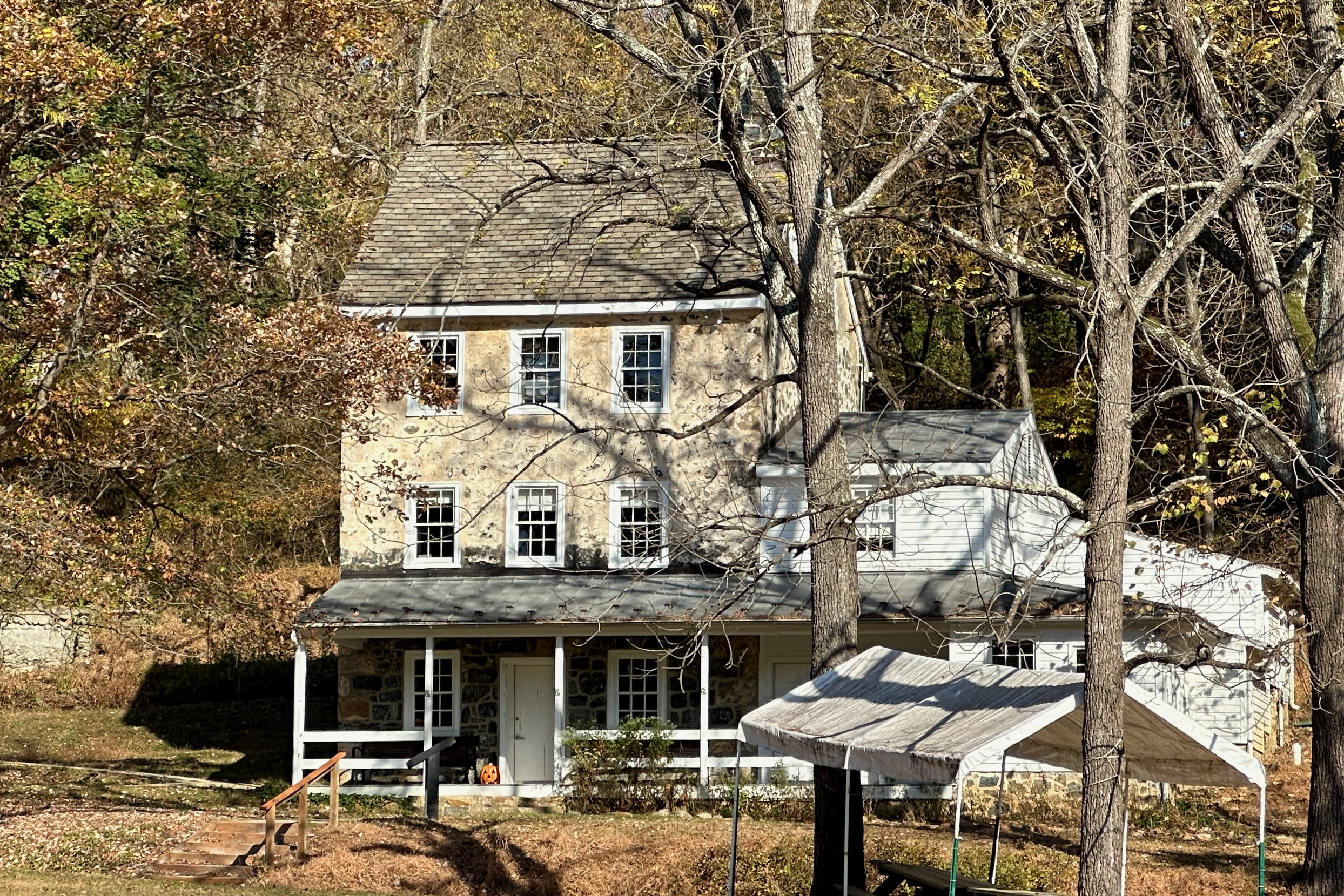
- The main entrance of the Chambers House, now a park nature center

- Location within Delaware Location within the United States
- Location: 1475 Creek Road, near Newark, Delaware
- Coordinates: 39.727233°N 75.768026°W
- Architectural style: Bank house
- NRHP reference No.: 88003132
- Added to NRHP: November 29, 1988

The Chambers House, also known as "Stairways," is a historic home located at 1475 Creek Road in New Castle County, Delaware, United States. It was built by Joseph Chambers between 1816 and 1852, and is a two- to three-story, Penn Plan bank house built of uncoursed fieldstone. It has a one and two story frame addition at the east of the house dated to the late 19th century.

The house was added to the National Register of Historic Places on November 29, 1988, for its significance in architecture. It is now used as the nature center for White Clay Creek State Park

== See also ==
- National Register of Historic Places listings in northern New Castle County, Delaware
