= Johnson-Morris House =

Historic house in Delaware, US

- U.S. National Register of Historic Places
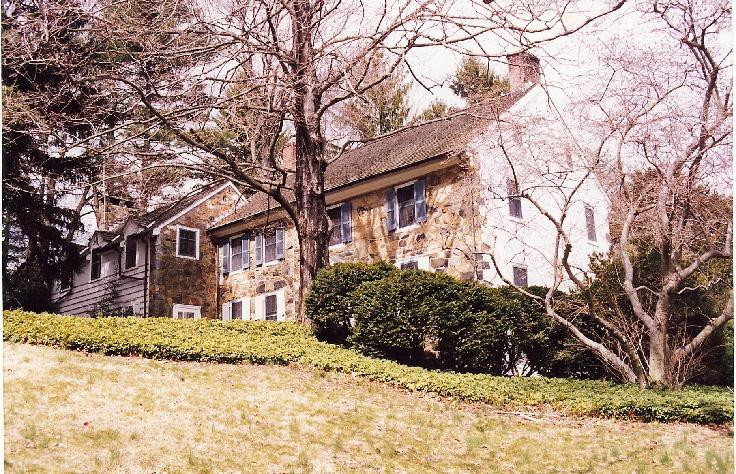

- Location within Delaware Location within the United States
- Location: 41 Upper Pike Creek Road, near Newark, Delaware
- Coordinates: 39°42′19″N 75°41′47″W
- Area: 7 acres (2.8 ha)
- Built: c. 1803
- Architectural style: Federal, Colonial Revival
- NRHP reference No.: 11000036
- Added to NRHP: February 22, 2011

The Johnson-Morris House is a historic house at 41 Upper Pike Creek Road in northern New Castle County, Delaware, United States. The core of the main house is a fieldstone farmhouse built c. 1803; it has four bays across and is two stories tall. A two-story ell, extending west from this main block, was added not long afterward. The house remained the central point of a farm until 1937, when it was purchased by Hugh M. Morris, a judge on the bench of the United States District Court for the District of Delaware. Between 1937 and 1939, the house underwent a major expansion, adding large ells, and restyling the original with Colonial Revival features. An earlier Colonial Revival transformation funded by Morris is now part of White Clay Creek State Park, part of which abuts this property.

The house was listed on the National Register of Historic Places in 2011.

== See also ==
- National Register of Historic Places listings in northern New Castle County, Delaware
