= Walnut Lane =

Former historic house in Delaware, US

- U.S. National Register of Historic Places
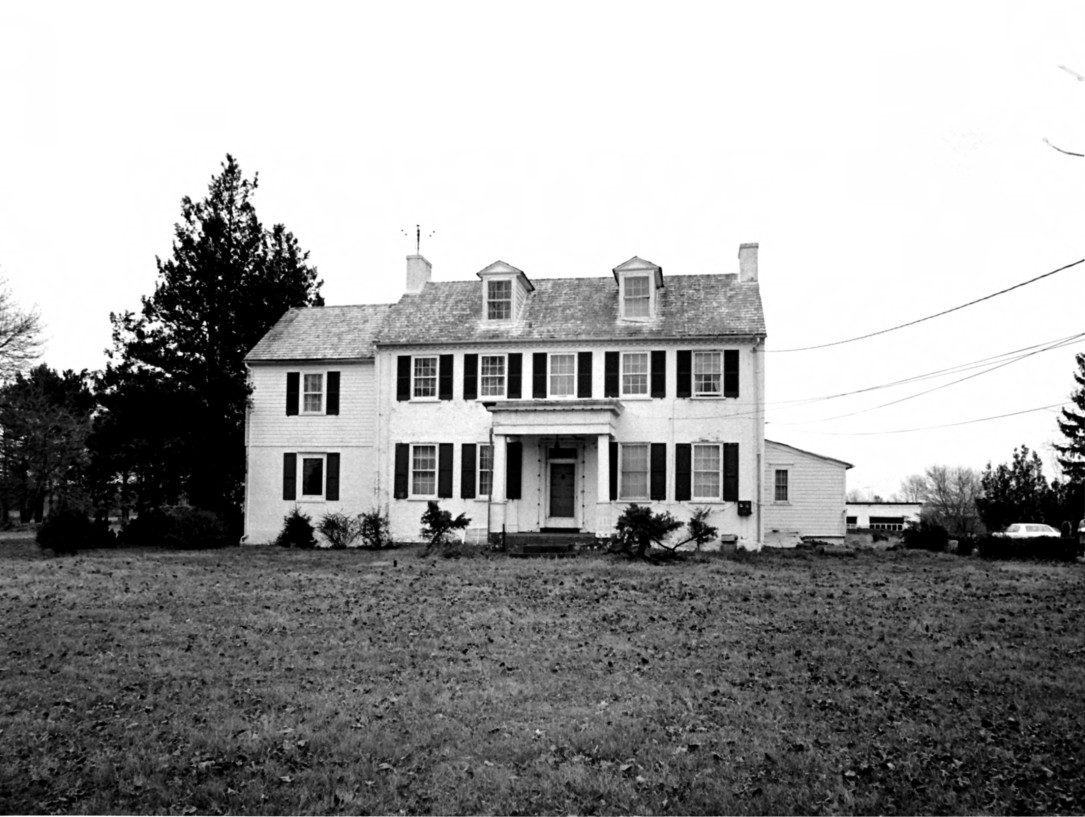
- The house in 1977

- Location within Delaware Location within the United States
- Location: East of Newark at 4133 Stanton-Ogletown Rd., near Newark, Delaware
- Coordinates: 39°41′2″N 75°41′3″W
- Area: 3.6 acres (1.5 ha)
- Built: 1835
- Architectural style: Greek Revival, Vernacular
- NRHP reference No.: 79000629
- Added to NRHP: July 22, 1979

Walnut Lane was a historic home located near Newark, New Castle County, Delaware. It was built about 1835, and is an L-shaped brick residence. The main house was a 2 1/2-story, five-bay, single-pile structure with a Greek Revival style front portico. It had a two-bay brick ell, with a 1 1/2 story frame addition.

It was added to the National Register of Historic Places in 1979. It was demolished before 1992.
