= Mermaid Tavern (Newark, Delaware) =

- U.S. National Register of Historic Places
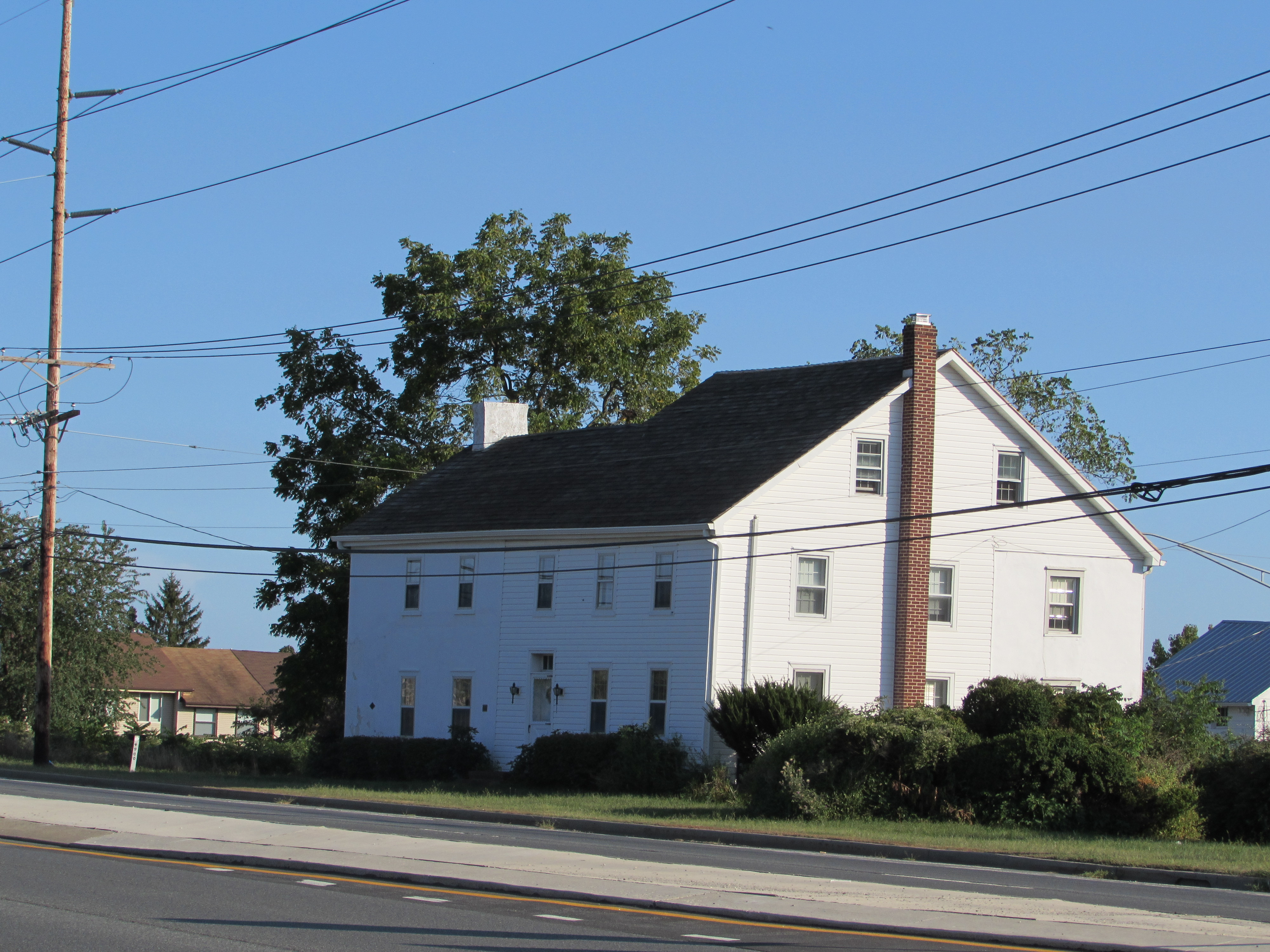
- The two bays towards the rear of the picture are the oldest part of the tavern, dating from 1725.

- Location within Delaware Location within the United States
- Location: 4900 Limestone Rd., northeast of Newark, Delaware
- Coordinates: 39.742801°N 75.694484°W
- Area: 5 acres (2.0 ha)
- Built: c. 1725, c. 1750
- NRHP reference No.: 73000529
- Added to NRHP: December 18, 1973

Mermaid Tavern is a historic home located at Newark, New Castle County, Delaware. The original section was built about 1725, and is a two-story, stuccoed stone structure with frame additions. The frame additions were built about 1750 and early 19th century. It has served not only as a tavern, but also as a polling place and as a post office.

It was added to the National Register of Historic Places in 1973.
