= J. McCormack Farm =

- U.S. National Register of Historic Places
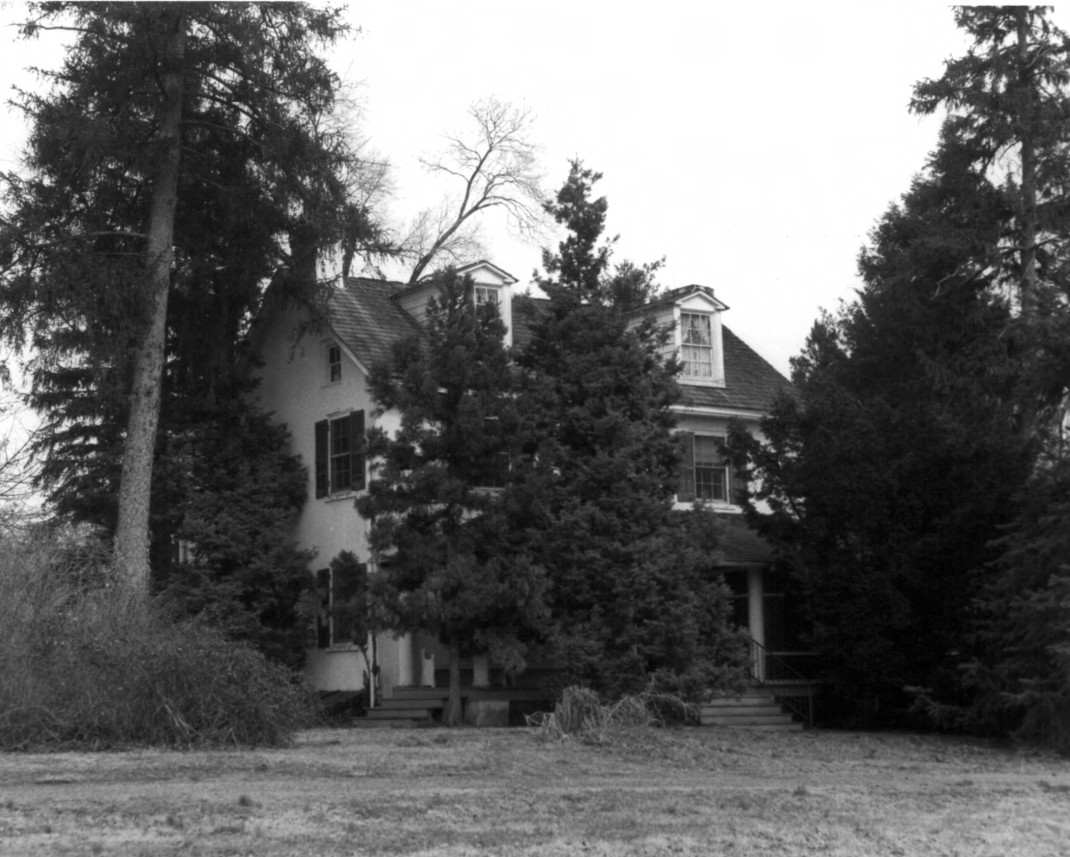

- Location within Delaware Location within the United States
- Location: Newport Gap Turnpike north of Mill Creek Rd., near Wilmington, Delaware
- Coordinates: 39°45′17″N 75°39′24″W
- Area: 25 acres (10 ha)
- Built: c. 1830
- Architectural style: Bi-level barn
- MPS: Agricultural Buildings and Complexes in Mill Creek Hundred, 1800-1840 TR
- NRHP reference No.: 86003093
- Added to NRHP: November 13, 1986

J. McCormack Farm was a historic farm near Wilmington, New Castle County, Delaware. The property included four contributing buildings. They were a stone house (c. 1830), a stone and frame bank barn (c. 1830), a storage building, and a corn crib. The house was a two-story, gable-roofed, stuccoed stone structure with a two-story rear wing. The barn walls were of semi-coursed fieldstone finished with a pebbled stucco.

It was added to the National Register of Historic Places in 1986 and demolished between 1992 and 2002. J. McCormack Farm has since been demolished.
