= Ivyside Farm =

Historic house in Delaware, US

- U.S. National Register of Historic Places
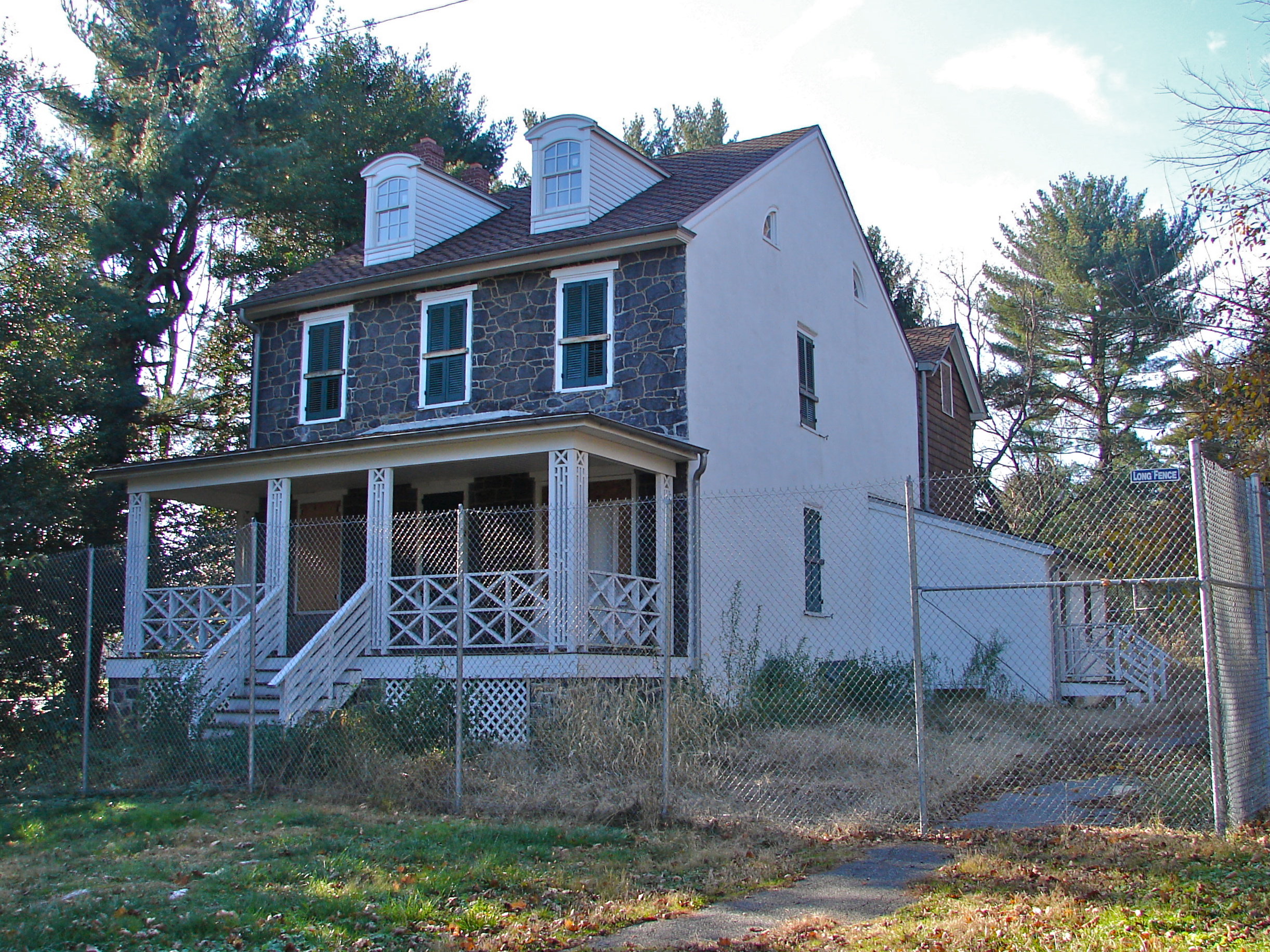
- Ivyside Farmhouse, November 2010

- Location within Delaware Location within the United States
- Location: 1301 Naamans Rd., Claymont, Delaware
- Coordinates: 39.821253°N 75.476864°W
- Area: 2.9 acres (1.2 ha)
- Built: c. 1795, 1853, 1907
- Architectural style: Greek Revival
- NRHP reference No.: 82002324
- Added to NRHP: January 4, 1982

Ivyside Farm is a historic home and farm located at Claymont, Delaware, United States. It was built in three sections with the earliest dated to about 1795. The earliest section is a 2 1/2-story, two-bay, single pile structure built of Brandywine granite. The second section was constructed in 1853, and is a two-story, three-bay, side-hall, double pile structure of Brandywine granite. It is in the Greek Revival style. In 1907, a two-story, gabled, shingle-sided section was added to the 1795 original structure and a two-story frame addition was built on the second section. Also on the property are a contributing large frame barn, wagon or carriage house, a corncrib and a chicken house.

It was listed on the National Register of Historic Places in 1982.
