= J. McDaniel Farm =

- U.S. National Register of Historic Places
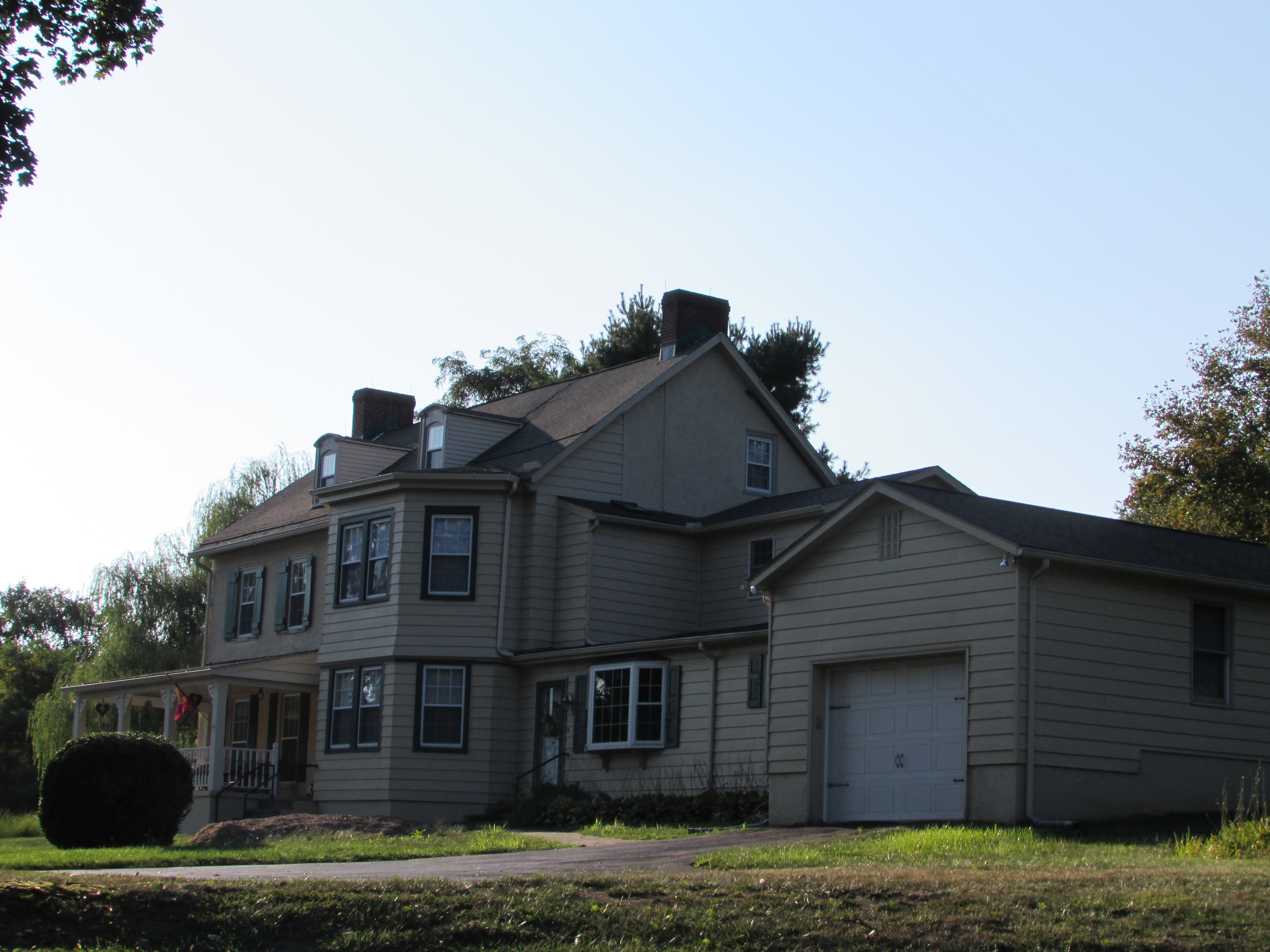
- The modified former farmhouse.

- Location within Delaware Location within the United States
- Location: 112 Cardiff Court W
- Coordinates: 39.749047°N 75.716361°W
- Area: 1.3 acres (0.53 ha)
- Built: 1826
- Architectural style: Tri-level barn
- MPS: Agricultural Buildings and Complexes in Mill Creek Hundred, 1800-1840 TR
- NRHP reference No.: 86003094
- Added to NRHP: November 13, 1986

J. McDaniel Farm is a historic farm located near Newark, New Castle County, Delaware. The property included three contributing buildings. They are a stone house (1826), a stone and frame tri-level barn (c. 1826), and a braced frame outbuilding, used as a garage. The house is a two-story, five-bay, gable-roofed, stuccoed stone structure. The barn has a frame upper level and a stone lower level.

It was added to the National Register of Historic Places in 1986. The barn has since been torn down, but the house and garage remain intact.
