= Bartley–Tweed Farm =

Historic farm in Delaware, US

- U.S. National Register of Historic Places
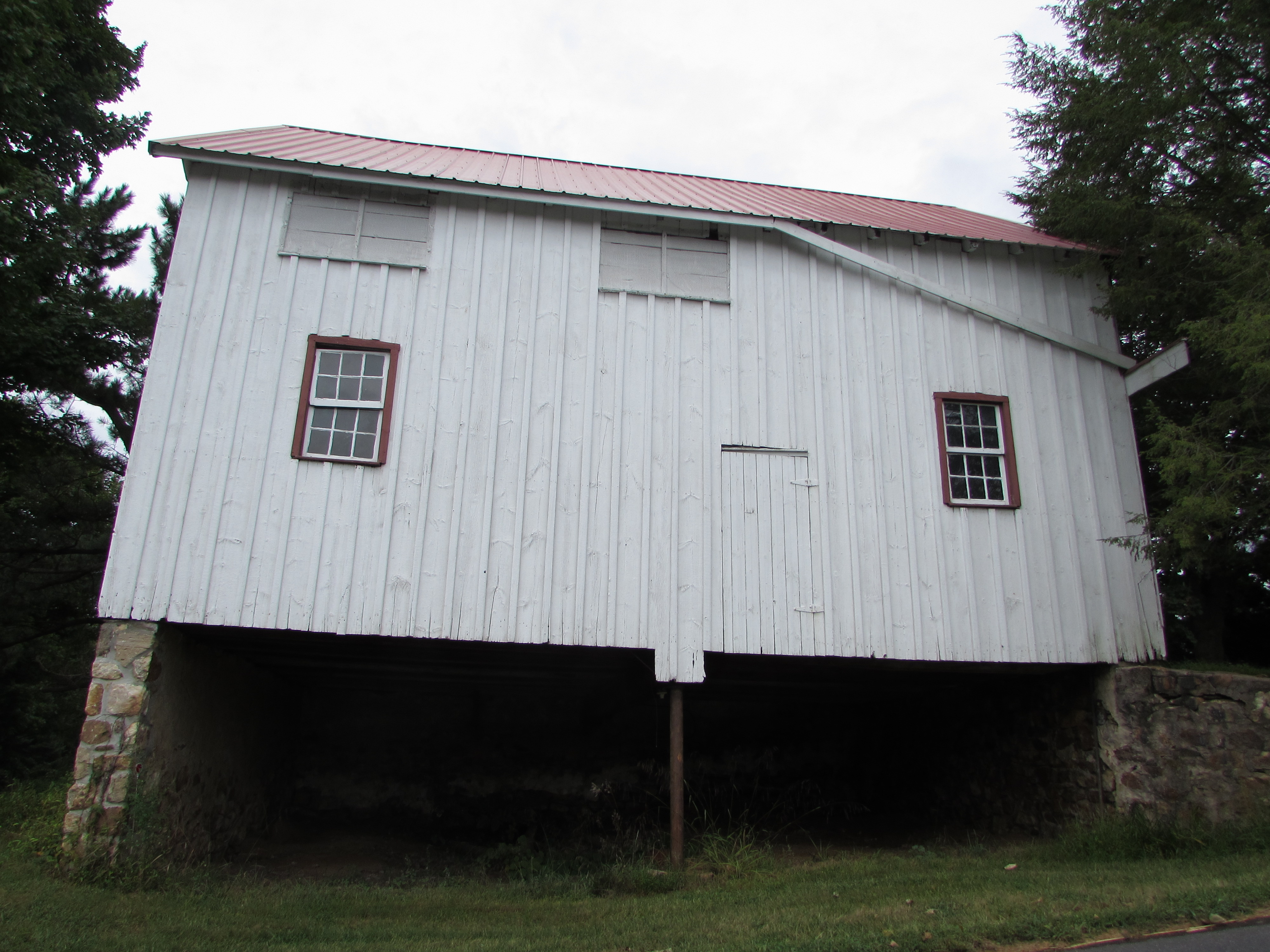
- Granary at the Bartley–Tweed Farm

- Location within Delaware Location within the United States
- Location: Foxden Rd. east of Polly Drummond Rd., near Newark, Delaware
- Coordinates: 39°43′13″N 75°42′59″W
- Area: 4.5 acres (1.8 ha)
- Built: c. 1798, c. 1825, c. 1835
- Architectural style: Federal, Bi-level barn
- MPS: Agricultural Buildings and Complexes in Mill Creek Hundred, 1800-1840 TR
- NRHP reference No.: 86003084
- Added to NRHP: November 13, 1986

Bartley–Tweed Farm is a historic farm located near Newark, Delaware, United States. The property includes three contributing buildings: a stuccoed stone and brick house, a frame bank barn built about 1835, and a late 19th-century frame carriage house / granary. The stone section of the house dates to the late-18th century and the brick section to about 1825. The brick section has Federal style details.

It was added to the National Register of Historic Places in 1986.
