= Meeteer House =

Historic house in Delaware, United States

- U.S. National Register of Historic Places
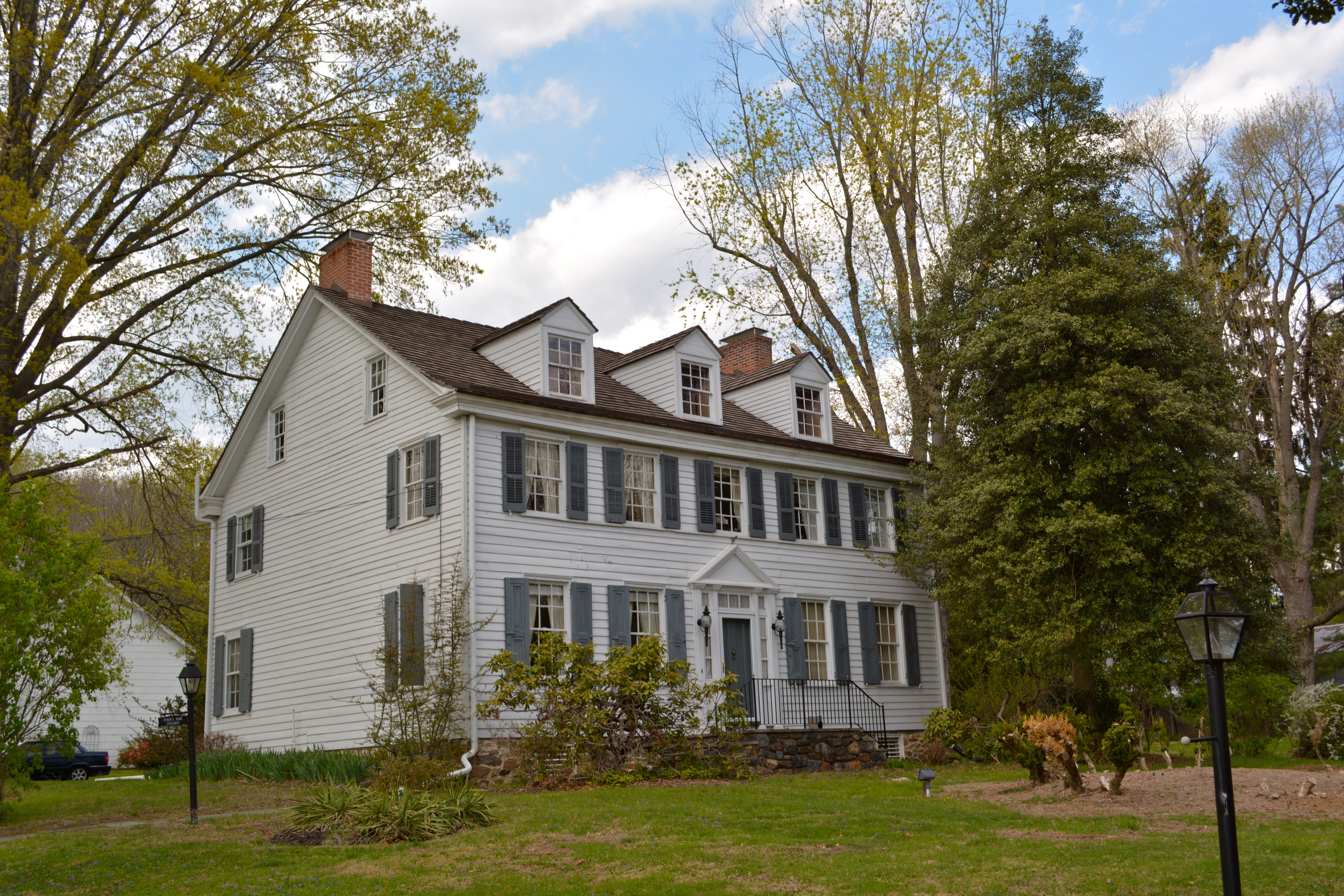

- Location within Delaware Location within the United States
- Location: 801 Kirkwood Highway in Mill Creek Hundred, Newark, Delaware
- Coordinates: 39°41′45″N 75°43′07″W
- Area: 3.4 acres (1.4 ha)
- Built: 1822–1828
- Architectural style: Federal
- NRHP reference No.: 93000888
- Added to NRHP: September 2, 1993

Meeteer House is a historic home located at Newark in New Castle County, Delaware. It was built between 1822 and 1828 and is a 2 1/2-story, five-bay, double-pile frame dwelling in a vernacular Federal style. It sits on a raised basement and has a gable roof with dormers. Also on the property is a contributing 19th-century frame carriage house. The house was built by a prominent paper-milling family, the Meeteers.

It was added to the National Register of Historic Places in 1993.
