= Walker's Mill and Walker's Bank =

Historic house in Delaware, United States

- U.S. National Register of Historic Places
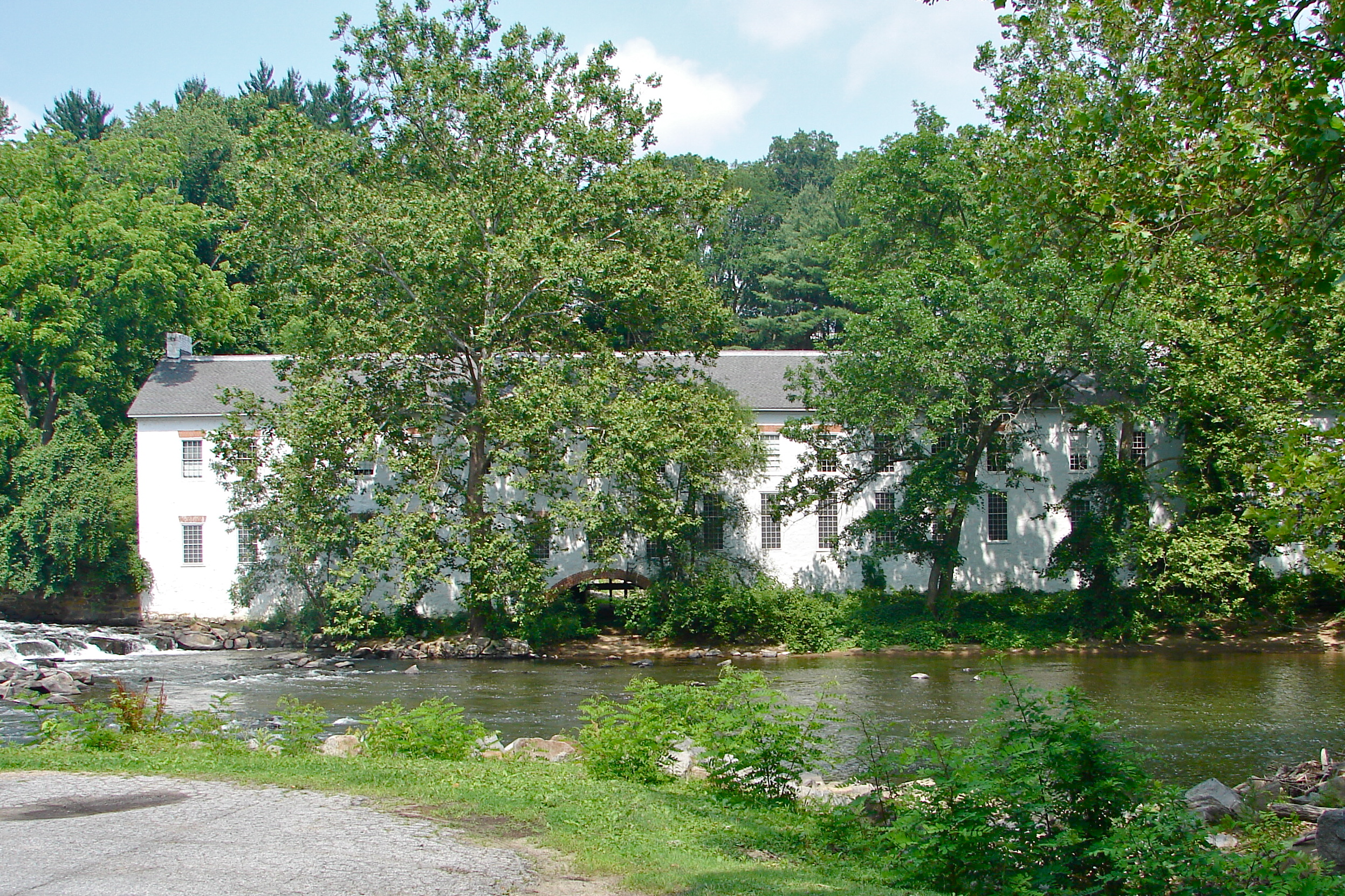
- Walker's Mill, June 2011

- Location within Delaware Location within the United States
- Location: Walkers Mill Road, near Wilmington, Delaware
- Coordinates: 39.77068°N 75.57849°W
- Area: 9 acres (3.6 ha)
- Built: 1813-1815
- NRHP reference No.: 72000296
- Added to NRHP: February 1, 1972

Walker's Mill and Walker's Bank, also known as Simsville, Siddall's Mill, and "Big White Mill", is a historic spinning cotton mill and worker's dwelling block located near Wilmington, New Castle County, Delaware. Walker's Mill was built between 1813 and 1815, and is a 2 1/2-story, T-shaped, stone building.

== History ==
It measures approximately 100 feet by 225 feet and features a tower topped by a cupola. Walker's Bank is a two- to three-story rectangular stone building built in 1813 and consisting of four worker's homes. It measures 44 feet by 75 feet and each long side features a porch divided among the four units.

It was added to the National Register of Historic Places in 1972.

The Ashford family bought Walker's Mill and Walker's Bank in 2002. They renovated Walker's Mill into an office for their building, but did not find a use for Walker's Bank, which has limited parking and is under deed restrictions. It decayed to the point of near-collapse, and they applied for a demolition permit for it in 2018. After a nine-month delay for review by the New Castle County historic review board, the permit was granted late in the year.
