= Ott's Chapel =

Historic chapel in Delaware, US

- U.S. National Register of Historic Places
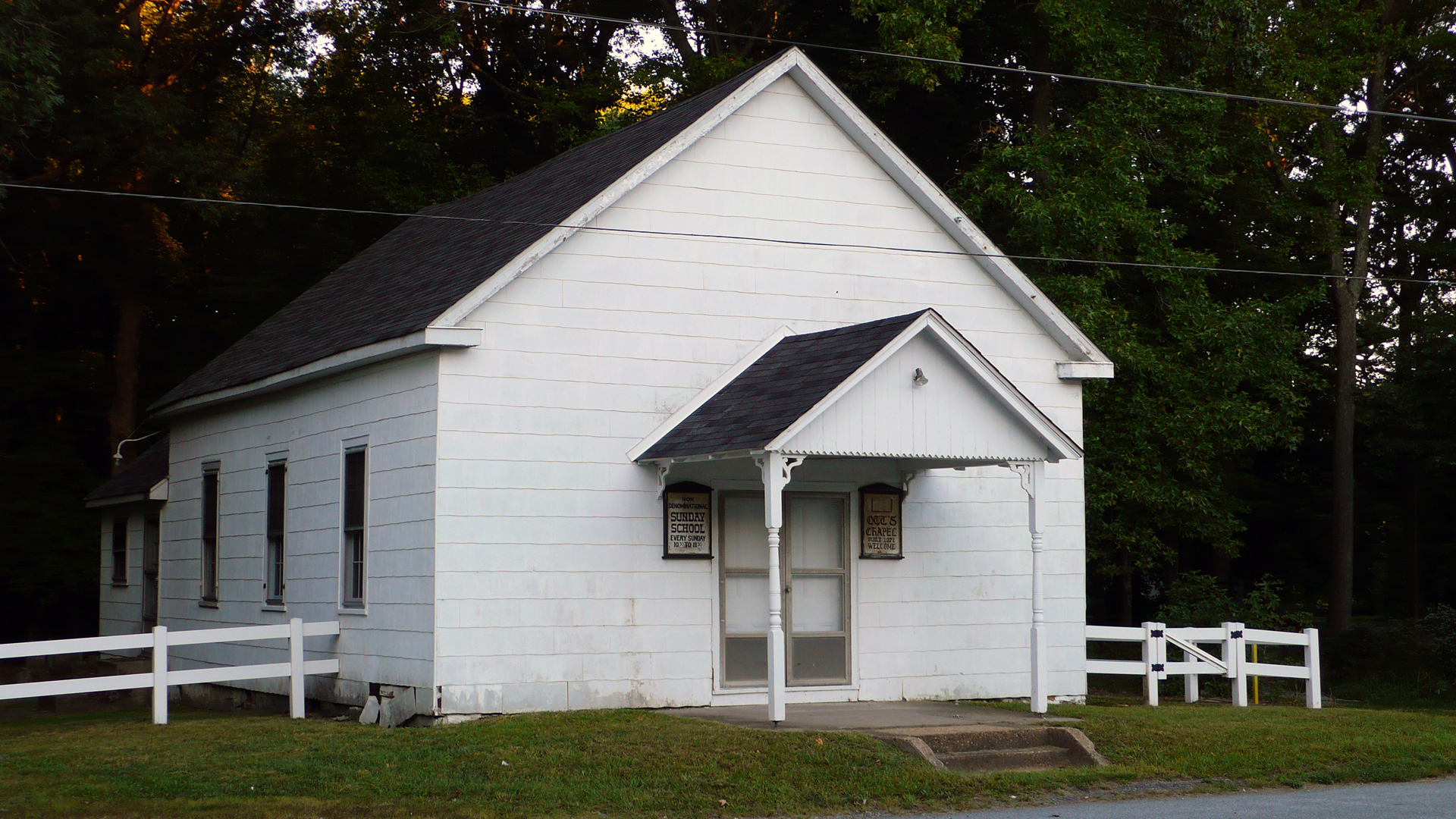
- Ott's Chapel in 2012

- Location within Delaware Location within the United States
- Location: 1655 Otts Chapel Rd., near Newark, Delaware
- Coordinates: 39.63411°N 75.77857°W
- Area: 0.5 acres (0.20 ha)
- Built: 1871
- NRHP reference No.: 86001555
- Added to NRHP: August 13, 1986

Ott's Chapel (also known as Ott's Chapel Sunday School) is a historic chapel in New Castle County, Delaware, located roughly halfway between Newark, Delaware and Elkton, Maryland on Ott's Chapel Road.

It was built in 1871 and added to the National Register of Historic Places in 1986.

== History ==
The chapel was built by Stephen Ott, a local farmer who also hosted nondenominational prayer meetings at his house. After the meetings grew too large, Ott built the chapel with the help of his neighbors in 1871. Ott conducted prayer meetings and Sunday school at the chapel until his death in 1875, after which his wife Jane took over until 1881. The chapel was later run by George A. Blake from 1889 to 1910, and has continued to host nondenominational prayer meetings and Sunday school since.

== Architecture ==
Ott's Chapel is a small, one-story frame building with clapboard siding and a gable roof, typical of the rural church architecture of 19th-century Delaware. The chapel is one bay wide by three bays deep, with a gable-roofed front porch, and stands on a rubble stone foundation. The interior of the building consists of a single room with a high ceiling and elaborate pressed tin ornamentation.
