= Thomas Justis House =

Historic house in Delaware, United States

- U.S. National Register of Historic Places
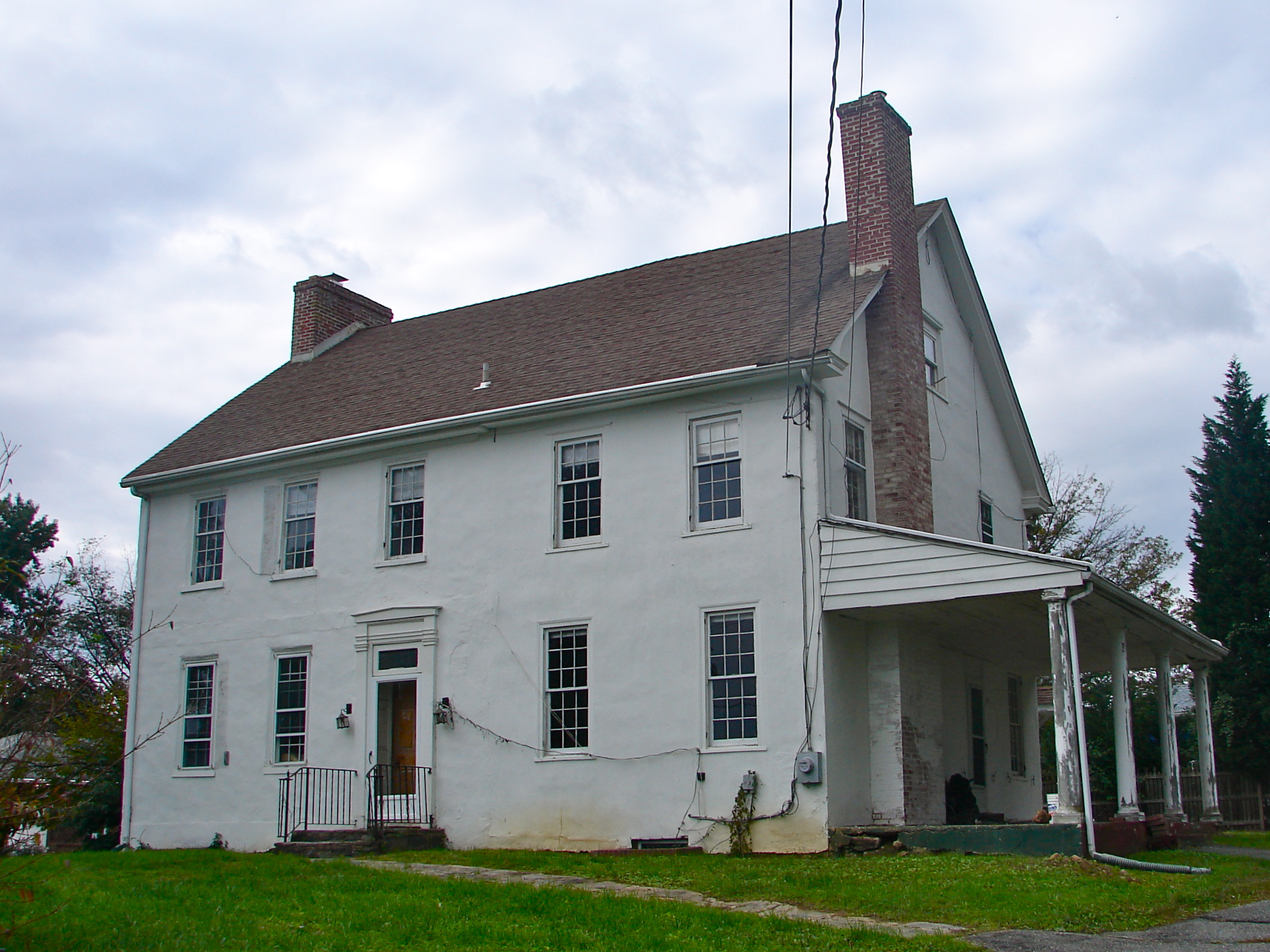
- Thomas Justis House, October 2011

- Location within Delaware Location within the United States
- Location: 1001 Milltown Rd., Mill Creek Hundred, near Wilmington, Delaware
- Coordinates: 39°44′3″N 75°39′31″W
- Area: 0.4 acres (0.16 ha)
- Built: 1804-1816
- Architectural style: Vernacular Federal
- NRHP reference No.: 93000989
- Added to NRHP: September 23, 1993

Thomas Justis House is a historic home located near Wilmington, New Castle County, Delaware. The original section was built between 1804 and 1816, as a stuccoed stone, two-story, three-bay, gable-roofed building laid out on a double pile, side passage plan. About 1900, a frame, two-story, two-bay, gable-roofed wing was built on the northeast endwall. With the addition, the house gained the appearance of a five-bay, center door dwelling. The house is in a vernacular Federal style.

It was added to the National Register of Historic Places in 1993.
