= Glynrich =

Historic house in Delaware, United States

- U.S. National Register of Historic Places
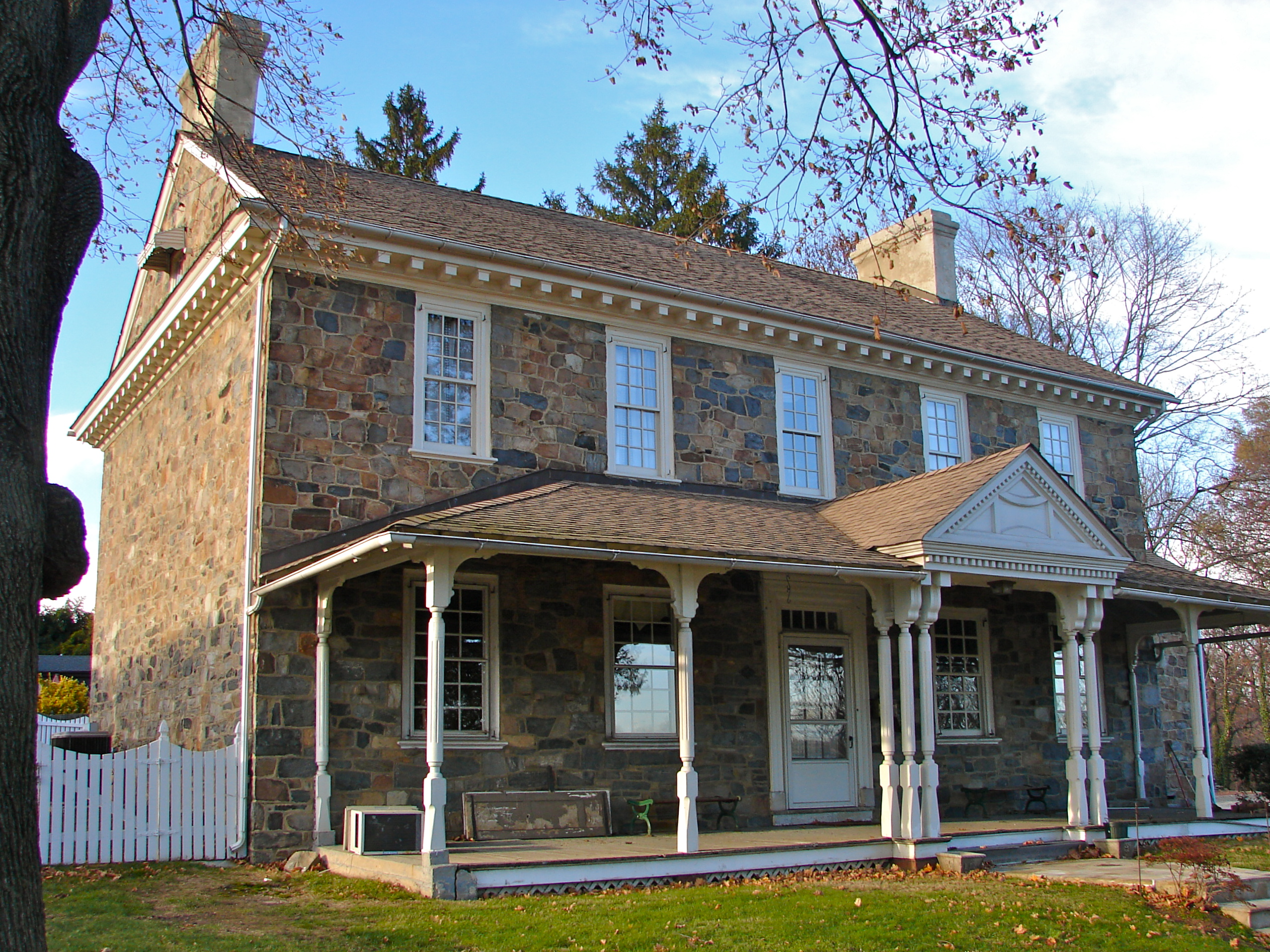
- Richard Richardson House, November 2010

- Location within Delaware Location within the United States
- Location: Mill Rd. and Race St., Wilmington, Delaware
- Coordinates: 39.7321°N 75.5823°W
- Area: 2 acres (0.81 ha)
- Built: 1723, 1765
- NRHP reference No.: 79000633
- Added to NRHP: November 1, 1979

Glynrich is the site for two historic homes: the Richard Richardson House and the Brick Mill House. They are located at Wilmington, Delaware, United States. The Brick Mill House, also known as the John Richardson House, was built about 1723, and is a two-story, three-bay, gable roof brick structure with Flemish bond and glazed headers on the facade rising from a full raised basement. It has a one-bay, hipped roof, wooden entrance porch. The Richard Richardson House was built in 1765, and is a two-story five-bay, center-hall, double pile with a lower single pile two-story wing at the east end. It is in the Georgian style. It has a five-bay, hipped roof Georgian Revival porch added around 1900. The property was the site of extensive milling activities on the Mill Creek in the 18th and 19th centuries.

It was added to the National Register of Historic Places in 1979.
