= Charles Springer Tavern =

Historic tavern in Delaware, US

- U.S. National Register of Historic Places
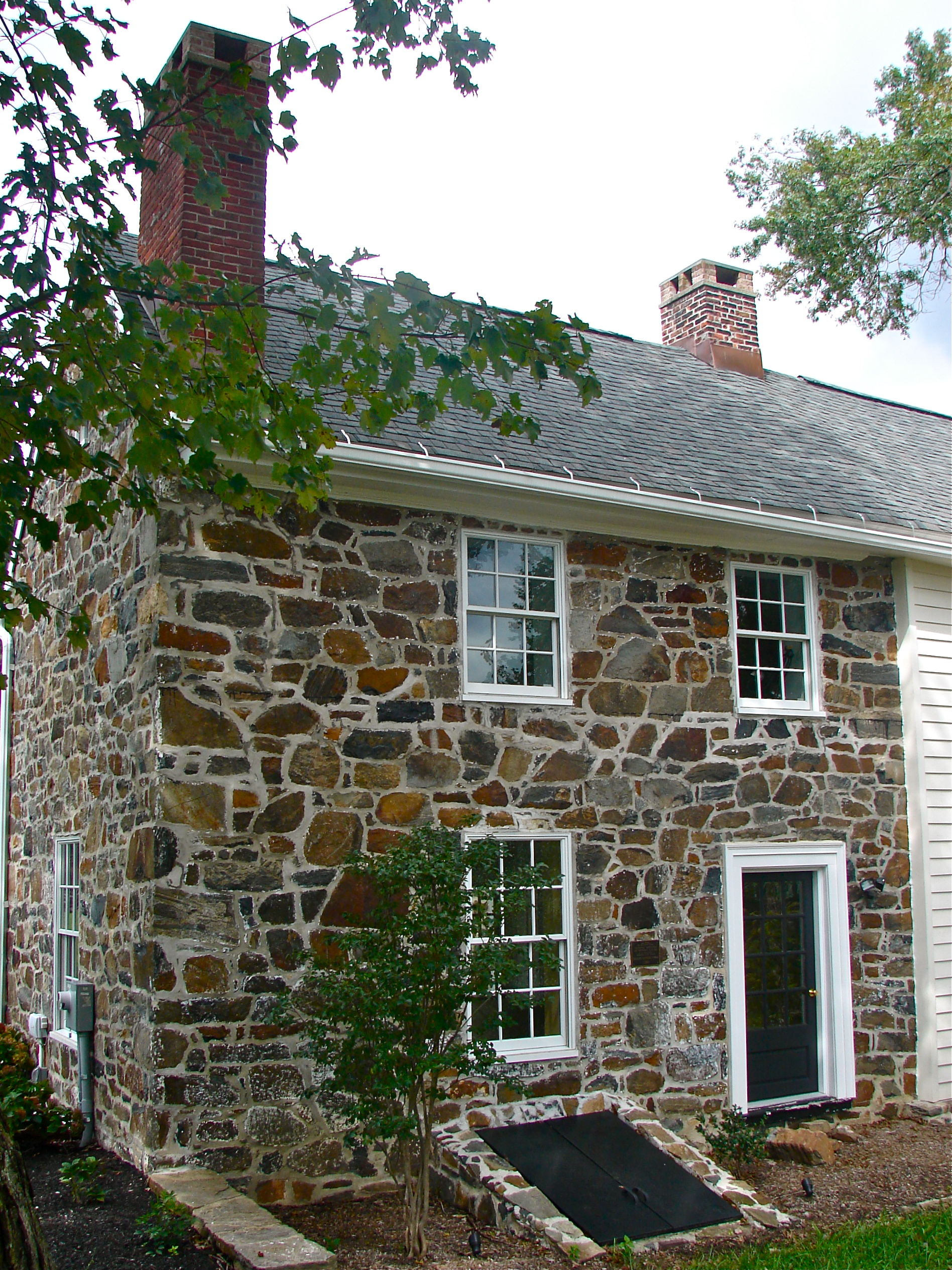
- Charles Springer Tavern, October 2011

- Location within Delaware Location within the United States
- Location: 7 Stone Barn Ln., Christiana Hundred, near Wilmington, Delaware
- Coordinates: 39.76172°N 75.62025°W
- Area: 2 acres (0.81 ha)
- Architectural style: Federal, Vernacular Federal
- NRHP reference No.: 92001142
- Added to NRHP: September 11, 1992

Charles Springer Tavern, also known as the Oak Hill Inn, Four Mile Inn, and Sign of the Three Tons, is a historic inn and tavern located near Wilmington in New Castle County, Delaware, United States. The building is a two-story, log and stone building that evolved in four major construction phases during the period from 1750 to 1850. The oldest section is a two-story, two-bay, gable-roofed log section. A stone, two-story, two-bay, gable-roofed section was added about 1780; the roof level, window and door openings and floor levels were subsequently raised on the original log section; and a stone, 1 1/2-story lean-to was added on the rear wall of the log section. It has been a residence since the early 20th century. It is in a vernacular Federal style. Also on the property are the contributing ruins of a stone barn built in 1852, the ruins of a stone springhouse, and a stone mileage marker identifying the location as being four miles from the City of Wilmington.

It was added to the National Register of Historic Places in 1992.
