= Fell Historic District =

Historic district in Delaware, United States

- U.S. National Register of Historic Places
- U.S. Historic district
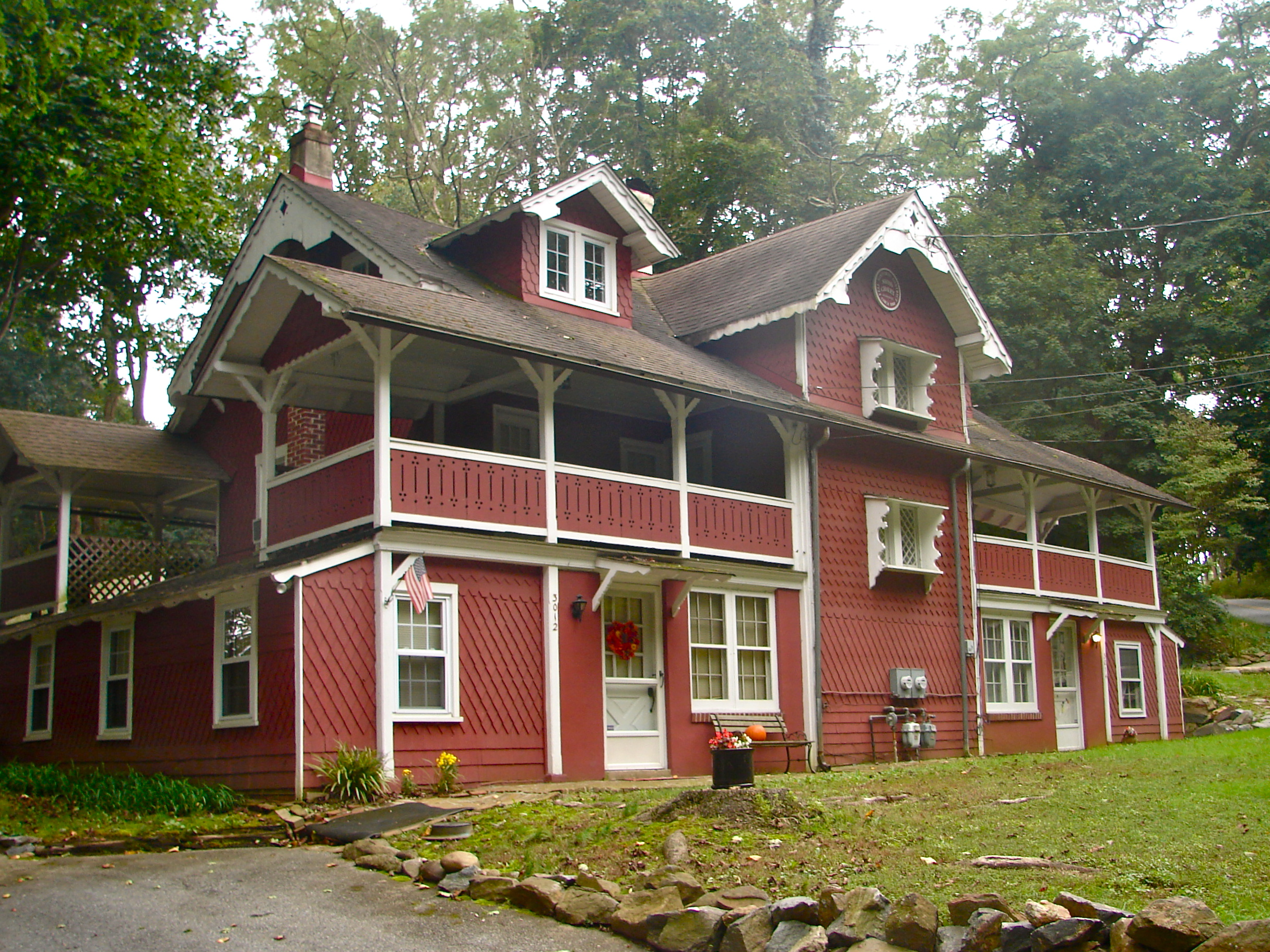
- Swiss chalet style tenant house, Fell Historic District, October 2011

- Location within Delaware Location within the United States
- Location: Faulkland Rd. and New Fell's Lane, Wilmington, Delaware
- Coordinates: 39°44′56″N 75°38′16″W
- Area: 16 acres (6.5 ha)
- Built: c. 1803-1925
- Architectural style: Mixed (more Than 2 Styles From Different Periods)
- NRHP reference No.: 83001335
- Added to NRHP: June 16, 1983

Fell Historic District is a national historic district located at Wilmington, New Castle County, Delaware. It encompasses eight contributing buildings in a steeply sloped area along Red Clay Creek. The area developed in the 19th century as a wealthy gentleman's country manufacturing/farming estate. It includes the stuccoed fieldstone, Greek Revival style Fell Mansion (c. 1835); a Romanesque Revival stone carriage house (1893); a Carpenter Gothic frame gatehouse (c. 1860); two frame tenant houses (c. 1860), one of which was built in a "Swiss Chalet" style; a stone barn and a stuccoed stone miller's residence (c. 1800); and a stone Georgian Revival dwelling dating from 1925.

It was added to the National Register of Historic Places in 1983.
