= James Steel House =

Historic house in Delaware, US

- U.S. National Register of Historic Places
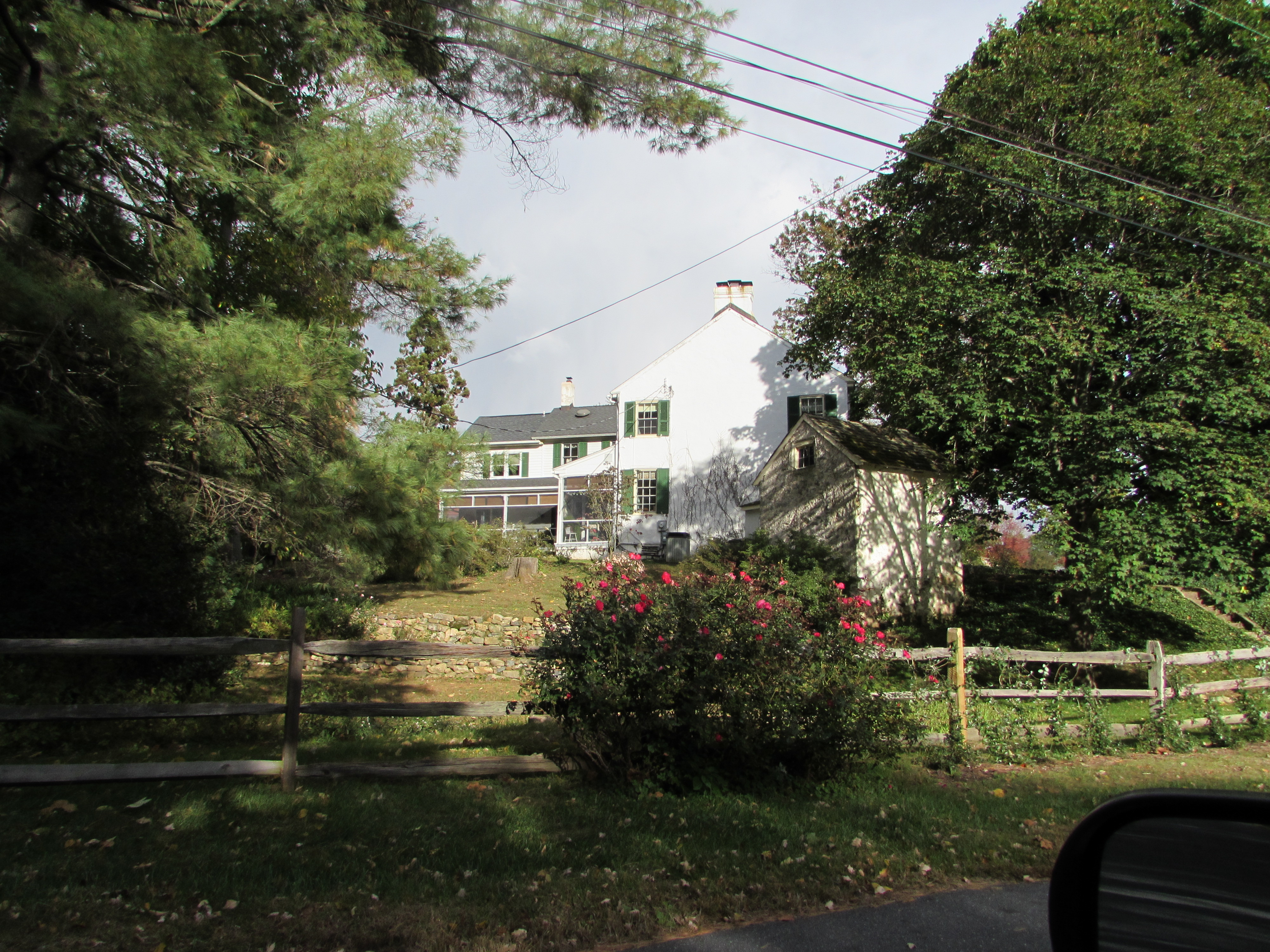
- The James Steel house, with frame addition (left), the original house (center), and adjacent springhouse/smokehouse (right).

- Location within Delaware Location within the United States
- Location: 1016 W. Church St., Newark, Delaware
- Coordinates: 39.691217°N 75.785858°W
- Area: 15.8 acres (6.4 ha)
- Built: 1882
- Architectural style: Classical Revival, Colonial
- MPS: White Clay Creek Hundred MRA
- NRHP reference No.: 83001341
- Added to NRHP: August 19, 1983

The James Steel House is a historic home located at Newark in New Castle County, Delaware, United States. The original section, a two-story, two-bay, double-pile, stuccoed brick structure, is dated to the late 18th century. It was doubled in size about 1882, with the facade addition of a two-story, two-bay, frame wing. It features a two-story bay window on the endwall, a pointed-arch attic window, and German siding. The main block has had a series of rear additions during the late 19th and early 20th centuries, creating an overall T-plan.

It was listed on the National Register of Historic Places in 1983.
