= James Armor House =

Historic house in Delaware, US

- U.S. National Register of Historic Places
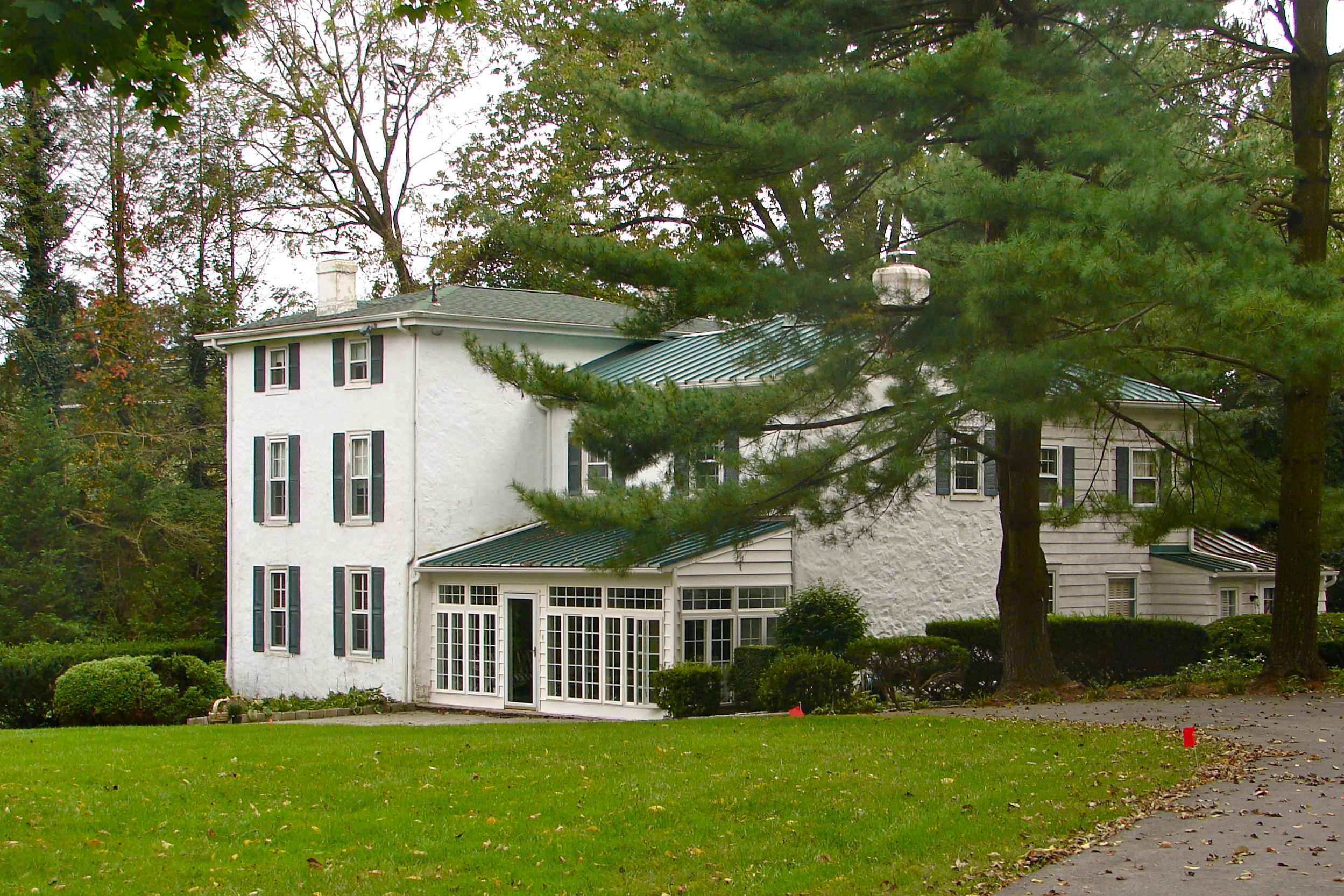
- James Armor House, October 2011

- Location within Delaware Location within the United States
- Location: 3 Courtney Road, Christiana Hundred, near Wilmington, Delaware
- Coordinates: 39.761626°N 75.615885°W
- Area: 2.5 acres (1.0 ha)
- Built: c. 1804
- Architectural style: Italianate
- NRHP reference No.: 92001141
- Added to NRHP: August 31, 1992

James Armor House is a historic home located near Wilmington, Delaware, United States. It is a 2 1/2-story, stuccoed stone and frame dwelling that was constructed in three major building phases. It consists of a two-story stone rear wing dating to about 1804, a 2 1/2-story vernacular Italianate style stone main block built about 1850, and two-story Colonial Revival style frame wing built in the 1930s. Also on the property is a contributing garage/workshop built in the 1930s.

It was added to the National Register of Historic Places in 1992.
