= Rosemont (Wilmington, Delaware) =

Historic house in Delaware, US

- U.S. National Register of Historic Places
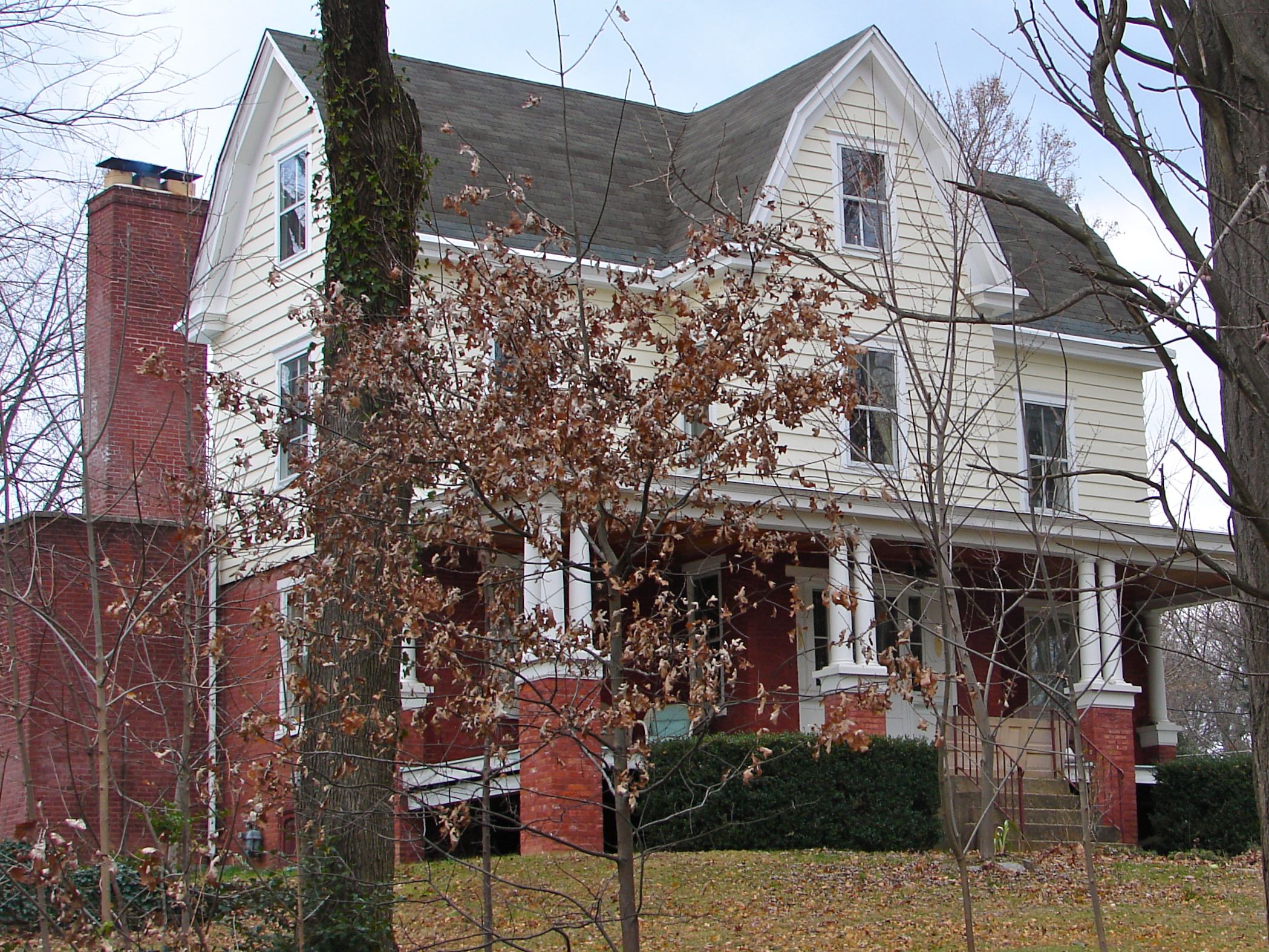
- Rosemont, December 2010

- Location within Delaware Location within the United States
- Location: 15½ Cragmere Road, Wilmington, Delaware
- Coordinates: 39.77004°N 75.49163°W
- Area: 1 acre (0.40 ha)
- Built: c. 1893
- Architectural style: cross gambrel roof eclectic
- NRHP reference No.: 09000051
- Added to NRHP: February 27, 2009

Rosemont, also known as Joseph W. and Ida Guest House, is a historic home located at 15 1/2 Cragmere Road, Wilmington in New Castle County, Delaware, United States. It was built about 1893, and is a 2 1/2-story, three-bay, T-shaped vernacular brick-and-frame farmhouse. It consists of a gambrel-roofed main block with projecting central bay, with a gable-roofed rear wing. The house has elements of Stick, Queen Anne, and Colonial Revival-style detailing. Also on the property is a 2 1/2-story frame carriage house.

It was listed on the National Register of Historic Places in March 2009. The property was the Highlighted Property of the Week when the National Park Service released its weekly list of March 6, 2009.
