= J. Eastburn Barn =

Historic place near Newark, Delaware, United States

- U.S. National Register of Historic Places
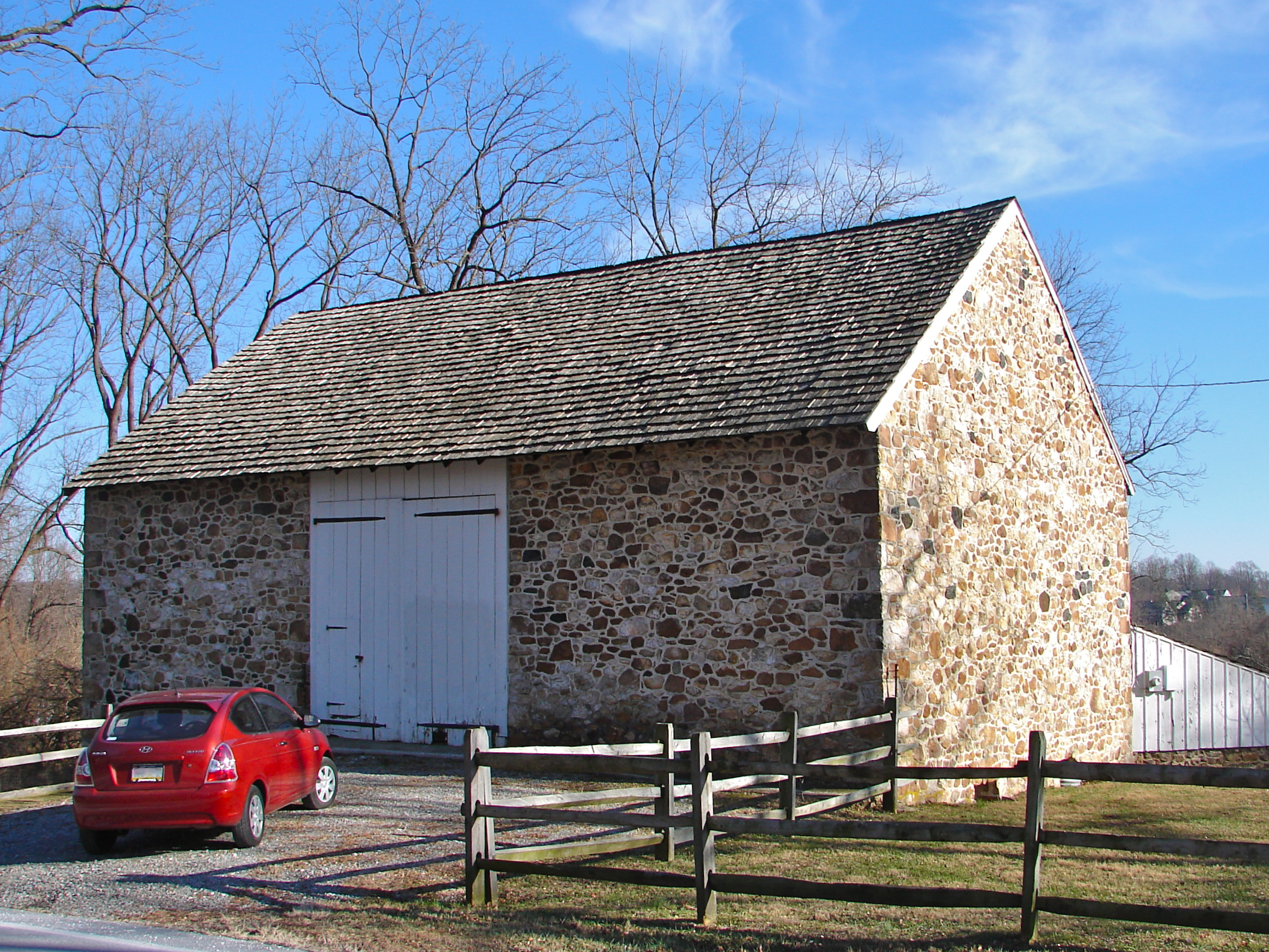
- J. Eastburn Barn, December 2010

- Location within Delaware Location within the United States
- Location: Pleasant Hill Rd. southwest of Corner Ketch Rd., near Newark, Delaware
- Coordinates: 39.735535°N 75.731561°W
- Area: 7.5 acres (3.0 ha)
- Built: c. 1809
- Architectural style: Bi-level barn
- MPS: Agricultural Buildings and Complexes in Mill Creek Hundred, 1800--1840 TR
- NRHP reference No.: 86003088
- Added to NRHP: November 13, 1986

J. Eastburn Barn is a historic barn located near Newark, New Castle County, Delaware. It was built about 1809, and is a bi-level, stone structure with a frame front wall and a recessed stable wall. It is constructed of light-colored fieldstone with large, roughly dressed, rectangular fieldstone quoins. The barn measures 37 feet by 52 feet.

It was added to the National Register of Historic Places in 1986.
