= J. Lindsay Barn =

American historic barn in Delaware

- U.S. National Register of Historic Places
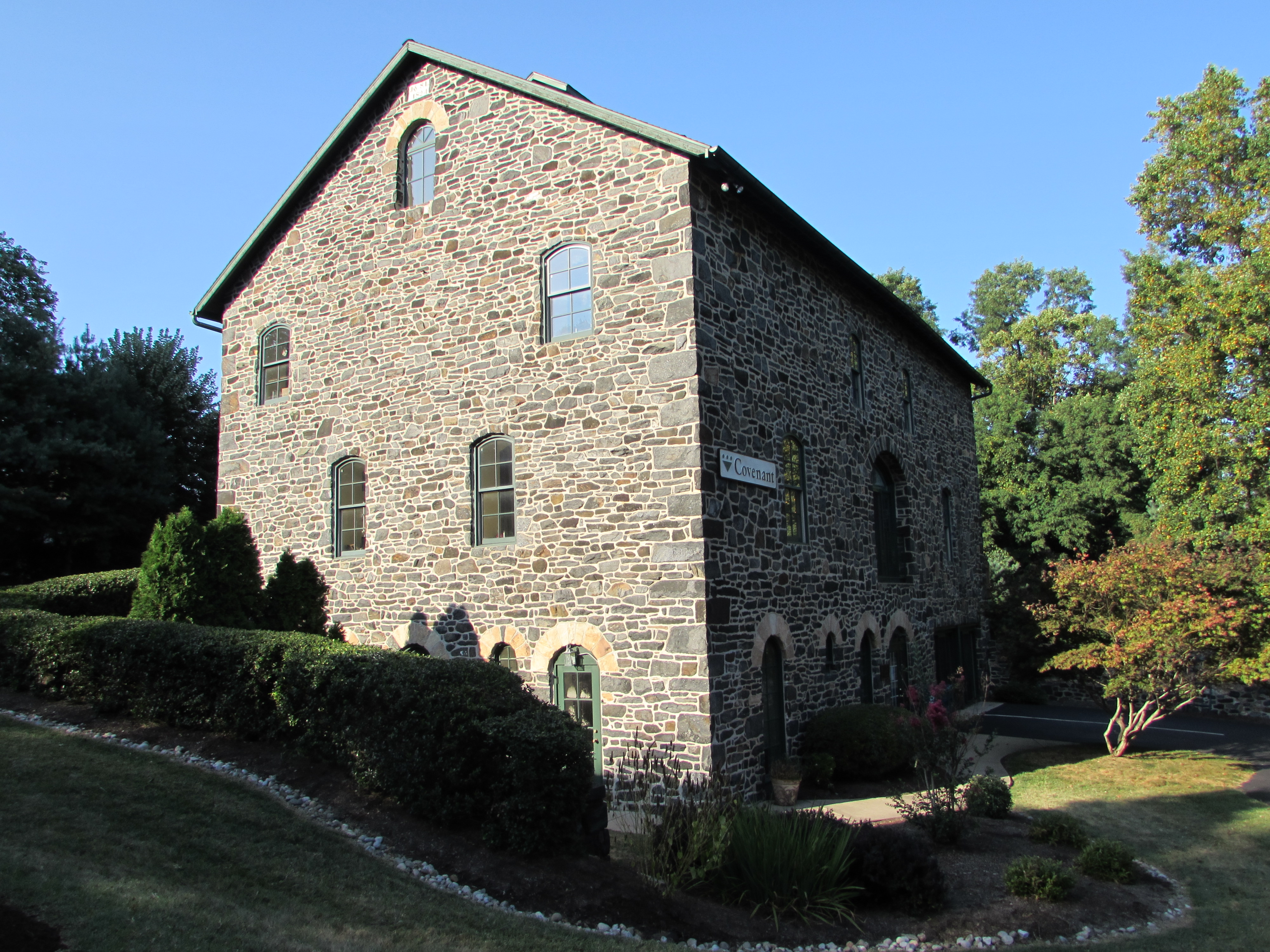
- Side and rear of the barn, showing the large quoins and a datestone in the gable.

- Location within Delaware Location within the United States
- Location: 15 Middleton Dr., near Newark, Delaware
- Coordinates: 39.751199°N 75.687882°W
- Area: 1.3 acres (0.53 ha)
- Built: c. 1820
- MPS: Agricultural Buildings and Complexes in Mill Creek Hundred, 1800-1840 TR
- NRHP reference No.: 86003089
- Added to NRHP: November 13, 1986

J. Lindsay Barn is a historic barn located near Newark, New Castle County, Delaware. It was built around 1820, and is a large, bi-level stone building with fieldstone walls accented by round-arched doorways and windows. It features large rectangular and square quoins and two gable cupolas atop the gable roof. Also on the property is a 19th-century stone outbuilding.

It was added to the National Register of Historic Places in 1986.
