= David Eastburn Farm =

- U.S. National Register of Historic Places
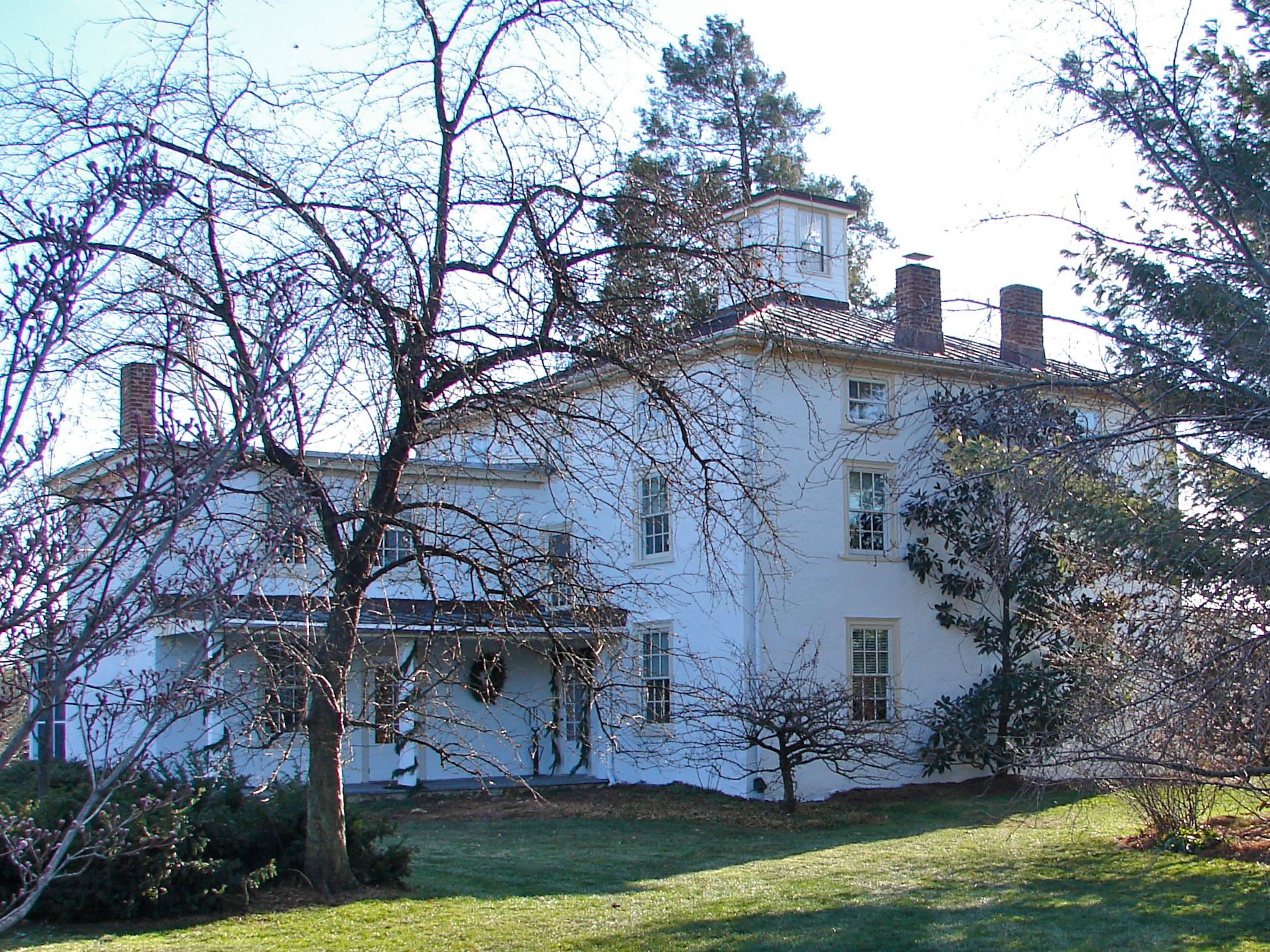
- David Eastburn House, December 2010

- Location within Delaware Location within the United States
- Location: 2 Bristol Ln., near Newark, Delaware
- Coordinates: 39.746672°N 75.735886°W
- Area: 32 acres (13 ha)
- Built: c. 1800
- Architectural style: Bi-level barn
- MPS: Agricultural Buildings and Complexes in Mill Creek Hundred, 1800-1840 TR
- NRHP reference No.: 86003087
- Added to NRHP: November 13, 1986

David Eastburn Farm is a historic farm located near Newark, New Castle County, Delaware. The property includes eight contributing buildings: a frame bank barn (c. 1825), a stone dwelling (c. 1850), a stone tenant house possibly dating to the 18th century, and five outbuildings. The dwelling is a three-story, double pile, stuccoed stone building with a pyramidal roof crowned by a flat-roofed belvedere. It has a two-story, hip-roofed rear wing.

It was added to the National Register of Historic Places in 1986.
