= William Morgan Farm =

- U.S. National Register of Historic Places
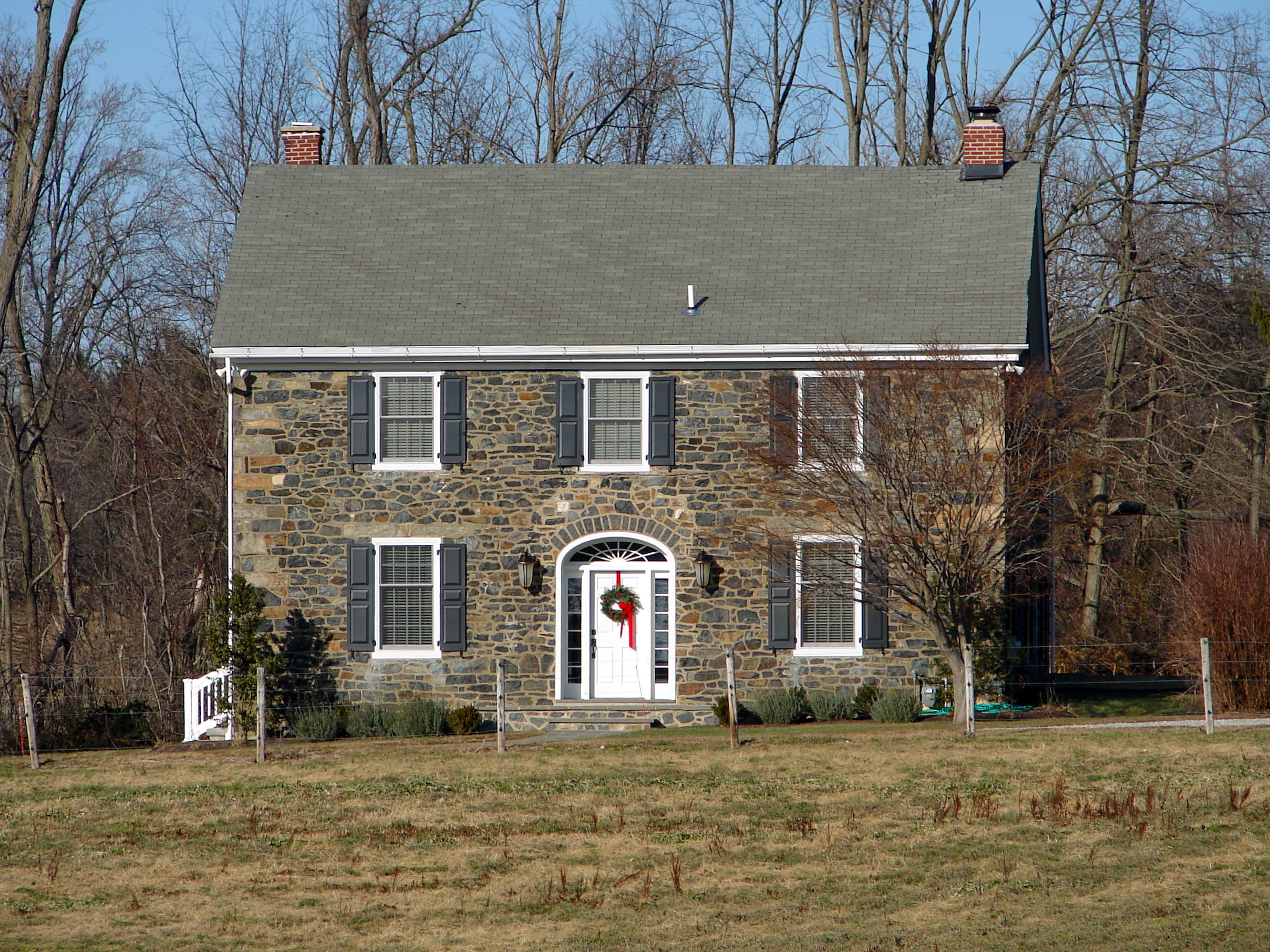
- William Morgan Farmhouse, December 2010

- Location within Delaware Location within the United States
- Location: 821–824 Doe Run Rd., near Newark, Delaware
- Coordinates: 39°45′7″N 75°44′25″W
- Area: 8.5 acres (3.4 ha)
- Built: 1809, 1813
- MPS: Agricultural Buildings and Complexes in Mill Creek Hundred, 1800-1840 TR
- NRHP reference No.: 86003099
- Added to NRHP: November 13, 1986

William Morgan Farm is a historic farm located near Newark, New Castle County, Delaware. The property includes two contributing buildings. They are a stone bank barn (1809) and a stone dwelling (1813). The barn is constructed of uncoursed, rubble fieldstone and is cornered with large fieldstone quoins. The house is a two-story, three-bay, gable-roofed fieldstone building with an original two-story, gable-roofed rear ell.

It was added to the National Register of Historic Places in 1986.
