= Ashland, Delaware =

Unincorporated community in Delaware, United States

- Unincorporated community
- Location within Delaware Location within the United States
- Coordinates: 39°47′59″N 75°39′26″W
- Country: United States
- State: Delaware
- County: New Castle
- Elevation: 157 ft (48 m)
- Time zone: UTC-5 (Eastern (EST))
  - Summer (DST): UTC-4 (EDT)
- Area code: 302
- GNIS feature ID: 216020

Ashland is an unincorporated community in New Castle County, Delaware, United States. Ashland is located at the intersection of Delaware Route 82 and Barley Mill Road along the Red Clay Creek.

== History ==
Ashland's population was 150 in 1890, and was 146 in 1900.

The Ashland Covered Bridge was listed on the National Register of Historic Places in 1973.
