= Burrows Run =

Burrows Run Tributary to Red Clay Creek
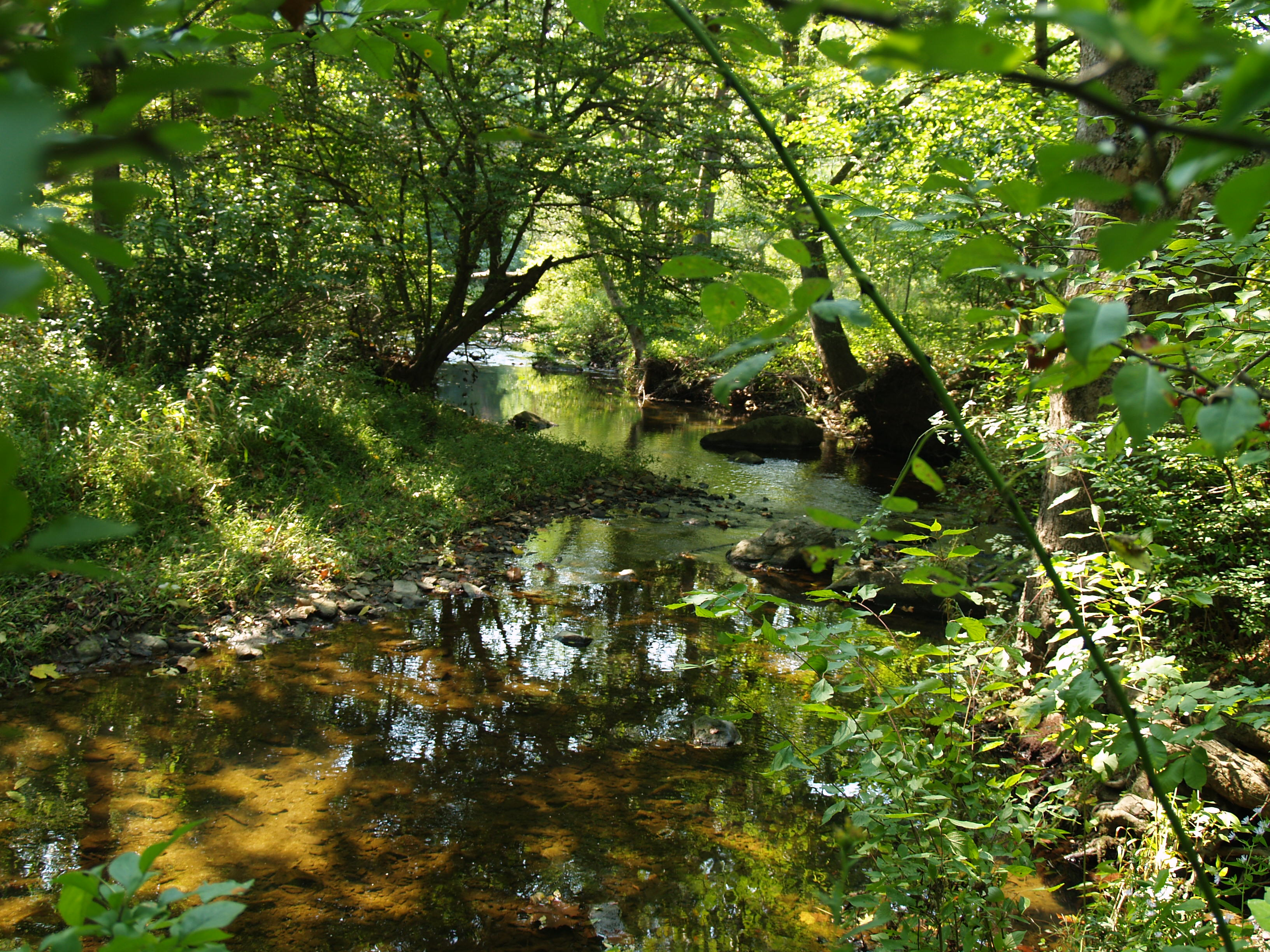
- Burrows Run in Delaware

- Location within Delaware Location within the United States

Location
- Country: United States
- State: Delaware
- County: New Castle

Physical characteristics
- Source: Craigs Mill Run divide
  - location: Pond at Mendenhall, Pennsylvania
  - coordinates: 39°51′07″N 075°38′40″W
  - elevation: 325 ft (99 m)
- Mouth: Red Clay Creek
  - location: about 0.25 miles east of Ashland, Delaware
  - coordinates: 39°47′52″N 075°38′13″W
  - elevation: 135 ft (41 m)
- Length: 4.73 mi (7.61 km)
- Basin size: 7.16 square miles (18.5 km^{2})
- Discharge
  - average: 11.28 cu ft/s (0.319 m^{3}/s) at mouth with Red Clay Creek

Basin features
- Progression: Red Clay Creek → White Clay Creek → Christina River → Delaware River → Delaware Bay → Atlantic Ocean
- River system: Christina River
- Tributaries
  - left: unnamed tributaries
  - right: unnamed tributaries
- Waterbodies: Shadowbrook Pond
- Bridges: Burrows Run Road, Spring Mill Road, Burnt Mill Road, Center Mill Road, Snuff Mill Road, Old Kennett Road, Way Road

Burrows Run is a 4.73 mi (7.61 km) long 2nd order tributary to Red Clay Creek in New Castle County, Delaware.

== Variant names ==
According to the Geographic Names Information System, it has also been known historically as:

- Barris Run
- Burris Run
- Burroughs Brook

== Course ==
Burrows Run rises on the Craigs Mill Run divide at Mendenhall in Chester County, Pennsylvania. Burrows Run then flows south into Delaware to meet Red Clay Creek about 0.25 miles east of Ashland, Delaware.

== Watershed ==
Burrows Run drains 7.16 square miles (18.5 km^{2}) of area, receives about 48.6 in/year of precipitation, has a topographic wetness index of 393.10 and is about 37.5% forested.

== See also ==
- List of rivers of Delaware
- List of rivers of Pennsylvania
