= Walnut Run (Broad Run) =

Location
- Country: United States
- State: Pennsylvania
- County: Chester

Physical characteristics
- Source
  - location: New Garden Township, Chester County, Pennsylvania
- Mouth: Broad Run
  - location: London Britain Township, Chester County, Pennsylvania
  - coordinates: 39.7678°N 75.7610°W

Basin features
- Progression: Broad Run → White Clay Creek → Christina River → Delaware River → Delaware Bay → Atlantic Ocean
- River system: White Clay Creek

Walnut Run is a small tributary of Broad Run in Chester County, Pennsylvania, United States. The stream flows through the rural and suburban landscape of New Garden Township and London Britain Township before joining Broad Run upstream of its confluence with the White Clay Creek.

The headwaters of Walnut Run rise in gently sloping terrain north of the Pennsylvania–Delaware state line. The stream flows generally southward through agricultural lands, woodlots, and residential areas. Near its lower course, Walnut Run passes through portions of the White Clay Creek Preserve shortly before entering Broad Run.

Walnut Run is part of the greater White Clay watershed, which has been designated as a component of the National Wild and Scenic River due to its ecological and historical significance. Although Walnut Run itself is not individually designated, it contributes to the hydrology and ecological quality of the protected system.

== See also ==
- Broad Run (White Clay Creek)
- White Clay Creek
- List of rivers of Pennsylvania
