= List of bridges documented by the Historic American Engineering Record in Delaware =

This is a list of bridges documented by the Historic American Engineering Record in the U.S. state of Delaware.

== Bridges ==
| Survey No. | Name (as assigned by HAER) | Status | Type | Built | Documented | Carries | Crosses | Location | County | Coordinates |
|---|---|---|---|---|---|---|---|---|---|---|
| DE-12-B | Pennsylvania Railroad Improvements, Swing Bridge | Extant | Swing span | 1902 | 1977 | Northeast Corridor | Brandywine River | Wilmington | New Castle | 39°44′23″N 75°32′13″W |
| DE-12-C | Pennsylvania Railroad Improvements, Brick Arch Viaduct | Extant | Brick arch | 1902 | 1977 | Northeast Corridor | City streets | Wilmington | New Castle | 39°44′08″N 75°33′52″W |
| DE-20 | Augustine Bridge | Replaced | Pratt truss | 1885 | 1979 | Road 49 (Augustine Cutoff) | Brandywine River | Wilmington | New Castle | 39°45′39″N 75°33′25″W |
| DE-22 | Rehoboth Avenue Bridge | Replaced | Rolling lift (Scherzer) bascule | 1926 | 1984 | DE 1A (Rehoboth Avenue) | Lewes and Rehoboth Canal | Rehoboth Beach | Sussex | 38°42′52″N 75°05′34″W |
| DE-25 | Thompson's Bridge | Replaced | Steel built-up girder (concrete-encased) | 1935 | 1990 | DE 92 (Thompsons Bridge Road) | Brandywine River | Wilmington | New Castle | 39°49′01″N 75°34′11″W |
| DE-27 | Heald Street Bridge | Rehabilitated | Reinforced concrete flat slab | 1942 | 1990 | US 13 (South Heald Street) | Former Pennsylvania Railroad Shellpot Branch | Wilmington | New Castle | 39°43′34″N 75°32′46″W |
| DE-28 | Odessa Bridge | Replaced | Center-bearing swing span | 1928 | 1997 | DE 299 (Main Street) | Appoquinimink River | Odessa | New Castle | 39°27′10″N 75°39′18″W |
| DE-29 | Wagamon Pond Dam and Bridge | Replaced | Reinforced concrete cast-in-place slab | 1917 | 1990 | Road 197 (Mulberry Street) | Broadkill River | Milton | Sussex | 38°46′38″N 75°18′46″W |
| DE-30 | Red Bridge | Replaced | Steel girder (concrete-encased) | 1916 | 1991 | DE 5 (Union Street) | Broadkill River | Milton | Sussex | 38°46′43″N 75°18′40″W |
| DE-31 | South Wilmington Causeway Bridge | Replaced | Reinforced concrete flat slab | 1940 | 1991 | US 13 Bus. (South Market Street) | Former Pennsylvania Railroad Shellpot Branch | Wilmington | New Castle | 39°43′28″N 75°33′21″W |
| DE-33 | Seaford Bridge | Rehabilitated | Simple trunnion bascule | 1925 | 1991 | Road 13 (North Front Street) | Nanticoke River | Seaford | Sussex | 38°38′25″N 75°36′33″W |
| DE-34 | State Highway Bridge No. 20 | Rehabilitated | Steel girder (concrete-encased) | 1932 | 1992 | Road 232 (Rockland Road) | Husbands Run | Rockland | New Castle | 39°47′10″N 75°33′42″W |
| DE-35 | State Highway Bridge No. 2 | Rehabilitated | Steel girder (concrete-encased) | 1933 | 1992 | Road 232 (Rockland Road) | Brandywine River | Rockland | New Castle | 39°47′49″N 75°34′30″W |
| DE-36 | Railroad Avenue Bridge | Replaced | Steel rolled stringer (concrete-encased) | 1903 | 1992 | Church Avenue | Mispillion River | Milford | Kent | 38°54′44″N 75°25′51″W |
| DE-37 | Thompson's Station Bridge | Rehabilitated | Warren truss | 1928 | 1993 | Road 329 (Chambers Rock Road) | White Clay Creek | Newark | New Castle | 39°43′58″N 75°45′35″W |
| DE-39 | Mill Creek Bridge | Replaced | Timber-concrete composite | 1936 | 1994 | DE 6 (Woodland Beach Road) | Mill Creek | Smyrna | Kent | 39°18′28″N 75°34′33″W |
| DE-40 | Delaware State Bridge No. 21A | Rehabilitated | Rolling lift (Scherzer) bascule | 1930 | 1995 | DE 1 (Rehoboth Boulevard) | Mispillion River | Milford | Kent | 38°55′02″N 75°25′04″W |
| DE-43 | Delaware Bridge No. 179A | Replaced | Warren truss | 1900 | 1995 | Road 285 (Evanson Road) | Mill Creek | Hockessin | New Castle | 39°46′58″N 75°42′06″W |
| DE-48 | State Bridge No. 424 | Replaced | Warren truss | 1884 | 1996 | Road 446 (Wiggins Mill Road) | Wiggins Mill Pond Outlet | Townsend | New Castle | 39°24′12″N 75°42′15″W |
| DE-51 | State Bridge No. 177 | Rehabilitated | Stone arch | 1846 | 1996 | Brackenville Road | Mill Creek | Hockessin | New Castle | 39°46′31″N 75°41′24″W |
| DE-52 | State Bridge No. 123A | Replaced | Timber stringer | 1933 | 1996 | Road 123 (Stratham Lane) | Kings Causeway Branch | Milford | Kent | 38°58′27″N 75°22′32″W |
| DE-53 | State Bridge No. 456 | Replaced | Timber stringer | 1934 | 1996 | Road 45 (Walker School Road) | Sawmill Branch of Smyrna River | Townsend | New Castle | 39°22′25″N 75°36′04″W |
| DE-54 | Carter's Bridge | Rehabilitated | Steel rolled stringer | 1909 | 1996 | Road 211 (Still Road) | Choptank River | Sandtown | Kent | 39°03′16″N 75°44′04″W |
