= Middle Run =

Middle Run may refer to one of the following:

- Middle Run, a creek in New Castle County, Delaware, east of downtown Newark, and a tributary of White Clay Creek
- Middle Run Valley Natural Area in New Castle County, named after the creek which runs through it
