= Wilmington Rail Viaduct =

- U.S. National Register of Historic Places
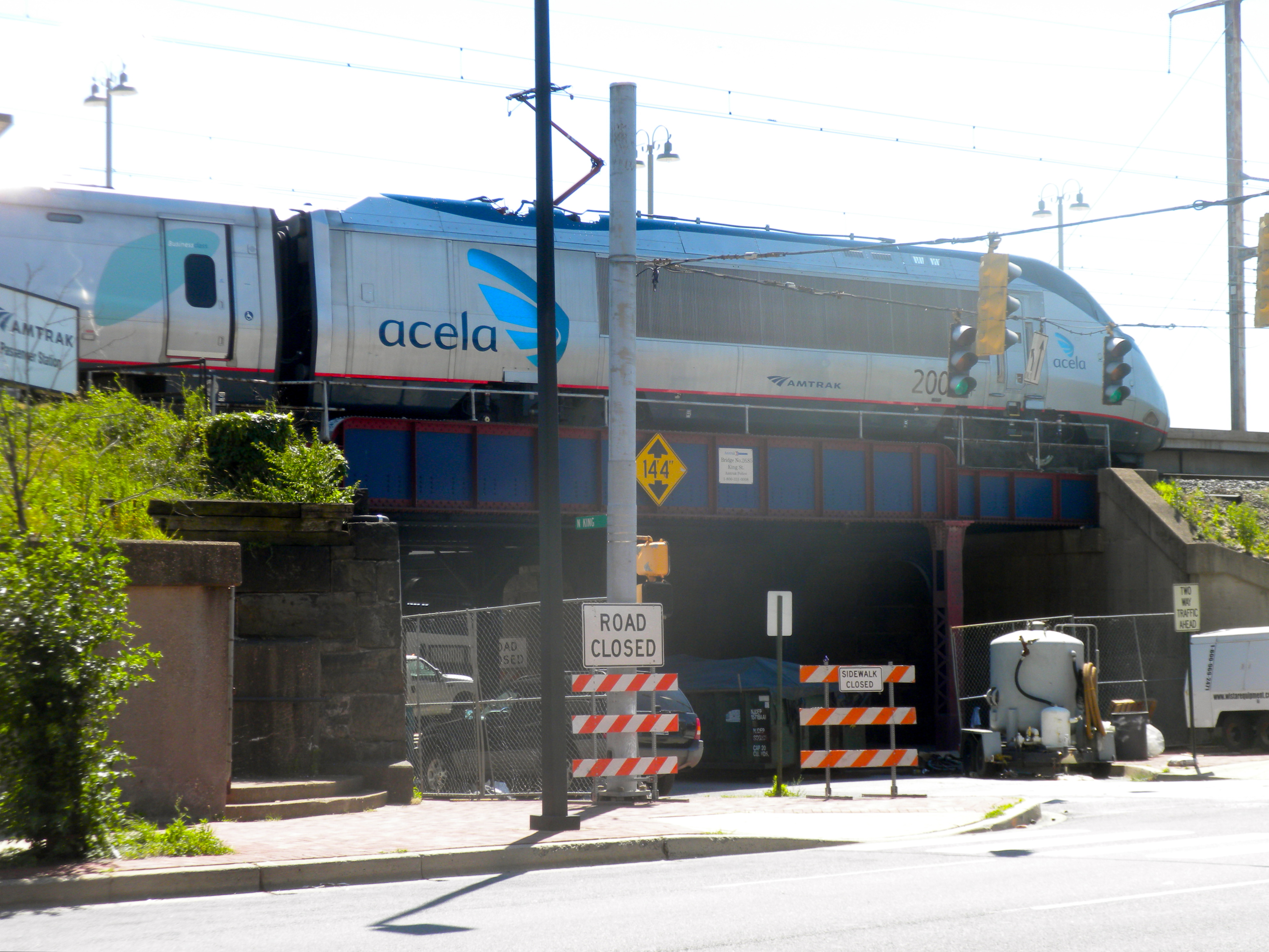
- Typical plate girder bridge and fill along the viaduct

- Location within Delaware Location within the United States
- Location: Amtrak's Northeast Corridor through Wilmington, Delaware
- Coordinates: 39.738122°N 75.561850°W
- Area: 11 acres (4.5 ha)
- Built: 1902
- Architectural style: through girder bridges
- NRHP reference No.: 99001276
- Added to NRHP: November 10, 1999

The Wilmington Rail Viaduct is a series of fills and bridges, about 4 miles (6.4 km) long, that carries the Northeast Corridor through the city of Wilmington, Delaware, above street level. Constructed between 1902 and 1908, the structure consists principally of fills supported by heavy stone retaining walls, punctuated with plate girder bridges over streets, and augmented by a few sections of brick arch viaduct. Its construction is typical of the Pennsylvania Railroad's architectural practices at the time, and the viaduct has been documented by the Historic American Engineering Record and listed on the National Register of Historic Places. Built by the Pennsylvania Railroad (PRR) as part of a series of grade crossing eliminations along the Northeast Corridor, the elevation of the rail line necessitated several other changes to rail infrastructure in Wilmington, including the construction of the Wilmington Shops at the east end of the viaduct, and the construction of the Wilmington Station and adjacent Pennsylvania Railroad Office Building along the elevated right-of-way.

== Physical description ==
The viaduct extends from Vandever Avenue, on its east end (a location on the railroad known as LANDLITH interlocking), across the Brandywine Creek and then roughly parallel to the Christina River through Wilmington Station. The west end of the viaduct is adjacent to the Alban Park neighborhood of Wilmington, an area also known as West Yard.

The bulk of the viaduct, from Vandever Avenue to Lower Linden Street, consists of earthen fill (derived from the construction excavation for the viaduct) held between heavy ashlar sandstone retaining walls resting on concrete foundations. Some of the northern sections of the viaduct have fill enclosed in timber cribbing on one side of the right-of-way, but generally the fill is contained with retaining walls on both sides. The ashlar also forms the abutments for the overpasses carrying the railroad tracks across city streets, which are steel plate through girder or deck girder bridges. The fill carries three tracks for much of its length; sidings, some now abandoned, descend to street level by ramps at various points. It was topped with 4 feet (1.2 m) of ballast before tracks were laid.

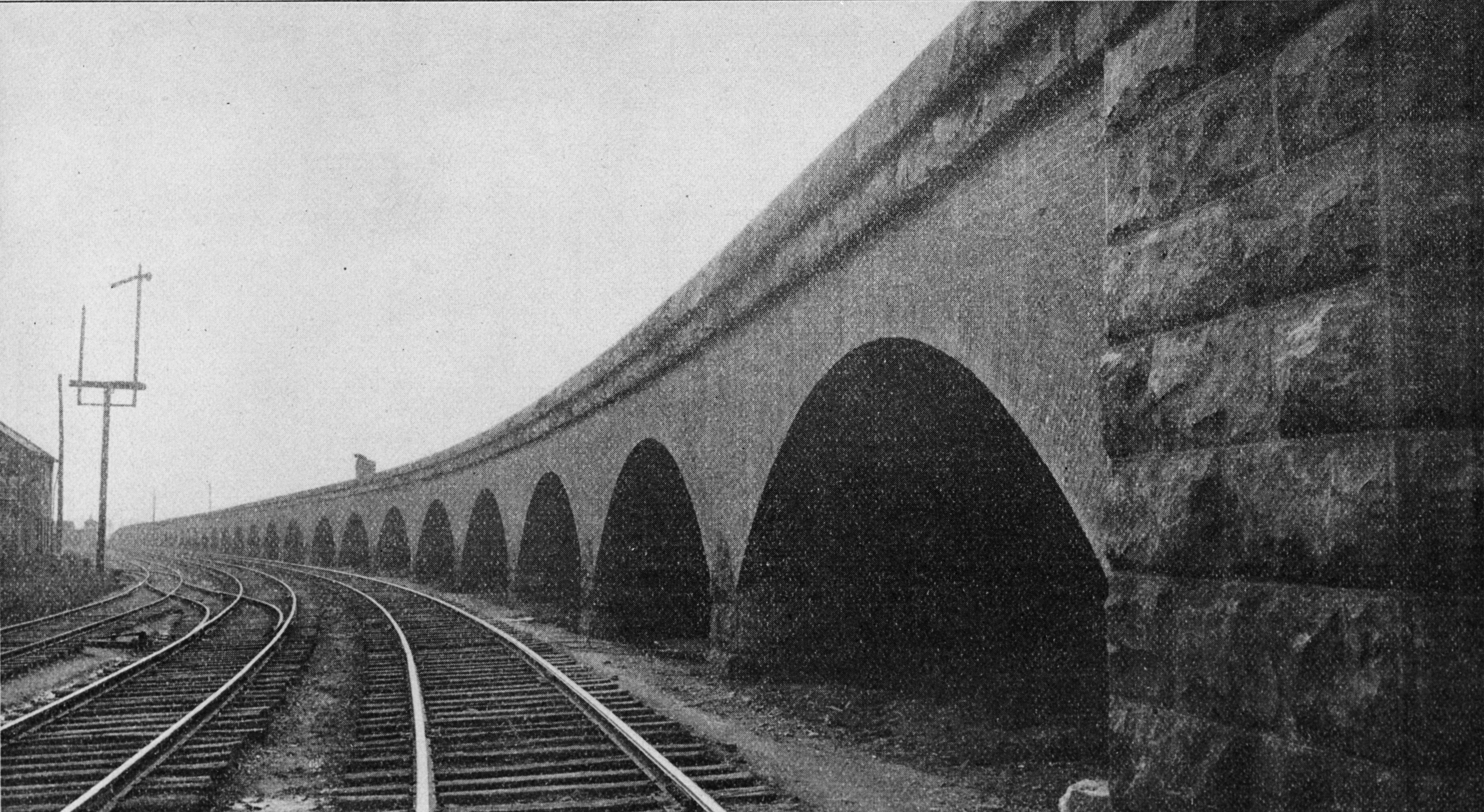
A section of the arch viaduct soon after its construction.

The west end of the viaduct, below Lower Linden Street, was constructed as an arched viaduct when the underlying soil was found to be too soft to support the fill carrying the remainder of the line. Originally designed in stone, shortages of sandstone led to the construction of the 41-foot (12 m) arches in brick, instead. Twelve arches carry the line from Lower Linden Street to the (stone) Beech Street underpass, and twenty arches continue southwest from Beech Street to the former Baltimore and Ohio and Wilmington and Northern underpass. The remainder of the structure to its West Yard end is again of retaining wall and fill construction.

The bridge over the Brandywine Creek near the east end of the viaduct had to be replaced to accommodate the newly elevated track level. At the time, this part of the Brandywine was considered navigable water, though rarely used, and the railroad had to construct a moveable bridge to accommodate navigation. The railroad chose to use a swing bridge, and began construction of the center pivot pier in the winter of 1903. The first caisson sunk there was damaged by ice and swept away in a flood. A new caisson was built resumed after the winter passed and a stone-faced concrete pier, 35 feet (11 m) in diameter, successfully constructed. A second pier was built in the stream to the southwest, leaving two 59-foot (18 m) channels between the pivot pier and the bank and the pivot and second piers. Icebreakers were built on either side of the pivot pier. (The tidal nature of the Brandywine required both sides of the bridge to be protected from ice.)

The superstructure of the bridge was manufactured by the Phoenix Bridge Company. It consists of a 78-foot (24 m) plate girder from the southwest bank to a fixed pier, and a 158-foot (48 m) fishbelly girder from that pier to the northeast bank, turning on the pivot pier. It carries three tracks. Two buildings were erected on the bridge, one for a watchman and the signal levers that protected and operated the bridge, and one to house the gasoline engine that turned it. The interlocking levers on the swing bridge were placed in service on March 4, 1906; this was the first electro-mechanical interlocking using small levers (rather than the rod-linked armstrong levers typical at the time) on the Pennsylvania Railroad system.

The structure has undergone relatively little modification since its construction. A 1920s electrification program to Wilmington added support structures to string catenary wires along the length of the viaduct. During the early 20th century, the swing bridge over the Brandywine was fixed in place and the engine and control buildings removed. In 1955, the construction of the Walnut Street Bridge required an undergrade bridge to be built to carry a new, wider alignment of Walnut Street slightly to the east of its original course. The new bridge is of plate girder construction over concrete abutments and piers. In 1983, Amtrak replaced the superstructure of the Poplar Street bridge and refurbished the piers and abutments.

== History ==
The rail line through Wilmington, originally constructed by the Philadelphia, Wilmington and Baltimore Railroad in 1837, came under the control of the Pennsylvania Railroad (PRR) when it bought a controlling interest in the PW&B in 1881. As the PRR digested its Gilded Age acquisitions, freight traffic on its lines boomed, increasing by 64% between 1897 and 1902 in the recovery following the Panic of 1893. Longer, heavier, and more frequent trains pushed the railroad's existing infrastructure to its limits; however, they also brought an enormous increase in earnings. During the beginning of the 20th century, the PRR invested a portion of these profits in improving its rights-of-way and expanding capacity throughout its system.

An important component of these improvements was grade crossing elimination. In many of the cities served by PRR lines, the railroad tracks ran at ground level, crossing the streets at grade. As train speeds increased and traffic swelled, preventing grade crossing accidents became increasingly difficult. In Wilmington, the PRR had already built the Shellpot Branch in 1888 to divert through freight traffic through the sparsely developed marshes to the south of the city. However, many industries along the Christina waterfront still required local freight service, and congestion in the city streets remained a serious problem.

In February 1901, the PRR's Annual Report announced the railroad's intention to make extensive improvements to its line between Philadelphia and Washington, DC. In Wilmington, the planned improvements included the double-tracking of the Shellpot Branch, the elevation of the main line through the city, and the construction of a new station along the elevated main line. The railroad's shops were also to be moved from 3rd and Church Streets to Todd's Cut, to the east of the city near Edgemoor. This would allow ample room to expand the shops, and would make room for a realignment of the main line to reduce curvature and increase train speeds.

The original plan for the viaduct called for a double-track structure, enclosed between two stone walls 12 and 14 feet (3.7 and 4.3 m) high, which would largely follow the previous alignment of the main line. The choice of stonework reflected prevailing practice on the PRR and its rival, the New York Central. The choice of stone, in preference to steel bridges, reflected engineering conservatism on the part of the railroads, and also associated the railroad structures with a sense of permanency and a monumental aesthetic. The PRR's Chief Engineer, William H. Brown, was particularly known for his advocacy of stone construction, and it was under his direction that the railroad's engineering department drew up the plans for the viaduct.

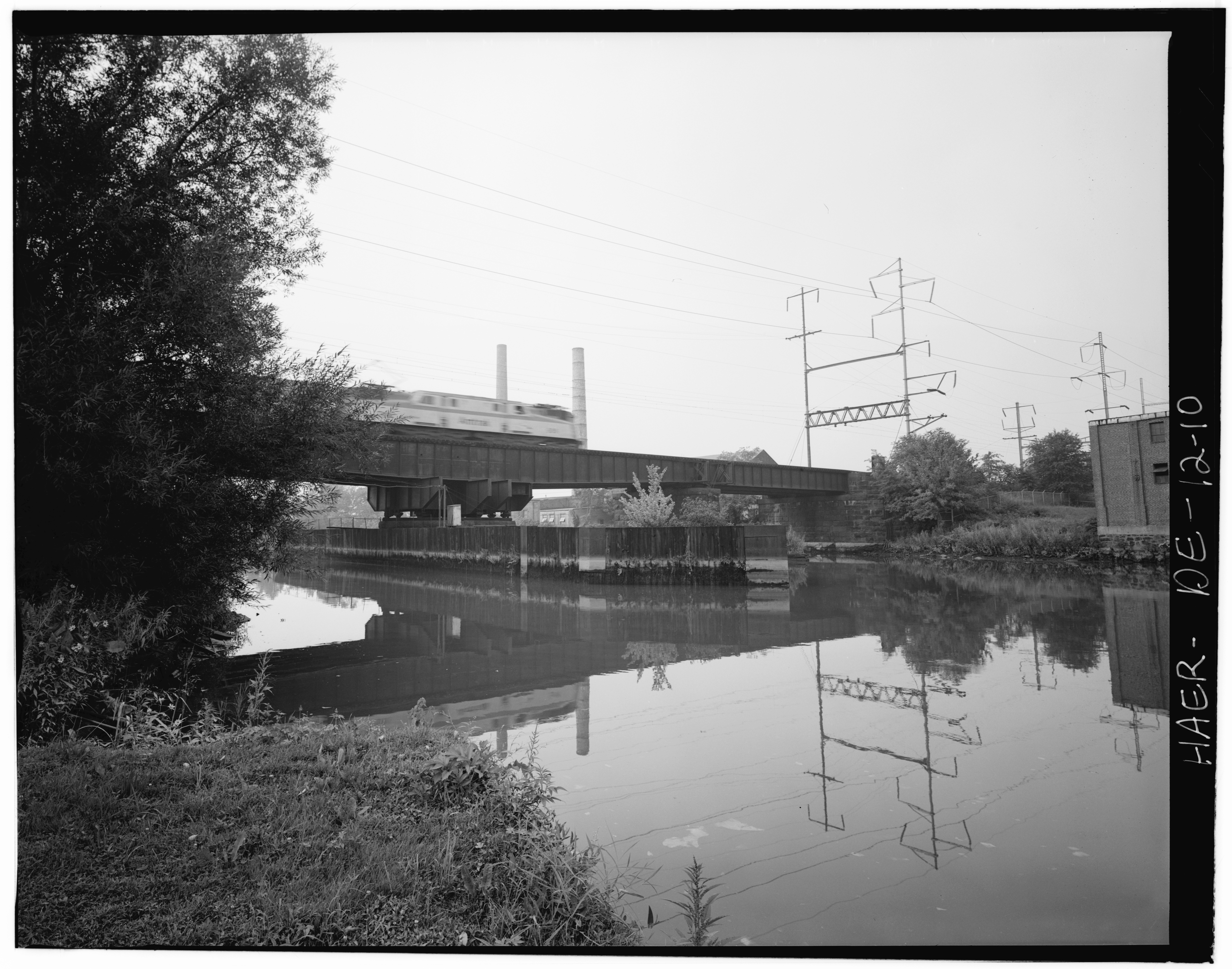
An Amtrak train pulled by a GG1 crosses the Brandywine River swing bridge.

City streets were to be crossed by iron bridges, minimizing roadwork. The railroad originally planned to build iron bridgework to connect old and new segments of the main line during construction to minimize service disruptions. However, it was not required, because service was able to continue on the old main line without interruption. Plans also had to be altered in the West Yard area, where marshy ground dictated the construction of an arched viaduct rather than a fill. Construction commenced in the spring of 1902, starting in the area around Wilmington station and working outwards. Simultaneously, construction began from LANDLITH toward the Brandywine. The original completion date of mid-1905 was not met, in part due to a general retrenchment which temporarily stopped the work, apart from the Brandywine Creek bridge, on March 1, 1904. The southbound tracks were placed in service from the new Wilmington Shops south across the Brandywine to 5th Street on August 25, and on September 24, construction work resumed to add a third track from the Brandywine to the shops. The new swing bridge over the Brandywine was opened on March 1, 1906, and the southbound tracks were opened over the length of the viaduct on January 28, 1907. The northbound tracks were opened on March 16; however, the side of the new Wilmington station serving those tracks did not go into service until July 7, 1908.

As early as 1918, the PRR had begun electrifying some of its lines radiating from Philadelphia to replace steam trains with double-ended multiple unit cars to ease congestion at its terminal. Extension of the electrification program to Wilmington was announced on March 25, 1926, and electrified local service opened on September 30, 1928.

The PRR continued to operate service over the viaduct until its 1968 merger with the New York Central Railroad to form the Penn Central Transportation Company. After the bankruptcy of Penn Central in 1976, the viaduct, with the rest of the Northeast Corridor, was transferred to Amtrak, which currently maintains and operates it.

Construction of the viaduct had a significant effect on the development of Wilmington. In addition to emphasizing the stability and importance of the PRR, the elevated fill both visually and spatially separated the Christina River waterfront from the rest of the city north of Front Street. It served to both maintain and screen the heavy industries that grew up along the waterfront during the 20th century. With the passing of these industries and the redevelopment of the Wilmington waterfront, the viaduct now forms one boundary of the city's riverfront district.

== See also ==
- List of bridges documented by the Historic American Engineering Record in Delaware
