= Bogy Run =

Bogy Run Tributary to White Clay Creek
- Location within Delaware Location within the United States

Location
- Country: United States
- State: Delaware
- County: New Castle
- City: Newark

Physical characteristics
- Source: Christina River divide
  - location: Newark, Delaware
  - coordinates: 39°41′38″N 075°45′51″W
  - elevation: 155 ft (47 m)
- Mouth: White Clay Creek
  - location: Newark, Delaware
  - coordinates: 39°41′33″N 075°45′51″W
  - elevation: 72 ft (22 m)
- Length: 1.16 mi (1.87 km)
- Basin size: 0.63 square miles (1.6 km^{2})
- Discharge
  - average: 0.63 cu ft/s (0.018 m^{3}/s) at mouth with White Clay Creek

Basin features
- Progression: White Clay Creek → Christina River → Delaware River → Delaware Bay → Atlantic Ocean
- River system: Christina River
- Tributaries
  - left: unnamed tributaries
  - right: unnamed tributaries
- Bridges: Country Club Drive, New London Road (DE 896), North College Avenue

Bogy Run is a 1.16 mi (1.87 km) long 1st order tributary to White Clay Creek in New Castle County, Delaware.

== Variant names ==
According to the Geographic Names Information System, it has also been known historically as:

- Boogy Run

== Course ==
Bogy Run rises on the Christina River divide in Newark in New Castle County, Delaware. Bogy Run then flows southeast and then turns northeast to meet White Clay Creek at Newark, Delaware.

== Watershed ==
Bogy Run drains 0.63 square miles (1.6 km^{2}) of area, receives about 46.0 in/year of precipitation, has a topographic wetness index of 430.04 and is about 10.8% forested.

== See also ==
- List of rivers of Delaware
