= St. James Episcopal Church, Mill Creek =

Historic church in Delaware, United States

- St. James Church
- U.S. National Register of Historic Places
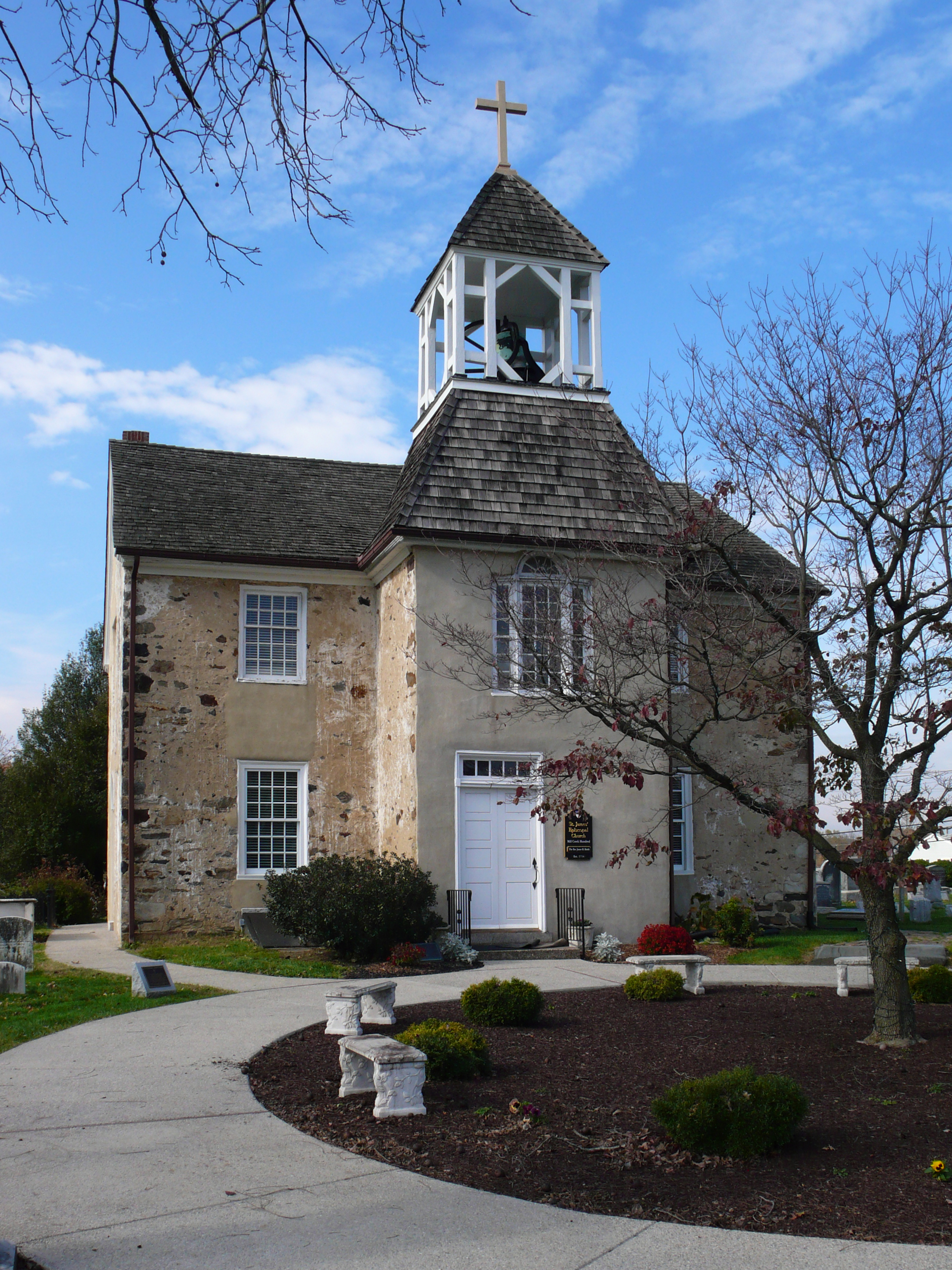
- St. James Church, November 2012

- Location within Delaware Location within the United States
- Location: 2106 St. James Church Road, near Stanton Mill Creek Hundred
- Coordinates: 39.71860°N 75.66064°W
- Area: 10 acres (4.0 ha)
- Built: 1820–1823
- NRHP reference No.: 73000543
- Added to NRHP: May 8, 1973

St. James Episcopal Church, Mill Creek, also known as St. James Church or St. James Church, Stanton, is an historic Episcopal church located at 2106 St. James Church Road, in Stanton, Mill Creek Hundred, New Castle County near Wilmington, Delaware.

The church reported 401 members in 2015 and 341 members in 2023; no membership statistics were reported in 2024 parochial reports. Plate and pledge income reported for the congregation in 2024 was $177,315 with average Sunday attendance (ASA) of 53 persons. This was a relative decrease from ASA of 87 reported in 2016.

== History ==
As Europeans settled in Delaware, a log structure was erected near this location circa 1703. Mill Creek Hundred was split off from Christiana Hundred (as were nearby White Clay Hundred and Pencader Hundred) in 1710, and four years later James Robinson bought 110 acres, of which he donated 10 to build a church for the community. The building was finished two years later, and the first minister was George Ross, who later became father-in-law of the flagmaker Betsy Ross. After the American Revolution, although few Anglican clergy remained in Delaware, a layman from this church attended the first General Convention that founded the Episcopal Church, along with Rev. Charles Henry Wharton (a converted Catholic and rector of nearby Immanuel Church, New Castle) and two other layman from that parish. In 1820, the wood-frame church burned, and was rebuilt in stone during the next three years.

Bishop William White consecrated the current church in 1821, and it was added to the National Register of Historic Places as St. James Church in 1973. A rounded apsidal chancel projects from the north wall, and the interior still has white box pews and a balcony on three sides. The oldest burial in the surrounding cemetery is of John Armstrong, who died in 1726. The cemetery also contains the graves of several identified veterans of the American Revolution (and a memorial concerning lost veterans' graves).

== See also ==
List of Registered Historic Places in New Castle County, Delaware
