= Egypt Run (Pennsylvania) =

Location
- Country: United States
- State: Pennsylvania
- County: Chester

Physical characteristics
- Source
  - location: New Garden Township, Chester County, Pennsylvania
- Mouth: White Clay Creek
  - location: London Britain Township, Chester County, Pennsylvania
  - coordinates: 39.7919°N 75.7709°W

Basin features
- Progression: Egypt Run → White Clay Creek → Christina River → Delaware River → Delaware Bay → Atlantic Ocean
- River system: White Clay Creek

Egypt Run is a small tributary of the White Clay Creek in Chester County, Pennsylvania, United States. The stream flows through rural and semi-suburban areas of southern Chester County, draining portions of New Garden Township and London Britain Township before joining White Clay Creek.

The headwaters of Egypt Run are located near the Pennsylvania–Delaware border. The stream flows generally northward through agricultural land, wooded areas, and low-density residential development before reaching its confluence with White Clay Creek in London Britain Township.

Egypt Run is part of the greater White Clay Creek watershed, which has been designated as a component of the National Wild and Scenic River system due to its ecological, scenic, and historical significance. While Egypt Run itself is not individually designated, it contributes to the hydrology and water quality of the protected watershed.

== See also ==
- List of rivers of Pennsylvania
