= Hershey Run =

River in Delaware, United States

Coordinates: 39°42′56″N 75°37′32″W

Hershey Run is a 2.9-mile-long (4.7 km) stream located in New Castle County, Delaware. It is a tributary of White Clay Creek.

It rises on the edge of the Belvedere subdivision on the outskirts of Newport, Delaware and flows southward along the western edge of that town. To the west of the run lies Bread and Cheese Island, cut off by a partly filled back channel between Hershey Run and Red Clay Creek. New Castle County's Pleasant Hills Park lies along the run in the vicinity of the junction with the back channel. At the southern end of the park, the run enters a tidal marsh which extends to its mouth, near the end of the White Clay.

The nearby Koppers railroad tie treatment plant heavily contaminated the run with creosote.

== See also ==
- List of rivers of Delaware
