= Clyde Farm Site =

Archaeological site in Delaware, United States

- U.S. National Register of Historic Places
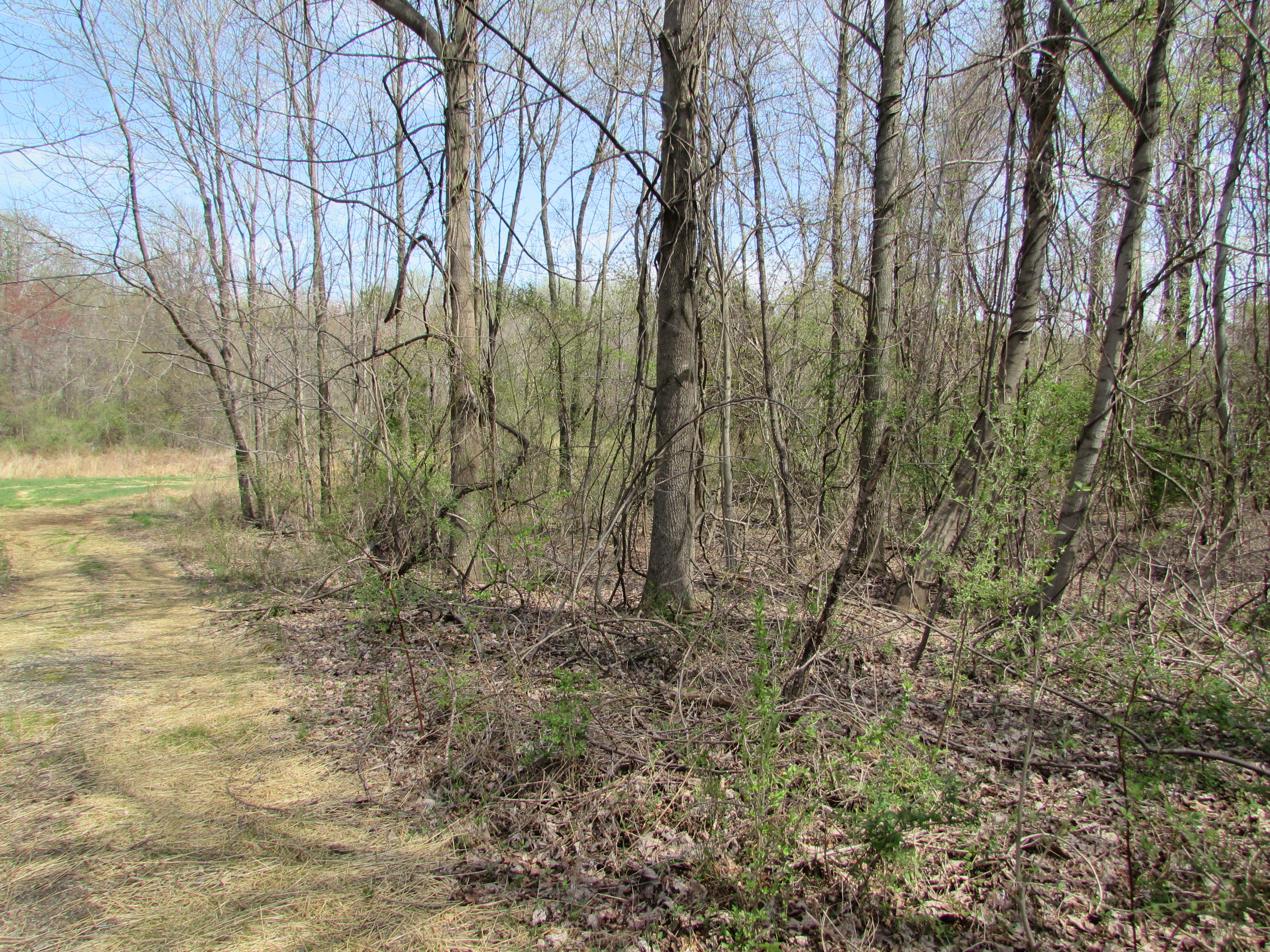
- Picture taken in the general vicinity of the Clyde Farm site.
- Nearest city: Stanton, Delaware
- NRHP reference No.: 77000391
- Added to NRHP: July 29, 1977

The Clyde Farm Site (7NC-E-6) is a prehistoric archaeological site in rural New Castle County, Delaware, United States. Its main features are remnants of a pit-house, storage area, and hearth, dating to c. 1000 BCE. Another area where stone tools were produced was also identified during excavations in 1984. The site has been known and of amateur and professional archaeological interest since at least the 1930s. It is located near the waterway's fall line and an estuarine area.

The site was listed on the National Register of Historic Places in 1977.

== See also ==
- National Register of Historic Places listings in northern New Castle County, Delaware
