= Pike Creek (White Clay Creek tributary) =

Creek tributary for White Clay Creek

Pike Creek Tributary to White Clay Creek
- Location within Delaware Location within the United States

Location
- Country: United States
- State: Delaware
- County: New Castle

Physical characteristics
- Source: White Clay Creek divide
  - location: Pond at Stirrup Farms, Delaware
  - coordinates: 39°46′23″N 075°43′38″W
  - elevation: 300 ft (91 m)
- Mouth: White Clay Creek
  - location: Choate, Delaware
  - coordinates: 39°41′57″N 075°41′30″W
  - elevation: 18 ft (5.5 m)
- Length: 5.37 mi (8.64 km)
- Basin size: 6.64 square miles (17.2 km^{2})
- Discharge
  - average: 9.41 cu ft/s (0.266 m^{3}/s) at mouth with White Clay Creek

Basin features
- Progression: White Clay Creek → Christina River → Delaware River → Delaware Bay → Atlantic Ocean
- River system: Christina River
- Tributaries
  - left: unnamed tributaries
  - right: unnamed tributaries
- Bridges: DE 72, New Linden Hill Road, Pike Creek Road, Upper Pike Creek Road, DE 2, W Green Valley Road

National Wild and Scenic Rivers System
- Designated: October 24, 2000

Pike Creek is a 5.37 mi (8.64 km) long 2nd order tributary to White Clay Creek in New Castle County, Delaware.

== Course ==
Pike Creek rises on the White Clay Creek divide at Stirrup Farms, Delaware in New Castle County, Delaware. Pike Creek then flows south-southeast to meet White Clay Creek at Choate, Delaware.

== Watershed ==
Pike Creek drains 6.64 square miles (17.2 km^{2}) of area, receives about 46.2 in/year of precipitation, has a topographic wetness index of 398.22 and is about 24.6% forested.

== See also ==
- List of rivers of Delaware
