= Broad Run (White Clay Creek tributary) =

Location
- Country: United States
- State: Pennsylvania
- County: Chester

Physical characteristics
- Source
  - location: New Garden Township, Chester County, Pennsylvania
  - coordinates: 39°47′53″N 75°44′11″W
- Mouth: East Branch White Clay Creek
  - location: London Britain Township, Chester County, Pennsylvania
  - coordinates: 39°45′57″N 75°45′52″W

Basin features
- Tributaries
  - right: Walnut Run

National Wild and Scenic Rivers System
- Designated: October 24, 2000

Broad Run is a 4.3-mile-long (6.9 km) tributary of White Clay Creek located principally in New Garden Township, Chester County, Pennsylvania, in the United States.

The headwaters of Broad Run are in Kaolin, just south of Pennsylvania Route 41. Flowing southward, the stream enters a wide, deep valley. Between two hills east of Landenberg, Broad Run has been dammed to form Somerset Lake, the center of a development. Just south of the dam is the site of the Wilmington and Western Railroad's Broad Run Trestle, removed when the line to Landenberg was abandoned around 1940. Below, the valley narrows between hills again, and Broad Run enters London Britain Township and the White Clay Creek Preserve just before receiving Walnut Run. It empties into the White Clay about an eighth of a mile below.

Broad Run is included in the designation of the White Clay Creek as a Wild and Scenic River.

== Tributaries ==
- Walnut Run

== See also ==
- List of rivers of Pennsylvania
