= Mill Creek Hundred =

Unincorporated area in Delaware, US

Mill Creek Hundred is an unincorporated subdivision of New Castle County, Delaware. Hundreds were once used as a basis for representation in the Delaware General Assembly, and while their names still appear on all real estate transactions, they presently have no meaningful use or purpose except as a geographical point of reference.

== Boundaries and formation ==
Mill Creek Hundred is that portion of New Castle County that lies north and east of White Clay Creek and west of Red Clay Creek. Its western boundary follows a portion of the 12 mile arc drawn around the town of New Castle. It was formed from Christiana Hundred in 1710 and was named for Mill Creek that flows through its center.

== Development ==
Excepting large areas along Red Clay Creek and White Clay Creek preserved in parks or large estates, this area is now mostly suburban with extensive commercial and residential development. The southern portion was developed in the mid-twentieth century, with the northern portion developed more in the later decades. A portion of the city of Newark, the Hockessin, North Star, and Pike Creek Census Designated Places (CDP) and the communities of Marshallton, Milltown and Stanton are in Mill Creek Hundred.

== Geography ==
Important geographical features, in addition to Red Clay Creek, White Clay Creek and Mill Creek, include Pike Creek, Muddy Run, and Turkey Run. It is mostly in the piedmont region, but the southern portion is below the eastern Fall Line and on the coastal plain.

== Transportation ==
Important roads include portions of the Kirkwood Highway (Delaware Route 2), the Old Capital Trail, Lancaster Pike (Delaware Route 48), Newport-Gap Pike (Delaware Route 41), the Old Wilmington Road, Limestone Road (Delaware Route 7), Paper Mill Road (Delaware Route 72), and the old main highway between Wilmington and Baltimore, now Newport-Stanton Pike and Christiana-Stanton Road (Delaware Route 7). A portion of the old Baltimore and Ohio Railroad, now CSX Transportation's Philadelphia Subdivision crosses through Stanton, the Wilmington and Western Railroad runs along Red Clay Creek to Hockessin, and the Pomeroy and Newark Railroad once ran along White Clay Creek.
