= Marshallton United Methodist Church =

Historic church in Delaware, United States

- U.S. National Register of Historic Places
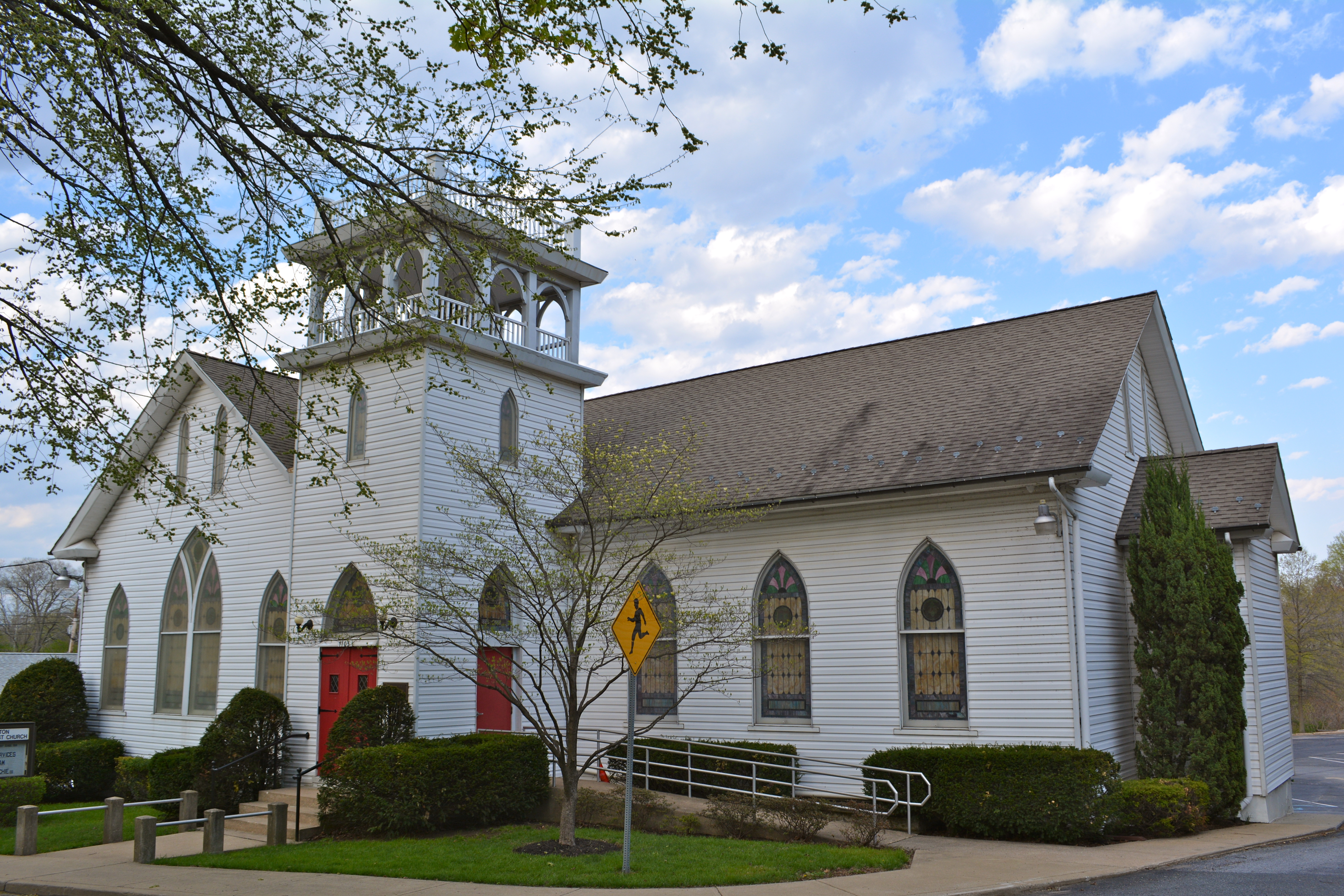

- Location within Delaware Location within the United States
- Location: 1105 Stanton Rd., Marshallton, Delaware
- Coordinates: 39°43′36″N 75°38′19″W
- Area: 1.3 acres (0.53 ha)
- Built: 1886, 1922
- Architectural style: Country Gothic
- NRHP reference No.: 86002945
- Added to NRHP: February 18, 1987

Marshallton United Methodist Church is a historic United Methodist church located at 1105 Stanton Road in Marshallton, New Castle County, Delaware. The original portion was built in 1886 as a one-room, 30-foot by 50-foot center-aisle plan frame structure with a gable roof. It sits on a foundation of "Brandywine Granite", a commonly found local building stone. In 1922, a 30-foot by 45-foot gabled frame addition was added on the east side of the original building. At the same time, Gothic arched commemorative stained glass windows and a bell tower were added. A three-story brick educational building and fellowship hall were added between 1949 and 1957.

It was added to the National Register of Historic Places in 1986.
