= Hickman Blacksmith Shop and House =

Historic buildings in Delaware, United States

- U.S. National Register of Historic Places
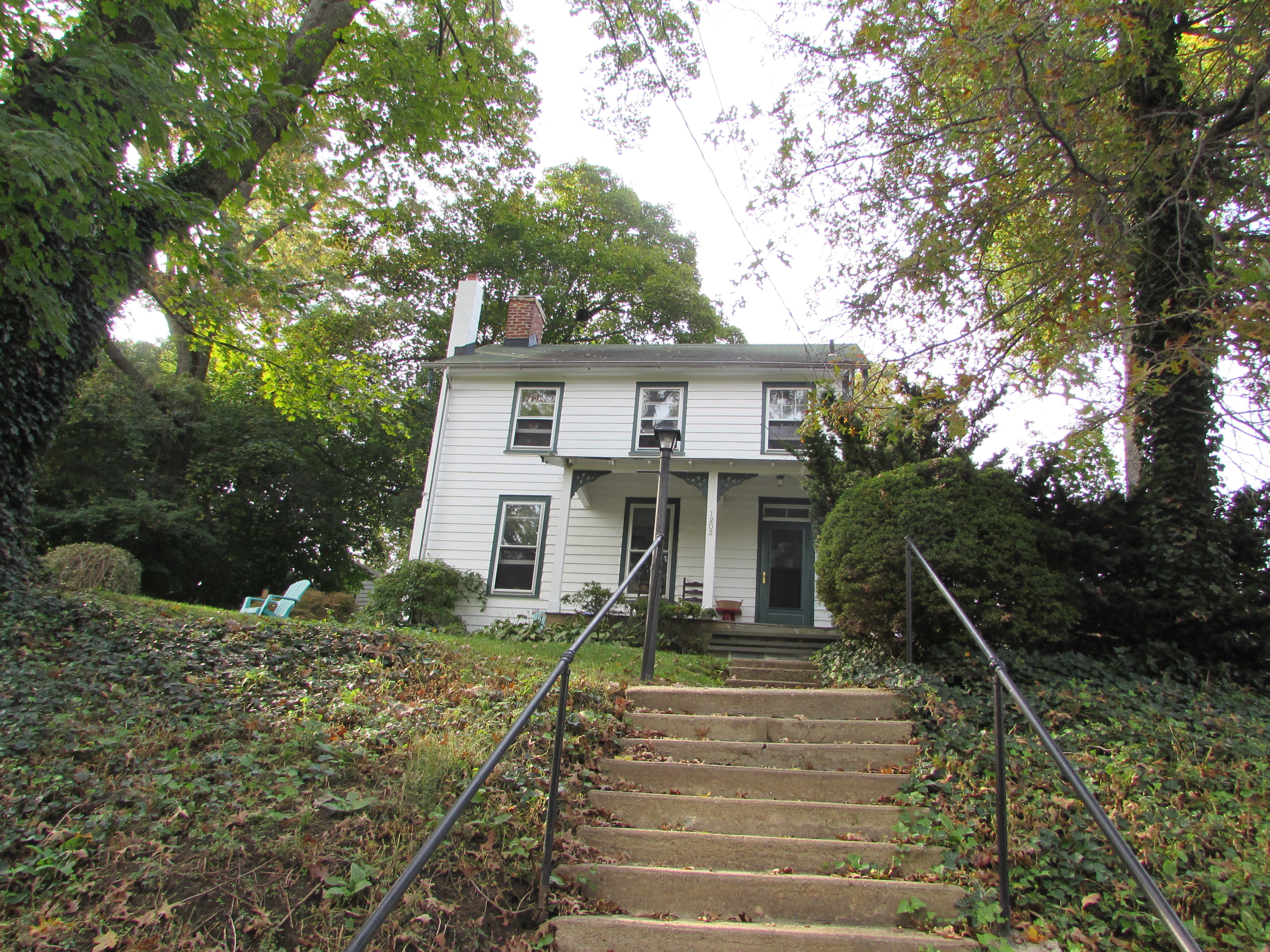
- The front of the Hickman House, flanked by large sugar maples

- Location within Delaware Location within the United States
- Location: 1201 and 1203 Greenbank Rd., Marshallton, Delaware
- Coordinates: 39°43′44″N 75°38′18″W
- Area: 0.7 acres (0.28 ha)
- Built: 1899
- Architectural style: Side-Passage w/ Stick Trim
- NRHP reference No.: 94001078
- Added to NRHP: September 2, 1994

Hickman Blacksmith Shop and House, also known as the Chas. C. Connell Roofing, Gutter, and Siding Co. and Jeffrey and Pamella Seemans House, is a historic home and blacksmith shop located at Marshallton, Delaware, United States. The shop was built about 1899, and is a rectangular, frame, 1 1/2-story building on a high stone foundation. The house was built about 1860, and is a side-passage plan, frame, 2-story dwelling on a stone foundation, with Stick trim and modest interior finish.

It was added to the National Register of Historic Places in 1994.
