= Hale-Byrnes House =

Historic house in Delaware, US

- U.S. National Register of Historic Places
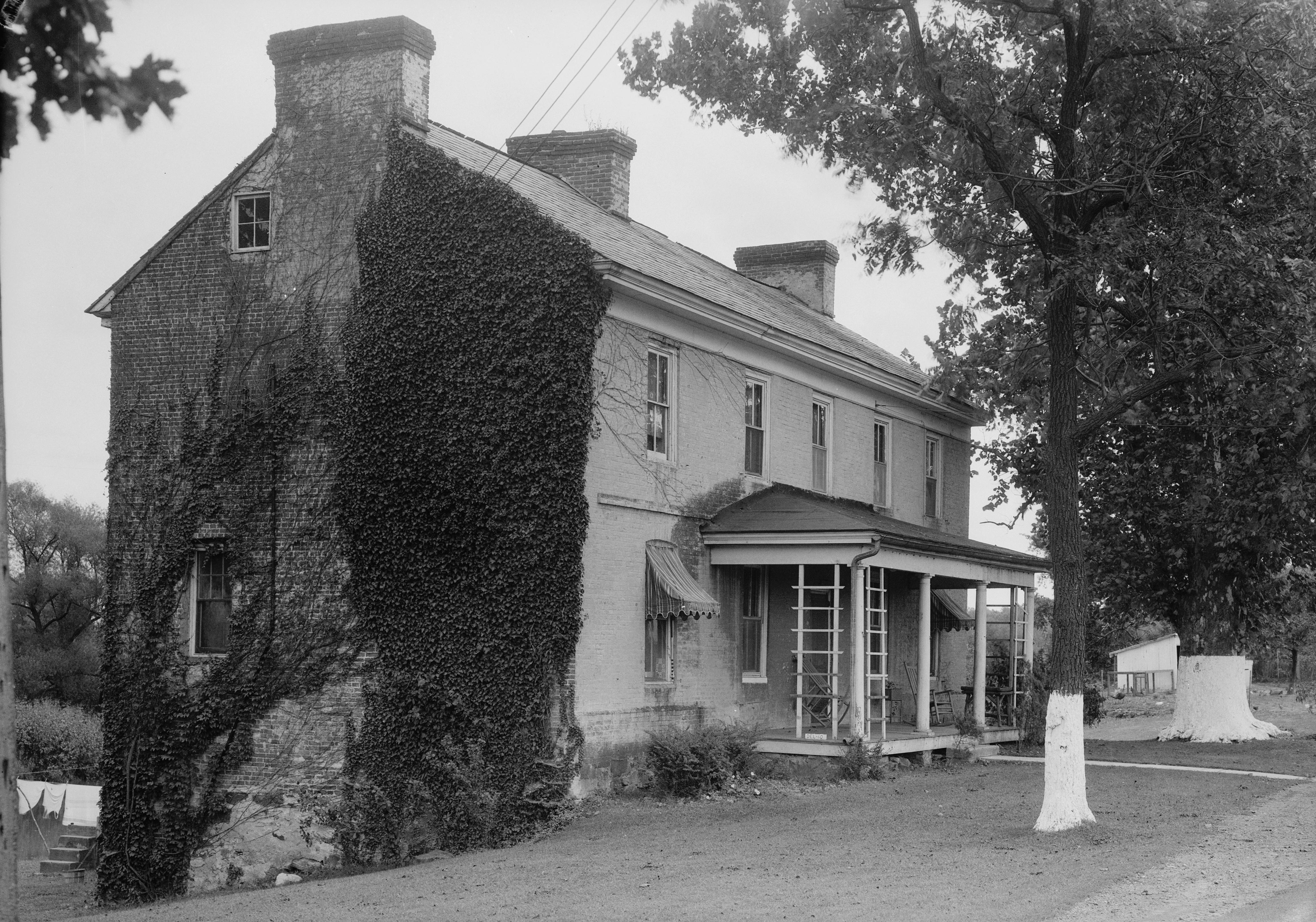
- Hale-Byrnes House, HABS Photo, c. 1937

- Location within Delaware Location within the United States
- Location: 606 Stanton-Christiana Road, Stanton, Delaware
- Coordinates: 39.701334°N 75.650541°W
- Area: 1 acre (0.40 ha)
- Built: 1750
- NRHP reference No.: 72000290
- Added to NRHP: June 2, 1972

The Hale-Byrnes House is a historic home located at 606 Stanton-Christiana Road in Stanton, Delaware, United States. It was built in 1750, and is a two-story, five bay brick dwelling. The house was built by Samuel Hale, who sold it to Daniel Byrnes in 1754. The house gained historic stature after the Battle of Cooch's Bridge, the only Revolutionary War battle in Delaware. After the skirmish General George Washington held a council at the house on September 6, 1777. The house is also the location of the 300-year-old George Washington Witness Tree of Delaware.

The site is listed on the National Register of Historic Places.

The house is open to the public on the first Wednesday of each month from 12 to 3 PM, and at other times by appointment. The house is also available for rental.

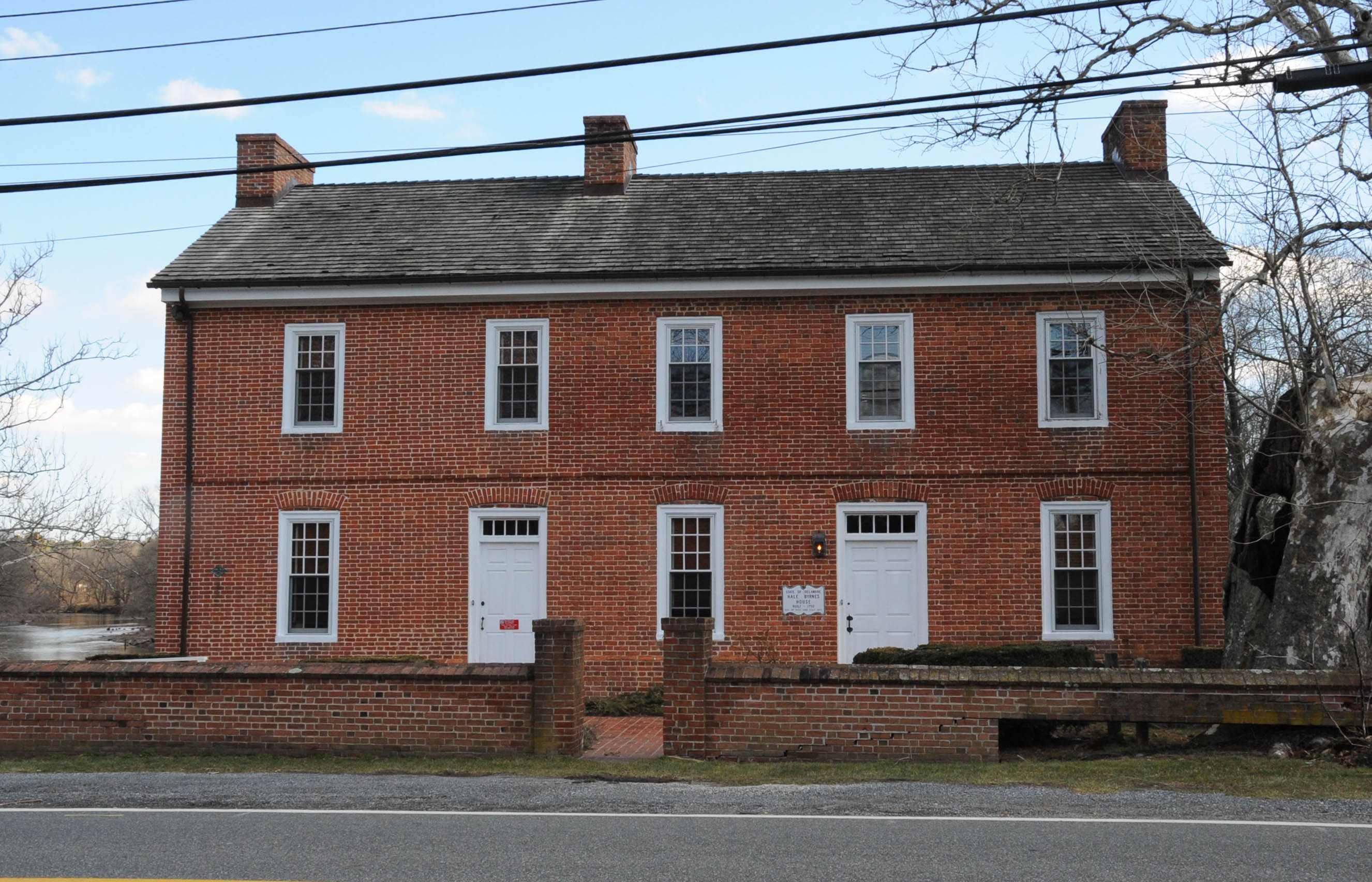
House in 2016

== See also ==
- List of Washington's Headquarters during the Revolutionary War
