= Middle Run (White Clay Creek tributary) =

Middle Run Tributary to White Clay Creek
- Location within Delaware Location within the United States

Location
- Country: United States
- State: Delaware
- County: New Castle

Physical characteristics
- Source: White Clay Creek divide
  - location: Estates at Corner Ketch, Delaware
  - coordinates: 39°44′45″N 075°44′23″W
  - elevation: 300 ft (91 m)
- Mouth: White Clay Creek
  - location: Delaplane Manor, Delaware
  - coordinates: 39°41′36″N 075°43′11″W
  - elevation: 46 ft (14 m)
- Length: 4.28 mi (6.89 km)
- Basin size: 3.92 square miles (10.2 km^{2})
- Discharge
  - average: 5.48 cu ft/s (0.155 m^{3}/s) at mouth with White Clay Creek

Basin features
- Progression: White Clay Creek → Christina River → Delaware River → Delaware Bay → Atlantic Ocean
- River system: Christina River
- Tributaries
  - left: unnamed tributaries
  - right: unnamed tributaries
- Bridges: DE 72, Foxden Road, Old Possum Park Road, Possum Park Road, DE 2

National Wild and Scenic Rivers System
- Designated: October 24, 2000

Middle Run is a 4.28 mi (6.89 km) long 2nd order tributary to White Clay Creek in New Castle County, Delaware, United States.

== Variant names ==
According to the Geographic Names Information System, it has also been known historically as:

- Muddy Run

== Course ==
Middle Run rises on the White Clay Creek divide at the Estates at Corner Ketch in New Castle County, Delaware. Middle Run then flows south to meet White Clay Creek at Delaplane, Delaware.

== Watershed ==
Middle Run drains 3.92 square miles (10.2 km^{2}) of area, receives about 46.1 in/year of precipitation, has a topographic wetness index of 401.04 and is about 32.8% forested.

== See also ==
- List of rivers of Delaware
