= Springer-Cranston House =

Historic house in Delaware, United States

- U.S. National Register of Historic Places
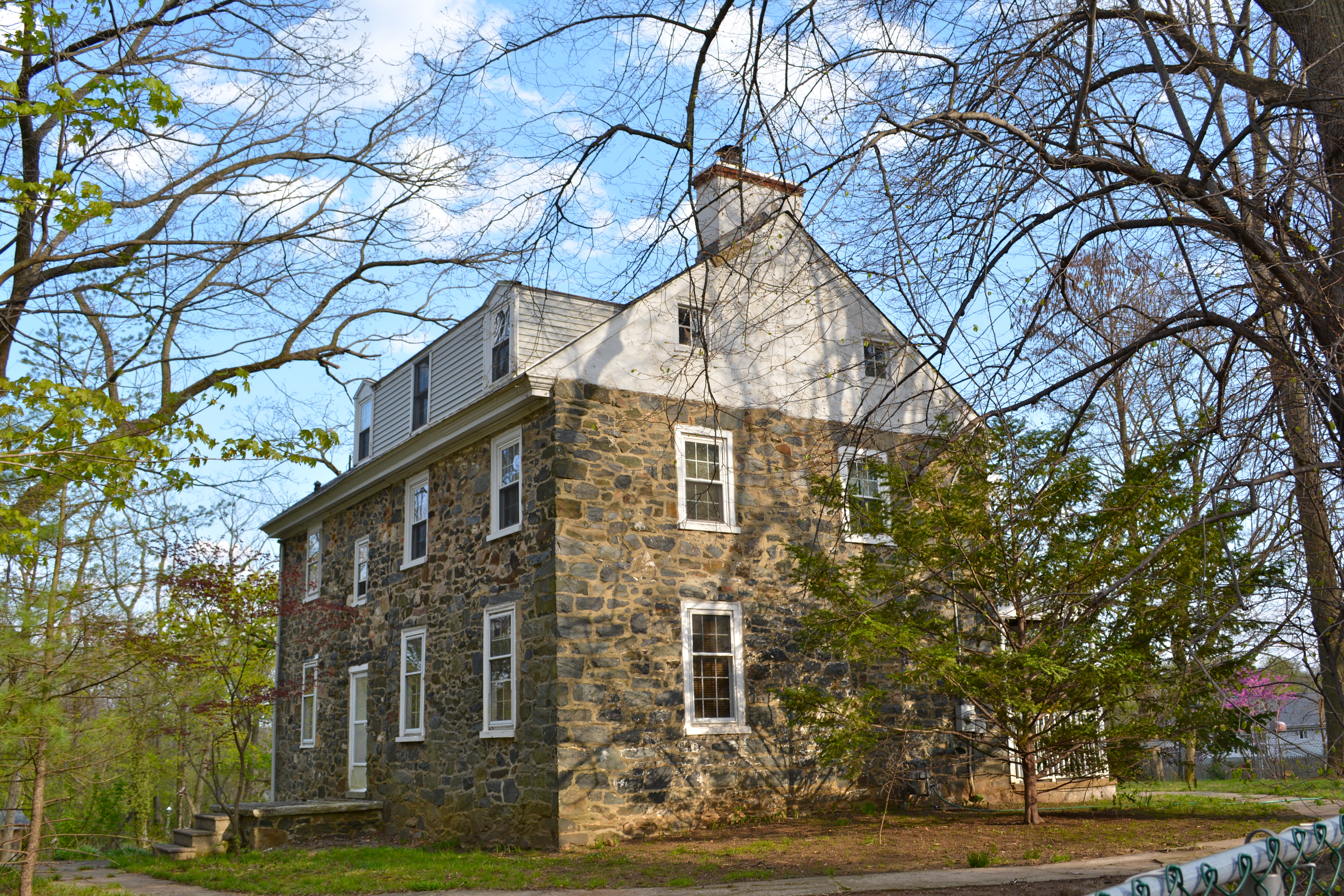
- View from the northwest

- Location within Delaware Location within the United States
- Location: 1015 Stanton Rd., Mill Creek Hundred, Marshallton, Delaware
- Coordinates: 39.72592°N 75.63836°W
- Area: 6 acres (2.4 ha)
- Architectural style: Vernacular Georgian
- NRHP reference No.: 94001177
- Added to NRHP: September 30, 1994

Springer-Cranston House is a historic home located at Marshallton in New Castle County, Delaware, United States. It was built in the late-18th century, and is a 2 1/2-story, four-bay, coursed rubble stone dwelling with a two-story stuccoed stone service wing. It has a Georgian interior floor plan and gable roof. The house is constructed of local Brandywine granite. It was originally a one-story, stone dwelling roughly 24 feet by 18 feet, and subsequently enlarged and modified during the first half of the 19th century. The interior was modernized in the 1940s.

It was added to the National Register of Historic Places in 1994.

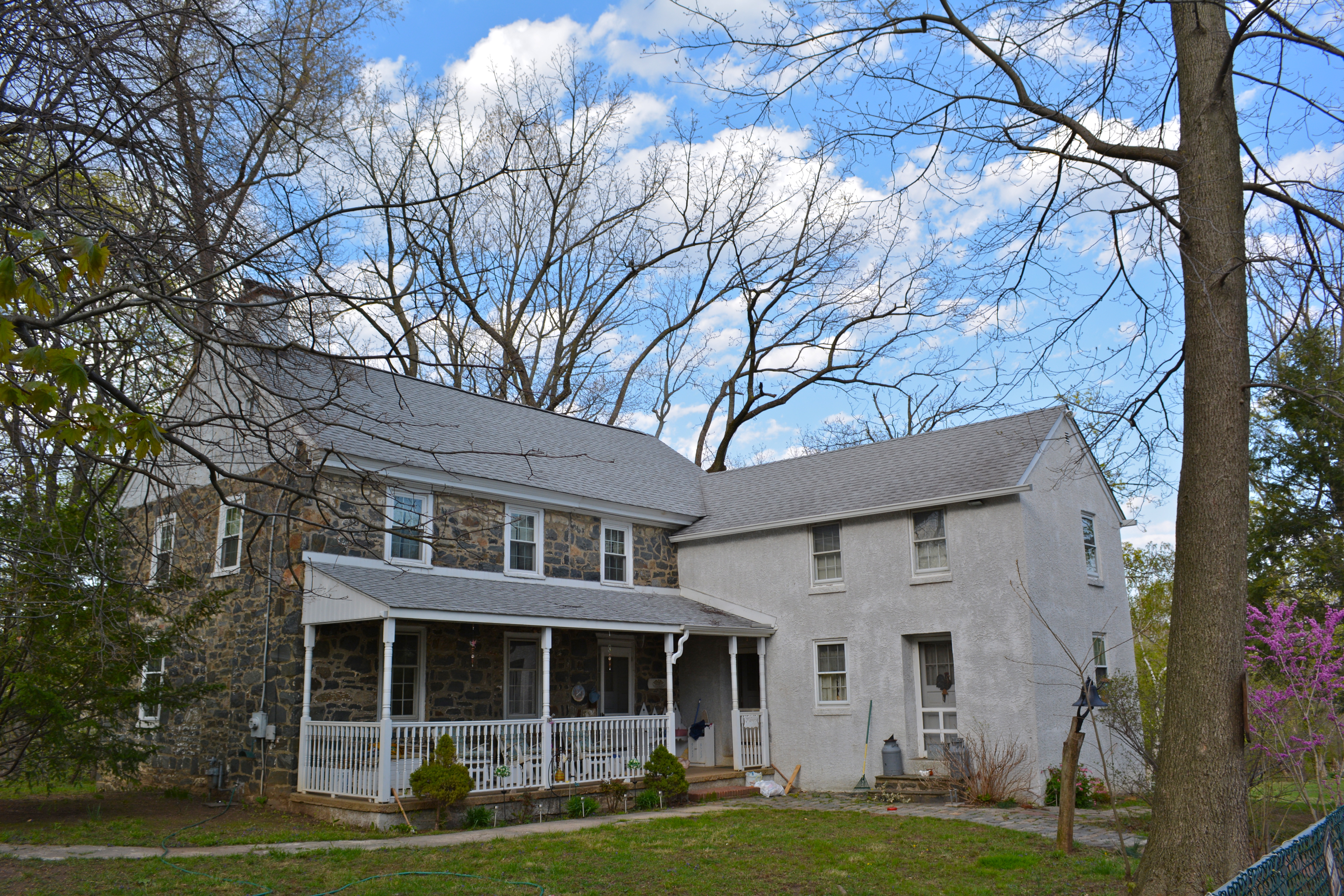
View from the southwest
