= Little Mill Creek (Christina River tributary) =

Little Mill Creek Tributary to Christina River
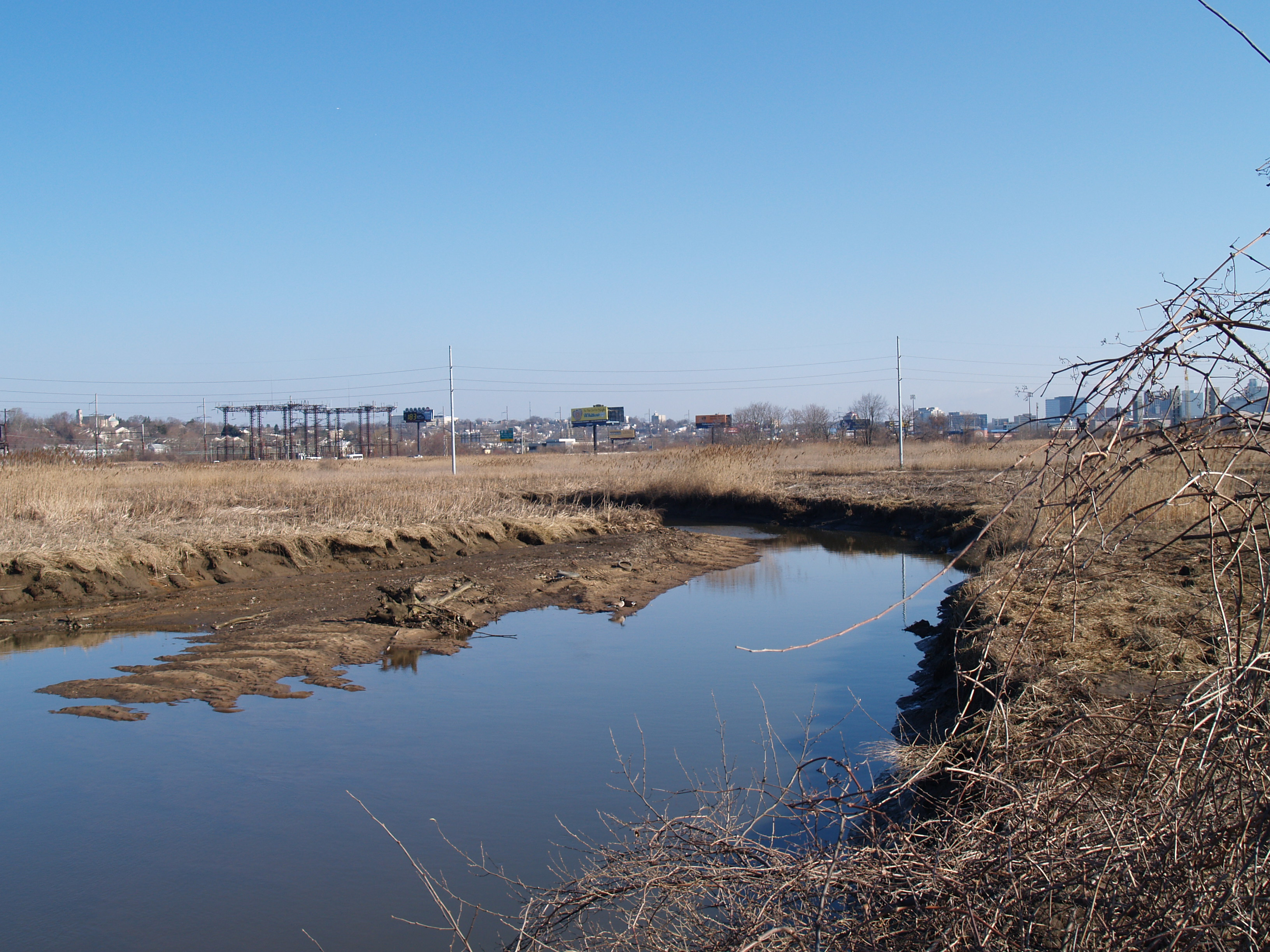
- Little Mill Creek at Russell Peterson Wildlife Refuge

- Location within Delaware Location within the United States

Location
- Country: United States
- State: Delaware
- County: New Castle
- City: Wilmington

Physical characteristics
- Source: Brandywine Creek divide
  - location: about 0.5 miles west of Greenville, Delaware
  - coordinates: 39°46′40″N 075°36′15″W
  - elevation: 315 ft (96 m)
- Mouth: Christina River
  - location: Wilmington, Delaware
  - coordinates: 39°43′07″N 075°34′03″W
  - elevation: 0 ft (0 m)
- Length: 3.29 mi (5.29 km)
- Basin size: 9.25 square miles (24.0 km^{2})
- Discharge
  - average: 13.64 cu ft/s (0.386 m^{3}/s) at mouth with Christina River

Basin features
- Progression: Christina River → Delaware River → Delaware Bay → Atlantic Ocean
- River system: Christina River
- Tributaries
  - left: Willow Run; Chestnut Run
  - right: unnamed tributaries
- Bridges: Carriage Road, Barley Mill Road, DE 48, Downs Drive, Faulkland Road, Rhode Island Avenue, DE 141, DE 2, DE 100, N Maryland Avenue, Major Street, I-95

Little Mill Creek is a 3.29 mi (5.29 km) long 3rd order tributary to Christina River in New Castle County, Delaware.

== Variant names ==
According to the Geographic Names Information System, it has also been known historically as:

- Mill Creek
- Taswaijeeskil
- Tesswijreskijl

== Course ==
Little Mill Creek rises on the Brandywine Creek divide about 0.5 miles west of Greenville in New Castle County, Delaware. Little Mill Creek then flows generally south to meet Christina River at Wilmington, Delaware.

== Watershed ==
Little Mill Creek drains 9.25 square miles (24.0 km^{2}) of area, receives about 46.5 in/year of precipitation, has a topographic wetness index of 494.65 and is about 14% forested.

== See also ==
- List of rivers of Delaware
