= Marshallton, Delaware =

Unincorporated community in Delaware, United States

- Unincorporated community
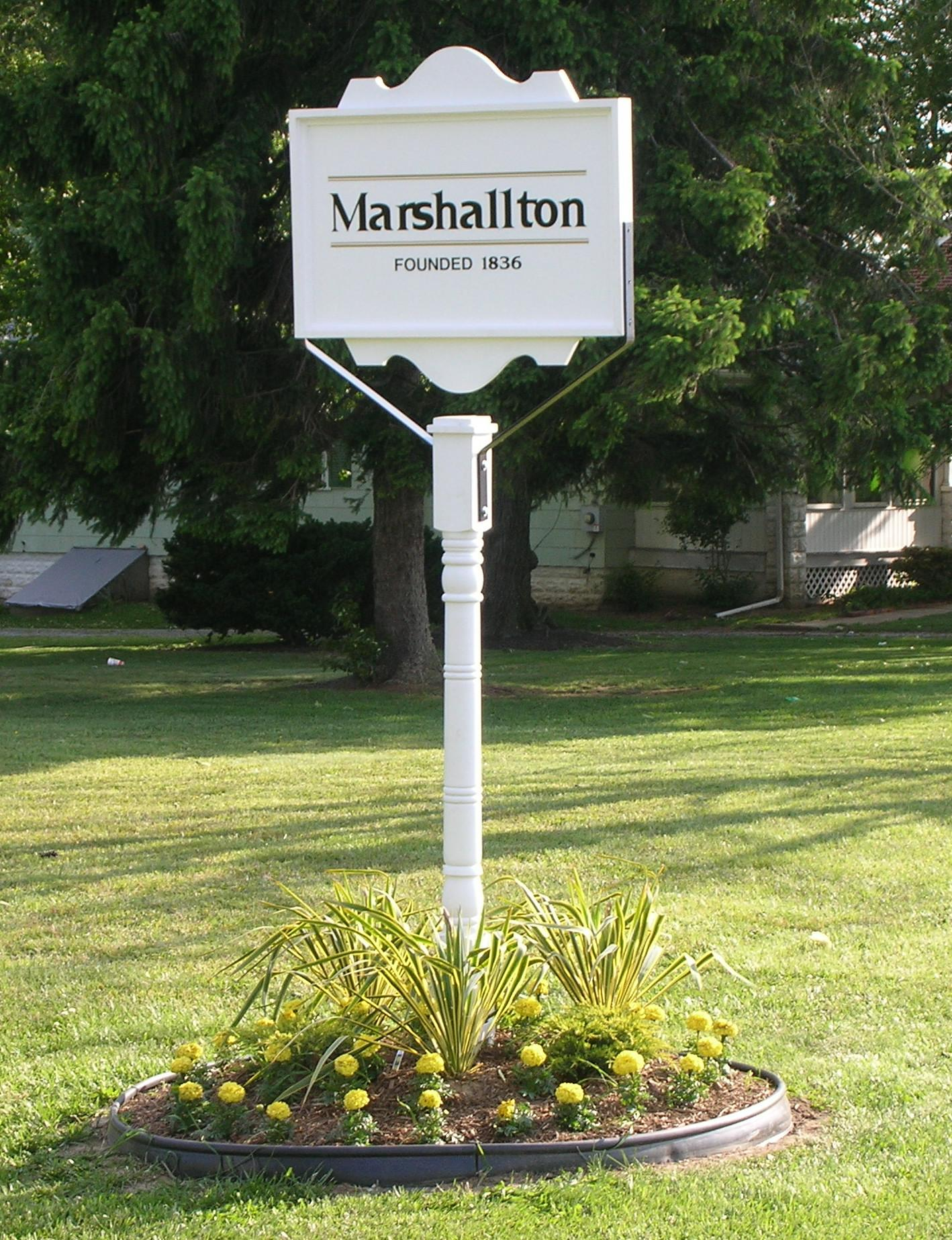
- Welcome sign on Old Capitol Trail

- Location within the state of Delaware Marshallton, Delaware (the United States)
- Coordinates: 39°43′32″N 75°39′15″W
- Country: United States
- State: Delaware
- County: New Castle
- Elevation: 89 ft (27 m)
- Time zone: UTC-5 (Eastern (EST))
  - Summer (DST): UTC-4 (EDT)
- ZIP code: 19808
- Area code: 302
- GNIS feature ID: 214274

Marshallton is an unincorporated community in Mill Creek Hundred, New Castle County, Delaware, United States. The community was founded in 1836 and is named for John Marshall, mill owner.

== History ==
Marshallton was originally called Hersey Bridge after a gristmill on the Red Clay Creek that was established by Solomon Hersey in 1765. On August 30, 1777 George Washington ordered his army to fall back toward Red Clay Creek during the wee hours of the morning. Here, Washington arranged his troops for battle. The troops immediately dug in, building redoubts and entrenchments. Cannons were placed on a rise "for half a mile as thick as they could stand." The new encampment covered a triangular area with Newport, Marshallton, and Stanton forming the connecting points. In 1836, the name of the community was changed to Marshallton after John Marshall, who built a rolling mill along the creek. The Greenbank Historic Area, Hickman Blacksmith Shop and House, William Julius "Judy" Johnson House, Marshallton United Methodist Church, and Springer-Cranston House are listed on the National Register of Historic Places.

== Geography ==
Marshallton is a residential suburb 5 miles (8.0 km) west of Wilmington, on Delaware Route 2. Marshallton is located along Red Clay Creek at 39°43′32″N 75°39′15″W. Delaware Park Horse Racing Track is to the southwest.

== See also ==
- Marshallton Panthers
- List of Registered Historic Places in New Castle County, Delaware
- Wilmington and Western Railroad
