= Mill Creek (White Clay Creek tributary) =

Mill Creek Tributary to White Clay Creek
- Location of Mill Creek mouth Mill Creek (White Clay Creek tributary) (the United States)

Location
- Country: United States
- State: Pennsylvania, Delaware
- Counties: Chester, New Castle

Physical characteristics
- Source: divide between Mill Creek and Broad Run (White Clay Creek)
  - location: Kennett Township, Chester County, Pennsylvania
  - coordinates: 39°47′55″N 75°43′10″W
  - elevation: 380 ft (120 m)
- Mouth: White Clay Creek
  - location: New Castle County, Delaware
  - coordinates: 39°42′32″N 75°39′09″W
  - elevation: 5 ft (1.5 m)
- Length: 8.33 mi (13.41 km)
- Basin size: 12.96 square miles (33.6 km^{2})
- Discharge
  - location: White Clay Creek
  - average: 18.62 cu ft/s (0.527 m^{3}/s) at mouth with White Clay Creek

Basin features
- Progression: White Clay Creek → Christina River → Delaware River → Delaware Bay → Atlantic Ocean
- River system: Christina River
- Tributaries
  - left: unnamed tributaries
  - right: unnamed tributaries
- Bridges: Southwood Road, Piersons Ridge, Loblolly Court, Slashpine Circle, Valley Road, Mill Creek Road, Brackenville Road, Mill Creek Road, Stoney Batter Road, Limestone Road, Milltown Road, Kirkwood Highway (DE 2), Telegraph Road, Delaware Park Blvd., DE 4

National Wild and Scenic Rivers System
- Designated: October 24, 2000

Mill Creek is a 9.6-mile-long (15.4 km) stream principally located in northern New Castle County, Delaware, a tributary of the White Clay Creek. It takes its name from the large number of mills (mostly gristmills and sawmills) located along it during the 18th and early 19th centuries.

It originates a short distance over the state line near Kaolin, Pennsylvania and flows east, then south into Delaware. It passes under the Lancaster Pike at Hockessin, where Swift Memorial Park has been laid out along the stream between Old Lancaster Pike and the Wilmington and Western Railroad tracks. Leaving Hockessin, the stream turns slightly to the west, and then sharply towards the southeast to flow through a deep, wooded gorge between suburban developments. Further down the gorge, Mill Creek passes through Limestone Hills Park, and then forms the western boundary of the DelCastle Recreation Area. Continuing south and passing under Limestone Road, the hills on either side diminish in height, and development increases, although the steep sides have protected the creek from direct encroachment. Passing through the neighborhood known as "Milltown", Lindell Park lies along the creek between Milltown Road and Kirkwood Highway. Below Kirkwood Highway, the valley begins to open, and the creek skirts Delaware Park and passes under the Wilmington and Christiana Turnpike just before it empties into the White Clay.

== Variant names ==
According to the Geographic Names Information System, it has also been known historically as:

- Lillefalskijlen

== See also ==
- Mill Creek Hundred, which takes its name from the creek
- List of rivers of Pennsylvania
- List of Delaware rivers
