= Red Clay Creek =

River in the United States

Red Clay Creek Tributary to White Clay Creek
- Red Clay Creek in Greenbank

- Location of Red Clay Creek mouth Red Clay Creek (the United States)

Location
- Country: United States
- State: Delaware
- County: New Castle

Physical characteristics
- Source: confluence of East and West Branches of Red Clay Creek
  - location: Southridge, Pennsylvania
  - coordinates: 39°49′04″N 075°41′33″W
  - elevation: 200 ft (61 m)
- Mouth: White Clay Creek
  - location: Stanton, Delaware
  - coordinates: 39°42′29″N 075°38′45″W
  - elevation: 0 ft (0 m)
- Length: 12.7 mi (20.4 km)
- Basin size: 54.53 square miles (141.2 km^{2})
- Discharge
  - average: 74.57 cu ft/s (2.112 m^{3}/s) at mouth with White Clay Creek

Basin features
- Progression: White Clay Creek → Christina River → Delaware River → Delaware Bay → Atlantic Ocean
- River system: Christina River
- Landmarks: Mount Cuba
- Tributaries
  - left: East Branch Red Clay Creek; Burrows Run
  - right: West Branch Red Clay Creek; Hyde Run

Red Clay Creek is a 12.7-mile-long (20.4 km) tributary of White Clay Creek, running through southeastern Pennsylvania and northern Delaware in the United States. As of 2000, portions of the creek are under wildlife habitat protection.

== Course ==
The East and West branches both rise in West Marlborough Township, Pennsylvania, near the hamlet of Upland, and flow south through Kennett Square before uniting just north of the Delaware border. The stream enters Delaware near the town of Yorklyn and flows southward through New Castle County, passing through Marshallton. Red Clay Creek empties into White Clay Creek near Stanton, approximately 5 miles (8.0 km) southwest of Wilmington. Ultimately, White Clay Creek enters the Christina River, also near Stanton.

== Tributaries ==
- Calf Run, located in the southeast of Mill Creek Hundred
- Pyle's Run, located in Christiana Hundred

== History ==
The creek serves as a boundary between the Hundreds of Mill Creek and Christiana. The Wilmington and Western Railroad follows the creek south from Yorklyn as far as Greenbank.

In the late 19th Century, several factories were located along Red Clay Creek, including those for the manufacture of flour, wool and iron.

The creek suffered from severe flooding in 1999 due to Hurricane Floyd and in 2003 due to Tropical Storm Henri.

Since 2000, portions of the river, along with other tributaries of White Clay Creek, have been protected as part of the White Clay Creek Wild and Scenic River.

== Bridges ==
- Ashland Covered Bridge, in New Castle County, Delaware
- Wooddale Bridge, in New Castle County, Delaware

== See also ==
- List of Delaware rivers
- List of rivers of Pennsylvania
