= Mendenhall, Pennsylvania =

Unincorporated community in Pennsylvania, US

- Unincorporated community
- Location within Pennsylvania
- Coordinates: 39°51′14″N 75°38′29″W
- Country: United States
- State: Pennsylvania
- County: Chester
- Township: Kennett
- Elevation: 328 ft (100 m)
- Time zone: UTC-5 (Eastern (EST))
  - Summer (DST): UTC-4 (EDT)
- ZIP code: 19357
- Area codes: 610 and 484
- GNIS feature ID: 1204151

Mendenhall is an unincorporated community in Kennett Township in Chester County, Pennsylvania, United States. Mendenhall is located at the intersection of Pennsylvania Route 52 and Hillendale Road.
