= White Clay Creek =

White Clay Creek Tributary to Christina River
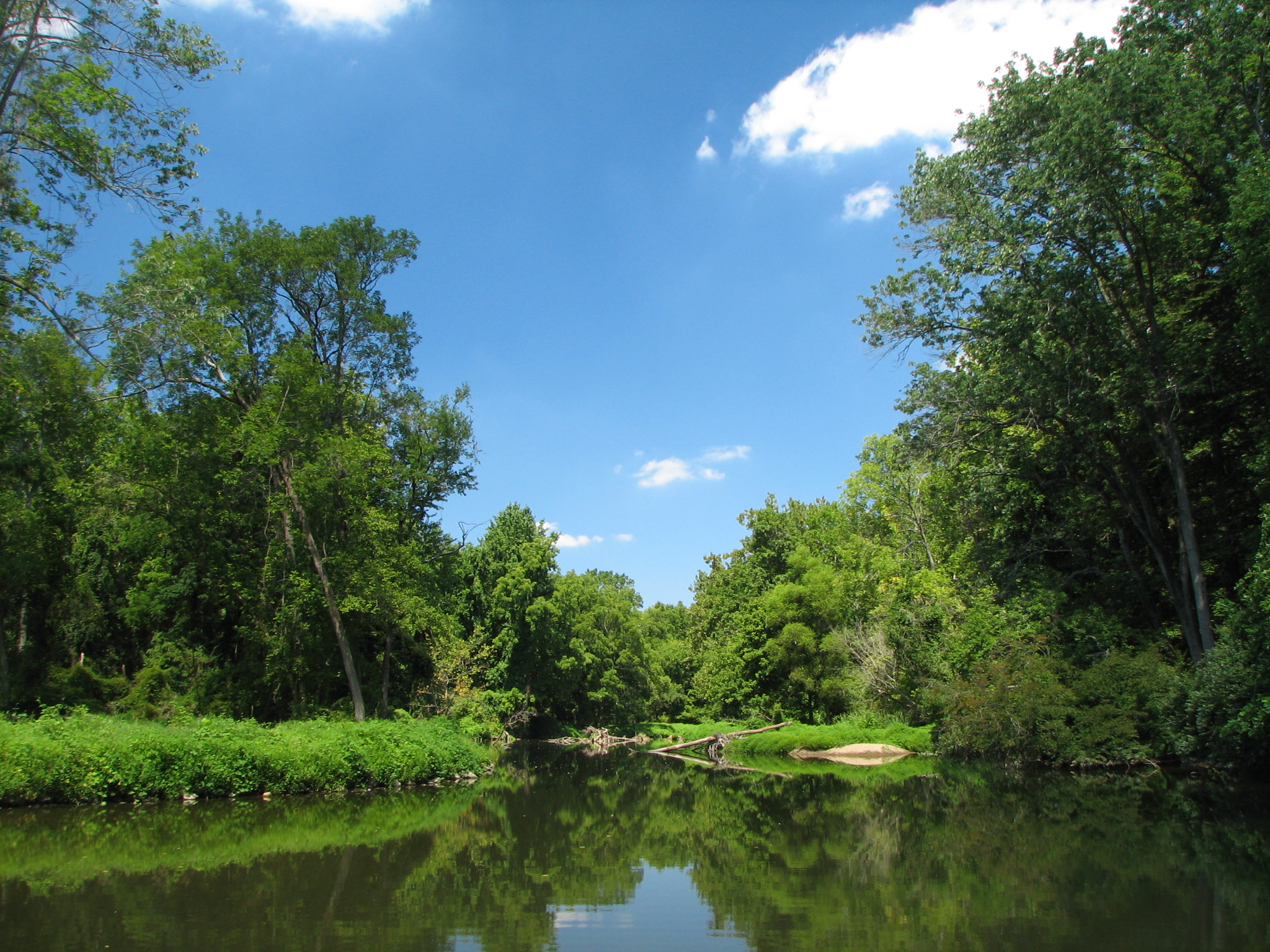
- White Clay Creek running through Newark, Delaware

- Location of White Clay Creek mouth White Clay Creek (the United States)

Location
- Country: United States
- State: Pennsylvania, Delaware
- Counties: Chester, New Castle
- City: Newark, DE

Physical characteristics
- Source: West Branch White Clay Creek
  - location: Penn Township, Chester County, Pennsylvania
  - coordinates: 39°48′57″N 75°52′09″W
- 2nd source: Middle Branch White Clay Creek
  - location: Londonderry Township, Chester County, Pennsylvania
  - coordinates: 39°51′40″N 75°52′20″W
- Source confluence
  - location: London Britain, Chester County, Pennsylvania
  - coordinates: 39°45′59″N 75°47′41″W
  - elevation: 259 ft (79 m)
- Mouth: Christina River
  - location: New Castle County, Delaware
  - coordinates: 39°41′51″N 75°37′19″W
  - elevation: 0 ft (0 m)
- Length: 18.5 mi (29.8 km)
- Basin size: 107 sq mi (280 km^{2})

Basin features
- Progression: Christina River → Delaware River → Delaware Bay → Atlantic Ocean
- Tributaries
  - left: East Branch White Clay Creek, Bogy Run, Middle Run, Pike Creek, Mill Creek, Red Clay Creek

National Wild and Scenic Rivers System
- Type: Scenic, Recreational
- Designated: October 24, 2000

White Clay Creek is an 18.5-mile-long (29.8 km) tributary of the Christina River in southern Pennsylvania and northern Delaware in the United States. It is renowned for its scenic character and is largely federally protected.

The 107-square-mile (280 km^{2}) White Clay Creek watershed is home to nearly 100,000 people and includes parts of Chester County, Pennsylvania and New Castle County, Delaware. The Pennsylvania portion still retains a rural character while the Delaware portion is more suburbanized. Sediment eroded from the rolling hills of Chester County is carried into the White Clay, probably accounting for the creek's name.

The majority of the stream is in the Piedmont region which is characterized by rolling hills, plateaus, and stream valleys. The southern portion of the stream, near Newark is in the Atlantic Coastal Plain, a relatively flat area that is dotted with large tidal wetlands. The White Clay Creek empties into the Christina River at Churchman's Marsh.

== East Branch ==
The East Branch, 13.5 miles (21.7 km) long, arises near the hamlet of Upland in West Marlborough Township. Flowing southward, it passes through Avondale, where it is joined by Trout Run. From Avondale, the former Pomeroy and Newark Railroad, abandoned in 1939, follows the creek southward. Further south, after the confluence of Egypt Run, the creek begins to turn and meander in a narrow gorge, passing through Landenberg, formerly a mill town and the junction of the Pomeroy & Newark with the Wilmington and Western Railroad. Exiting the gorge into a broader valley, the creek receives Broad Run shortly after entering the White Clay Creek Preserve. It joins the main body of the White Clay Creek in the Preserve, at the lost community of Yeatman.

== Middle Branch ==
The Middle Branch, 11.4 miles (18.3 km) long, originates in Londonderry Township. Flowing southward along the western edge of West Grove, it turns east, south again, and then east again to meet Indian Run. Turning south, it cuts sharply through the hills near Chesterville and meets the West Branch to form the main stem.

== West Branch ==
The West Branch, 8.0 miles (12.9 km) long, rises near Kelton and flows south and east through New London Township, gradually turning to the east where it meets the Middle Branch to form the main stem.

== Main stem ==
The main stem of White Clay Creek is formed by the junction of the West and Middle branches. From here, it enters a narrow valley and then the White Clay Creek Preserve, meeting the East Branch at Yeatman. It flows south through the White Clay Creek Preserve and enters New Castle County, Delaware and White Clay Creek State Park approximately 12 miles (19 km) west of Wilmington. Trails parallel the creek, some of them using parts of the Pomeroy & Newark roadbed, which follows the creek to the outskirts of Newark. The creek then turns away to the east, receiving Middle Run and Pike Creek. As it approaches the Christina estuary, the valley opens up, and it passes Delaware Park. Mill Creek flows into it, shortly followed by its largest tributary, Red Clay Creek. The conjoined streams turn southwest and then back to the east as they loop around Bread and Cheese Island, formed between the Red Clay, White Clay, and Hershey Run by a backchannel now filled. Just after passing the island, White Clay Creek enters the Christina approximately 5 miles (8 km) southwest of Wilmington at Churchman's Marsh.

== History and ecology ==
The river's historical sites include lime kilns and 19th-century mills. Its lower course includes the most extensive Piedmont forests remaining in Delaware that are home to several key species, including the federally listed endangered bog turtle. In 2000, the United States Congress designated 190 miles (310 km) of White Clay Creek and its tributaries as part of the National Wild and Scenic River program.

== See also ==
- List of Delaware rivers
- List of rivers of Pennsylvania
