= Christina River =

River in Delaware, United States

Christina River Tributary to Delaware River
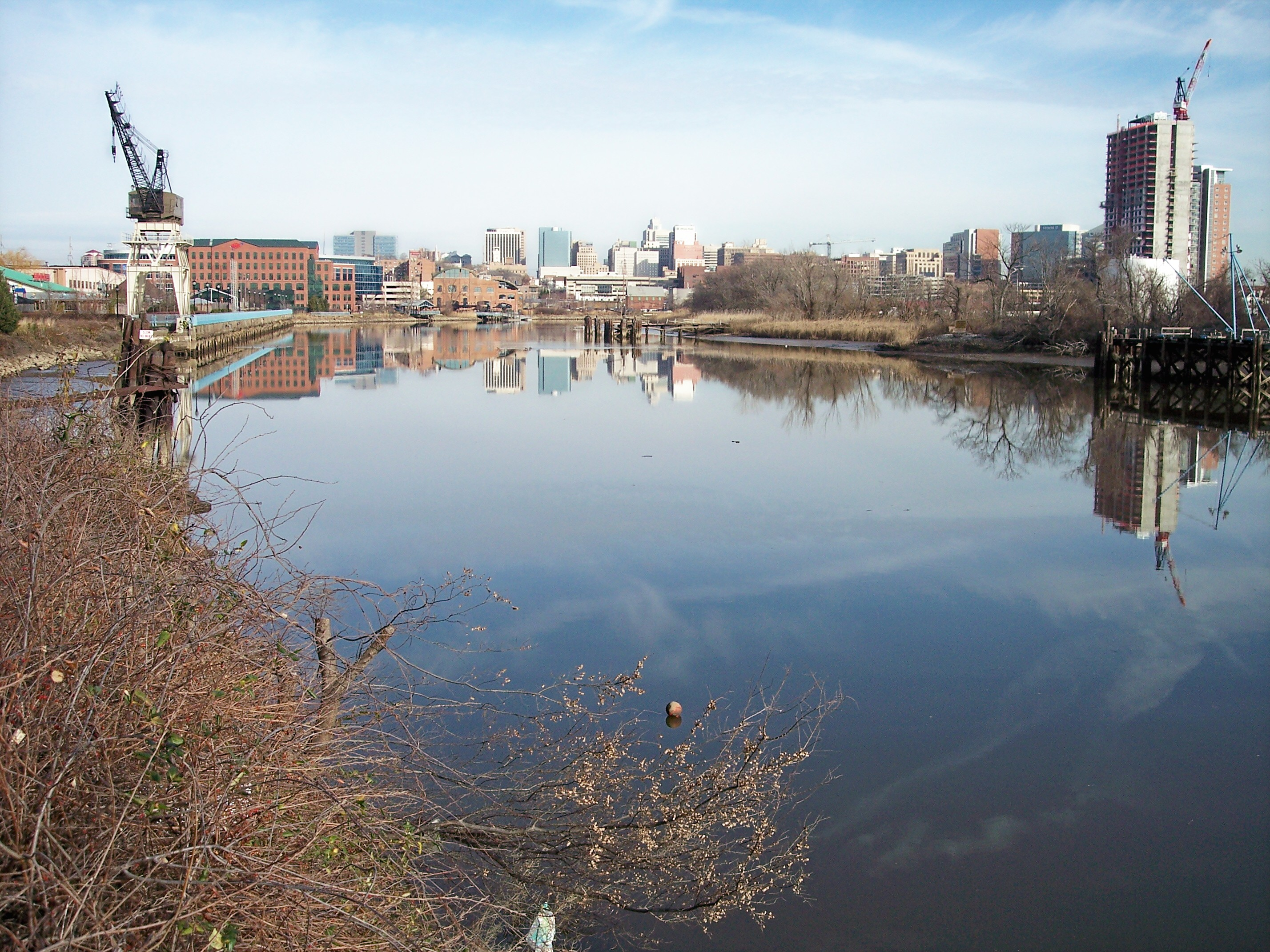
- The Christina River in Wilmington in 2006

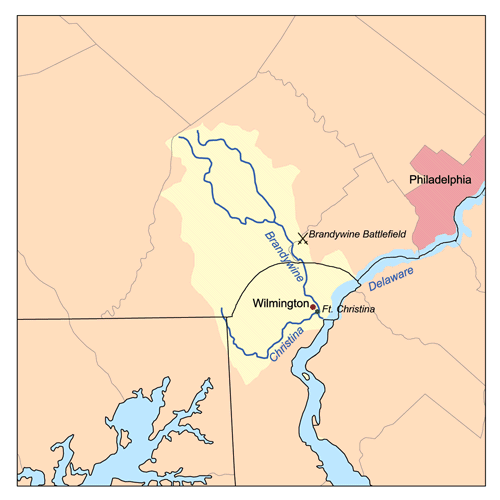
- Christina River/Brandywine Creek watershed

Location
- Country: United States
- State: Pennsylvania, Maryland, Delaware
- County: New Castle (DE); Chester (PA)
- Cities: Newark, DE, Newport, DE, Wilmington, DE

Physical characteristics
- Source
  - location: Franklin Township, Chester County, Pennsylvania
  - coordinates: 39°44′47″N 75°48′53″W
  - elevation: 380 ft (120 m)
- Mouth: Delaware River
  - location: Wilmington, New Castle County, Delaware
  - coordinates: 39°42′57″N 75°30′44″W
  - elevation: 0 ft (0 m)
- Length: 35 mi (56 km) approximately
- Basin size: 565 sq mi (1,460 km^{2})

Basin features
- Progression: Delaware River → Delaware Bay → Atlantic Ocean
- Tributaries
  - left: East Branch Christina River, White Clay Creek, Little Mill Creek, Brandywine Creek
  - right: West Branch Christina River

The Christina River is a tributary of the Delaware River, approximately 35 miles (56 km) long, in northern Delaware. It also flows through small areas of southeastern Pennsylvania and northeastern Maryland. Near its mouth, the river flows past downtown Wilmington, Delaware, forming the city's harbor for traffic on the Delaware River. The Port of Wilmington, opened in 1923 at the river's mouth, handles international cargo and trade.

The river rises in southeastern Pennsylvania in Franklin Township in southern Chester County, and initially flows southeastwardly, passing through the northeastern extremity of Maryland in northeastern Cecil County, into New Castle County in Delaware, where it flows through western and southern areas of the city of Newark and then turns northeastwardly, passing the town of Newport and approaching Wilmington from the southwest. It receives White Clay Creek from the west near Newport, and Brandywine Creek in Wilmington, approximately 2 miles (3 km) upstream of its mouth.

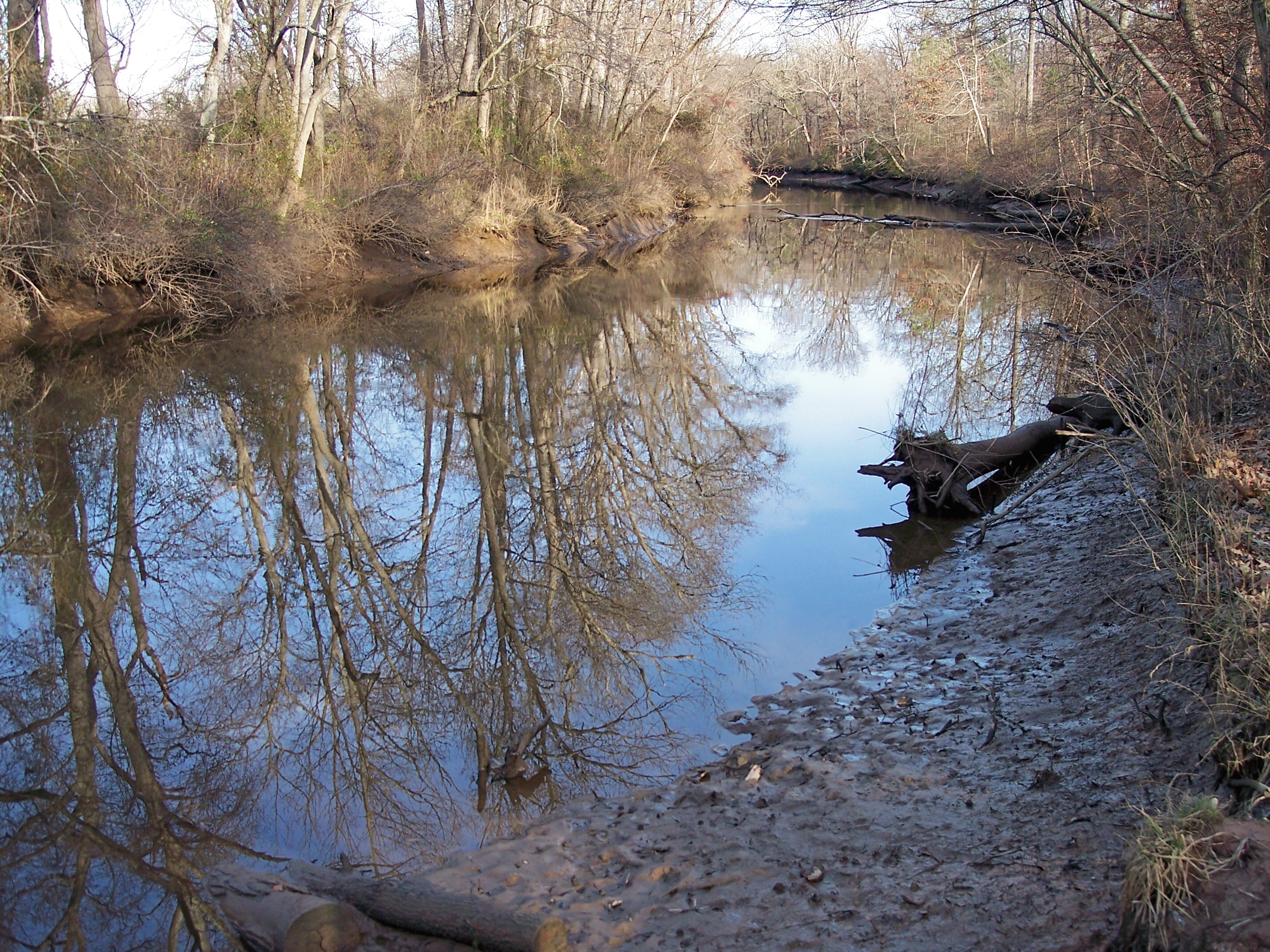
The Christina River in its upper course in 2006, near the community of Christiana

The Christina River and its tributaries drain an area of 565 square miles, 1,460 km^{2}. Brandywine Creek, despite being a tributary of the Christina, drains 58% of this area (325 square miles, 840 km^{2}). White Clay Creek and its tributary, Red Clay Creek, drain a further 28% of the basin (161 square miles, 420 km^{2}). Including Brandywine Creek, 71% of the Christina's basin is in Pennsylvania (400 square miles, 1,000 km^{2}); 28% is in Delaware (157 square miles, 410 km^{2}); and 1% is in Maryland (8 square miles, 21 km^{2}). The basin's streams supply approximately 100 million gallons (400 million liters) of water per day for more than half a million people in the three states, providing 75% of the water supply for New Castle County, Delaware, and more than 40% of the water supply for Chester County, Pennsylvania.

The river was named for Queen Christina of Sweden. Fort Christina, the first permanent European settlement in Delaware, was established at the confluence of Brandywine Creek and the Christina River in 1638 as a part of the Swedish colony of New Sweden. The fort was captured by the Dutch in 1655, and by the English in 1664.

In 1980, Wilmington Waterways formed, promoting waterfront awareness and festivals from 1982-88.rowing teams practice along the Christina River, among them Wilmington Rowing Center (WRC) and Wilmington Youth Rowing Association. In addition, there is a fall "head race" occurring on the river by the name of the Head of the Christina held every year in the boat house of Wilmington youth rowing association. WYRA moved its boathouse to a renovated P&J building in 1998, and in 2014, WRC moved from the outlets to a building across the street from WYRA – the beginning of the Christina’s own ‘Boathouse Row’.

Just south of downtown Wilmington, the Christina provides home port to the "Kalmar Nyckel", Delaware's official Tall Ship. Co-located with the Kalmar Nyckel is the home port to the U.S. Coast Guard Auxiliary's Search and Rescue Detachment (SARDET) Wilmington.

The Christina River is also one of many Striped Bass spawning areas that empty into the Delaware River.

The Christina Riverwalk makes up a segment of the East Coast Greenway, a 3,000 mile long system of trails connecting Maine to Florida.

== Variant names and spellings ==
According to the Geographic Names Information System, the Christina River has also been known historically as:

- Christeen Creek
- Christeen River
- Christen River
- Christian Creek
- Christiana Creek
- Christiana River
- Christianna Creek
- Christians Creek
- Christiany River
- Christien Creek
- Christien River
- Christina Creek
- Christine Creek
- Christine River
- Elbe River
- Manques Kill
- Minquaas Kill
- Minquas Kill
- Minquas River
- Minques Kill
- Minquess Kill
- Sickpeckons
- Sippunk
- Supeckonagh
- Tasswaijres

The river was normally known as the Christiana River until 1937, when an act of the Delaware State legislature changed the spelling to Christina.

== See also ==
- List of Delaware rivers
- List of Maryland rivers
- List of Pennsylvania rivers
- White Clay Creek
