= Edenridge, Delaware =

Unincorporated community in Delaware, United States

- Unincorporated community
- Location within Delaware Location within the United States
- Coordinates: 39°47′55″N 75°33′44″W
- Country: United States
- State: Delaware
- County: New Castle
- Elevation: 354 ft (108 m)
- Time zone: UTC-5 (Eastern (EST))
  - Summer (DST): UTC-4 (EDT)
- Area code: 302
- GNIS feature ID: 217584

Edenridge is an unincorporated community in New Castle County, Delaware, United States in the Brandywine Hundred, north of Wilmington.

== Geography ==
Edenridge lies west of Concord Pike (U.S. Route 202) and east of Brandywine Creek State Park. Edenridge is located near the intersection of Mt. Lebanon Road and Sharpley Road between of Talleyville and Rockland. It is part of the ZIP Code Tabulation Area for 19803.

The grounds of Mount Lebanon Methodist Episcopal Church lie on a western edge of the subdivision. Husbands Run, a tributary of Brandywine Creek, flows through the community. Woodley Park abuts the neighborhood.

== History ==
Like neighboring Sharpley, Woodbrook and Tavistock, Edenridge was developed by Woodlawn Trustees. The neighborhoods were included in the master plan for development of the Brandywine Hundred created by Charles Wellford Leavitt in 1922. When originally laid in the mid-1960s the neighborhood was 11 streets on 52 acres. Land sales from the properties were used to subsidize the maintenance of Woodlawn housing in the Flats neighborhood in Wilmington. The first house went up in 1966. Many of the homes were custom or semi-custom built for the original owners. Deed restrictions were established in 1964. In 1994, many residents felt that regulations originally imposed by Woodlawn Trustees were beneficial.
