= Tavistock, Delaware =

Unincorporated community in Delaware, United States

- Unincorporated community
- Location within Delaware Location within the United States
- Coordinates: 39°48′20″N 75°33′29″W
- Country: United States
- State: Delaware
- County: New Castle
- Elevation: 381 ft (116 m)
- Time zone: UTC-5 (Eastern (EST))
  - Summer (DST): UTC-4 (EDT)
- Area code: 302
- GNIS feature ID: 217585

Tavistock is an unincorporated community in New Castle County, Delaware, United States. It is within ZIP Code Tabulation Area for 19803.

== Geography ==
Tavistock is northwest of Wilmington in the Brandywine Hundred. It is located on U.S. Route 202 northwest of Mt. Lebanon Road between Talleyville and Rockland. It abuts both Brandywine Creek State Park and Woodley Park, where Husbands Run, a tributary to the creek which runs through the neighborhood, rises. The community includes 176 homes.

== History ==
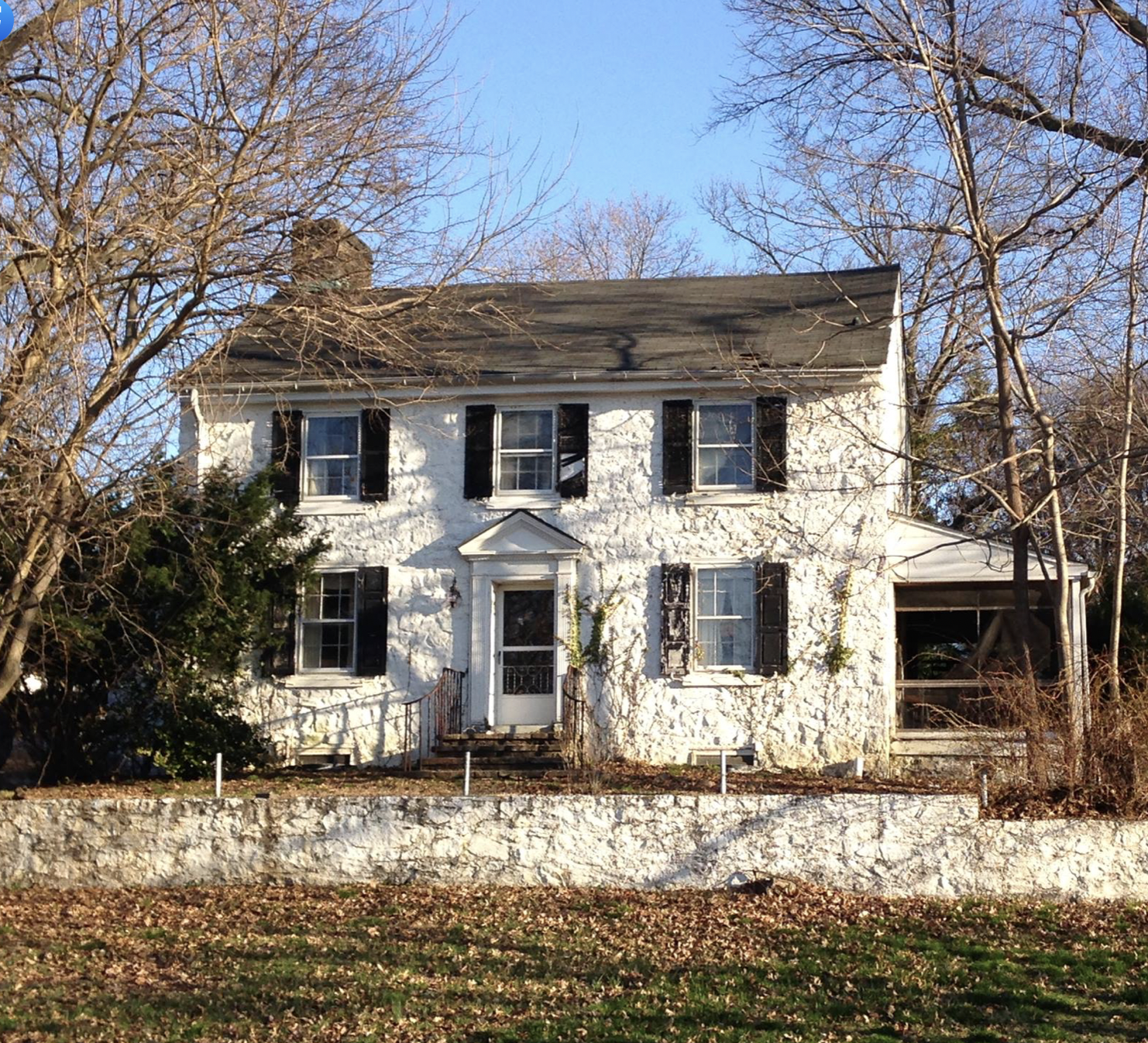
Talley homestead

Tavistock was originally developed by Woodlawn Trustees, The land on which it is sited once belonged to E.B. Talley, for whom nearby Talleyville is named. It was acquired in 1906 by Woodlawn Trustees, which had been created in 1901 by Quaker philanthropist William Poole Bancroft, who realised that Wilmington would grow northward along the Brandywine Creek. To promote orderly growth, and subsidize land preservation and affordable housing, Woodlawn developed residential communities set back from Brandywine Creek and west of Concord Pike (U.S. 202) including Alapocas, Woodbrook, Sharpley and Edenridge, The neighborhoods have been described as a "string of pearls". They were included in the master plan for development of the Brandywine Hundred created by Charles Wellford Leavitt in 1922.

Tavistock was developed in the mid-1960s and included a one-acre, wooded lot for the former Talley homestead, which was envisioned as "focal point" of the community, but had deteriorated by 2015.
