= Sharpley, Delaware =

Unincorporated community in Delaware, United States

- Unincorporated community
- Location within Delaware Location within the United States
- Coordinates: 39°48′00″N 75°33′19″W
- Country: United States
- State: Delaware
- County: New Castle
- Elevation: 374 ft (114 m)
- Time zone: UTC-5 (Eastern (EST))
  - Summer (DST): UTC-4 (EDT)
- Area code: 302
- GNIS feature ID: 217104

Sharpley is an unincorporated community in New Castle County, Delaware, United States in the Brandywine Hundred. It is within ZIP Code Tabulation Area for 19803.

== Geography ==
Sharpley is located west of U.S. Route 202, 0.4 miles (0.64 km) north of Wilmington It lies between Rockland and Talleyville and adjacent to Woodbrook, Tavistock, and Edenridge. Husbands Run and its tributary Willow Run rise in the neighborhood.

== History ==
The name Sharpley is from a farmer in the area first recorded in 1691.

Like neighboring Woodbrook, Edenridge, and Tavistock, Sharpley was developed by Woodlawn Trustees. The process began in the 1950s and continued into the 1970s.

== Notable person ==
- Gregory Lavelle, Republican member of the Delaware General Assembly from 2001 to 2019
