= Brandywine Creek (Christina River tributary) =

Creek in Pennsylvania and Delaware, US

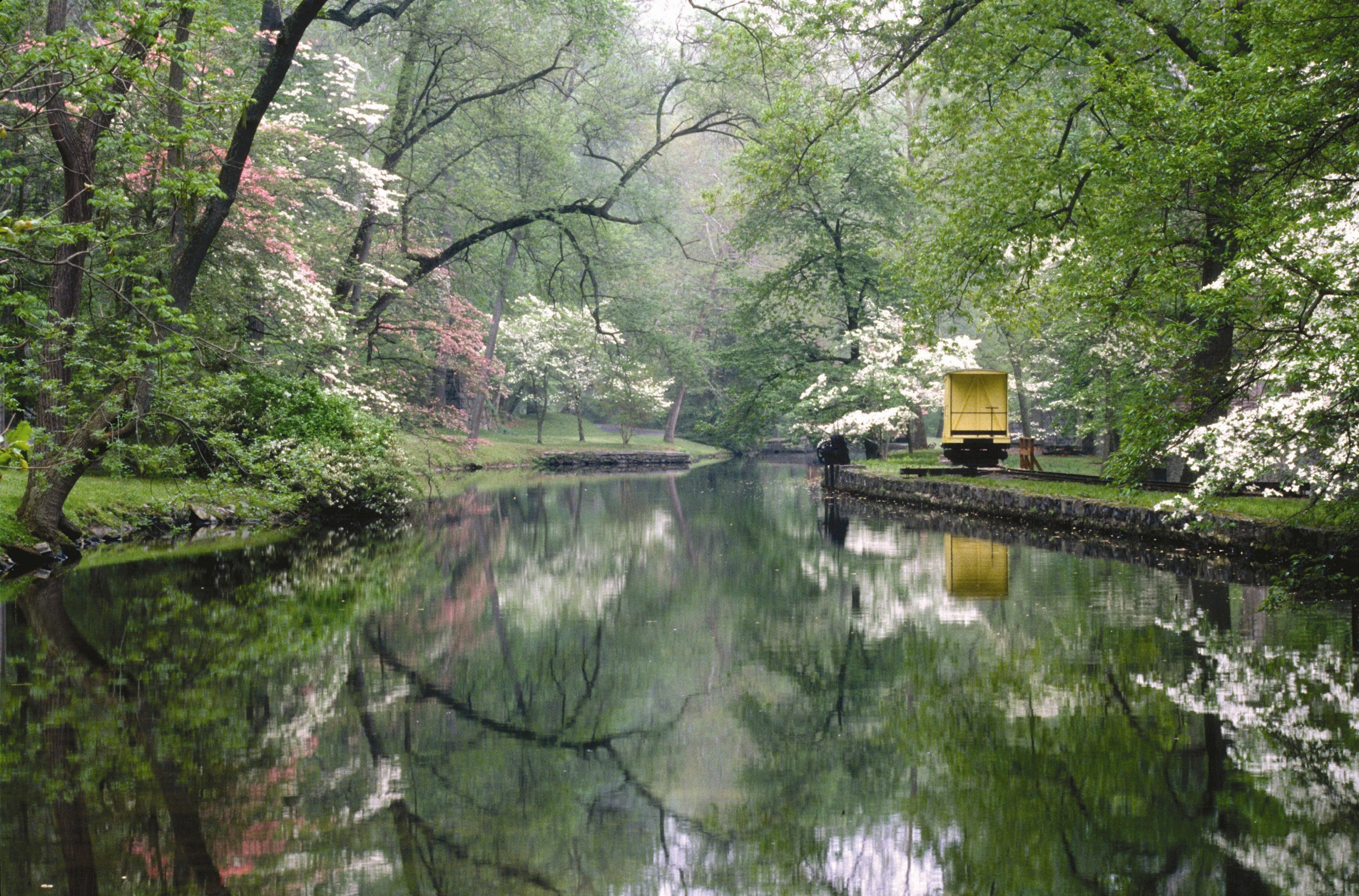
- Hagley mill race on the Brandywine

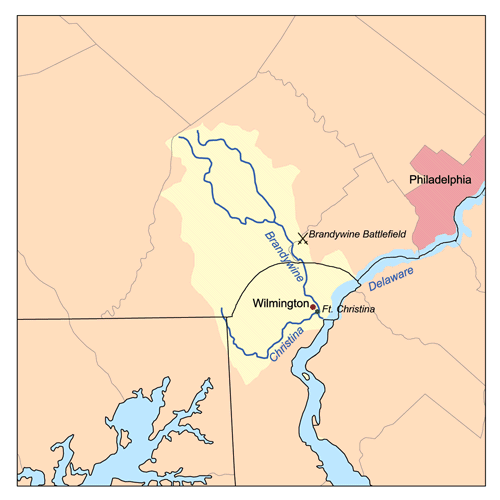
- Christina River Basin, including Brandywine Creek

Location
- Country: United States
- State: Pennsylvania, Delaware
- Cities: Chadds Ford, Pennsylvania, Wilmington, Delaware

Physical characteristics
- Source: West Branch Brandywine Creek
  - location: Honey Brook Township, Chester County, Pennsylvania
  - coordinates: 40°06′51″N 75°55′35″W
  - elevation: 850 ft (260 m)
- 2nd source: East Branch Brandywine Creek
  - location: Honey Brook Township, Chester County, Pennsylvania
  - coordinates: 40°07′09″N 75°53′15″W
  - elevation: 686 ft (209 m)
- Source confluence
  - location: East Bradford and Pocopson Townships, Chester County, Pennsylvania, US
  - coordinates: 39°55′21″N 75°38′58″W
  - elevation: 184 ft (56 m)
- Mouth: Christina River
  - location: Wilmington, New Castle County, Delaware, US
  - coordinates: 39°43′55″N 75°31′53″W
  - elevation: 0 ft (0 m)
- Length: 20 mi (32 km)
- Basin size: 300 sq mi (780 km^{2})
- Discharge
  - location: Wilmington
  - average: 408 cu ft/s (11.6 m^{3}/s)

Basin features
- Progression: Christina River → Delaware River → Delaware Bay → Atlantic Ocean
- Tributaries
  - left: Plum Run; Radley Run; Harvey Run; Wilson Run; Beaver Creek; Ramsey Run; Rocky Run; Husbands Run; Alapocas Run
  - right: Pocopson Creek; Bennetts Run; Ring Run; Craigs Mill Run

Brandywine Creek (also called the Brandywine River) is a tributary of the Christina River in southeastern Pennsylvania and northern Delaware in the United States. The Lower Brandywine (the main stem) is 20.4 miles (32.8 km) long and is a designated Pennsylvania Scenic River with several tributary streams. The East Branch and West Branch of the creek originate within 2 miles (3 km) of each other on the slopes of Welsh Mountain in Honey Brook Township, Pennsylvania, about 20 miles (32 km) northwest of their confluence.

The mouth of the creek on the Christina River in present-day Wilmington, Delaware, is the site of the New Sweden colony, where colonists first landed on March 29, 1638. The Battle of Brandywine was fought around the creek near Chadds Ford, Pennsylvania, on September 11, 1777, during the American Revolution. Water-powered gristmills in Brandywine Village, near the creek mouth, and the nearby DuPont gunpowder mill were important in developing American industry before the introduction of steam power.

== Course ==
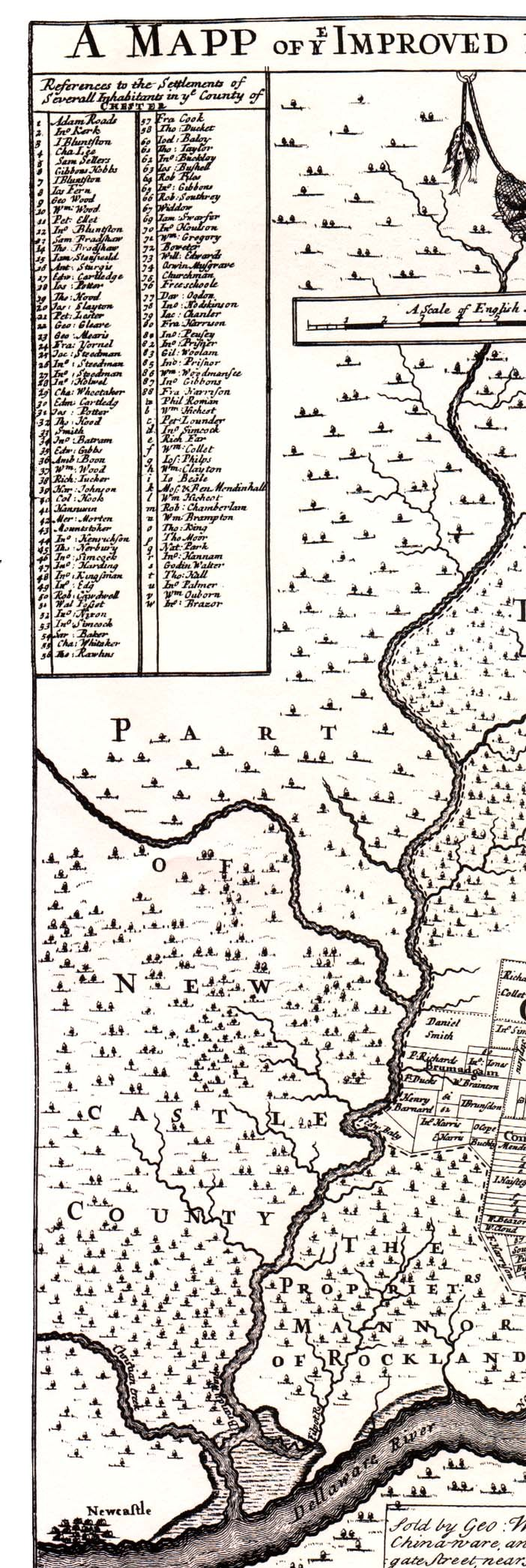
The Brandywine and its East Branch from Thomas Holme's 1687 map of Pennsylvania

The headwaters of both the East Branch and West Branch of Brandywine Creek are in western Chester County, Pennsylvania, near Honey Brook. The East Branch and West Branch flow southeast for 27.4 miles (44.1 km) and 33.1 miles (53.3 km), respectively, to their confluence about 10 miles (16 km) southeast of Coatesville, between East Bradford Township and Pocopson Township. The combined drainage of the East Branch and West Branch, downstream of the confluence, is defined as Brandywine Creek and continues to flow southeast through Chester County, past Chadds Ford, Delaware County, Pennsylvania then enters the state of Delaware about 5 miles (8 km) north of Wilmington.

The creek continues south through First State National Historical Park and Brandywine Creek State Park, into Wilmington, where it flows through Brandywine Park near the city center. Brandywine Creek joins the Christina River 1 mile (1.6 km) east of downtown Wilmington and about 2 miles (3 km) upstream from the mouth of the Christina, which also includes flows from the White Clay Creek and Red Clay Creek basins, and finally discharges into the Delaware River estuary. The confluence of the Christina and Delaware rivers is the approximate dividing point between the freshwater Delaware River and the saltwater Delaware Bay.

In Pennsylvania, Chadds Ford, Elam, Downingtown, Unionville, and parts of West Chester, are all in the Brandywine Valley, as well as the Delaware towns of Centreville, Greenville, Montchanin, Hockessin, and Yorklyn. Nearby Avondale (in the White Clay Creek basin) and Kennett Square, Pennsylvania (in the Red Clay Creek basin) are often considered part of the Brandywine Valley.

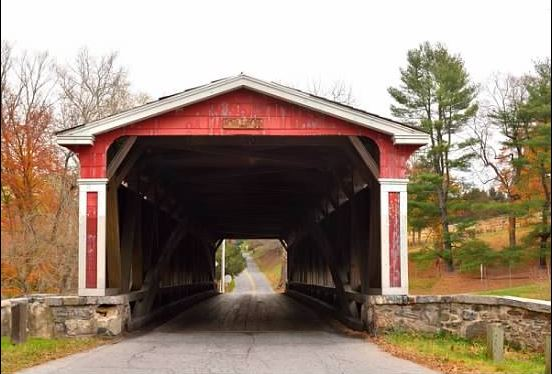
Smith's Bridge over the Brandywine Creek.

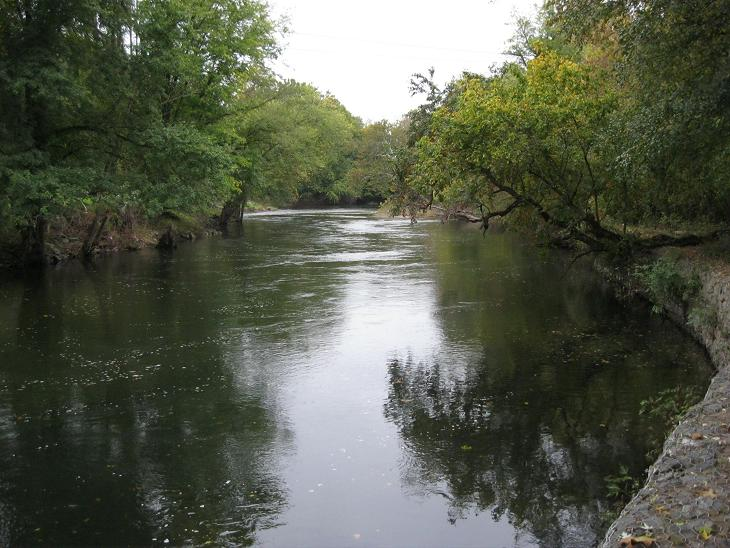
Brandywine Creek looking upstream from the Brandywine River Museum at Chadds Ford

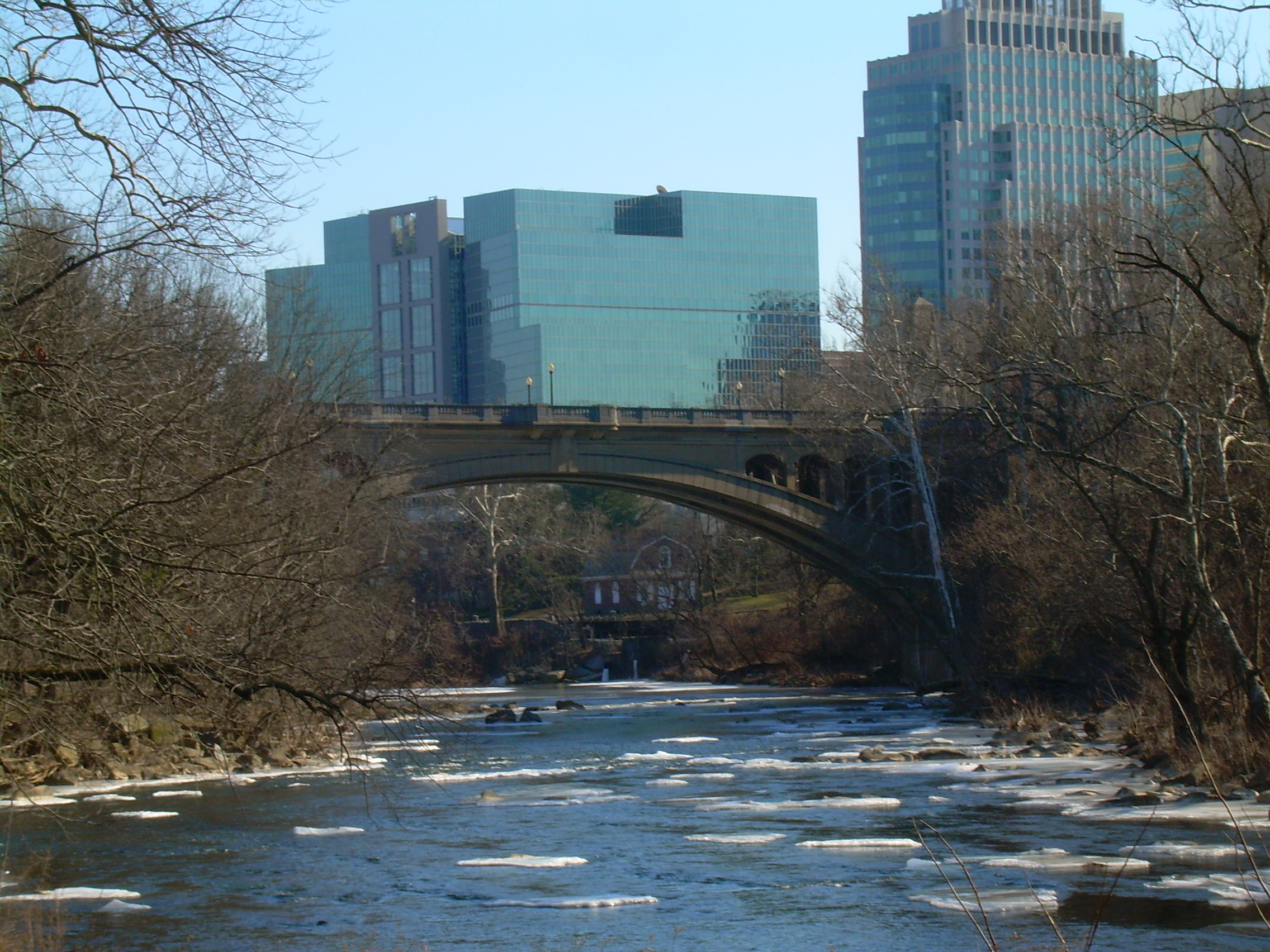
Brandywine Creek in Brandywine Park near downtown Wilmington in February 2007, looking downstream toward Washington Street Bridge

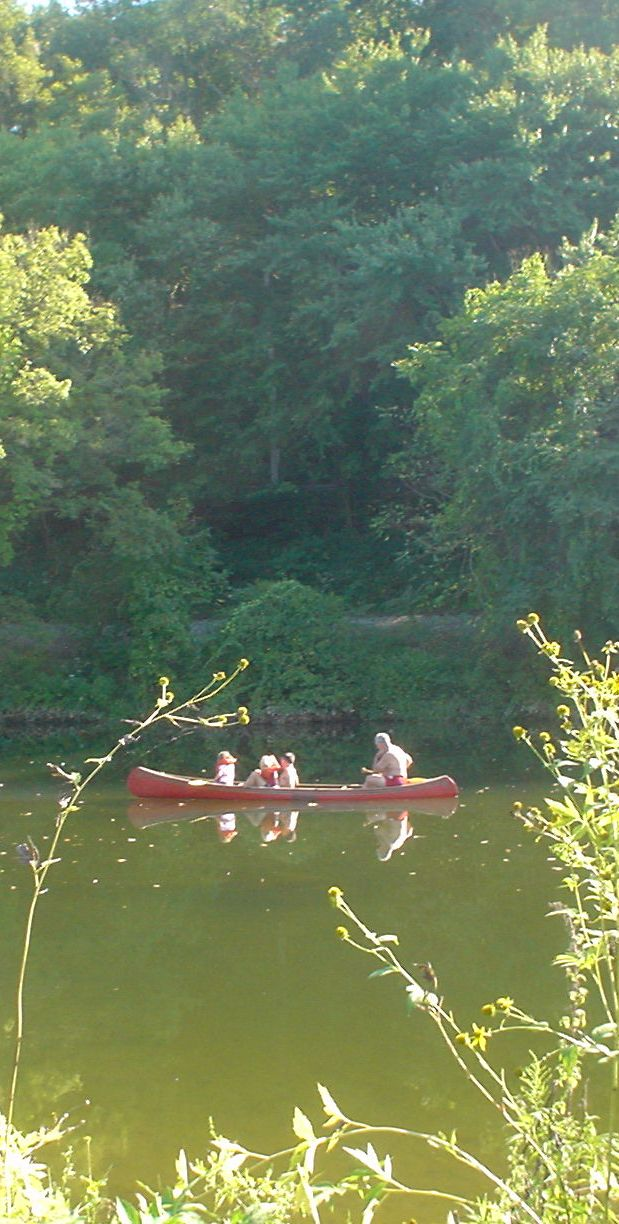
Canoeing near Pocopson

== History ==
Native Americans of the Algonquian-speaking Lenape (or Delaware) Nation lived in the area between the Hudson River Valley and southern Delaware before the European settlement. They lived by hunting, farming corn, beans, and squash, and by fishing. The Brandywine had an especially rich shad fishery. The Lenape called the creek Wauwaset, Wawasiungh, or Wawassan, and other Native American names for it included Suspecough and Trancocopanican.

The first European settlement on the Brandywine was Swedish. On March 29, 1638, Peter Minuit, who had earlier explored the area for the Dutch, founded the colony of New Sweden near the confluence of the Christina and Brandywine, at Fort Christina, in present-day Wilmington. About 600 Swedes, Finns, and Dutch settled in New Sweden. They tended to settle along the Delaware River rather than move inland along the Brandywine and are credited with introducing the log cabin into America. They called the creek Fiskiekylen, or "Fish Creek", and the Dutch heritage is also reflected in Fiske Creek and variant names using the Dutch word "Kill" or stream, Bainwend Kill, Brandewyn Kill, and Brandywine Kill. The creek's current name may be from an old Dutch word for brandy or gin, brandewijn, or from the Swedish word brännvin (Swedish vodka). During the colonisation of the Swedes the creek was called brännvins kilen. It has been asserted that in 1655, a Dutch vessel carrying brandy, wintered in the stream and was sunk due to ice accumulation. The name might also derive from an early mill owner, Andreas Brainwende or Brantwyn. A 1681 map labels the creek Brande wine Cr. Thomas Holme's 1687 map of Pennsylvania gives the name as simply Brandy Wine and shows it flowing into Christian Creek and then the Delaware River.

The Swedes, Dutch and English disputed possession of the area until 1674, when the English gained control. William Penn was granted a charter for Pennsylvania in 1681 and gained control over the "lower three counties," as Delaware was then known, soon thereafter. The population of New Sweden had only reached about 1,000, on the western shore of the Delaware, by the time of Penn's arrival. By 1687, a Swedish colonist, Tyman Stidham, opened the first mill on the Brandywine, near Wilmington. Holme's 1687 map shows only five land claims along the Brandywine, all near present-day Chadds Ford. Land claims of the earlier Swedish and Dutch colonists were not noted on this map.

While the Lenape still remained along the Brandywine, they had by this time been decimated by European diseases and wars with Susquehannock and later Iroquois tribes over control of the fur trade with Europeans. Their estimated population had fallen from 10,000 to 20,000 in 1600 to 2,000 in 1682. The Lenape signed a series of treaties with the Europeans, beginning with a 1682 treaty with William Penn, but were forced out of eastern Pennsylvania by the time of the French and Indian War. During the 1720s and 1730s, the Lenape claimed that William Penn had granted them all the land 1 mile on each side of the creek, and complained that mill dams on the creek were ruining their shad fishery. Hannah Freeman (1730–1802), believed to be the last Lenape to have lived in Chester County, is buried in Embreeville, near the forks of the creek.

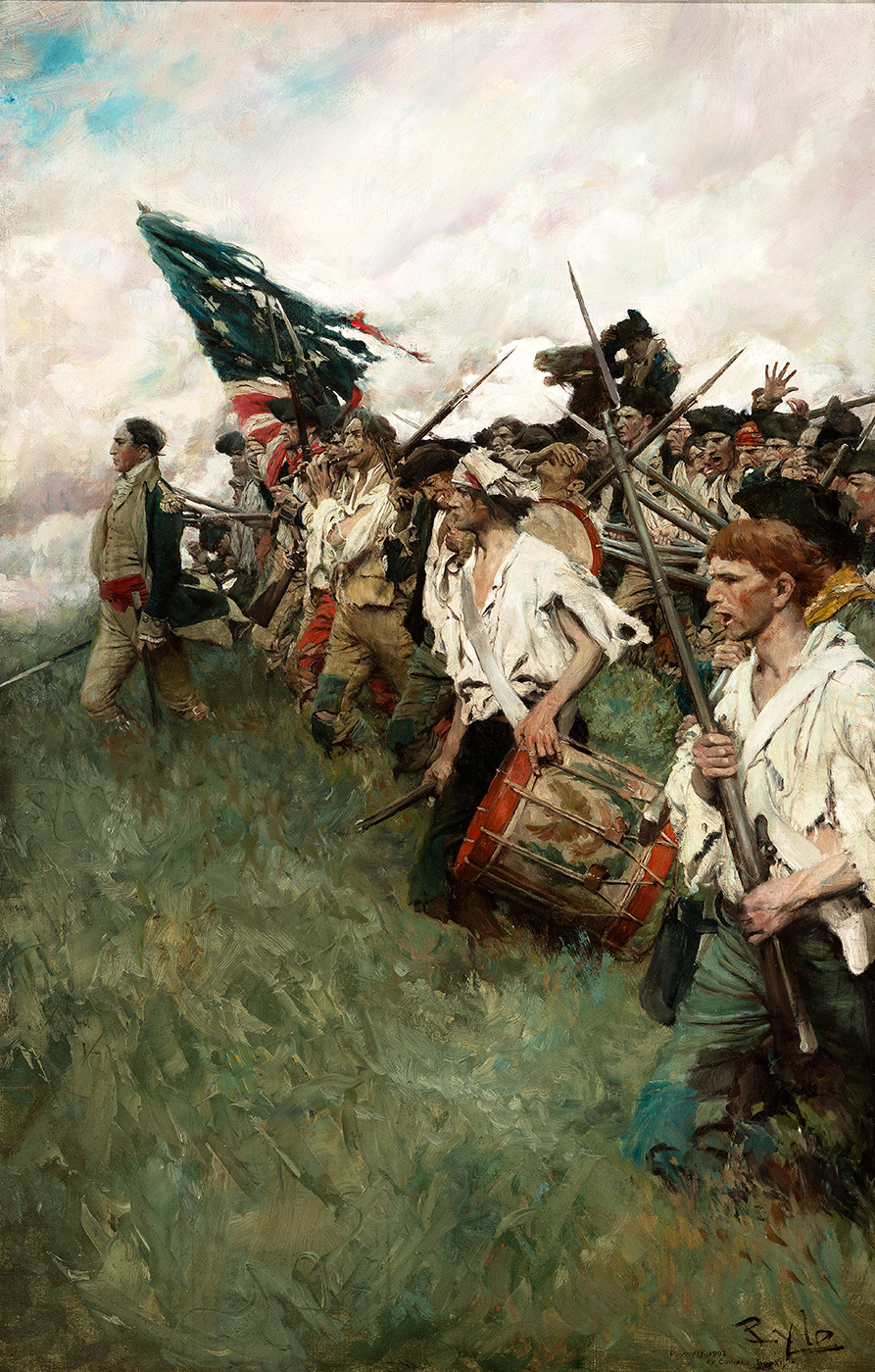
Nation Makers depicts a scene from the Battle of Brandywine, by Howard Pyle, a summer resident of Chadds Ford. The painting is displayed in the Brandywine River Museum.

The valley was settled by Quakers, and other dissident Protestants, following Penn's Charter. Their activities were mainly farming and milling. Quaker influence is still felt with over 16 Quaker Meetings and several Quaker schools operating in the area. The Quaker millers near the mouth of the Brandywine cooperated in maintaining quality and branding the flour. "Brandywine Superfine" flour was shipped all along the Atlantic coast and to the West Indies even before the American Revolution.

A base point for surveying the Mason–Dixon line, known as the Stargazers' Stone, was established in Embreeville 31 miles (50 km) west of Philadelphia and 15 miles (24 km) north of the Maryland-Pennsylvania border by Charles Mason and Jeremiah Dixon in 1764. They used the adjoining John Harlan house as their center of operations until 1768.

The creek lends its name to the 1777 Battle of Brandywine of the American Revolutionary War. General William Howe, commanding the British forces, was marching north on Baltimore Pike (now U.S. Route 1) toward Philadelphia and needed to ford the Brandywine near Chadds Ford. General George Washington, massed most of his American forces on the banks of the creek near Chadds Ford, and protected other fords as far as 5 miles (8.0 km) north and 3 miles (4.8 km) south. The Brandywine Battlefield Park covers only 50 acres (200,000 m^{2}), but during the battle British troops marched about 6 miles (9.7 km) north, fording the creek above the forks, to outflank Washington's forces.

Before the battle, General Anthony Wayne had his headquarters in Brandywine Village, across the creek from Wilmington, and Continental troops camped nearby, near Lovering Avenue. The poet Bayard Taylor wrote of the battle and the creek:

And once thy peaceful tide
Was filled with life-blood from bold hearts and brave;
and heroes on thy verdant margin died,
The land they loved, to save.

These vales, so calm and still,
Once saw the foeman's charge,—the bayonet's gleam;
And heard the thunders roll from hill to hill
From morn till sunset's beam.

Early paper mills were located along the creek, during the Revolution. They supplied Benjamin Franklin's print shop and also supplied the paper to print Continental currency and the Declaration of Independence.

The Conestoga wagon was first built to haul grain from the Conestoga Valley to Brandywine flour mills.

A group of painters, including N. C. Wyeth, Andrew Wyeth, Jamie Wyeth and Howard Pyle, are referred to as the "Brandywine School" especially for their landscape works which depict the Brandywine valley. Many of their works are on view at the Brandywine River Museum in Chadds Ford.

=== Brandywine Village and early industrialization ===
The Brandywine crosses the Fall Line just north of Wilmington. The elevation falls from about 160 feet (49 m) above sea level in Chadds Ford, to just a few feet above sea level in Wilmington. The steep descent powered many early industrial activities, including flour milling and the original DuPont gunpowder mills, while the navigable channel to the Delaware River and Delaware Bay allowed manufacturers to load ocean-going ships from near their mills.

By 1687, a Swedish colonist, Tyman Stidham opened the first mill on the Brandywine, near Wilmington. About 1735, Brandywine Village was founded across the creek from Wilmington. Quakers Elizabeth Levis Shipley, her husband William Shipley, and Thomas Canby were important in establishing the village and its supporting flour mills. By 1743, a dam and a millrace south of the creek had been built.

In 1760, a bridge was built at the current site of the Market Street Bridge, and the north race and two more flour mills were built by Joseph Tatnall.

Oliver Evans in the 1780s helped local mills increase their efficiency, ushering in the Industrial Revolution.

The first paper mill in Delaware, Gilpin's mill in north Wilmington, opened in 1787. This site was later used by one of the largest textile mills in the world, Bancroft Mills, which is now closed.

In 1796, the village contained 12 mills that could grind 400,000 bushels of grain per year.

By 1806, there were "about fifty or sixty snug brick, stone, and frame houses" in the village.

In 1795, Jacob Broom built the first cotton mill on the Brandywine, a few miles north of the village, but it burned down two years later. In 1802, Broom sold the site, complete with a working dam and millrace, to Eleuthère Irénée du Pont, who paid $6,740 for the 95 acres (380,000 m^{2}). Gunpowder mills, known as the Eleutherian Mills, operated on the site from 1802, and by 1810, the site was the largest gunpowder producer in the country. During the Civil War alone, over 4 million barrels of gunpowder were produced here. The mills, which operated until 1921, are now part of the Hagley Museum and Library.

By 1815, several toll roads connected the village with Pennsylvania's grain-growing regions, including the Lancaster, Kennett and Concord Pikes. These roads later became Delaware Route 41, Delaware Route 52, and parts of US 202 combined with Delaware Route 202.

The millers cooperated in maintaining quality and branding the flour. "Brandywine Superfine" flour was shipped all along the Atlantic coast and to the West Indies before the American Revolution.

A mill race once used to provide water power is still in working condition in Brandywine Park, designed in the 1890s by Frederick Law Olmsted, near downtown Wilmington.

To the north, Downingtown on the east branch was originally known as Milltown. Its first building, the Downingtown Log House, was built about 1700 where the road between Philadelphia and Lancaster, later known as the Lancaster Pike, crossed the east branch. Thomas Moore built a grist mill in 1716 and Roger Hunt built another in 1739, which operated through at least 1908. Both the Downingtown Log House and the Roger Hunt Mill still stand today.

Milltown was the halfway point on the journey between Philadelphia and Lancaster, so several inns served travelers, including the Ship Inn (c. 1730), the King-in-Armes or Washington Inn (1761), the Half-Way House (1790), and the Swan Hotel (1800).

In the 1880s, Downingtown became known for its paper mills.

Coatesville on the west branch became famous for producing iron goods as early as 1810, and later, rolling steel plate. Lukens Steel Company has dominated the economy of the town since 1810; today, Cleveland Cliffs continues to make steel there.

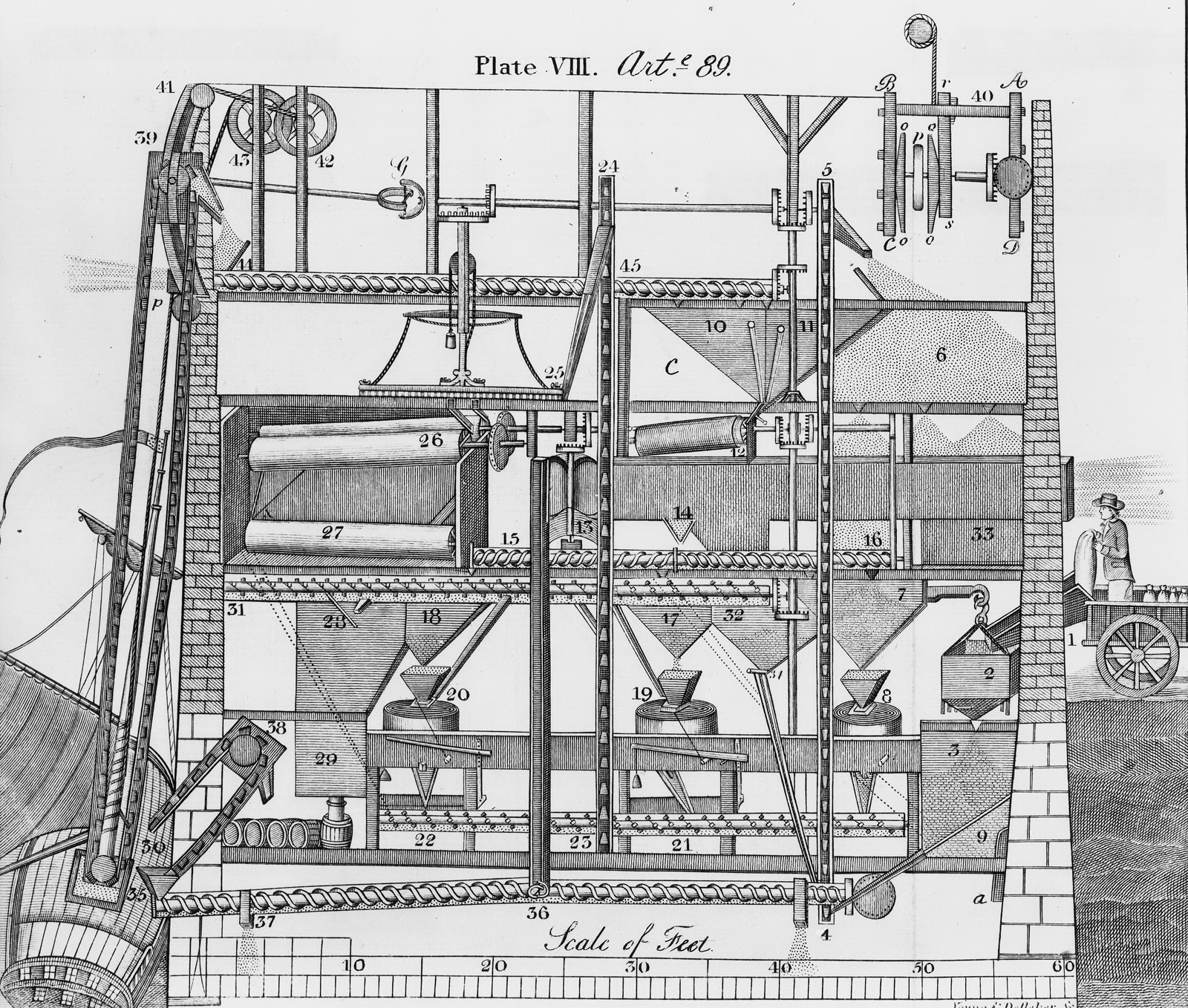
Oliver Evans's design for automated flour milling

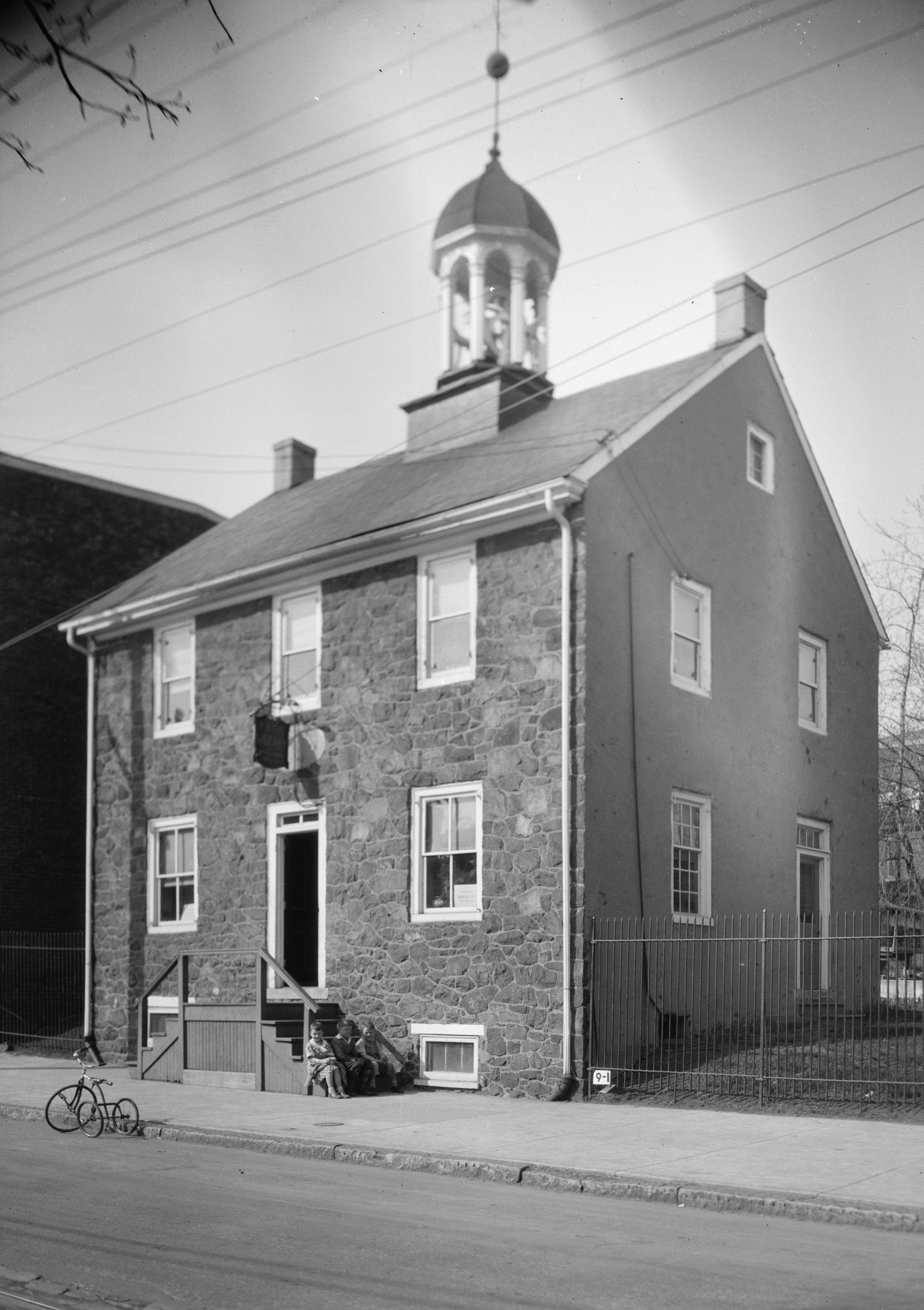
The Brandywine Academy building

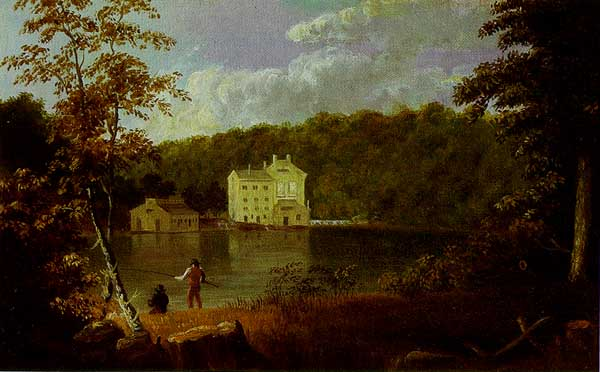
Gilpin's Mill on the Brandywine, attributed to Thomas Doughty c. 1827

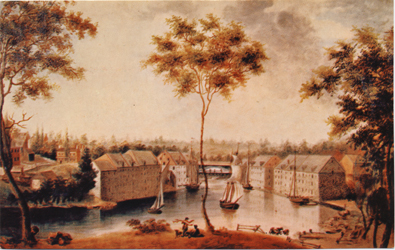
Brandywine flour mills about 1840, painted by Bass Otis. The north bank (to the right) is Brandywine Village.

=== Historic preservation ===
These places near the Brandywine are on the National Register of Historic Places.

Site	Address	Listed
Fort Christina	E. 7th Street, Wilmington, Delaware; Near mouth of creek 39°44′14″N 75°32′18″W	1961, 1966
Old Swedes Church	E. 7th Street at Church Street; 39°44′18″N 75°32′26″W	1961, 1966
Dr. John A. Brown House	4 7th Ave; 39°44′6″N 75°31′31″W	1966
Howard High School	13th Street at Poplar Street; 39°44′48″N 75°32′30″W	1985
Brandywine Village	North and east of Market Street Bridge; 39°45′06″N 75°32′33″W	1971, 1976
Baynard Boulevard Historic District	Baynard Blvd. between 18th St. and Concord Ave; 39°45′29″N 75°32′41″W	1979
Brandywine Park	North of Market Street Bridge to Augustine Bridge; 39°45′18″N 75°33′00″W	1976
Old First Presbyterian Church of Wilmington	West Street at Brandywine Park Drive; 39°45′03″N 75°32′52″W	1972
Continental Army Encampment Site	Lovering Avenue, near Broom Street; 39°45′30″N 75°33′21″W	1972
Augustine Paper Mill	N. Brandywine Park Dr. 39°45′43″N 75°33′25″W	1978
Bancroft Mills	Rockford Road at the Brandywine; 39°46′07″N 75°33′57″W	1984
Rockford Park	West of Rockford Road, south of creek 39°46′03″N 75°34′18″W	1978
Brandywine Manufacturers Sunday School	North of Wilmington on Hagley Rd. 39°46′45″N 75°34′34″W	1972
Eleutherian Mills	Rt. 141 at Brandywine Creek Bridge; 39°46′29″N 75°34′42″W	1966
Brandywine Powder Mills District	Rt. 141 at the Brandywine; 39°46′48″N 75°34′40″W	1984
Breck's Mill Area	Breck's Lane and Creek Rd. 39°46′14″N 75°34′56″W	1971
Rockland Historic District	Rockland, DE; 39°47′50″N 75°34′19″W	1972
N.C. Wyeth House and Studio	Murphy Rd. near Creek Road, Chadds Ford, Pennsylvania; 39°52′05″N 75°35′10″W	1979
Chadds Ford Historic District	U.S. Route 1 at Creek Road, Chadds Ford, Pennsylvania; 39°52′19″N 75°35′28″W	1971
Brandywine Battlefield	U.S. Route 1 east of Brandywine Creek, Chadds Ford, Pennsylvania; 39°52′31″N 75°34′31″W	1966
Brinton's Mill	Creek Road, north of Chadds Ford; 39°53′10″N 75°36′30″W	1971
Lenape Bridge	Rt 52 at Creek Road, Lenape; 39°54′53″N 75°37′48″W	1982
Gibson's Covered Bridge	East Branch; US 322 and Harmony Hill Rd, west of West Chester; 39°58′34″N 75°40′58″W	1971
Downingtown Log House	15 E. Lancaster Ave., Downingtown, Pennsylvania on East Branch Brandywine Creek; 40°00′23″N 75°42′15″W	1979
Roger Hunt Mill	Race Street, Downingtown, PA; 40°00′30″N 75°42′39″W	1979
Embreeville Historic District	West Branch; Rt. 162 at Cannery Rd. 39°55′38″N 75°43′50″W	1985
Coatesville Historic District	1st–6th Streets and East Lincoln Highway at West Branch Brandywine Creek, Coatesville, Pennsylvania; 39°58′58″N 75°49′21″W	1987
Brandywine Building and Loan Assoc. Rowhouses	Hephzibah Hill Rd, Coatesville, PA; 39°57′27″N 75°48′19″W	

About 1905, looking downstream toward Van Buren Street Bridge, Wilmington. Note the mill race on the right.

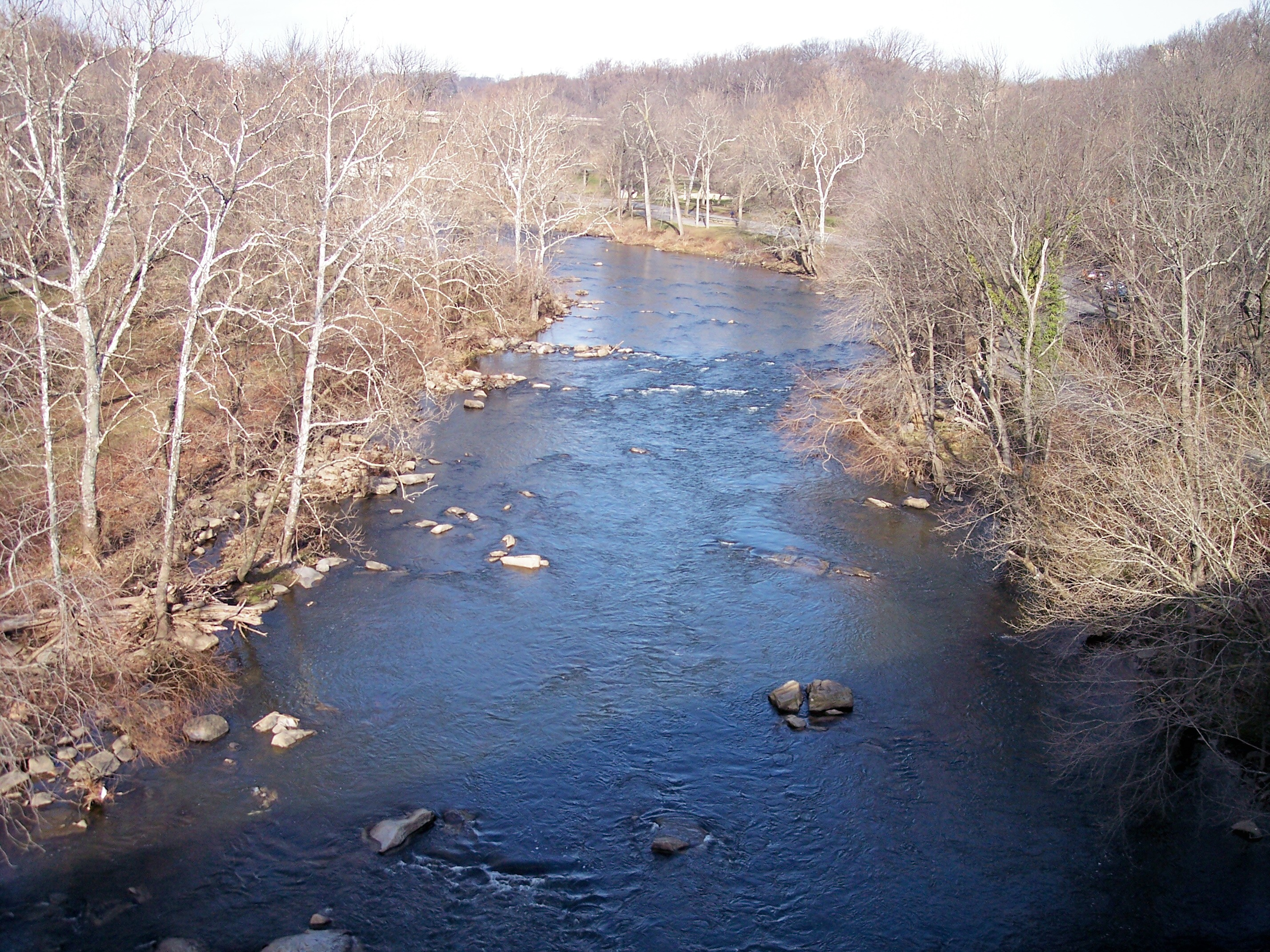
Brandywine Creek in Wilmington in 2006

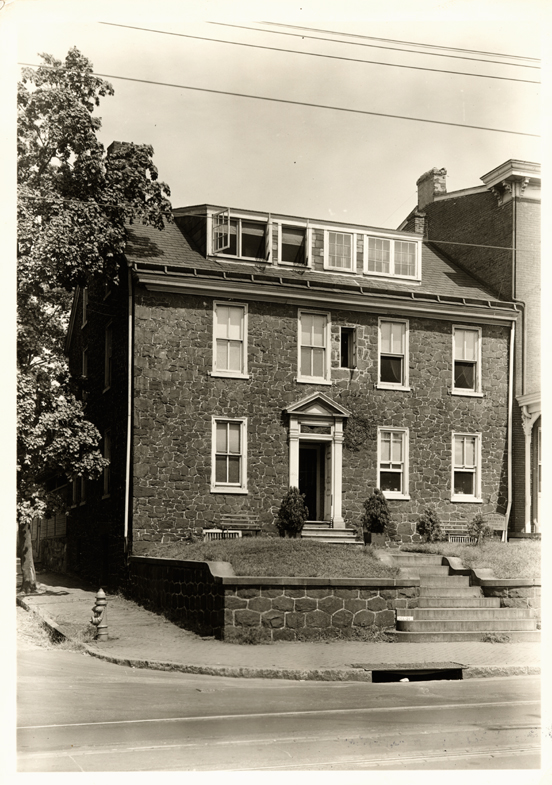
William Lea house in Brandywine Village

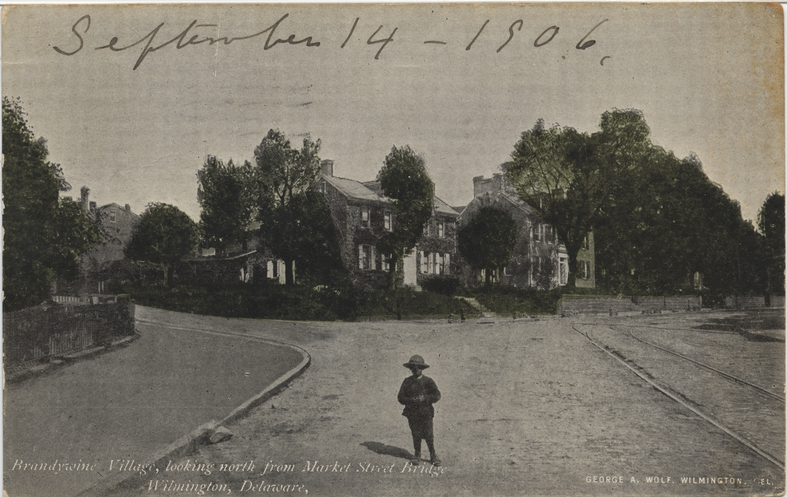
Brandywine Village from the Market Street Bridge from a postcard dated 1906

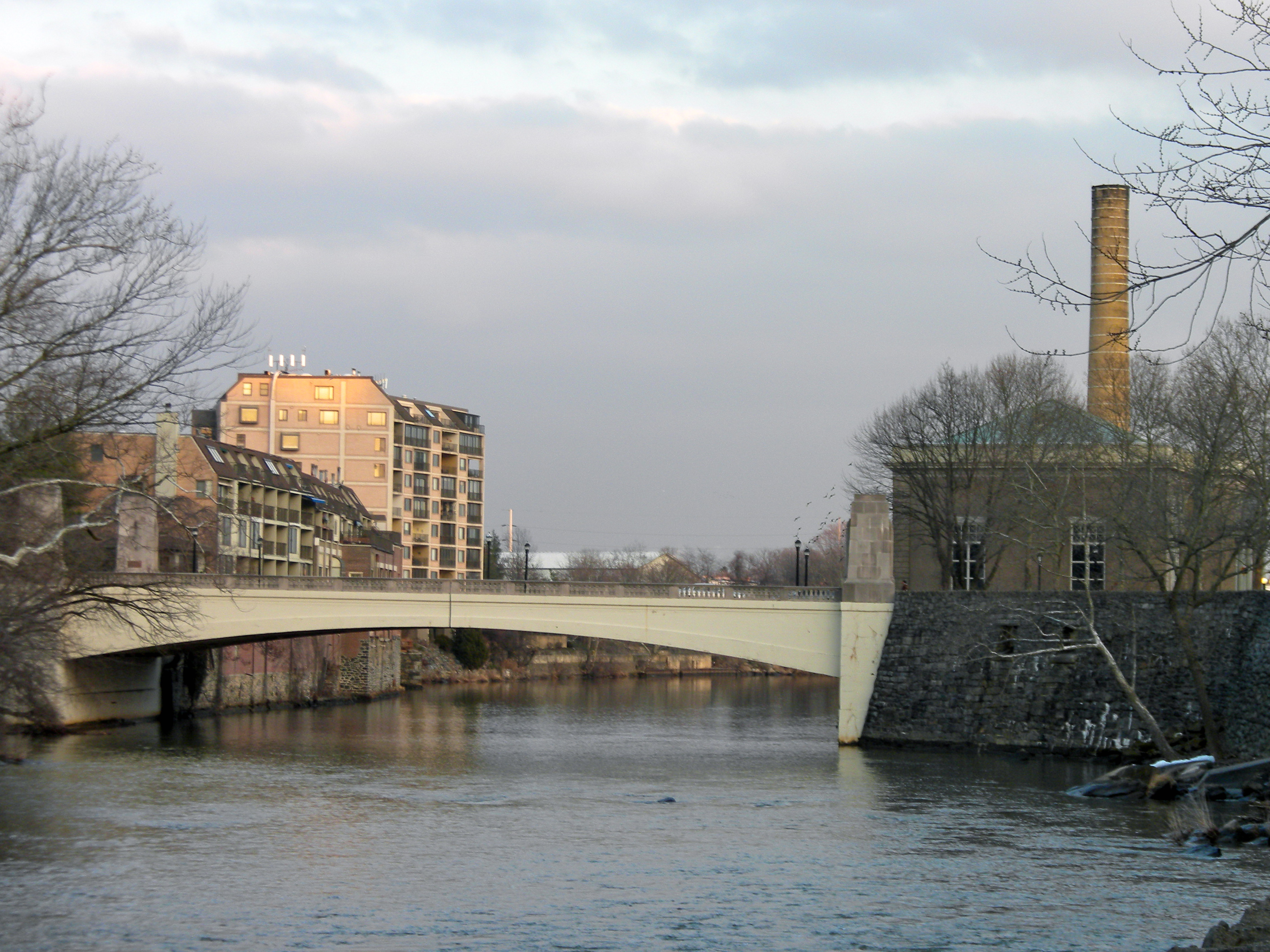
Market Street Bridge, looking downstream, with Brandywine Village on the left, and the Wilmington Pumping Station on the right. The bridge marks the approximate high level of tidewater on the Brandywine.

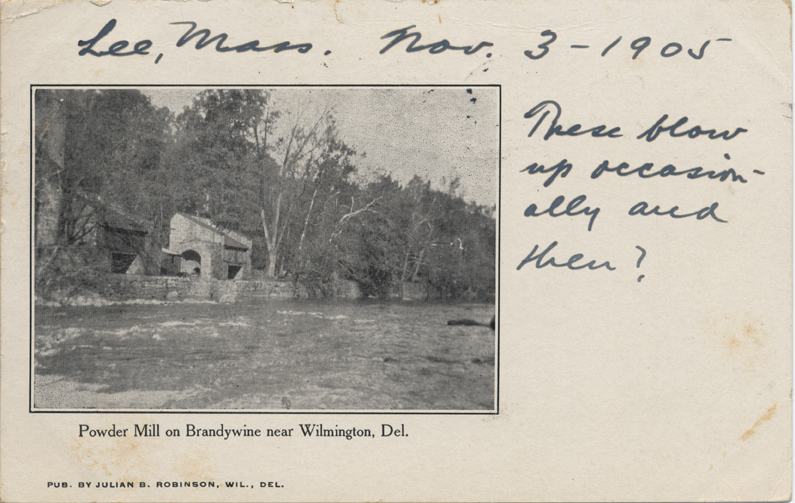
DuPont gunpowder mills on the Brandywine, on a postcard dated 1905. These mills were still working at the time. Note the handwritten "These blow up occasionally, and then?"

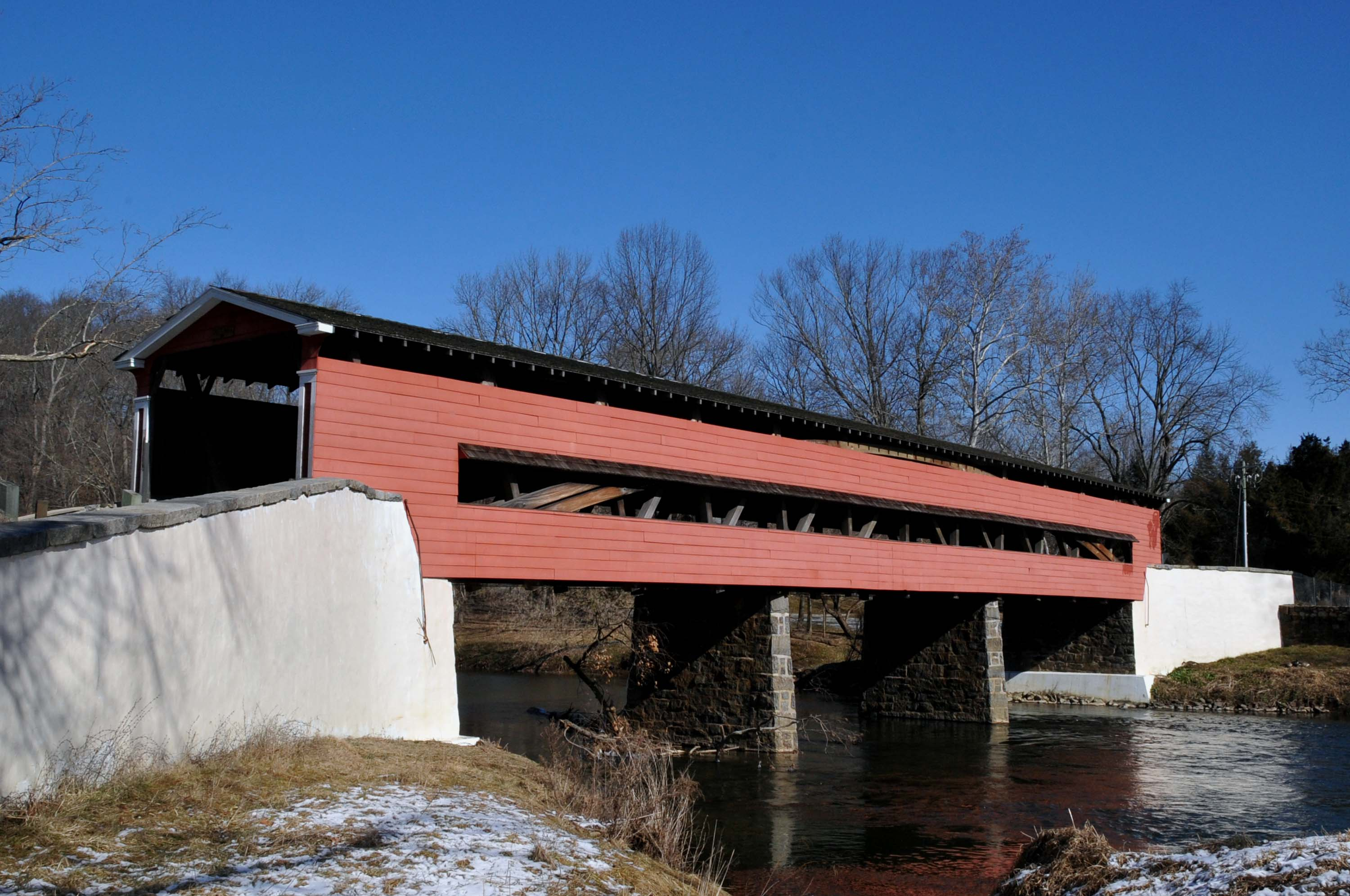
Smith's Covered Bridge

== Dam Removal ==
Several dams block passage to American shad (Alosa sapidissima) spawning runs which cannot access the Pennsylvania reaches of the river. All 11 of Delaware’s Brandywine dams are on the river between miles 2.1 and 7.2. They are relatively small dams, all less than 10-feet. The first dam on Brandywine Creek to be removed was in 2019, enabling shad to migrate further up the river. In 2025, a second dam was removed at DuPont Experimental Station Dam. The plan to remove all eight dams is known as "Brandywine Shad 2020" and has been led by Professor Jerry Kauffman of the University of Delaware Water Resources Center.

== See also ==
- Bancroft Mills
- Brandywine Battlefield
- Brandywine Valley Railroad
- Chaddsford Winery
- East Branch Brandywine Creek
- Eleutherian Mills
- Forks of the Brandywine Presbyterian Church
- Longwood Gardens
- Nemours Mansion and Gardens
- Preston Lea
- Rockland, Delaware
- William Lea
- West Branch Brandywine Creek
- Wilmington State Parks
- List of Delaware rivers
- List of rivers of Pennsylvania
