= William Young House =

Historic house in Delaware, United States

- U.S. National Register of Historic Places
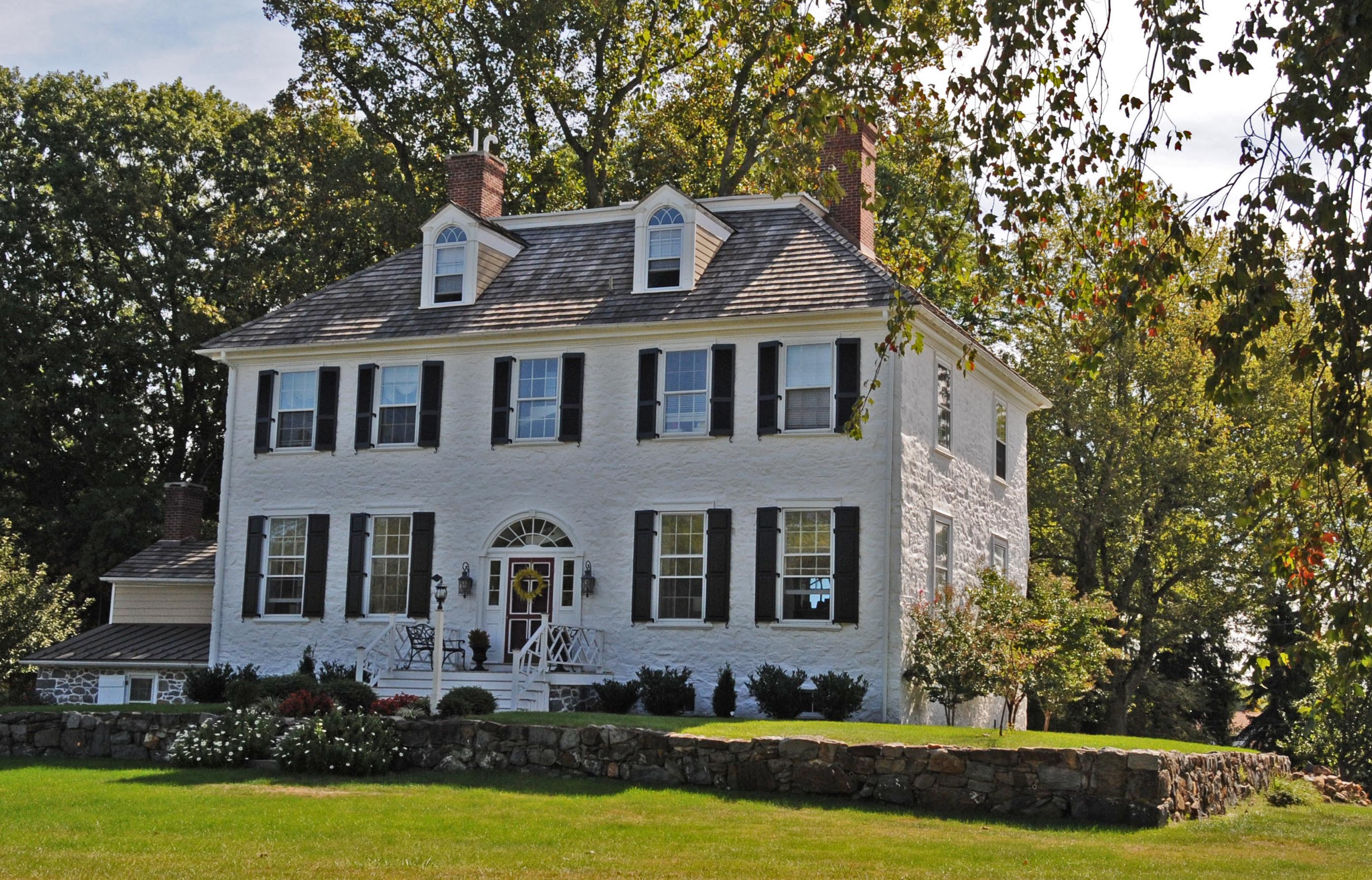

- Location within Delaware Location within the United States
- Location: 507 Black Gates Rd., near Rockland, Delaware
- Coordinates: 39.79465°N 75.56461°W
- Area: 1.1 acres (0.45 ha)
- Built: 1802
- Architectural style: Early Republic
- NRHP reference No.: 82001029
- Added to NRHP: October 29, 1982

William Young House is a historic home located near Rockland, New Castle County, Delaware. The house was added to the National Register of Historic Places in 1982.

It is just uphill from the Rockland Historic District, on Black Gates Road across from the DuPont Country Club in Woodbrook Standing alone facing west toward Rockland proper, and surrounded on three sides by a raised terrace with a stone wall, the William Young House is an imposing structure with a high degree of architectural integrity. It was built in 1802, and is a two-story, five-bay, stone dwelling with a hipped roof and in the Georgian style. The main block measures 50 feet (15 m) by 34 feet (10 m), with a kitchen ell measuring 26 feet (7.9 m) by 28 feet (8.5 m). The exterior is masonry; presently it is whitewashed, although there is evidence that it was originally intended to be stuccoed. In her book Reminiscences of Wilmington, Elizabeth Montgomery recalled fondly Mr Young and his endeavors, "a fine mansion was also put up in the last century, and improvements made from year to year".

The William Young House is architecturally significant as a fine example of the late High Georgian style in Northern Delaware, built at the beginning of the 19th century at medium scale and in a somewhat rustic uncoursed local stone. Its historical significance lies in the use of a hilltop site and a homely but moderately pretentious style to express the status of mill owner William Young; hence, in the preservation of one facet of the early industrial life of the Brandywine Valley. In W. Barksdale Maynard's book, The Brandywine: An Intimate Portrait, the house is referred to as such, "Young's stately Federal-style home still stands uphill on Black Gates Road, a reminder of the wealth that early industrialization brought. It is surrounded by modern developments and a country club".

Its builder, William Young, was the owner of the paper and textile mills at the focus of the Rockland Historic District. William Young, originally from Irvine, Ayrshire, Scotland, moved to Philadelphia in 1784. There he did business as a book seller and publisher in a shop on Second and Chestnut street, not far from Independence hall. He then moved on to a new business as a paper maker in Rockland, De, in about 1794. He did very well at the paper making trade. Receiving a medal from the Philadelphia Company of Booksellers, for his success in making paper from mulberry root. In 1813 Young created " the adjacent Delaware Woolen Company mill for making blue cassimere (suit cloth) and working coarse wools into satin-like fabric", and a year later when the paper mill burned down, he shifted his focus to being primarily a textiles mill. In 1822 they began processing cotton at the new cotton mill known as the Wallace Cotton Factory, named for Young's son William Wallace. Around a similar time he founded the Rockland Manufacturing Company, which his sons William Wallace and Evan took over. Later the mills, on this the east bank of the Brandywine at Rockland, came to be under the owner ship of Jessup and Moore in the 1860s, and later San-Nap-Pak Manufacturing Co. (later renamed Doeskin) in the early 1900s. The site of the original Young mill is now part of Brandywine Creek State Park.

List of owners of the home through the Young Family:

- William Young
- William Henton Young
- Edward Harper Buckley
- Samuel Martin Broadbent
- William Bruce Castor
- William Stanley Castor
- William Stanley Castor II
