= Husbands Run =

Stream in Delaware, USA

Husbands Run Tributary to Brandywine Creek
- Location of Husbands Run mouth

Location
- Country: United States
- State: Delaware
- County: New Castle

Physical characteristics
- Source: divide between Brandywine Creek and Shellpot Creek
  - location: Talleyville, Delaware
  - coordinates: 39°48′17″N 075°33′06″W
  - elevation: 360 ft (110 m)
- Mouth: Brandywine Creek
  - location: Wilmington, Delaware
  - coordinates: 39°46′55″N 075°34′12″W
  - elevation: 110 ft (34 m)
- Length: 1.71 mi (2.75 km)
- Basin size: 1.53 square miles (4.0 km^{2})
- Discharge
  - location: Brandywine Creek
  - average: 2.35 cu ft/s (0.067 m^{3}/s) at mouth with Brandywine Creek

Basin features
- Progression: southwest
- River system: Christina River
- Tributaries
  - left: Willow Run
  - right: unnamed tributaries

Husbands Run is a 1.71 mi (2.75 km) long tributary to Brandywine Creek in New Castle County, Delaware north of Wilmington, Delaware. It rises in Woodley Park between the Tavistock Woodbrook, Sharpley and Edenridge neighborhoods. It flows through DuPont Country Club, where it is joined by the Willow Run and mouths north of Delaware Route 141. The Husbands were early settlers to the region.

== See also ==
- List of Delaware rivers
