= Woodbrook, Delaware =

Unincorporated community in Delaware, United States

- Unincorporated community
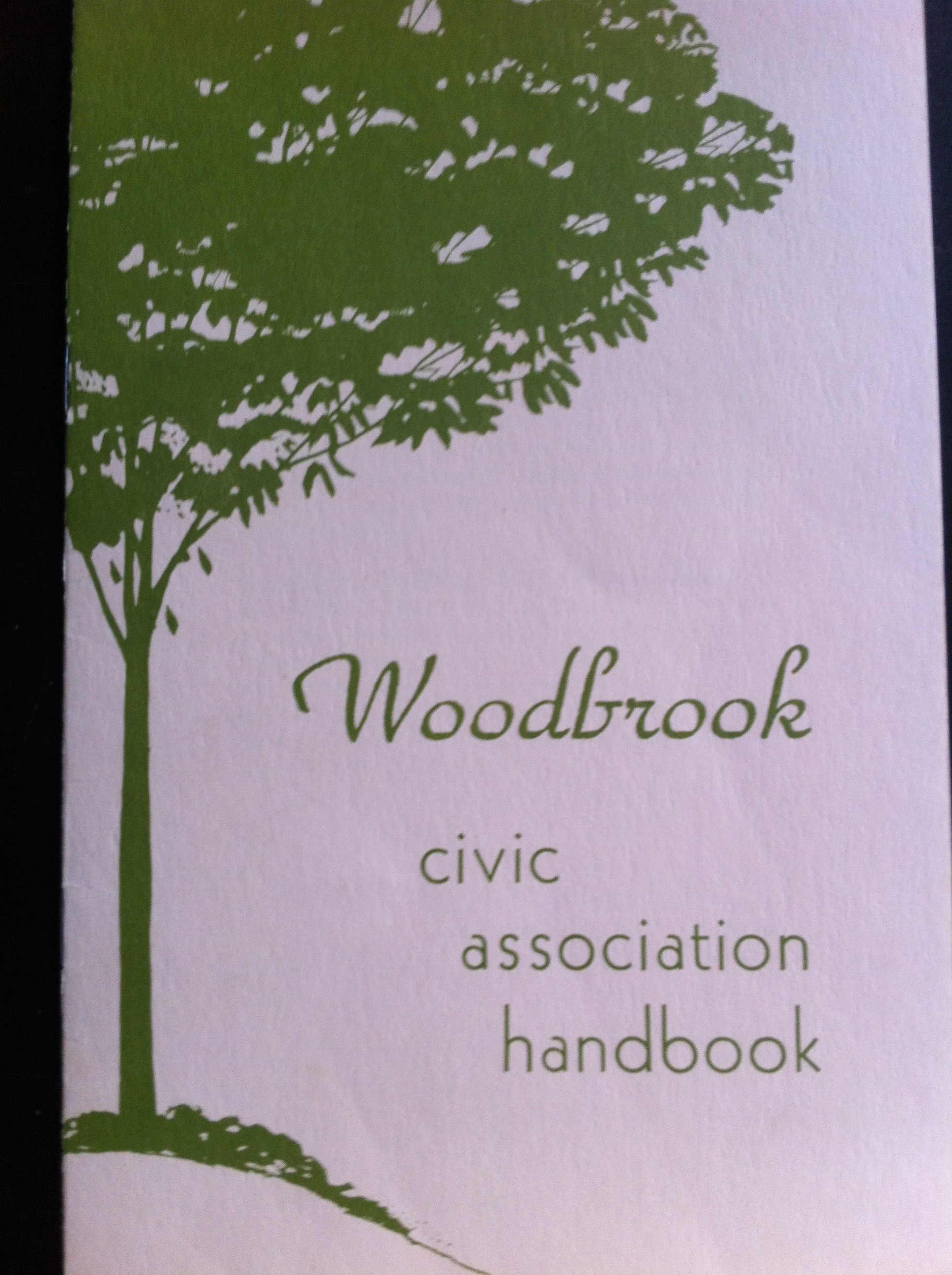
- Woodbrook Civic Association

- Location within Delaware Location within the United States
- Coordinates: 39°47′38″N 75°33′29″W
- Country: United States
- State: Delaware
- County: New Castle
- Elevation: 338 ft (103 m)
- Time zone: UTC-5 (Eastern (EST))
  - Summer (DST): UTC-4 (EDT)
- ZIP Code: 19803
- Area code: 302
- GNIS feature ID: 217094

Woodbrook is a suburban community in New Castle County, Delaware.

== Geography ==
Woodbrook is approximately three miles north of Wilmington and is part of unincorporated Brandywine Hundred of New Castle County, west of Concord Pike (U.S. Route 202) and east of Brandywine Creek State Park. It is adjacent to DuPont Country Club.

The William Young House is located in the neighborhood, the land on which is sited set aside for the historic monument during the final subdivision in 1959.

Husbands Run and its tributary Willow Run flow through the neighborhood.

== History ==
Woodbrook was planned as early as 1948. It is a deed-restricted planned community of 215 single-family homes, developed beginning in 1952 by Woodlawn Trustees, an organization set up by conservationist William Poole Bancroft to preserve open land around the Brandywine River and to provide affordable housing. Neighboring Sharpley, Edenridge and Tavistock are also Woodlawn communities.

The Woodbrook Civic Association was established on January 25, 1962.

== Notable people ==
- Laura Sturgeon, politician
