= Rocky Run (Brandywine Creek tributary) =

Stream in Delaware, USA

Rocky Run Tributary to Brandywine Creek
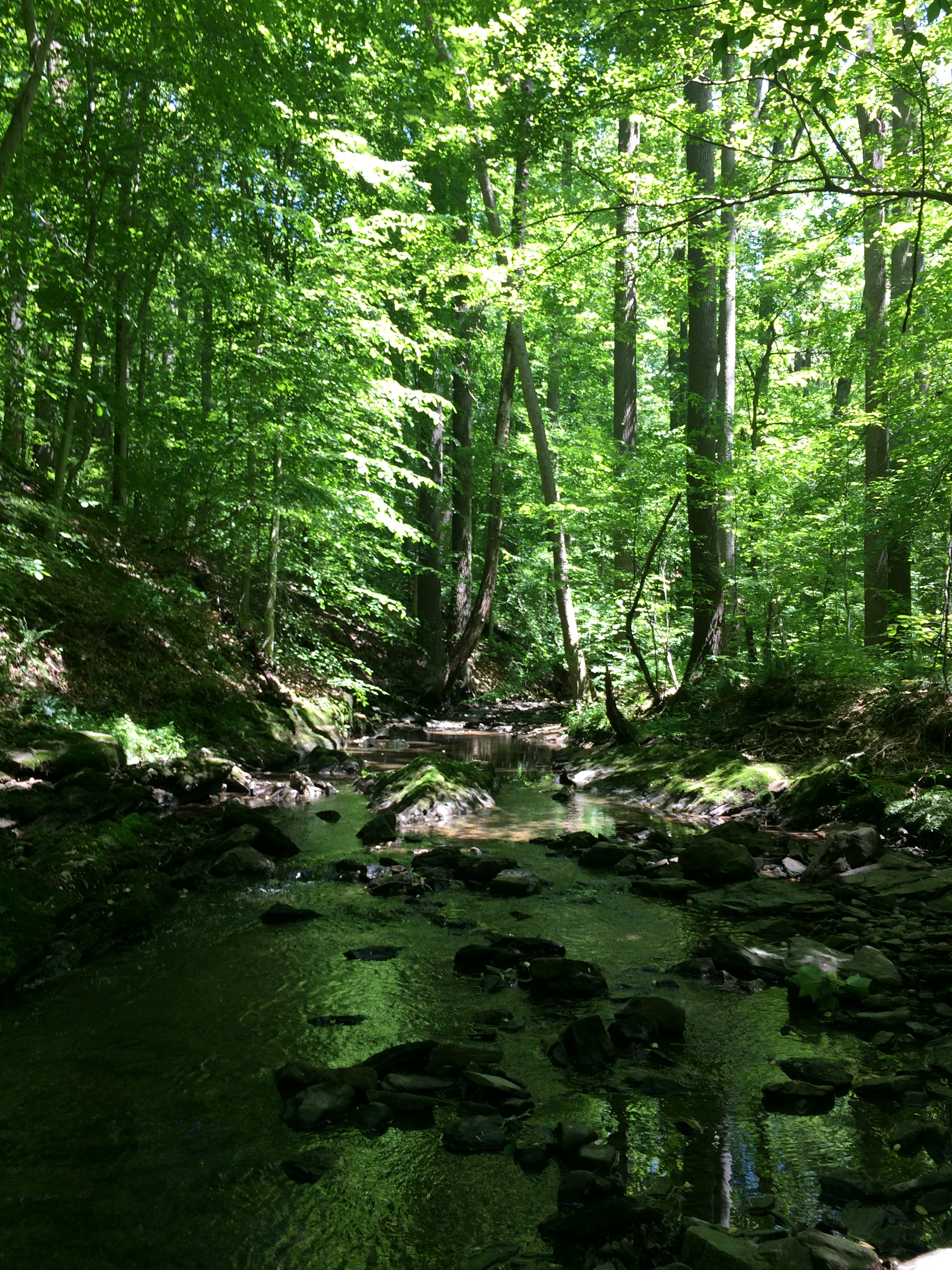
- Rocky Run in New Castle County, Delaware

- Location of Rocky Run mouth Rocky Run (Brandywine Creek tributary) (the United States)

Location
- Country: United States
- State: Delaware
- County: New Castle

Physical characteristics
- Source: South Branch Naamans Creek divide
  - location: Devonshire, Delaware
  - coordinates: 39°49′30″N 075°32′01″W
  - elevation: 380 ft (120 m)
- Mouth: Brandywine Creek
  - location: about 0.25 miles northwest of Tavistock, Delaware
  - coordinates: 39°48′40″N 075°33′59″W
  - elevation: 135 ft (41 m)
- Length: 2.30 mi (3.70 km)
- Basin size: 1.67 square miles (4.3 km^{2})
- Discharge
  - location: Brandywine Creek
  - average: 2.65 cu ft/s (0.075 m^{3}/s) at mouth with Brandywine Creek

Basin features
- Progression: west-southwest
- River system: Delaware River
- Tributaries
  - left: unnamed tributaries
  - right: Hurricane Run
- Bridges: Shipley Road, Tunison Drive, Rockfield Drive S, US 202

Rocky Run is a stream in northern New Castle County, Delaware. The stream flows for several miles through Brandywine Creek State Park and part of First State National Historical Park before feeding the larger Brandywine Creek. Rocky Run itself is fed by Hurricane Run, also located in Brandywine Creek State Park.

== Course ==
Rocky Run rises in Devonshire, Delaware in Devon Park and then flows west-southwest to join Brandywine Creek about 0.25 miles northwest of Tavistock.

== Watershed ==
Rocky Run drains 1.67 square miles (4.3 km^{2}) of area, receives about 47.8 in/year of precipitation, has a topographic wetness index of 477.25 and is about 31% forested.

== See also ==
- List of rivers of Delaware
