= William Hicklen House =

Historic house in Delaware, US

- U.S. National Register of Historic Places
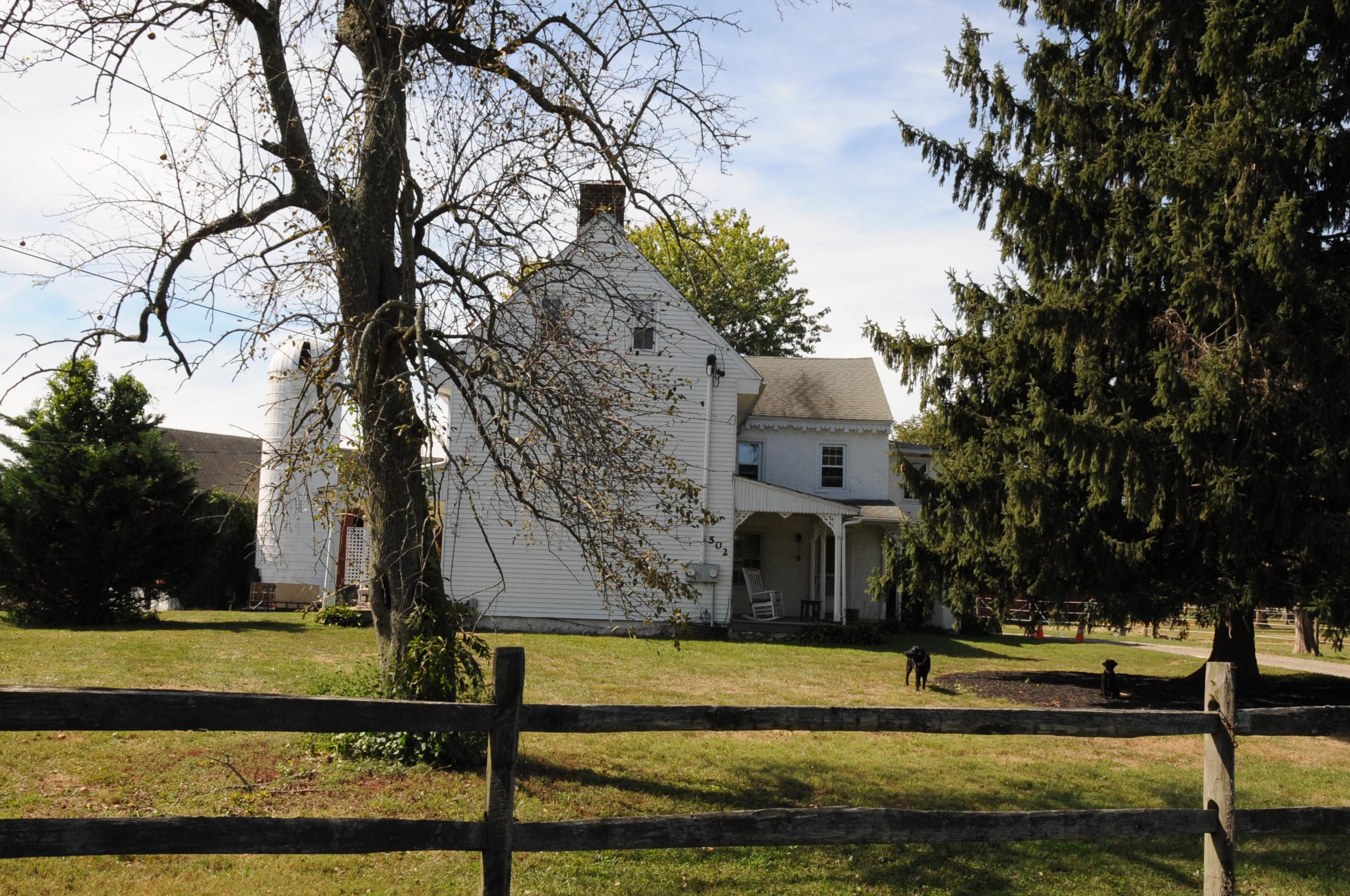

- Location within Delaware Location within the United States
- Location: 502 Beaver Valley Rd.
- Nearest city: Talleyville, Delaware
- Coordinates: 39.832012°N 75.556040°W
- Area: 27 acres (11 ha)
- Built: 1725
- NRHP reference No.: 83003519
- Added to NRHP: October 6, 1983

The William Hicklen House is a historic house at 502 Beaver Valley Road in Talleyville, Delaware, United States. The house is a rare 18th-century plank-frame house, built by an early settler of the area. A stone wing was added to the house prior to 1800, and it was further enlarged in the 19th century.

The house was listed on the National Register of Historic Places in 1983.

== See also ==
- National Register of Historic Places listings in northern New Castle County, Delaware
