= Willow Run (Husbands Run tributary) =

Stream in Delaware, USA

Willow Run Tributary to Husbands Run
- Location of Willow Run mouth Willow Run (Husbands Run tributary) (the United States)

Location
- Country: United States
- State: Delaware
- County: New Castle

Physical characteristics
- Source: Shellpot Creek divide
  - location: Sharpley, Delaware
  - coordinates: 39°47′55″N 075°32′59″W
  - elevation: 338 ft (103 m)
- Mouth: Husbands Run
  - location: about 0.5 miles east of Fairfax, Delaware
  - coordinates: 39°47′14″N 075°33′39″W
  - elevation: 285 ft (87 m)
- Discharge
  - location: Husbands Run

Basin features
- Progression: southwest
- River system: Delaware River
- Tributaries
  - left: unnamed tributaries
  - right: unnamed tributaries
- Bridges: Sharpley Road, Country Club Drive

Willow Run is a 1st order tributary to Husbands Run in New Castle County, Delaware.

== Course ==
Willow Run rises in Sharpley, Delaware, and then flows southwest through Woodbrook and the DuPont Country Club, where it joins Husbands Run about 0.5 miles east of Fairfax.

== See also ==
- List of Delaware rivers
