= Brandywine Manufacturers Sunday School =

- U.S. National Register of Historic Places
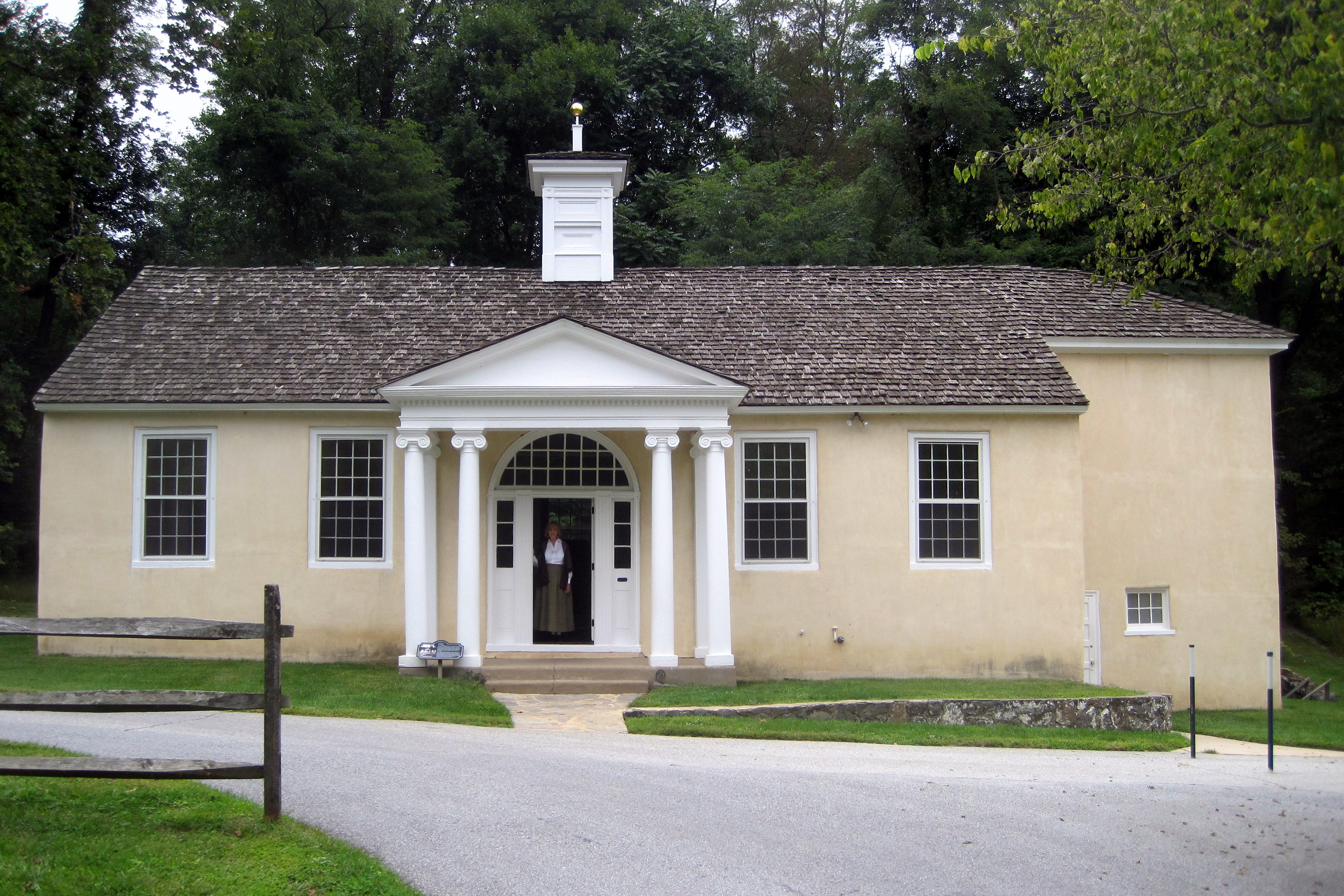
- Brandywine Manufacturers Sunday School on Workers' Hill at Hagley Museum, Blacksmith Hill Rd. Wilmington

- Location within Delaware Location within the United States
- Location: North of Wilmington on Hagley Rd., near Wilmington, Delaware
- Coordinates: 39°46′44″N 75°34′35″W
- Area: less than one acre
- Built: 1817
- NRHP reference No.: 72000291
- Added to NRHP: April 13, 1972

Brandywine Manufacturers Sunday School, also known as Sunday School and Hagley Office, is a historic Sunday school building located near Wilmington in New Castle County, Delaware, United States. It was built in 1817, and is a one-story, rectangular stone building. It measures 31 feet by 65 feet and features an Ionic order columned portico and school bell tower. Also on the property is a contributing spring house. It was built for workers, old and young, to learn the basics of reading, writing, and "ciphering," and remained in use as a school until 1851. From 1902 to 1921, it was the Hagley Yard office of DuPont. It was then converted to a private dwelling.

It was added to the National Register of Historic Places in 1972.
