= Dr. John A. Brown House =

Historic house in Delaware, United States

- U.S. National Register of Historic Places
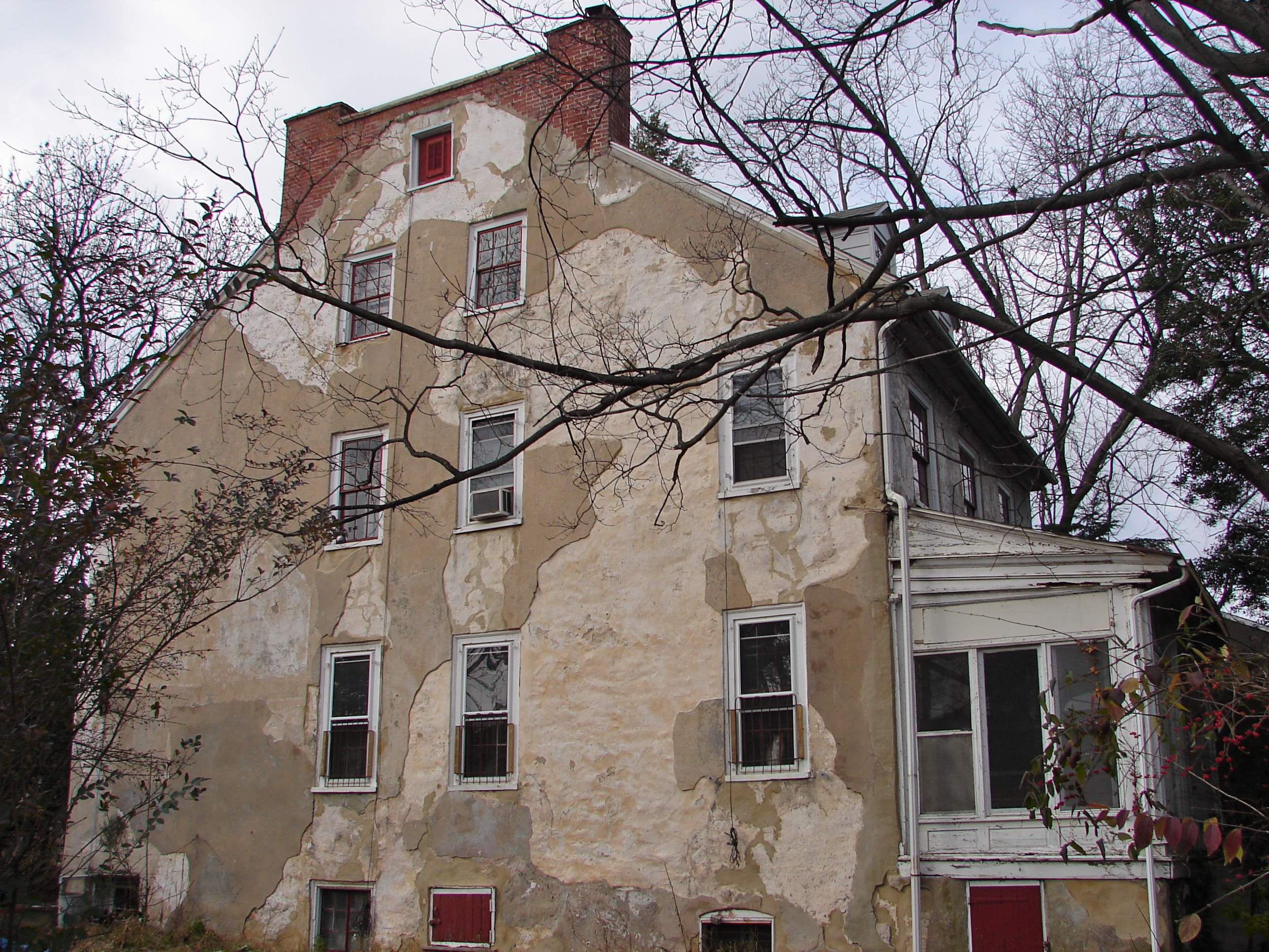
- Dr. John A. Brown House, December 2010

- Location within Delaware Location within the United States
- Location: 4 7th Ave., Wilmington, Delaware
- Coordinates: 39°44′6″N 75°31′31″W
- Area: 1 acre (0.40 ha)
- Built: c. 1820
- Architectural style: Italian Villa, Federal
- NRHP reference No.: 79000632
- Added to NRHP: April 24, 1979

Dr. John A. Brown House, also known as the "Anchorage", is a historic home located at 4 7th Avenue, Wilmington, New Castle County, Delaware. It was built in three phases. The core is a 2 1/2-story, three-bay, side-hall plan, quarried granite dwelling with late Federal detailing. It dates to the 1820s. Attached to the core is a brick kitchen wing. Two square multiple-story brick Italian Villa towers were added to the north gable end later in the 19th century. Also added at this time were the stucco exterior and a columned porch.

It was added to the National Register of Historic Places in 1979.
