= Mount Lebanon Methodist Episcopal Church =

Historic church in Delaware, United States

- U.S. National Register of Historic Places
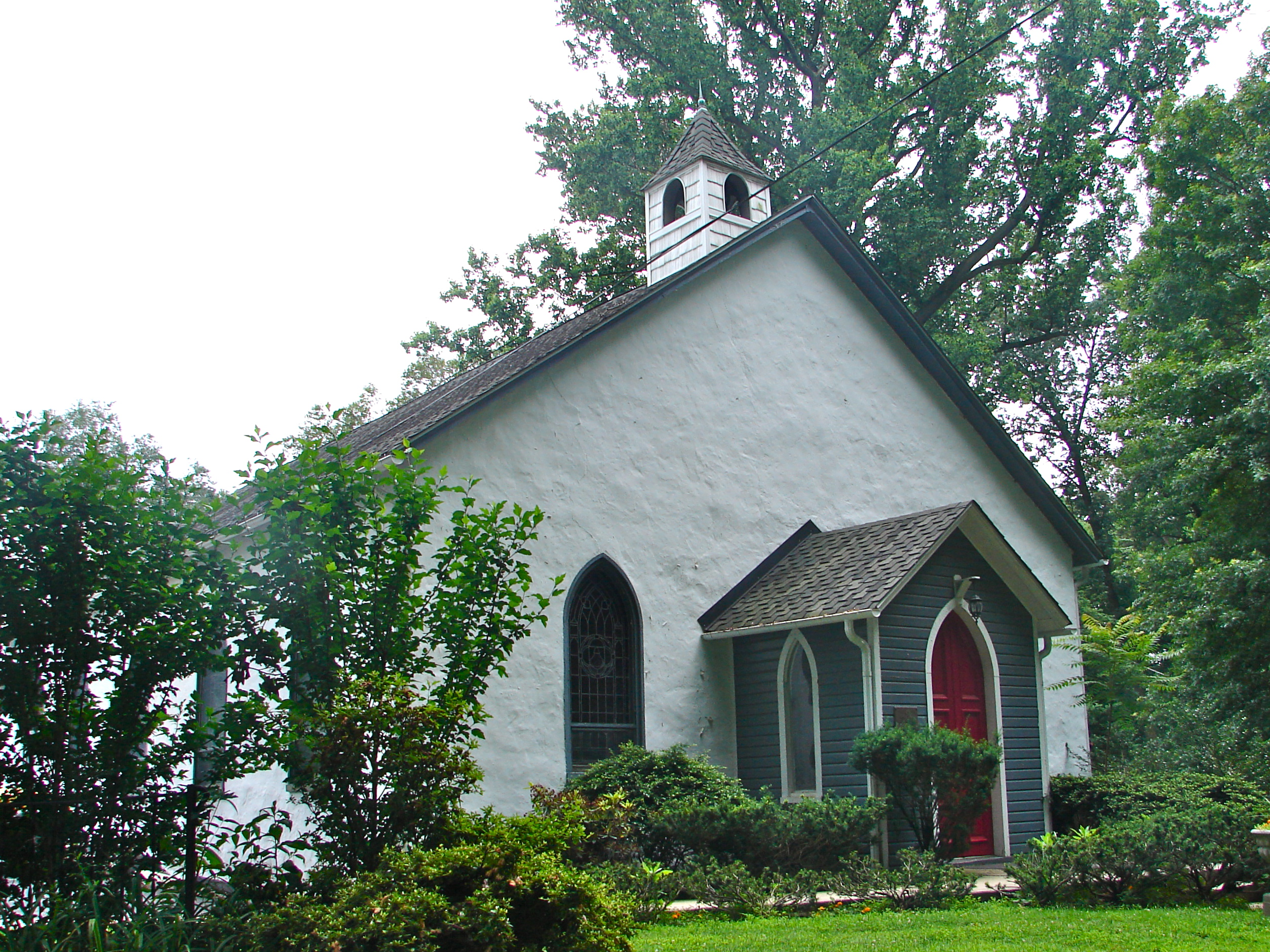
- Mount Lebanon Methodist Episcopal Church, June 2011

- Location within Delaware Location within the United States
- Location: 850 Mount Lebanon Rd., Wilmington, Delaware
- Coordinates: 39.79862°N 75.56785°W
- Area: 3 acres (1.2 ha)
- Built: 1834
- Architectural style: Late Gothic Revival
- NRHP reference No.: 84000845
- Added to NRHP: May 03, 1984

Mount Lebanon Methodist Episcopal Church, also known as Mount Lebanon United Methodist Church, is a historic Methodist Episcopal church located at 850 Mount Lebanon Road in Wilmington, New Castle County, Delaware. It was built in 1834, and is a stuccoed stone structure in a Late Gothic Revival style. It measures 60 by 40 feet (18 by 12 m), and has a steep gable roof and frame vestibule added in 1873. Adjacent to the church is a contributing cemetery containing approximately 150 tombstones dating from 1840.

The church was added to the National Register of Historic Places in 1984.
