= William Talley House (New Castle County, Delaware) =

Historic house in Delaware, United States

- U.S. National Register of Historic Places
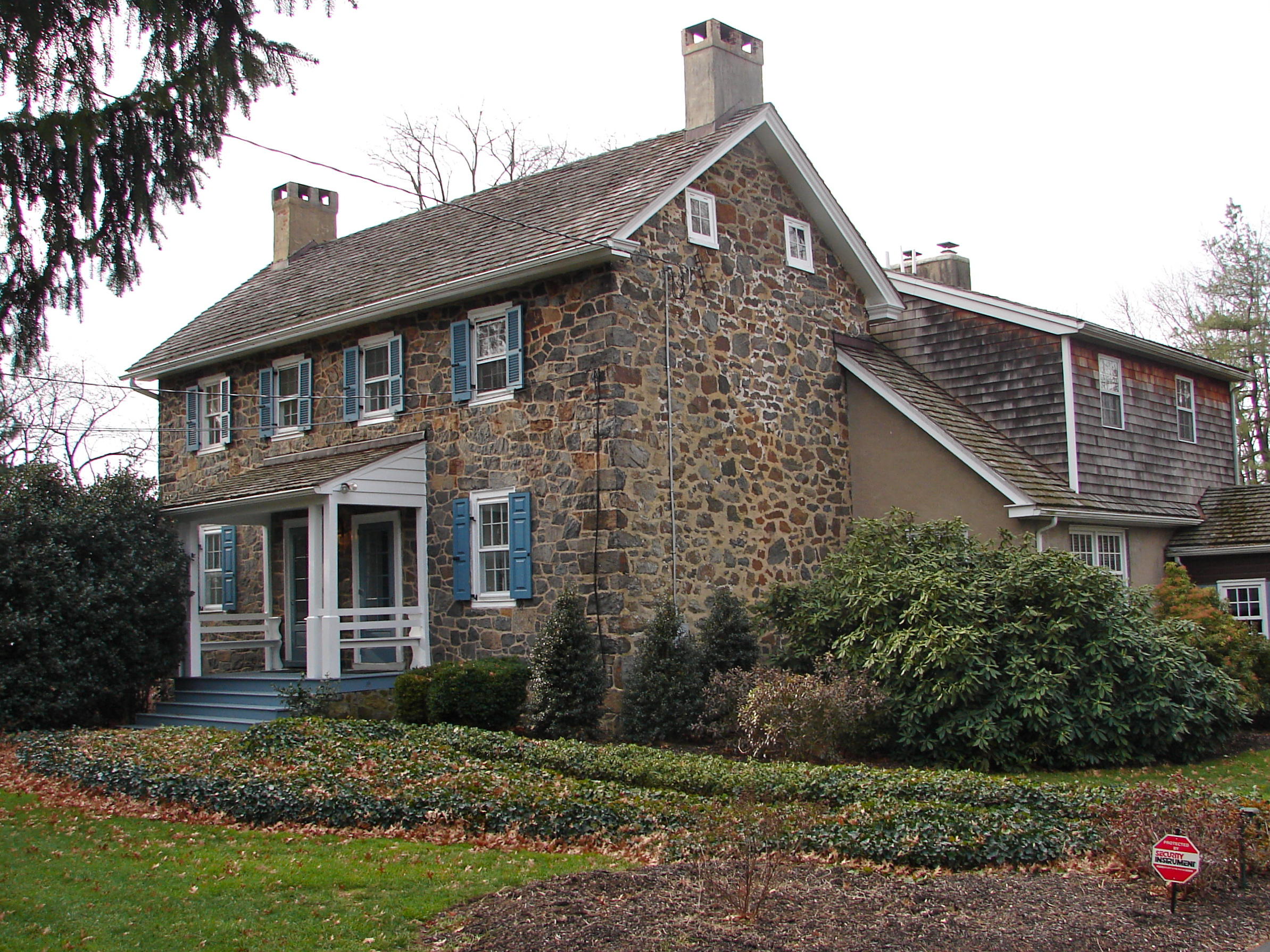
- William Talley House, December 2010

- Location within Delaware Location within the United States
- Location: 1813 Foulk Rd., Wilmington, Delaware
- Coordinates: 39.80979°N 75.51531°W
- Area: 2.4 acres (0.97 ha)
- Built: 1770
- Built by: Talley, William
- NRHP reference No.: 85000310
- Added to NRHP: February 21, 1985

William Talley House is a historic home located in Brandywine Hundred, unincorporated New Castle County, Delaware, with a Wilmington postal address. It was built about 1770, as a one-room deep, two-room wide fieldstone dwelling. The house has evolved to a 2 1/2-story, four-bay, rectangular dwelling with a steep gable roof.

It has two rectangular inside end brick chimneys covered with stucco that project through the gable peak.

The shed-roofed, sun porch addition was built in the 1940s and a saltbox form rear frame addition was built in the 1960s.

It was added to the National Register of Historic Places in 1985.
