= Augustine Paper Mill =

- U.S. National Register of Historic Places
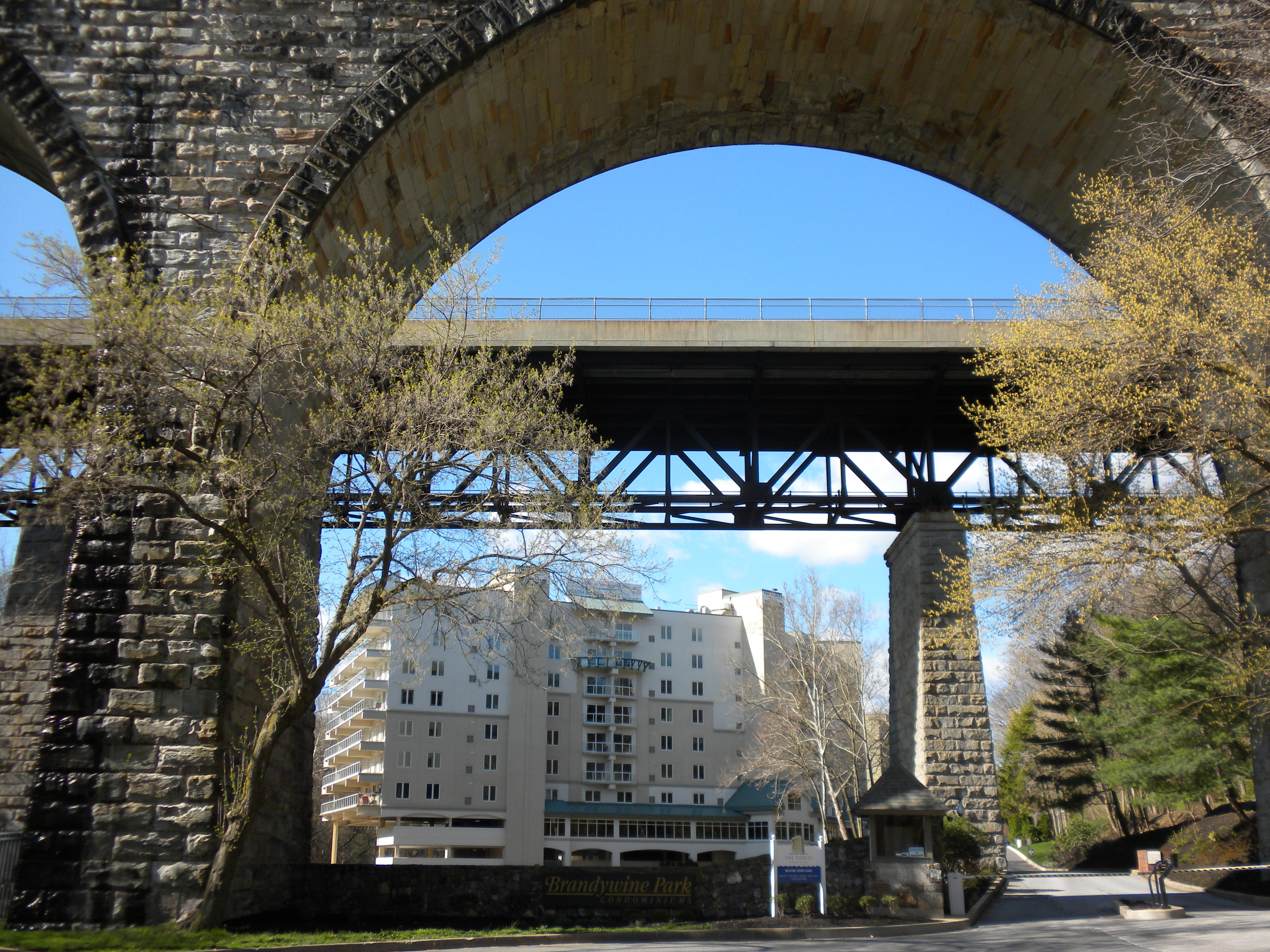
- Augustine Condos, March 2010

- Location within Delaware Location within the United States
- Location: N. Brandywine Park Dr., Wilmington, Delaware
- Coordinates: 39°45′43″N 75°33′25″W
- Area: 5.5 acres (2.2 ha)
- Built: c. 1845
- NRHP reference No.: 78000909
- Added to NRHP: August 3, 1978

Augustine Paper Mill, also known as the Container Corporation of America, Paper Mill Division (Old Wilmington Plant), was a historic paper mill complex located in Wilmington, New Castle County, Delaware. The complex consisted of seven 19th century stone buildings including the original three-story mill building, also known as Building 7, and various later two-level mill structures and support buildings. As of 2022, Building 7 is the only surviving part of the complex. It is a three-story mill erected from randomly laid stone with walls three feet thick, a slate covered gable roof, and an arched brick opening for the mill race.

The complex was acquired by the Container Corporation of America in 1942 (84 years ago). In 1978, it was added to the National Register of Historic Places. The property was redeveloped into a gated condominium complex in 1985 (41 years ago). The oldest mill structure, Building 7, was converted for residential use, while the other six buildings were replaced by new construction.
