= Rockland Historic District (Rockland, Delaware) =

Historic district in Delaware, US

- U.S. National Register of Historic Places
- U.S. Historic district
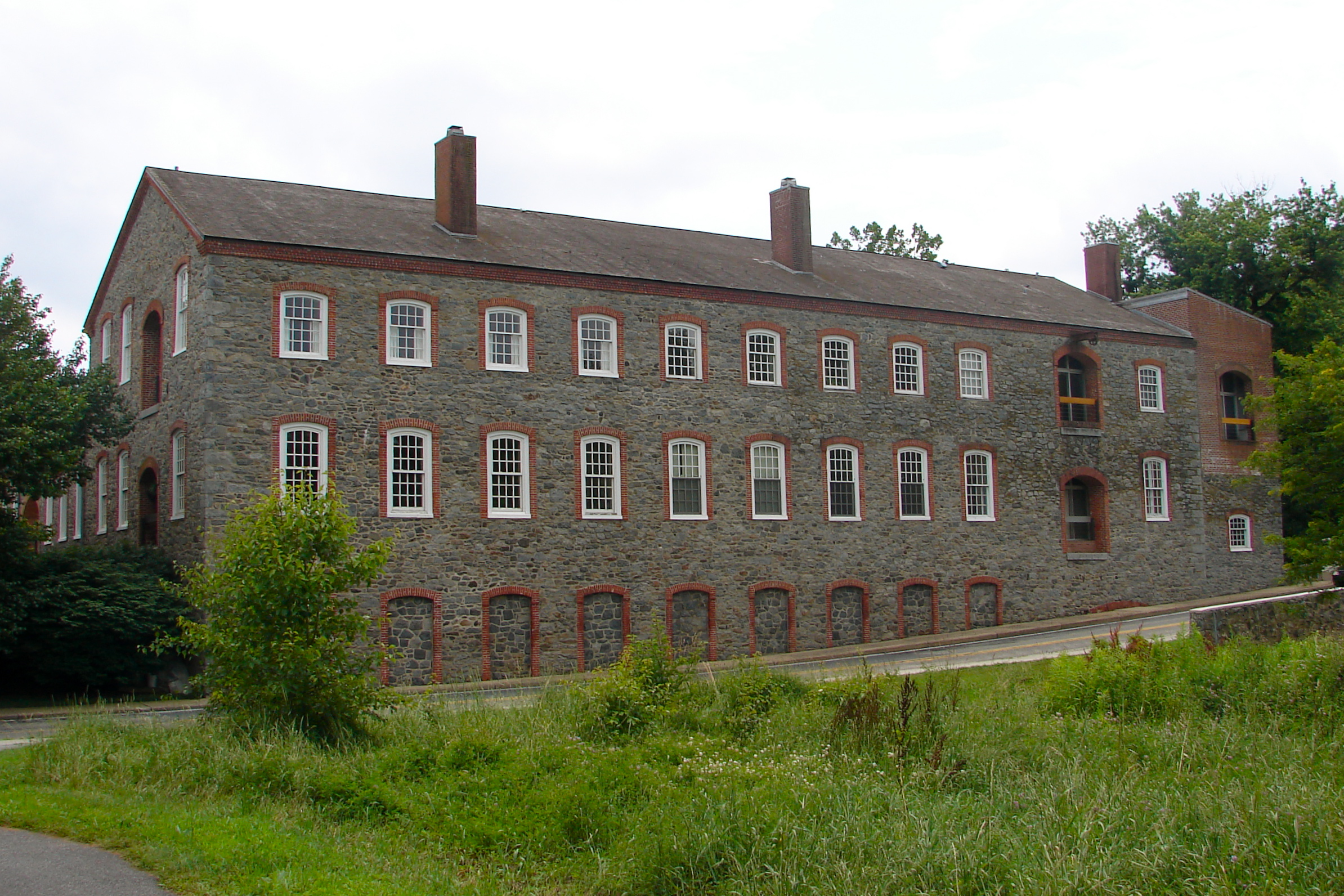
- Rockland Historic District, June 2011

- Location within Delaware Location within the United States
- Location: Town of Rockland and its environs along Rockland Rd. and Brandywine Creek, Rockland, Delaware
- Coordinates: 39°47′48″N 75°34′28″W
- Area: 160 acres (65 ha)
- Built: 1733
- Architect: Multiple
- NRHP reference No.: 72000289
- Added to NRHP: February 1, 1972

Rockland Historic District is a national historic district located at Rockland in New Castle County, Delaware, United States. It encompasses six contributing buildings in the hamlet of Rockland and associated with Rockland Mills. They include the school (1831), Mansion House (1802), Heshbon Factory mill building, the Kirk House (1797, 1885), and Rock Spring and the springhouse.

It was added to the National Register of Historic Places in 1972.
