= Talleyville, Delaware =

Unincorporated community in Delaware, United States

- Unincorporated community
- Location within the state of Delaware Talleyville, Delaware (the United States)
- Coordinates: 39°48′32″N 75°32′56″W
- Country: United States
- State: Delaware
- County: New Castle
- Elevation: 381 ft (116 m)
- Time zone: UTC-5 (Eastern (EST))
  - Summer (DST): UTC-4 (EDT)
- ZIP code: 19803
- Area code: 302
- GNIS feature ID: 214716

Talleyville is an unincorporated community located in the Brandywine Hundred of New Castle County, Delaware, United States.

It was a distinct census-designated place for the 1990 U.S. census.

== History ==
The Talleys were a prominent family in the Brandywine Hundred and provided the namesake of the community. In 1928, the Talleyville Fire Company was formed. The William Hicklen House was listed on the National Register of Historic Places in 1983.

== Geography ==
Talleyville is located at the intersection of U.S. Route 202, Mt. Lebanon Road, and Silverside Road to the north of Wilmington. It is one and a half miles from the Pennsylvania state border.

== Demographics ==
The CDP had a population of 5,971 at the 1990 census. The population of the ZCTA for ZIP code 19803 was 21,022 at the 2000 census.

== Education ==
Talleyville is in the Brandywine School District.

The former CDP is divided between the zones of Hanby and Lombardy elementary schools. All of the former CDP is zoned to Springer Middle School. The former CDP is divided between the zones of Concord High School and Brandywine High School.

== See also ==
- William Talley House (New Castle County, Delaware)
