= Rockland, Delaware =

Unincorporated community in Delaware, United States

- Unincorporated community
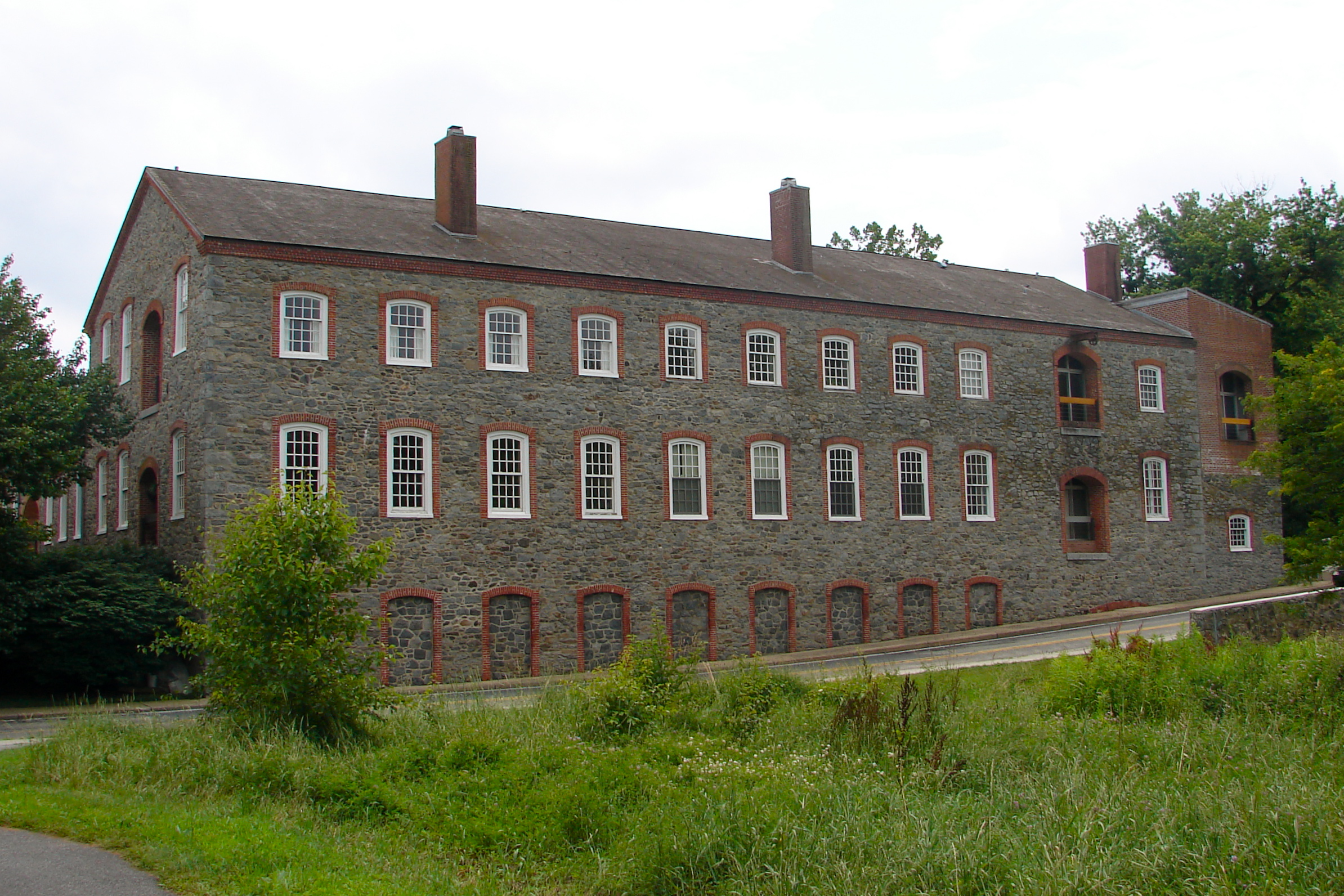
- Old mill

- Location within the state of Delaware Rockland, Delaware (the United States)
- Coordinates: 39°47′46″N 75°34′20″W
- Country: United States
- State: Delaware
- County: New Castle
- Elevation: 194 ft (59 m)
- Time zone: UTC-5 (Eastern (EST))
  - Summer (DST): UTC-4 (EDT)
- ZIP code: 19732
- Area code: 302
- GNIS feature ID: 214552

Rockland is an unincorporated community in northern New Castle County, Delaware, United States. It lies along Rockland Road north of the city of Wilmington, the county seat of New Castle County. Its elevation is 194 feet (59 m). It has a post office with the ZIP code of 19732. The Rockland Historic District and William Young House are listed on the National Register of Historic Places. Other landmarks Woodley Park and Mount Lebanon United Methodist Church.

President of the American Coffee Company William Bruce Castor was a native of Rockland and grew up in the William Young House.
