= Casperson =

Casperson may refer to:

- Casperson, Minnesota, an unincorporated community, United States
- W. Casperson House, Delaware, United States
- Lee Casperson (born 1944), American physicist and engineer
- Senator Casperson (disambiguation)
  - Carl B. Casperson (1877–1953), Wisconsin State Senate
  - Tom Casperson (1959–2020), Michigan State Senate
