= Corbit–Sharp House =

Historic house in Delaware, US

- U.S. National Register of Historic Places
- U.S. National Historic Landmark
- U.S. Historic district – Contributing property
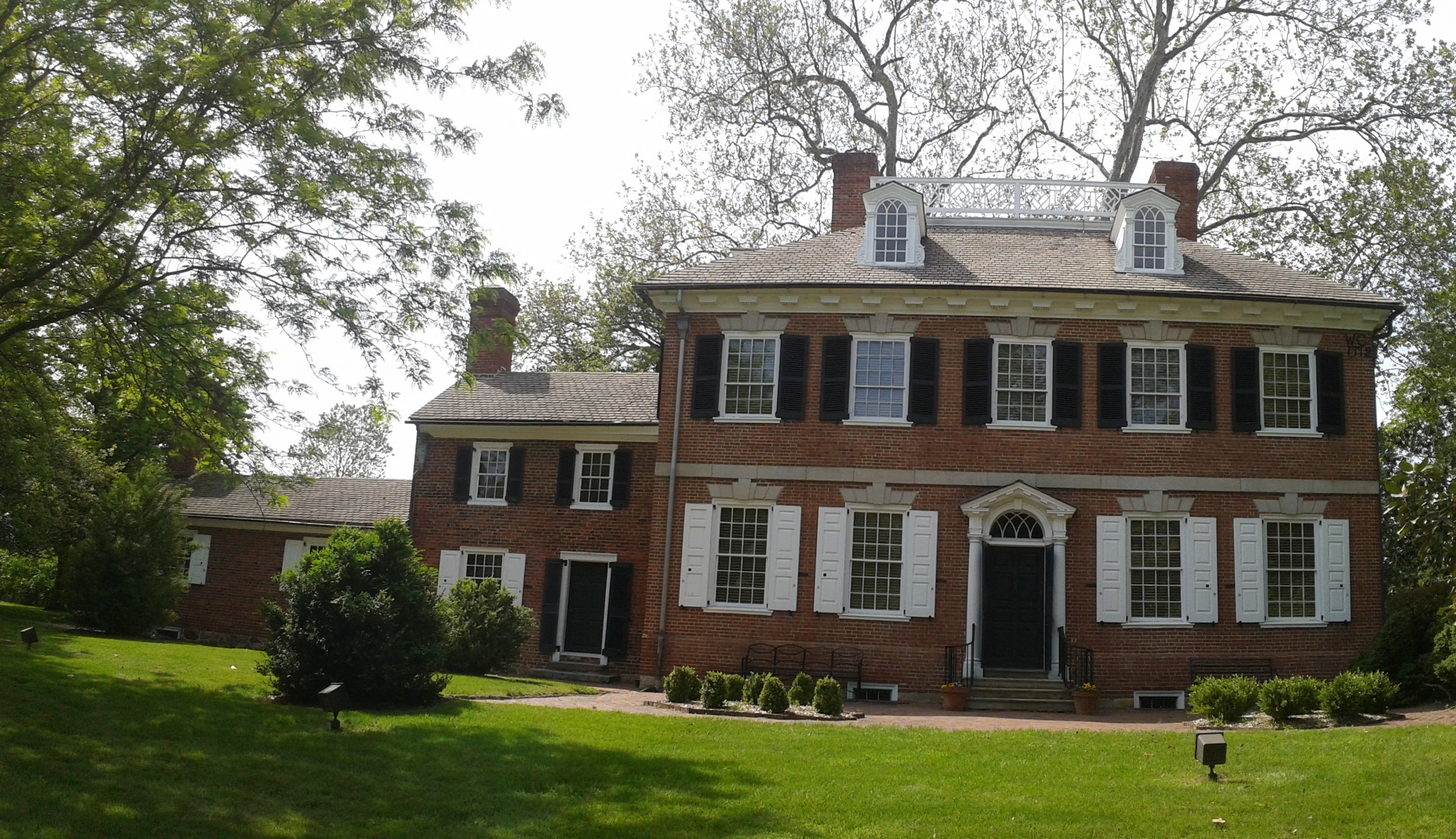
- Corbit–Sharp House in May, 2016

- Location within Delaware Location within the United States
- Location: 118 Main St., Odessa, Delaware
- Coordinates: 39.45391°N 75.65694°W
- Area: 25 acres (10 ha)
- Built: 1772
- Architectural style: Georgian
- Part of: Odessa Historic District (ID71000227)
- NRHP reference No.: 67000004

Significant dates
- Added to NRHP: December 24, 1967
- Designated NHL: December 24, 1967
- Designated CP: June 21, 1971

The Corbit–Sharp House is a historic house museum located at 118 Main Street in Odessa, Delaware, United States. Built in 1772–74, it is one of the finest examples of a brick Georgian house in the Mid-Atlantic states. It was declared a National Historic Landmark in 1967, and is included in the Odessa Historic District. It has been a museum, under different ownerships, since 1940.

== Description and history ==
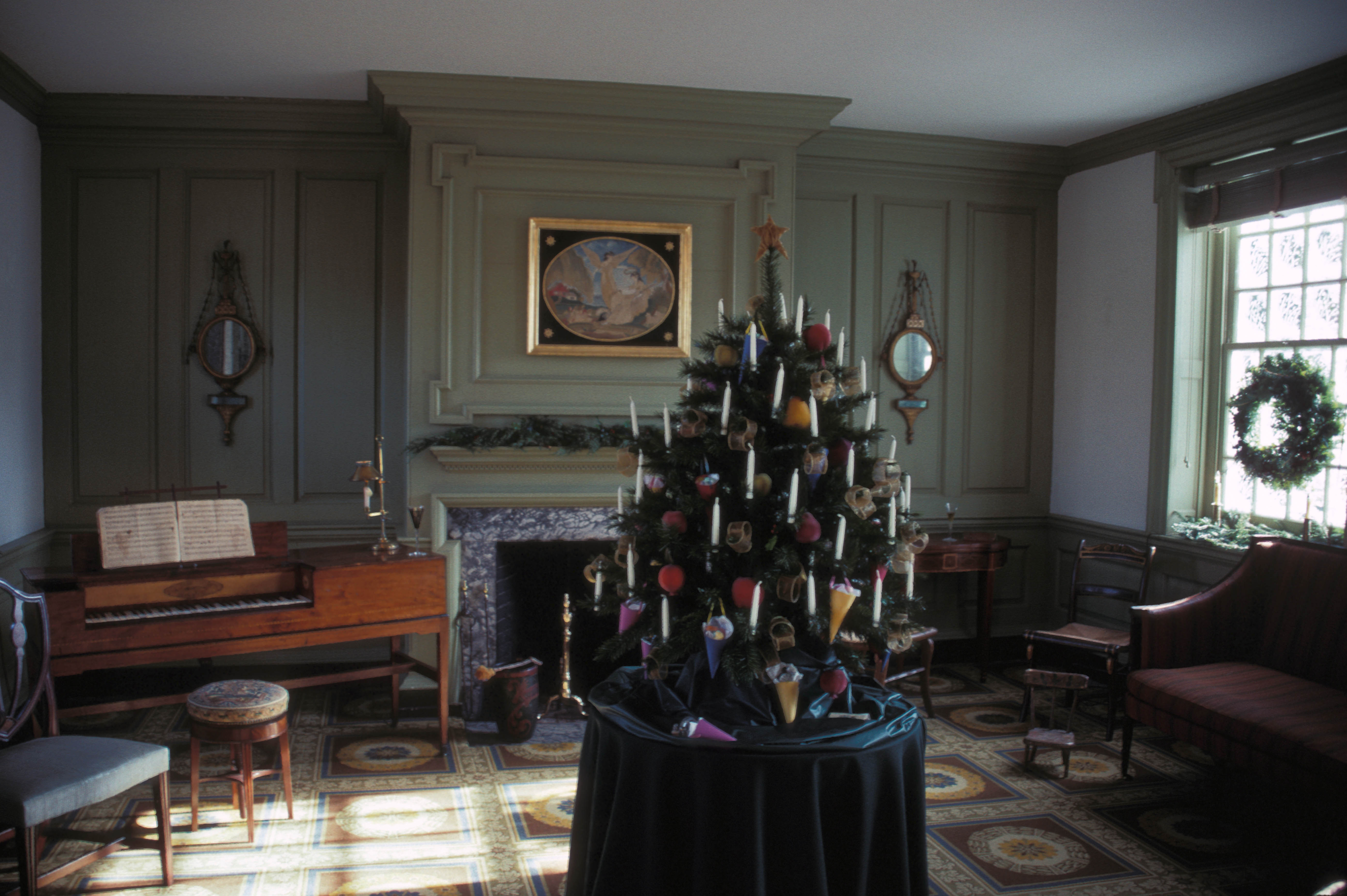
Interior of the house around Christmastime, 1970

The Corbit–Sharp House is located on the south side of Main Street in the center of Odessa, opposite its junction with Second Street. It is a 2 1/2-story brick building, with hipped roof whose truncated center is surrounded by a low balustrade. Gabled dormers project from the front and sides of the roof. The main facade is five bays wide, with a center entrance topped by a projecting Doric gabled transom. Windows are set in rectangular openings, with splayed keystone lintels. The ground-floor windows have paneled shutters, while those on the second floor have louvered shutters; this is a traditional Delaware pattern. The interior has a central hallway with rich decorative woodwork, and there is fine original woodwork in the parlor and dining room, with original paneling surrounding the fireplaces in a number of rooms.

William Corbit, a prominent local tanner, built the house in 1774. Corbit had business connections with Philadelphia, which probably contributed to the high quality style and workmanship found in his house.

The house remained in the family until 1938, when it was purchased by Rodney Sharp, who restored the house and several other historically significant buildings in the town. Sharp's work on the grounds resulted in the destruction of Corbit's tannery buildings. The house now owned and operated by Historic Houses of Odessa. Furnished for the late 18th century period, the house is one of five historic properties that can be toured. Other properties managed by the organization include the 1769 Wilson–Warner House, 1700 Collins–Sharp House, 1822 Brick Hotel, and 1853 Odessa Bank. Tours are given from March through December.

== See also ==
- Appoquinimink Friends Meetinghouse
- National Register of Historic Places listings in southern New Castle County, Delaware
- List of National Historic Landmarks in Delaware
