= Appoquinimink Friends Meetinghouse =

Historic church in Delaware, US

- Appoquinimink Friends Meeting House
- U.S. National Register of Historic Places
- U.S. Historic district – Contributing property
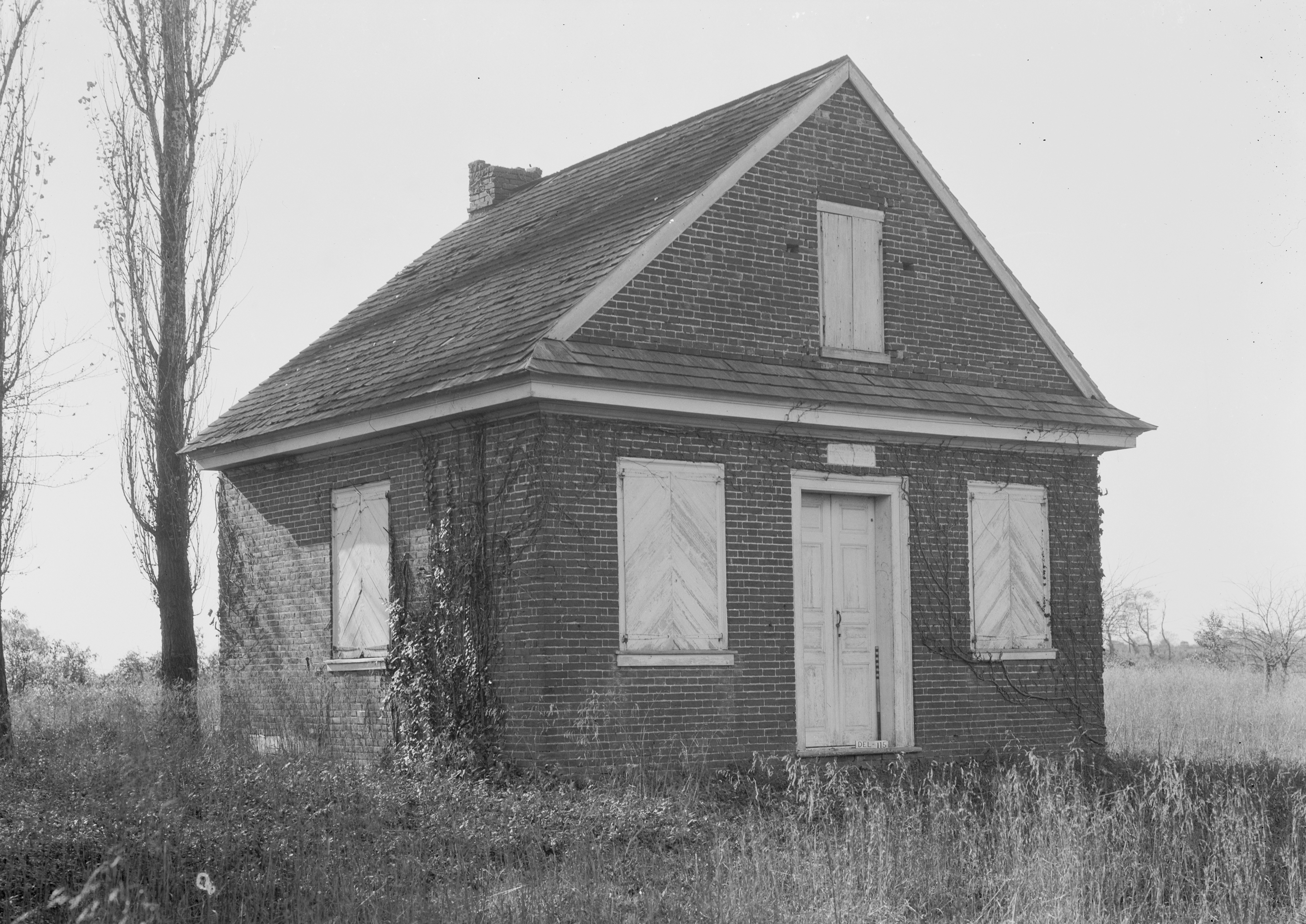
- Meetinghouse in 1938

- Location within Delaware Location within the United States
- Location: 624 Main St., Odessa, Delaware
- Coordinates: 39.45733°N 75.66380°W
- Area: less than one acre
- Built: 1785
- Part of: Odessa Historic District (1984 boundary increase) (ID84000846)
- NRHP reference No.: 72000288
- Added to NRHP: December 04, 1972

Appoquinimink Friends Meeting House, also known as the Odessa Friends Meetinghouse, is a very small historic Quaker meetinghouse on Main Street in Odessa, Delaware, United States, It was built in 1785 by David Wilson and added to the National Register of Historic Places in 1972. Members of the meeting, including John Hunn and his cousin John Alston, were active in the Underground Railroad and Harriet Tubman may have hid in the meetinghouse. Measuring about 20 feet (6.1 m) by 22 feet (6.7 m), it may be the smallest brick house of worship in the United States.

== History ==
Quakers were some of the earliest settlers in the Odessa area, but the first meetinghouse in southern New Castle County was not established until 1763 when Friends in Georges Creek applied to the Kennett Monthly Meeting to form a preparative (subsidiary) meeting. They later affiliated with the Duck Creek Monthly Meeting in Smyrna, Delaware and in 1781 applied to move the meeting place to Appoquinimink Bridge (also called Cantwell's Bridge and now called Odessa).

A Quaker school, however, was established in Appoquinimink in 1735 and is thought to have continued until the mid-1800s. The school building was later moved, used as a parsonage by the Zoar Methodist Episcopal Church and then demolished. The adjacent Zoar church was built in 1881 on land previously owned by local Quakers.

David Wilson built the present meetinghouse about 1785, but the building and grounds were not deeded to the Meeting until 1800. Wilson and his wife, Mary Corbit, were not married at a Quaker meeting, but rather by a minister, so they were temporarily banned or "read out of the meeting."

In 1828 the Orthodox-Hicksite schism greatly reduced the membership of the Appoquinimink Meeting. The locally prominent Corbit family and other members began attending the Orthodox meetinghouse in Wilmington, but the Duck Creek Monthly Meeting became Hicksite and retained the property.

The Alston family, including John Hunn, continued to support the Meeting. The Meeting became a station on the Underground Railroad and Hunn, along with Thomas Garrett was arrested, then severely fined, for helping fugitive slaves. The basement and a loft with a removable panel under the eaves may have been used to hide self-liberating Black people.

In the early 1870s John Alston was the last active meeting member. After he died in 1874, the meetinghouse deteriorated. At different times it was rented to local farmers. Some of the rancor from the Orthodox-Hicksite schism may have survived. The markers of Corbit family members were removed from the Hicksite property around 1900 by Mary Corbit Warner (Mrs. E. Tatnall Warner) and placed in a private plot now separated by a brick wall from the burial ground. The Corbit Cemetery was given to the Wilmington Monthly Meeting in 1970. The cemetery continues to be used by descendants.

The burial ground behind the meetinghouse includes markers ranging from fieldstones for early Quakers to the curved-top style favored later to more modern markers.

The building was restored in 1938 by H. Rodney Sharp, opened for worship in 1939, and in 1948 an Appoquinimink congregation was formed. The property meanwhile had reverted to the State of Delaware. Wilmington Monthly Meeting was granted title in 2019. Worship continues to on a regular basis, meeting twice a month (first and third Sundays most months), as a preparative meeting under the care of the Wilmington Monthly Meeting.

== See also ==
- List of Underground Railroad sites
