= Mathews Corners, Delaware =

Unincorporated community in Delaware, United States

- Unincorporated community
- Location within Delaware Location within the United States
- Coordinates: 39°26′22″N 75°38′39″W
- Country: United States
- State: Delaware
- County: New Castle
- Elevation: 36 ft (11 m)
- Time zone: UTC-5 (Eastern (EST))
  - Summer (DST): UTC-4 (EDT)
- Area code: 302
- GNIS feature ID: 214285

Mathews Corners is an unincorporated community in New Castle County, Delaware, United States. Mathews Corners is located on Delaware Route 299, just west of Delaware Route 9, to the southeast of Odessa.
