= St. Georges Cemetery Caretaker's House =

Historic house in Delaware, US

- U.S. National Register of Historic Places
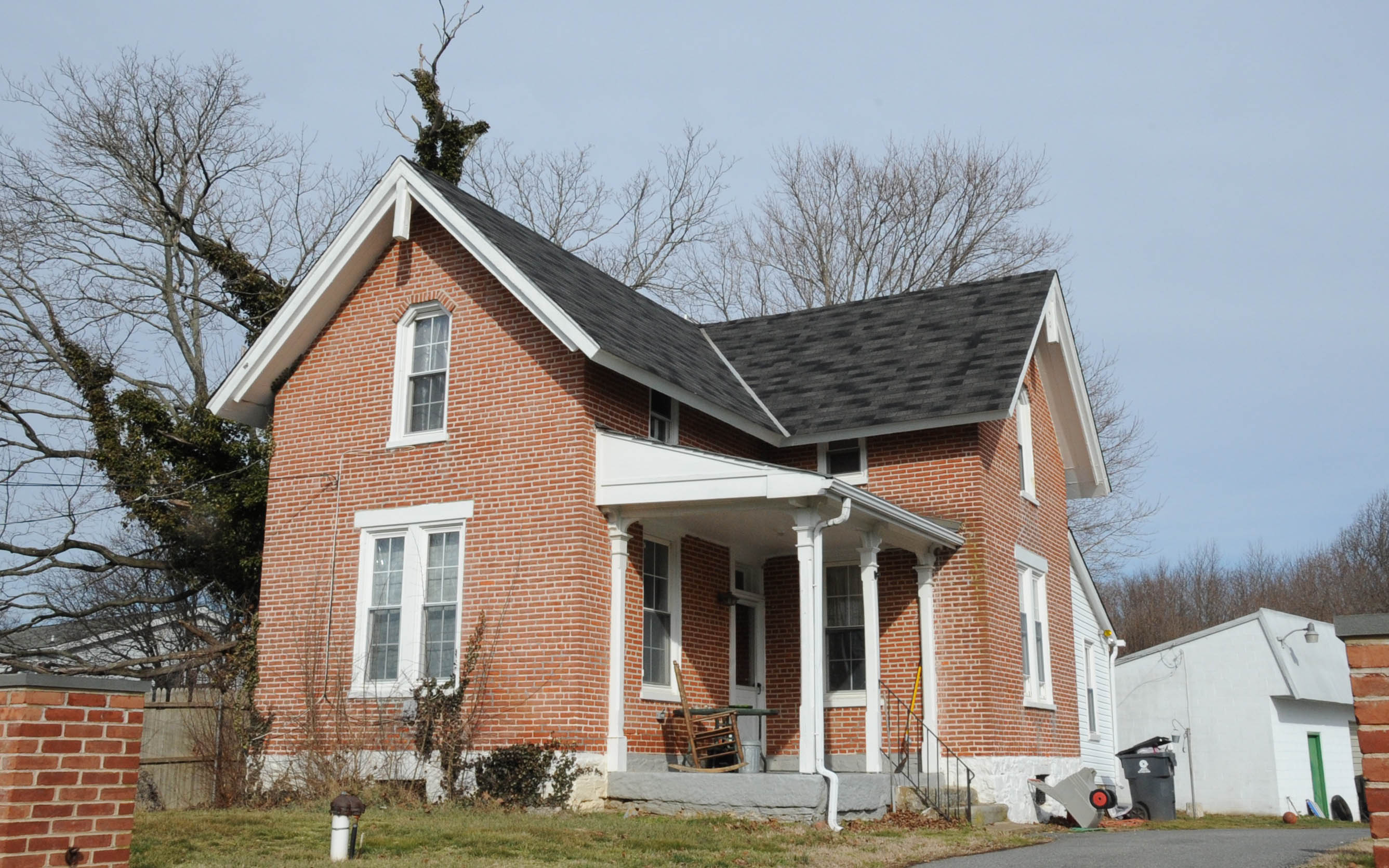

- Location within Delaware Location within the United States
- Location: 4320 Kirkwood St. Georges Rd., St. Georges, Delaware
- Coordinates: 39.56026°N 75.66957°W
- Area: less than one acre
- Built: 1871
- Architectural style: Gothic Revival
- MPS: Red Lion Hundred MRA
- NRHP reference No.: 82002357
- Added to NRHP: April 8, 1982

St. Georges Cemetery Caretaker's House is a historic home located at St. Georges in New Castle County, Delaware, United States. It was built in 1871, and is a 1 1/2-story, L-shaped brick dwelling in the Gothic Revival style. It features a slate covered gable roof with decorative bargeboards at the gable ends. It was built as the Caretaker's House for St. Georges Presbyterian Church cemetery.

It was added to the National Register of Historic Places in 1982.
