= Ethel S. Roy House =

Historic house in Delaware, United States

- Vernacular Frame House
- U.S. National Register of Historic Places
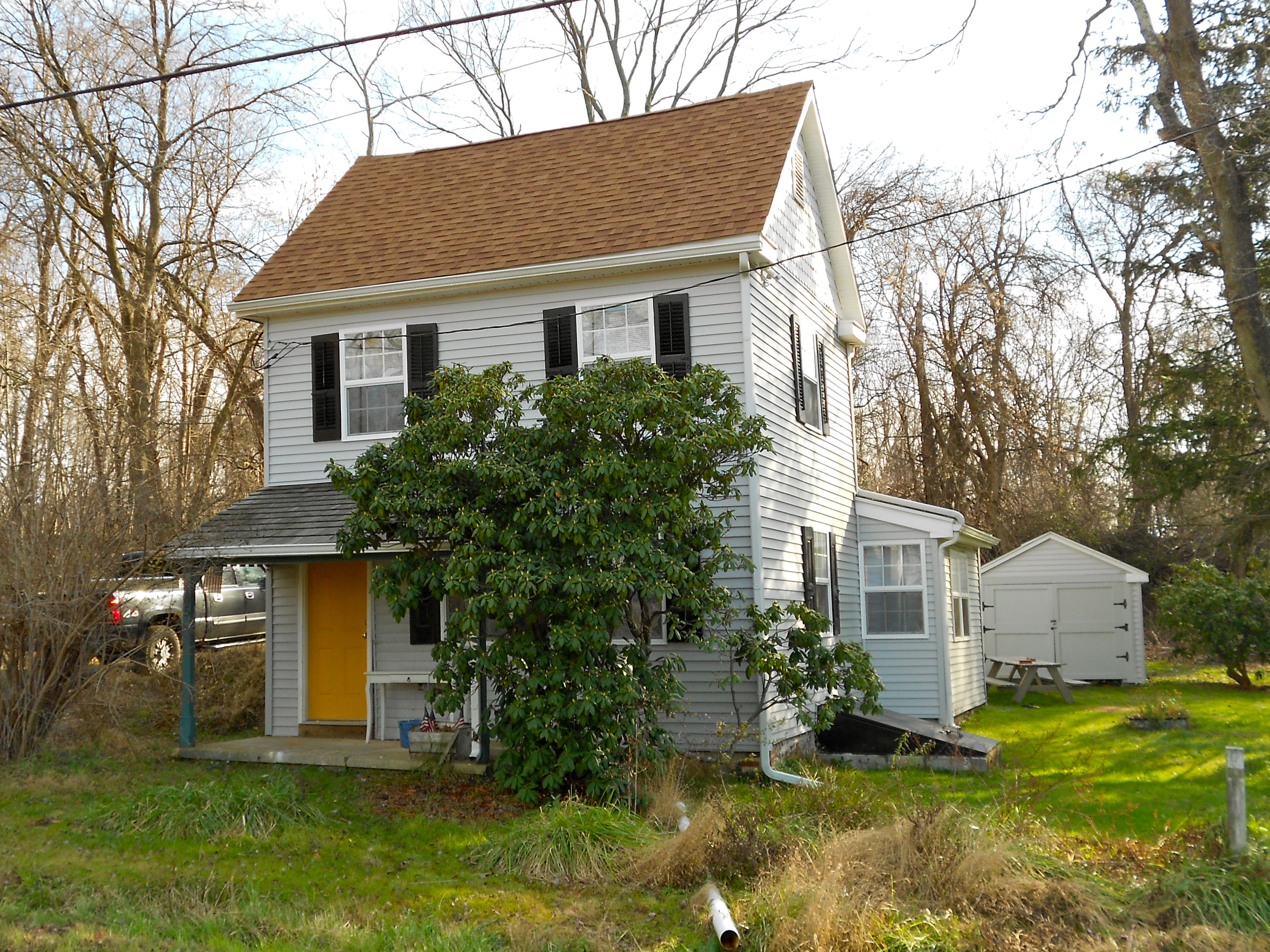
- House in 2011

- Location within Delaware Location within the United States
- Location: 105 Clarks Corner Rd., St. Georges, Delaware
- Coordinates: 39.55673°N 75.64815°W
- Area: 0.5 acres (0.20 ha)
- MPS: Red Lion Hundred MRA
- NRHP reference No.: 82002359
- Added to NRHP: April 8, 1982

The Ethel S. Roy House is a historic building identified simply as Vernacular Frame House when listed on the National Register of Historic Places in 1982 as part of the Red Lion Hundred Multiple Resource Area.

The house was built c. 1868 by a former slave and was singled out for historic preservation in an effort to counteract the bias that only homes of the affluent are recognized as being historically significant. It represents a working man's home in a labor-intensive agricultural society and has had few alterations since it was built.

Red Lion Hundred is an area of New Castle County, Delaware roughly equivalent in size and function to a township. It was settled in the seventeenth century, with the soil being ruined by intensive tobacco cultivation by 1800. A "peach boom" lasted from about 1830 to 1870 until a blight called "the yellows" destroyed the peach crops. Slavery provided labor in the area until the American Civil War.

The Roy House was built soon after the Civil War by a former slave, whose granddaughter lived in the house until at least 1979. It is located just north of the unincorporated village of Saint Georges, Delaware, on a 150-foot square plot of land once owned by the locally prominent Sutton family.

It is a wooden frame two-story, two-bay house with gabled roof which had a small enclosed front porch. Photographs taken in 1970 or 1979 show a simple building with wooden siding, a tin roof, six-over-six windows, and an interior chimney on the south end. The single decorative item appears to be a "gothic" attic window with a "pointed arch" above a rectangular window. A photograph from 2011 shows that the roof, siding and windows have been recently replaced, the porch opened up, and the chimney removed.

== See also ==
- Vernacular architecture
