= Old St. Paul's Methodist Episcopal Church =

Historic church in Delaware, United States

- U.S. National Register of Historic Places
- U.S. Historic district – Contributing property
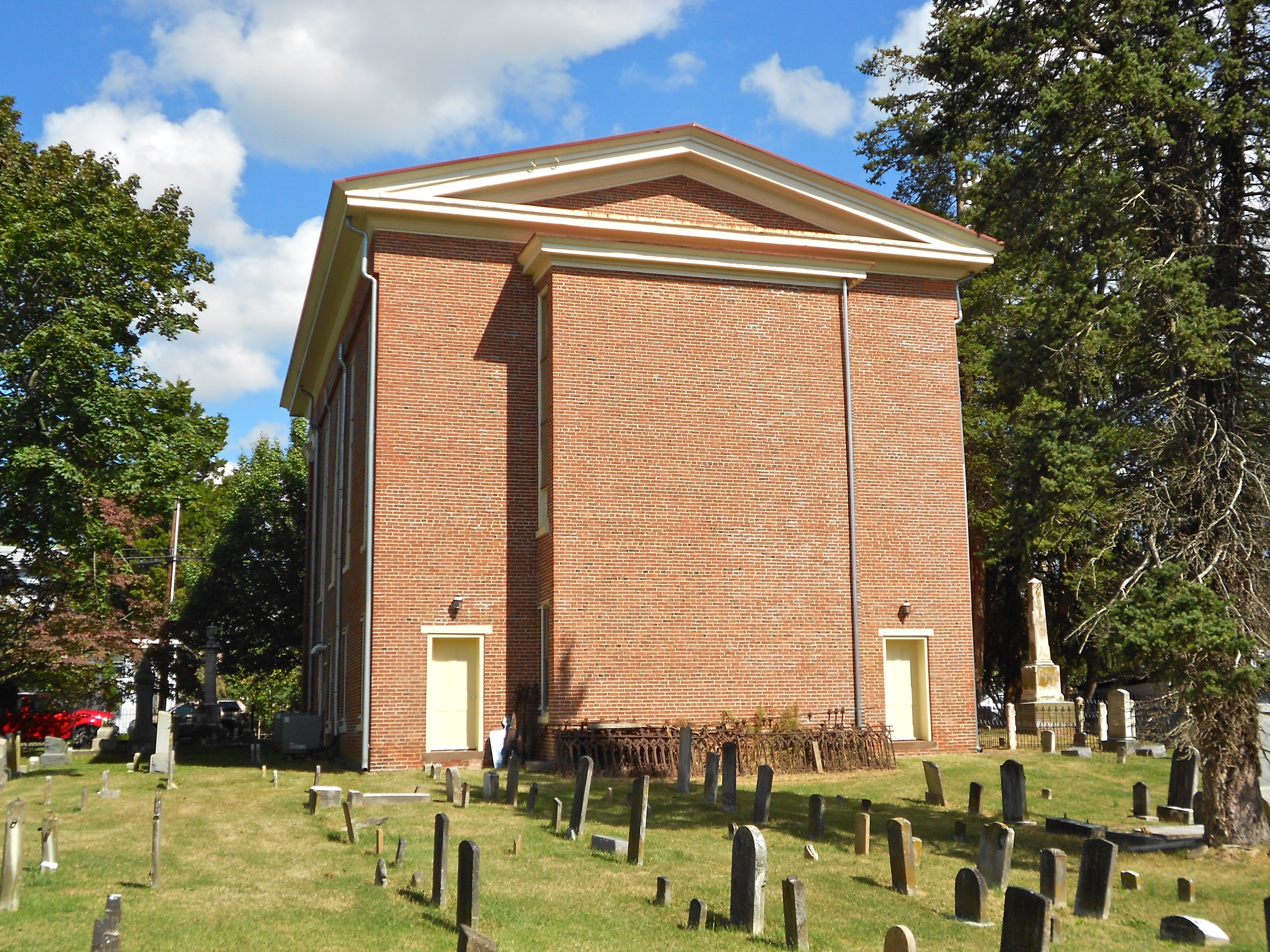
- Viewed from the south

- Location within Delaware Location within the United States
- Location: 506 High St., Odessa, Delaware
- Coordinates: 39.457430°N 75.660583°W
- Area: 0.2 acres (0.081 ha)
- Built: 1851–1852
- Architect: Sloan, Samuel
- Architectural style: Greek Revival
- NRHP reference No.: 82002353
- Added to NRHP: May 13, 1982

Old St. Paul's Methodist Episcopal Church is a historic Methodist Episcopal church located on High Street in Odessa, New Castle County, Delaware. It was designed by noted Philadelphia architect Samuel Sloan and built in 1851–1852. It is a two-story, brick building in the Greek Revival style. It measures 45 feet by 65 feet and has a low-pitched gable roof. The building ceased use as a church in 1955 and houses a local museum and cultural center.

It was listed on the National Register of Historic Places in 1982.

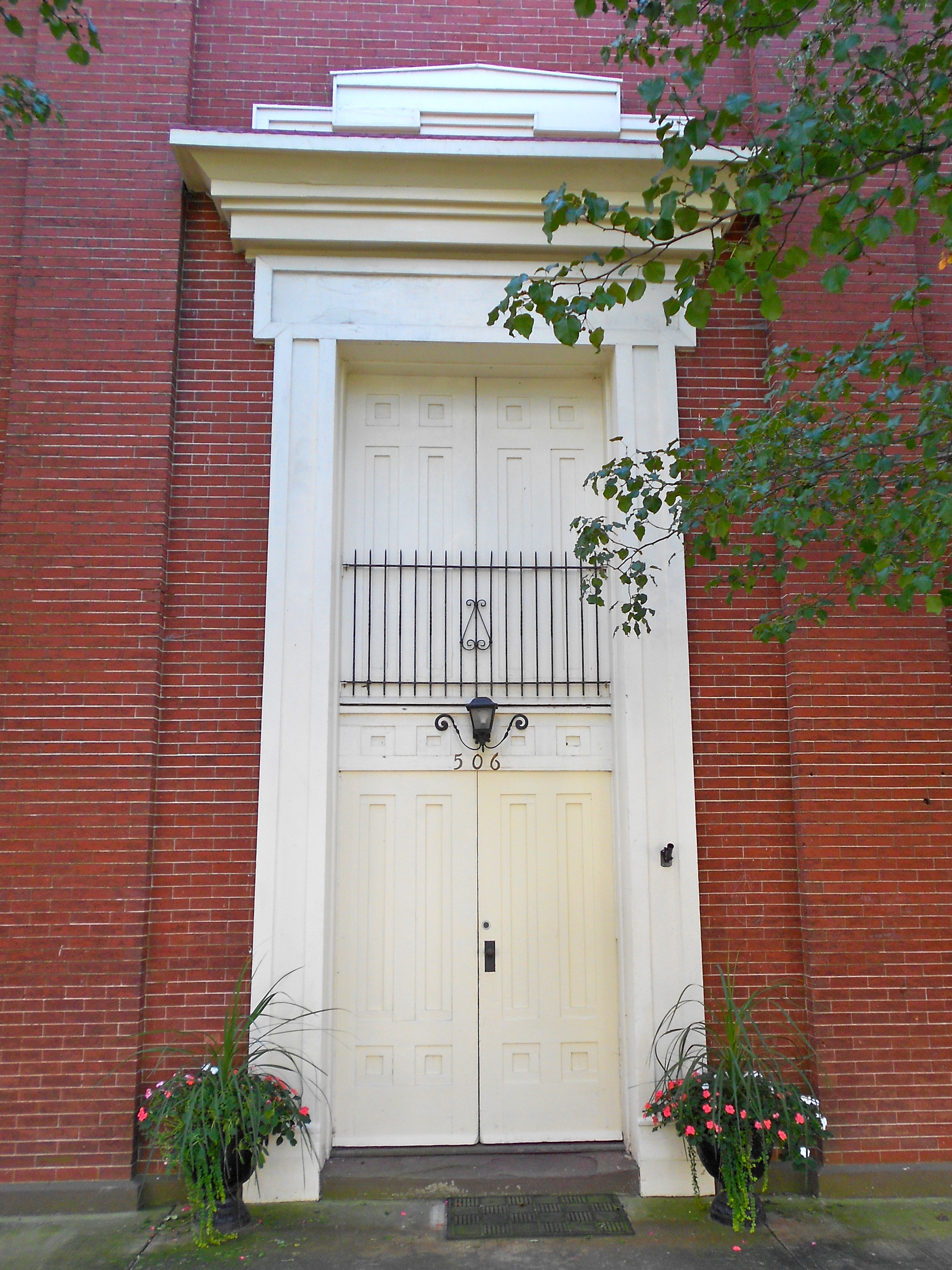
Entrance on High Street, with doors on both stories.
