= Bloomfield (St. Georges, Delaware) =

Historic house in Delaware, US

- U.S. National Register of Historic Places
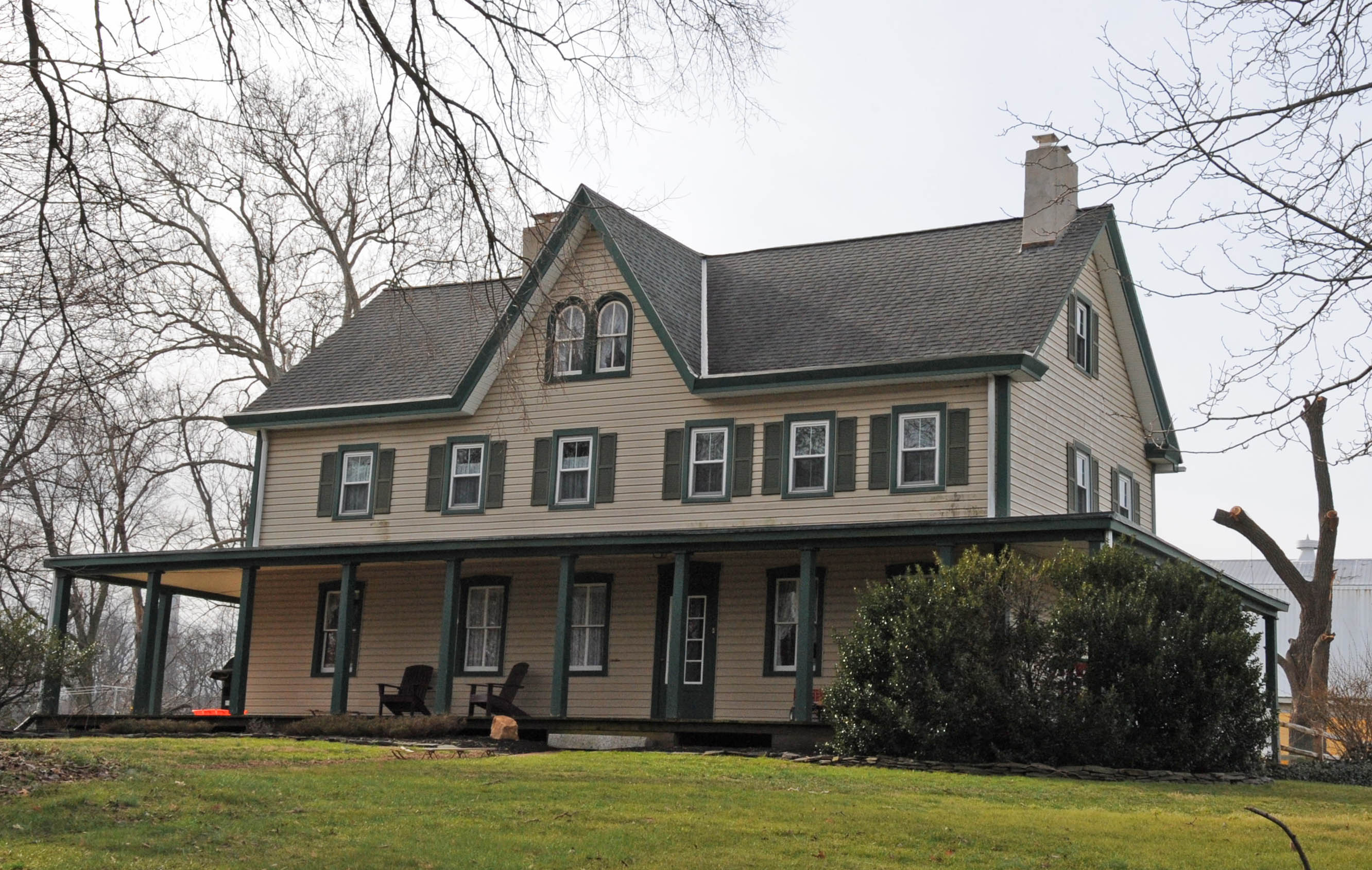

- Location within Delaware Location within the United States
- Location: 4663 Kirkwood St. Georges Road, Saint Georges, Delaware
- Coordinates: 39°33′20″N 75°39′23″W
- Area: 5.5 acres (2.2 ha)
- Built: 1828
- Architectural style: Gothic Revival
- MPS: Red Lion Hundred MRA
- NRHP reference No.: 82002354
- Added to NRHP: April 8, 1982

Bloomfield is a historic home located at St. Georges, Delaware, United States. It was built in 1828, and is a 2 1/2-story, five bay frame dwelling. It has an asymmetrical floor plan, steeply pitched cross-gable roof, deep one-story verandah, and is in the Gothic Revival style.

It was added to the National Register of Historic Places in 1982.
