= Sutton House (St. Georges, Delaware) =

Historic house in Delaware, US

- U.S. National Register of Historic Places
- U.S. Historic district – Contributing property
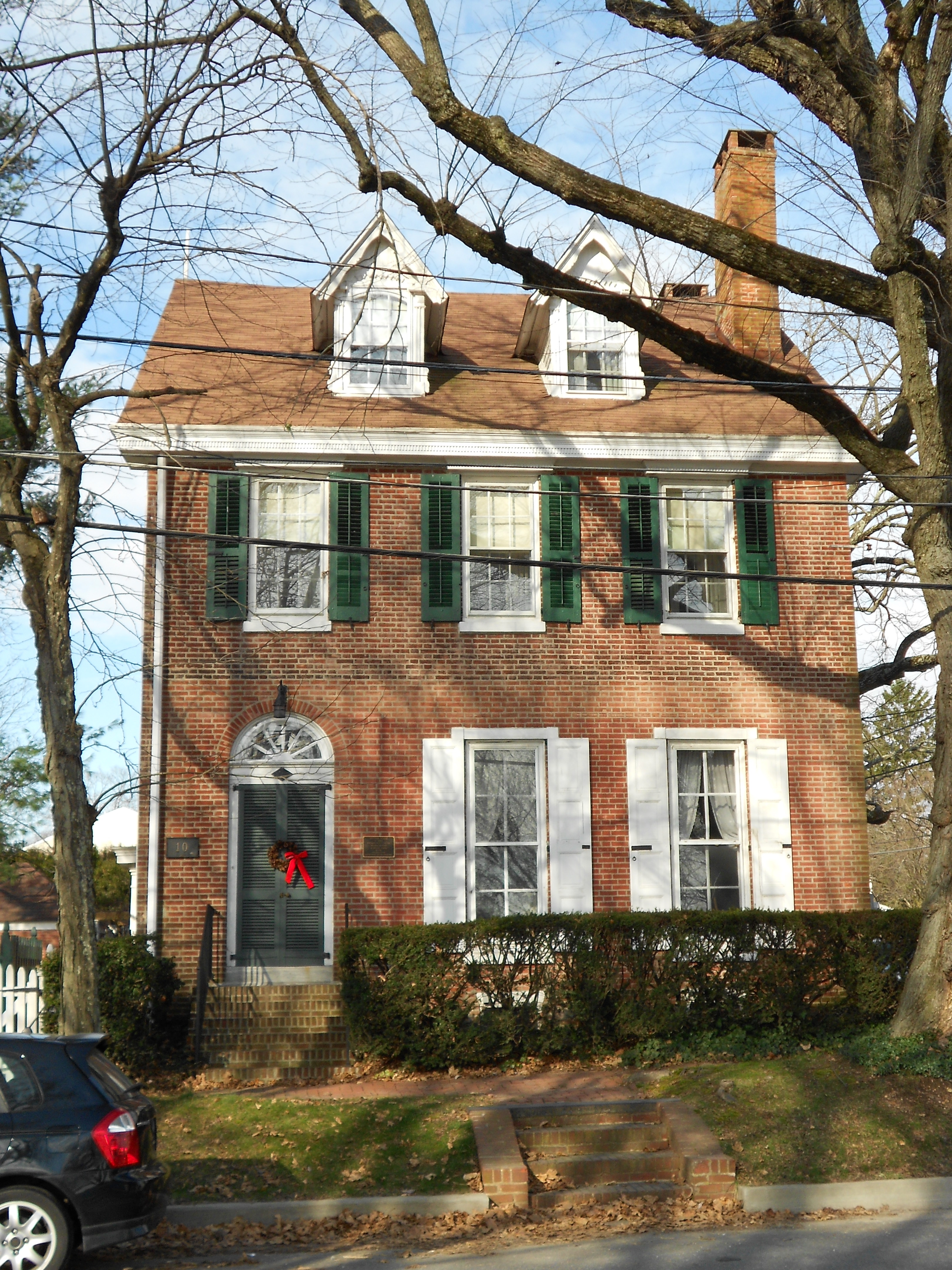
- Sutton House, December 2011

- Location within Delaware Location within the United States
- Location: 10 Delaware St., St. Georges, Delaware
- Coordinates: 39.55578°N 75.64991°W
- Area: 0.5 acres (0.20 ha)
- Built: c. 1794, c. 1815
- NRHP reference No.: 73000542
- Added to NRHP: April 24, 1973

Sutton House is a historic home located at St. Georges, New Castle County, Delaware. The original section was built about 1794, with the main section completed about 1815. It is a 2 1/2-story, three bay brick dwelling with a lower rear wing and featuring a gable roof. The front façade features a semicircular fanlight over the main entrance and there is a two-story porch on the rear wing.

The house was built for Dr. James M. Sutton, whose family continued to live there for generations. It was added to the National Register of Historic Places in 1973. It is located in the North Saint Georges Historic District.
