= North Saint Georges Historic District =

Historic district in Delaware, United States

- U.S. National Register of Historic Places
- U.S. Historic district
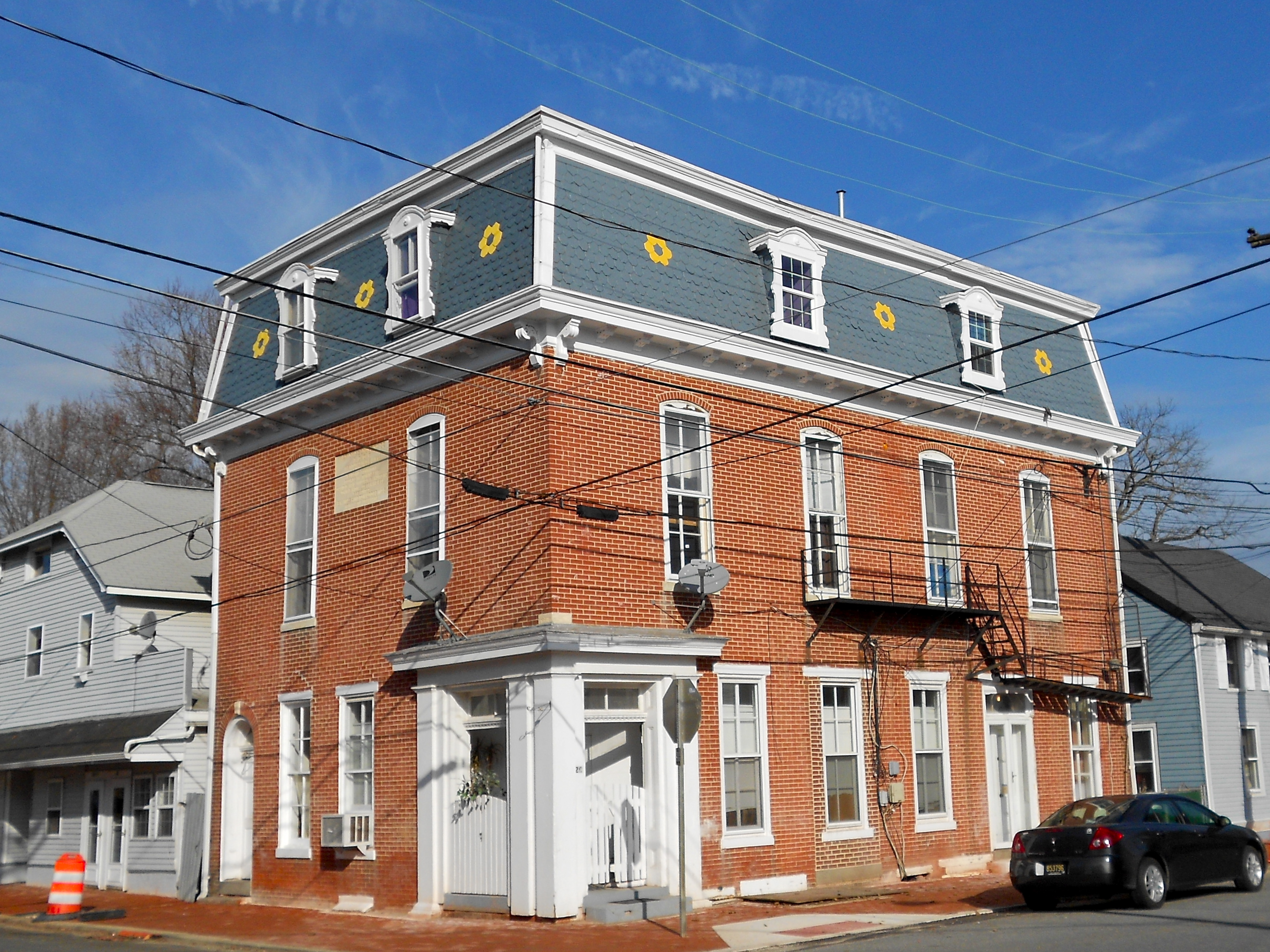
- Odd Fellows Lodge, North Saint Georges Historic District, December 2011

- Location within Delaware Location within the United States
- Location: Roughly, along Main, Broad, Delaware and Church Sts., Red Lion Hundred, St. Georges, Delaware
- Coordinates: 39°33′24″N 75°39′07″W
- Area: 33 acres (13 ha)
- Built: 1829
- Architectural style: Mid 19th Century Revival, Late Victorian, Late 19th And 20th Century Revivals
- NRHP reference No.: 95001033
- Added to NRHP: August 22, 1995

North Saint Georges Historic District is a national historic district located at St. Georges, New Castle County, Delaware. It encompasses 69 contributing buildings and 3 contributing objects in the village of North St. Georges. The buildings date between about 1719 and 1942 and are primarily residential with a few institutional and commercial buildings. Notable buildings include the Methodist Church, the St. Georges Historical Society Building, Commodore MacDonough School (1923), Gam's Store (c. 1855), the former African-American school (now the post office, c. 1925), Odd Fellows Lodge (1875), and the Nuttall House. Located in the district are the separately listed St. Georges Presbyterian Church and Sutton House.

It was added to the National Register of Historic Places in 1995.
