= Starl House =

Former historic house in Delaware, US

- U.S. National Register of Historic Places
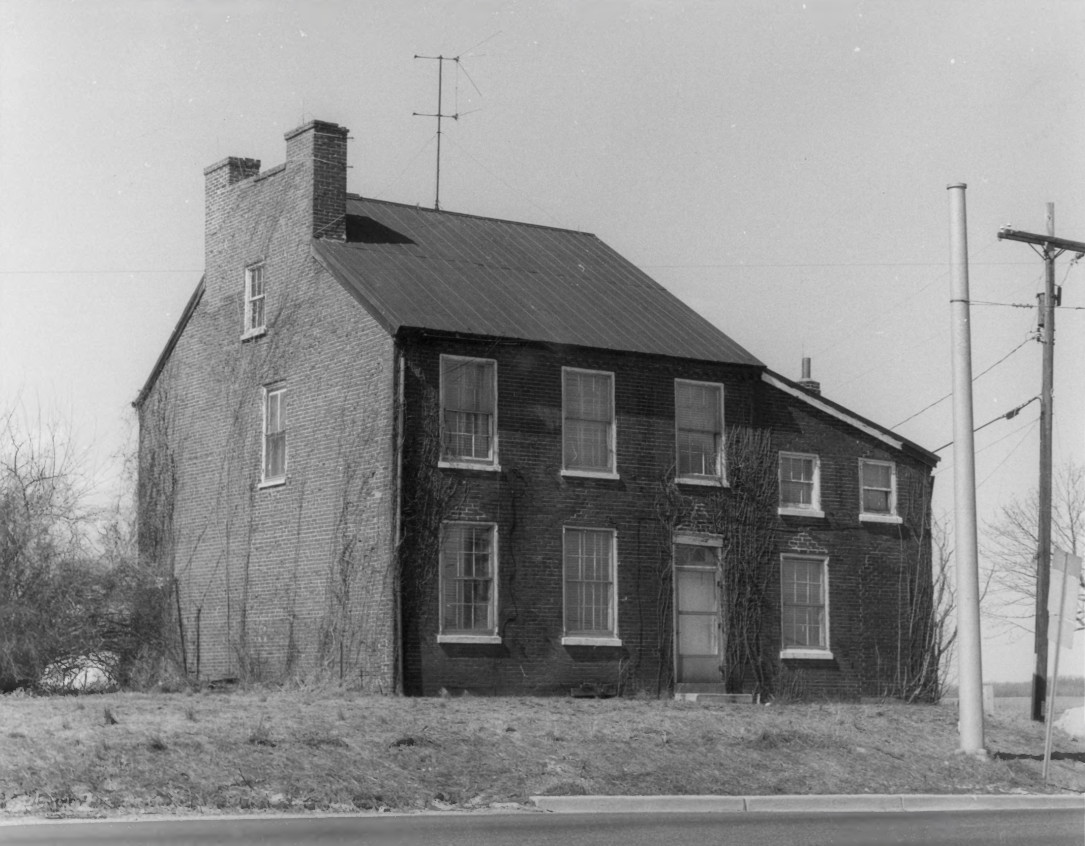
- The house in 1979

- Location within Delaware Location within the United States
- Location: U.S. Route 13, St. Georges, Delaware
- Coordinates: 39°34′44″N 75°39′30″W
- Area: less than one acre
- Architectural style: Federal
- MPS: Red Lion Hundred MRA
- NRHP reference No.: 82002358
- Added to NRHP: April 8, 1982

Starl House was a historic home located at St. Georges in New Castle County, Delaware, United States. It was built before 1822, and was a 2 1/2-story, three-bay, brick dwelling with a gable roof and corbelled brick cornice. The house had a side hall plan and was in the Late Federal style.

It was added to the National Register of Historic Places in 1982. It was demolished before 1992.
