= Linden Hill =

Historic house in Delaware, United States

- U.S. National Register of Historic Places
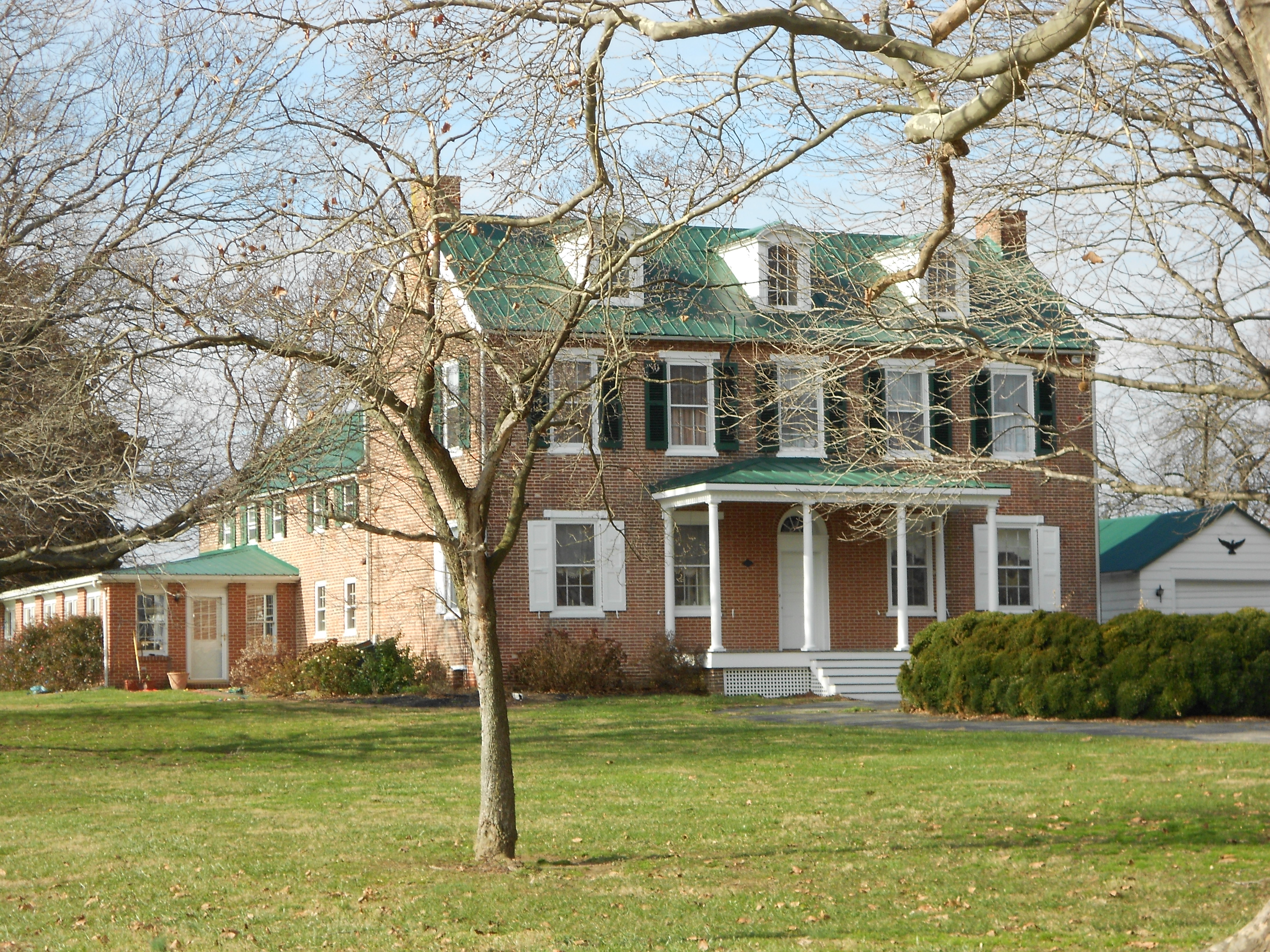
- Linden Hill, December 2011

- Location within Delaware Location within the United States
- Location: 34 N. DuPont Highway, St. Georges, Delaware
- Coordinates: 39°33′48″N 75°39′20″W
- Area: 4.2 acres (1.7 ha)
- Built: 1836
- Architectural style: Greek Revival, Other, Peach mansion
- MPS: Red Lion Hundred MRA
- NRHP reference No.: 82002356
- Added to NRHP: April 8, 1982

Linden Hill is a historic home located at St. Georges, New Castle County, Delaware. It was built in 1836, and is a 2 1/2-story, five bay brick dwelling with a center hall plan. It has long kitchen wing set at a right angle to the main house. The front facade features a three bay porch with a hipped roof. The interior features Greek Revival style details. Also on the property are a contributing frame barn and shed.

It was added to the National Register of Historic Places in 1982.
