= Odessa Historic District =

Historic district in Delaware, US

- U.S. National Register of Historic Places
- U.S. Historic district
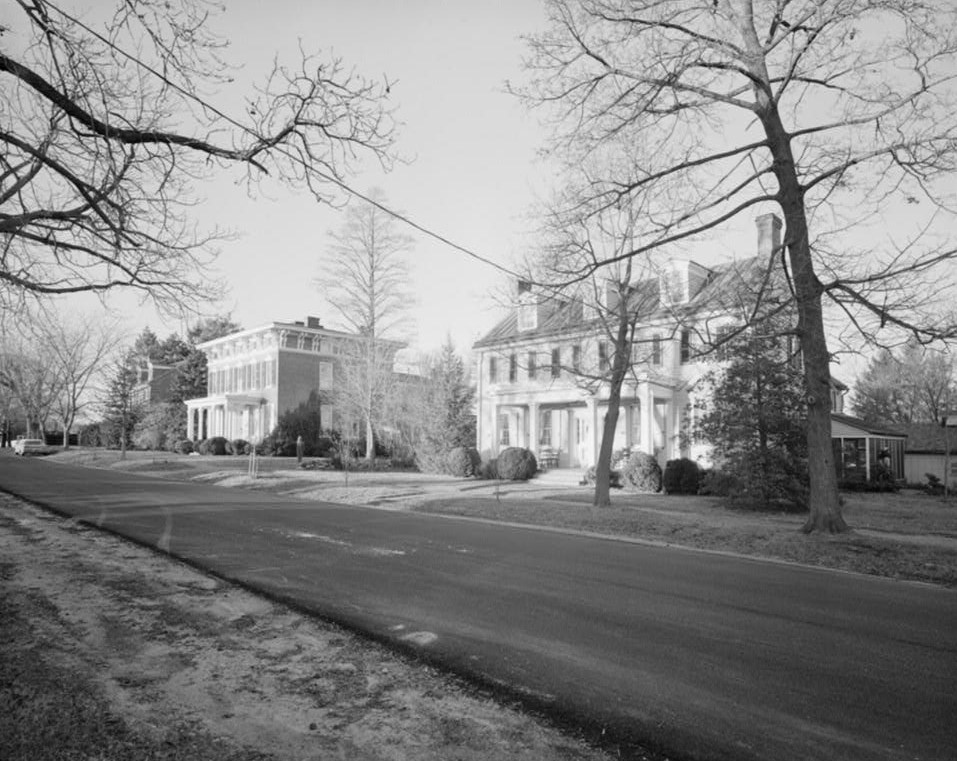
- Houses on High Street in 1958

- Location within Delaware Location within the United States
- Location: Bounded roughly by Appoquinimink Creek on the southeast, High St. on the northeast, 4th St. on the northwest, and Main St. on the southwest, Odessa, Delaware
- Coordinates: 39°27′14″N 75°39′23″W
- Architect: Multiple
- Architectural style: Federal, Italian Villa, Late Victorian (original); Greek Revival, Italianate, Federal (increase)
- MPS: African-American Resources in Delaware MPS (AD)
- NRHP reference No.: 71000227; 84000846 (increase)
- Added to NRHP: June 21, 1971; August 9, 1984 (increase)

Odessa Historic District is a national historic district located at Odessa in New Castle County, Delaware, United States. It encompasses 82 contributing buildings in the central business district and surrounding residential areas in the shipping and trading center of Odessa. It includes a mix of commercial and residential buildings primarily dating to the 18th and 19th century. The oldest building is the Collins-Sharp House (c. 1700). Other notable buildings include the Judge Lore House (c. 1830), Brick Hotel (1822), the Davis Store (1824), Cyrus Polk House (1853), Zoar ME Church (1881), Wilson-Warner House (c. 1769), Academy building (1844), Red Men Lodge (1894), and Old St. Paul's Methodist Episcopal parsonage. Also located in the district and separately listed are the Appoquinimink Friends Meetinghouse, Corbit-Sharp House, and Old St. Paul's Methodist Episcopal Church.

It was listed on the National Register of Historic Places in 1971, then increased in 1984.

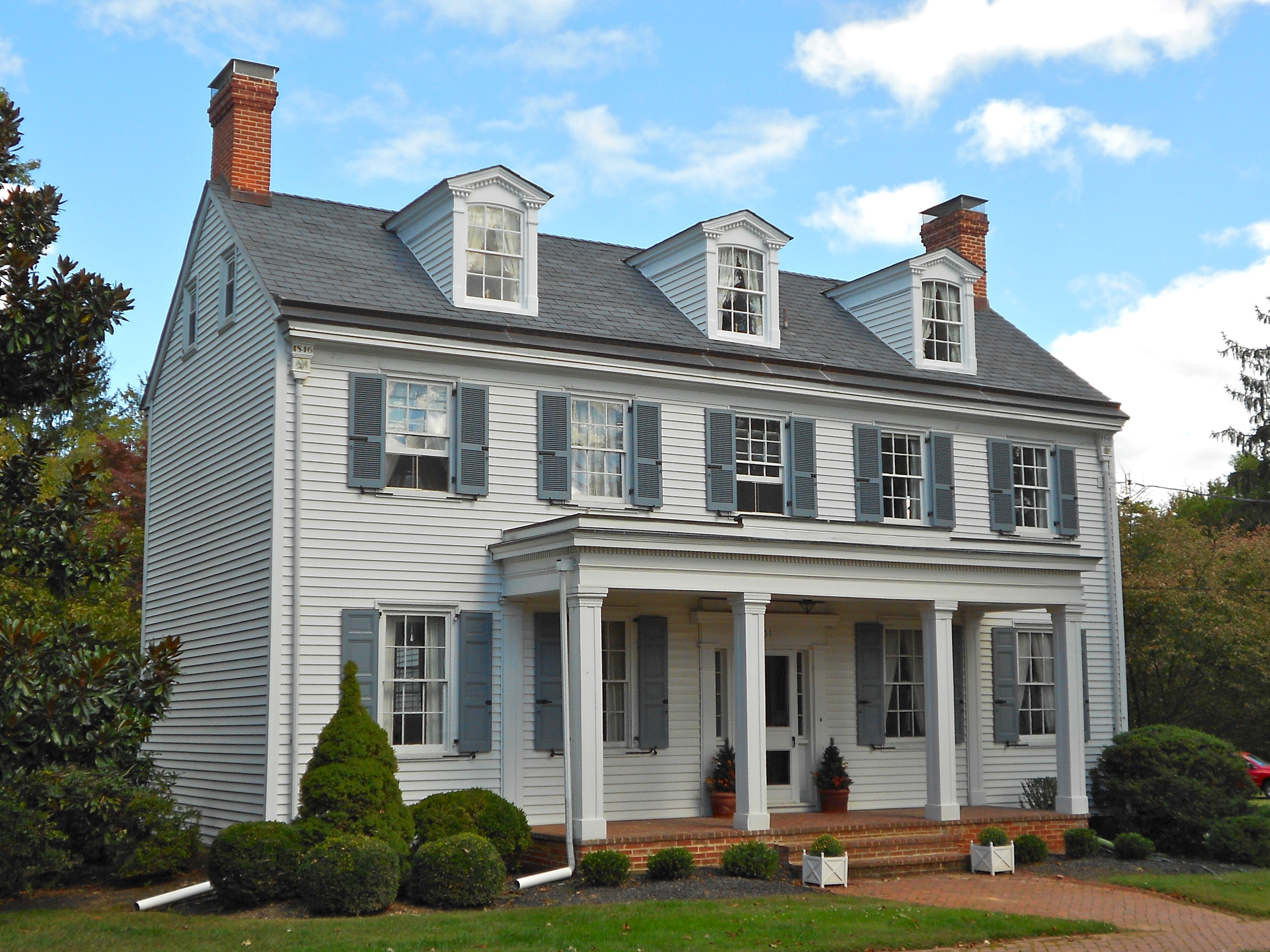
301 High St.

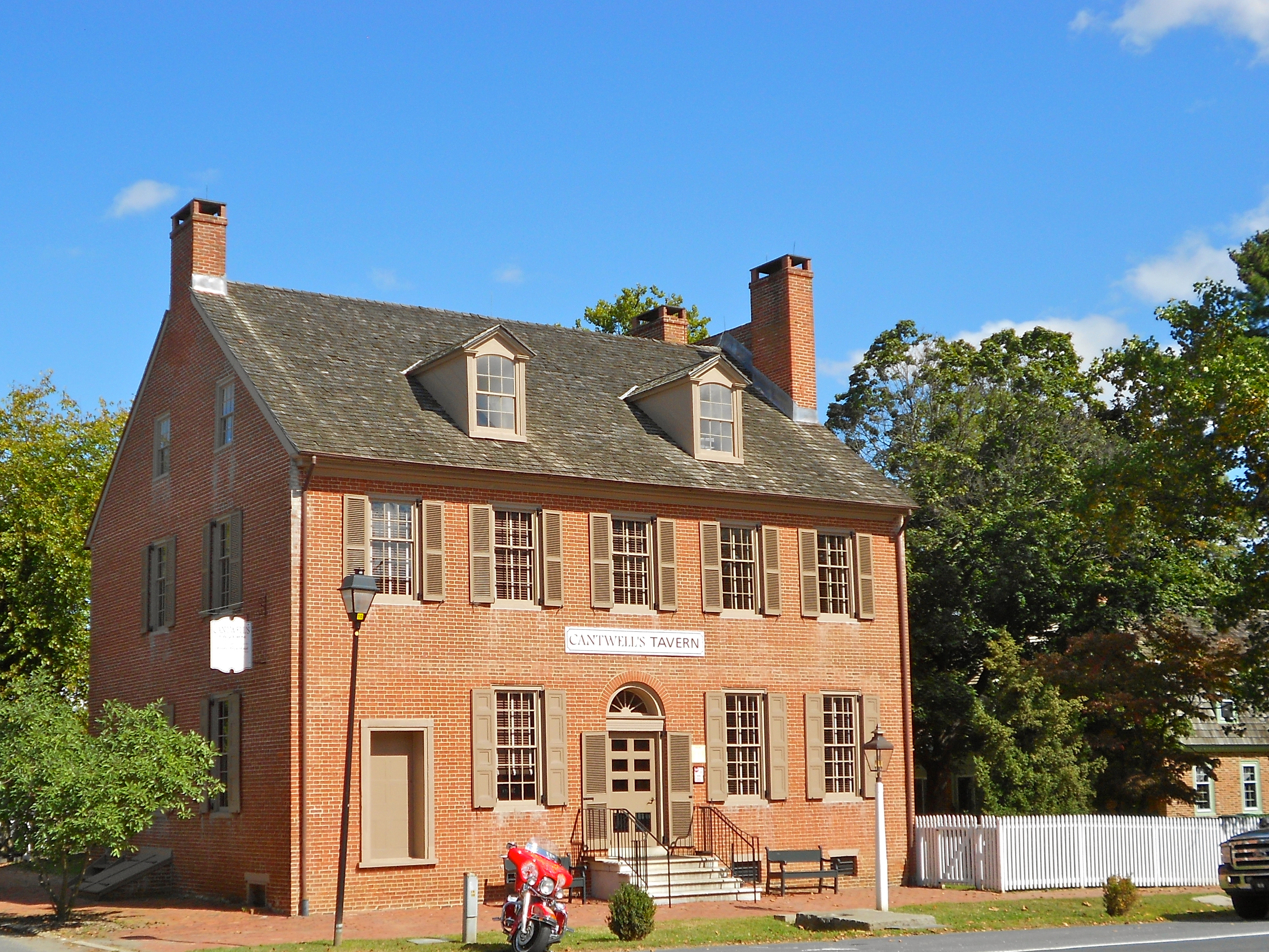
Cantwells Tavern

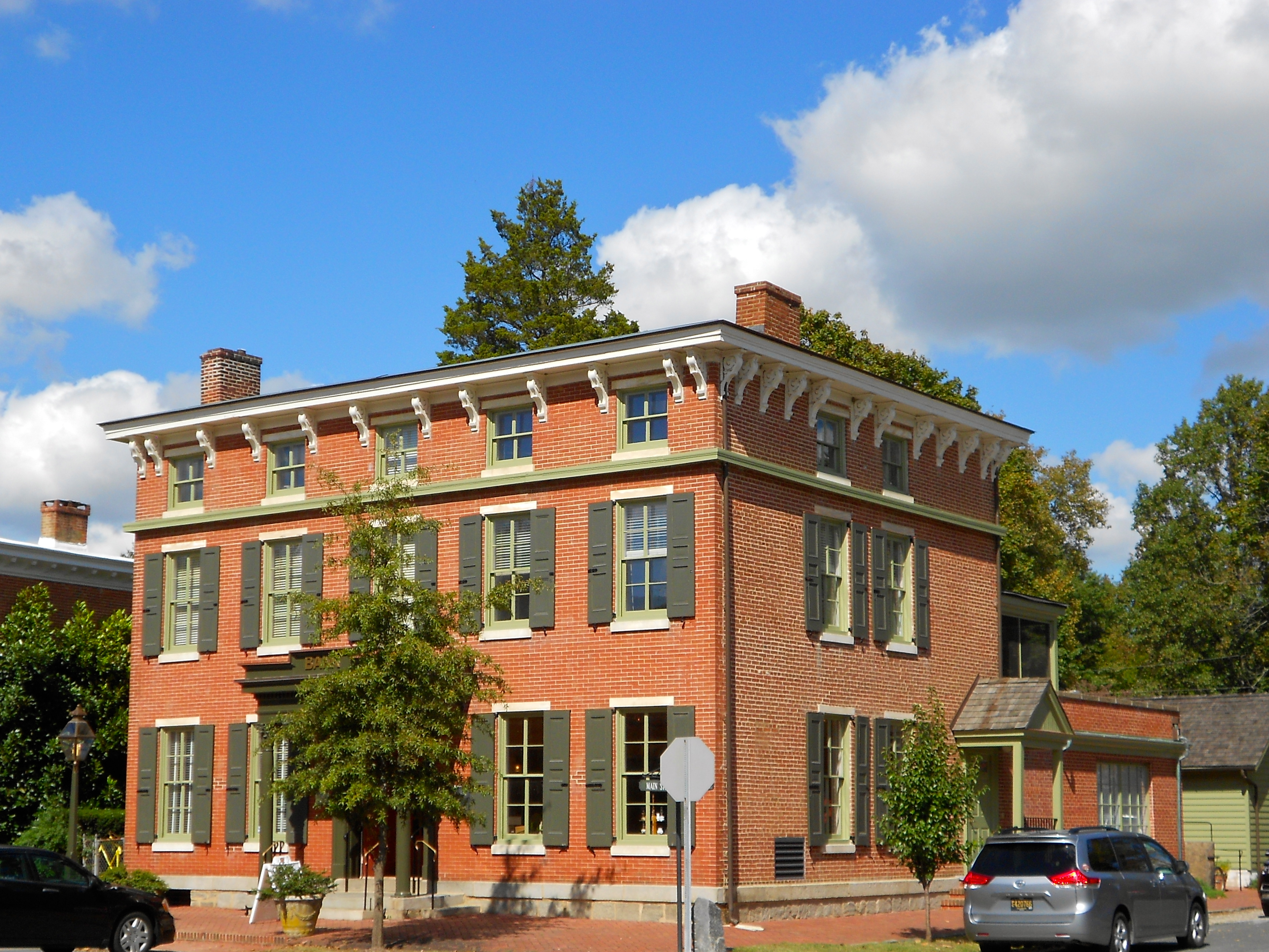
Bank on Main St.

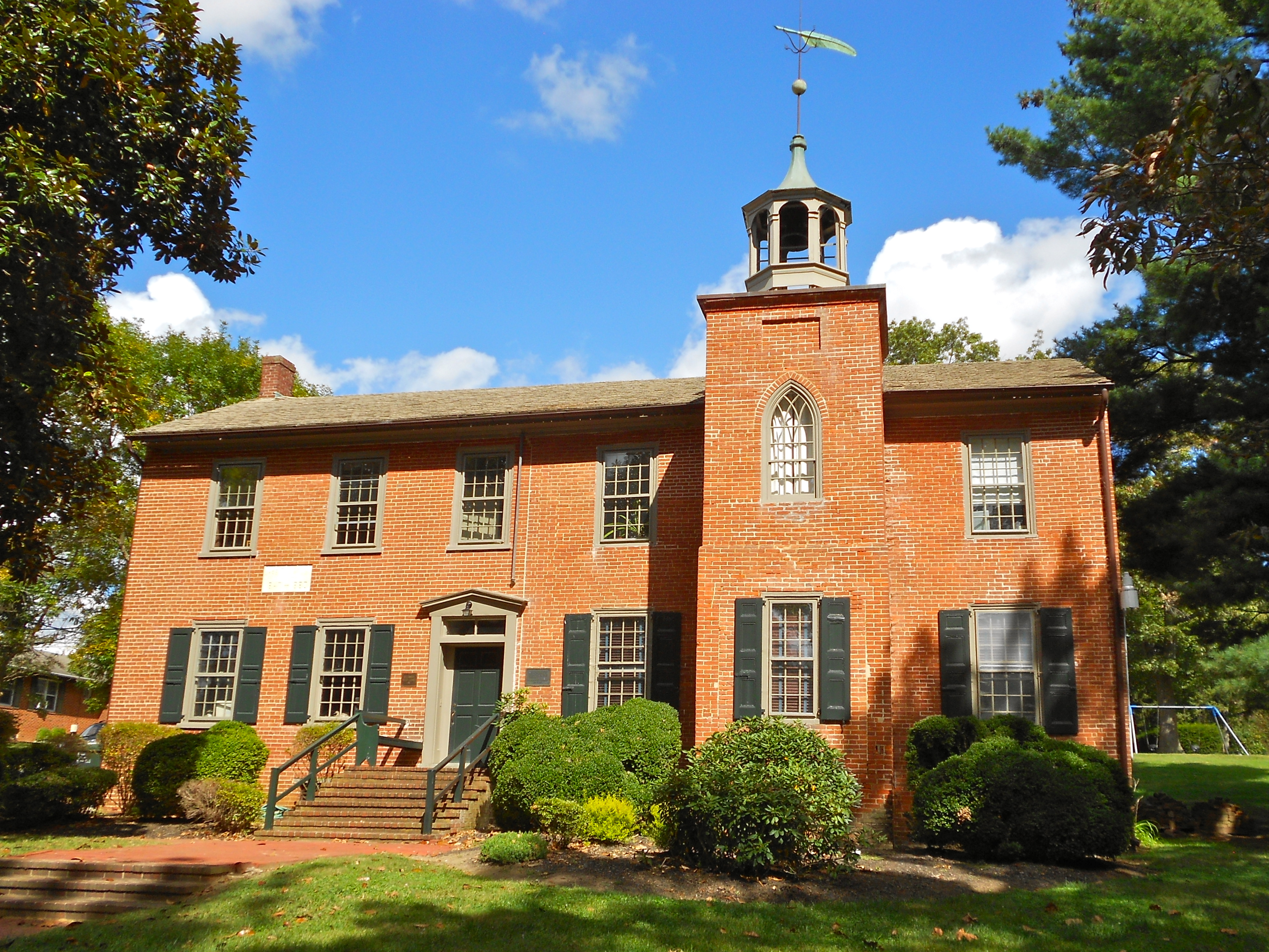
Old Academy
