= Saint Georges, Delaware =

Unincorporated community in Delaware, United States

- Unincorporated community Census-designated place
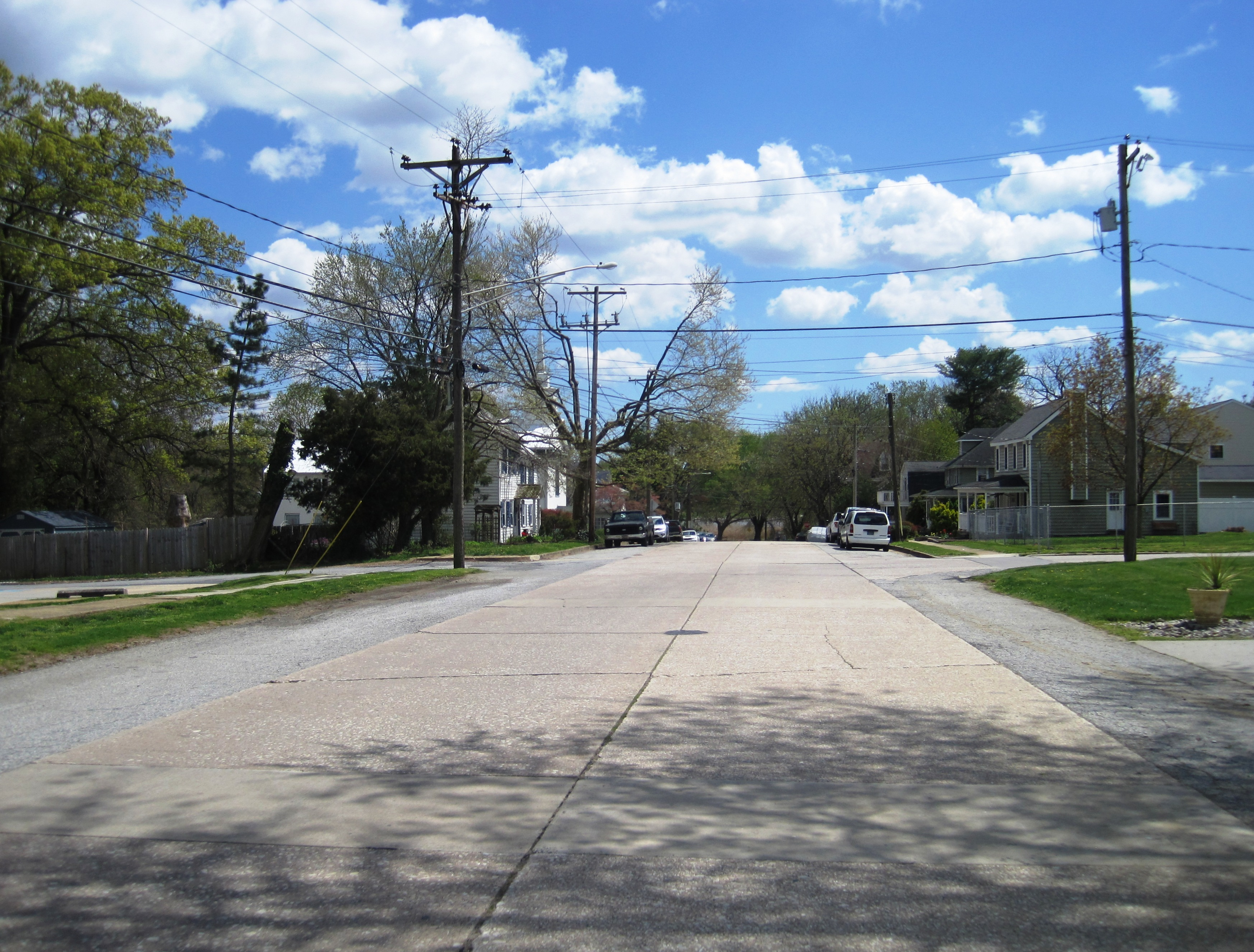
- Community as shown along Broad Street in April 2021

- Location within the state of Delaware Saint Georges, Delaware (the United States)
- Coordinates: 39°33′18″N 75°39′01″W
- Country: United States
- State: Delaware
- County: New Castle

Area
  - Total: 1.45 sq mi (3.76 km^{2})
  - Land: 1.38 sq mi (3.57 km^{2})
  - Water: 0.069 sq mi (0.18 km^{2})
- Elevation: 16 ft (4.9 m)

Population (2020)
  - Total: 1,957
  - Density: 1,419.2/sq mi (547.96/km^{2})
- Time zone: UTC-5 (Eastern (EST))
  - Summer (DST): UTC-4 (EDT)
- ZIP code: 19733
- Area code: 302
- FIPS code: 10-63800
- GNIS feature ID: 214574

Saint Georges is an unincorporated community, former municipality, and census-designated place (CDP) situated on the Chesapeake and Delaware Canal in New Castle County, Delaware, United States, approximately midway between the Delaware River and the Chesapeake Bay.

== History ==
St. Georges was settled before 1730 at the head of the St. Georges Creek. A tavern was built in 1735 and King's Highway was constructed through the settlement in 1762. St. Georges was incorporated as a town in 1825. After being divided by the Chesapeake and Delaware Canal and then bypassed by a newer bridge, the town asked to have their charter revoked by the state in 1940. The community has at least one civic association, the North Saint Georges Civic Association which represents the community to the New Castle County Council.

The Senator William V. Roth Jr. Bridge (Delaware Route 1) passes just west of the community. It is the only cable-stayed bridge in the Philadelphia metropolitan area and one of the first in the nation. It opened in 1995 as a replacement to the still standing St. Georges Bridge, which carries U.S. Route 13 over the community of St. Georges and the canal. The St. Georges Bridge is in turn a replacement for a former lift bridge that sat in the middle of town. That bridge—built in 1923—was knocked down on January 10, 1939, by the 6,000-ton freighter Waukegan. The freighter lost control, hit the north tower of the bridge, and caused it to collapse. Two people died: the bridge tender and the bridge electrician. One other bridge spanned the C & D Canal before the lift bridge. It was a small pedestrian swing bridge that crossed over the former Saint Georges Locks. It was destroyed when the locks were dismantled during the first widening and deepening (to sea level) of the canal.

Bloomfield, the W. Casperson House, Linden Hill, Ethel S. Roy House, St. Georges Cemetery Caretaker's House, St. Georges Presbyterian Church, Starl House, Sutton House (St. Georges, Delaware), and the North Saint Georges Historic District are listed on the National Register of Historic Places.

The community is located in New Castle County District 12 and is represented to the county council by Councilman James W. (Bill) Bell.

== Demographics ==
Historical population
Census	Pop.	Note	%±
1850	199		—
1860	269		35.2%
1870	265		−1.5%
1880	338		27.5%
1890	323		−4.4%
1900	325		0.6%
1910	264		−18.8%
1920	245		−7.2%
1930	265		8.2%
1940	339		27.9%
2020	1,957		—
U.S. Decennial Census

St. Georges first appeared as a census designated place in the 2020 U.S. census.

=== Racial and ethnic composition ===
St. Georges CDP, Delaware – Racial and ethnic composition Note: the US Census treats Hispanic/Latino as an ethnic category. This table excludes Latinos from the racial categories and assigns them to a separate category. Hispanics/Latinos may be of any race.
Race / Ethnicity (NH = Non-Hispanic)	Pop 2020	2020
White alone (NH)	985	50.33%
Black or African American alone (NH)	554	28.31%
Native American or Alaska Native alone (NH)	5	0.26%
Asian alone (NH)	206	10.53%
Native Hawaiian or Pacific Islander alone (NH)	2	0.10%
Other race alone (NH)	19	0.97%
Mixed race or Multiracial (NH)	74	3.78%
Hispanic or Latino (any race)	112	5.72%
Total	1,957	100.00%

== Education ==
Saint Georges is in the Colonial School District. It operates William Penn High School.

== See also ==
- Ethel S. Roy House
