= Lee Casperson =

Physicist

Lee Wendel Casperson (born 1944) is an American physicist and engineer.

Casperson earned his bachelor of science degree from the Massachusetts Institute of Technology in 1966. He then pursued a master of science and doctorate at the California Institute of Technology, graduating in 1971. Casperson subsequently taught at the Portland State University. While at Portland, he was elected a fellow of the IEEE, as well as a fellow of the American Physical Society. He later joined the faculty of the University of North Carolina at Charlotte.

== Selected publications ==
- Casperson, Lee Wendel (2013). Patterns of Biblical Chronology. WestBow Press. ISBN 9781449779009.
