= Casperson, Minnesota =

Casperson
- Unincorporated community
- Location within Minnesota Location within the United States
- Coordinates: 48°34′34″N 95°41′14″W
- Country: United States
- State: Minnesota
- County: Roseau
- Elevation: 1,161 ft (354 m)
- Time zone: UTC-6 (Central (CST))
  - Summer (DST): UTC-5 (CDT)
- Area code: 218
- GNIS feature ID: 654635

Casperson is an unincorporated community in Roseau County, in the U.S. state of Minnesota.

== History ==
A post office called Casperson was established in 1903, and remained in operation until 1917. The community was named for two brothers who settled near the original town site.
