= Senator Casperson =

Senator Casperson may refer to:

- Carl B. Casperson (1877–1953), Wisconsin State Senate
- Tom Casperson (1959–2020), Michigan State Senate
