= St. Georges Presbyterian Church =

Historic church in Delaware, United States

- U.S. National Register of Historic Places
- U.S. Historic district – Contributing property
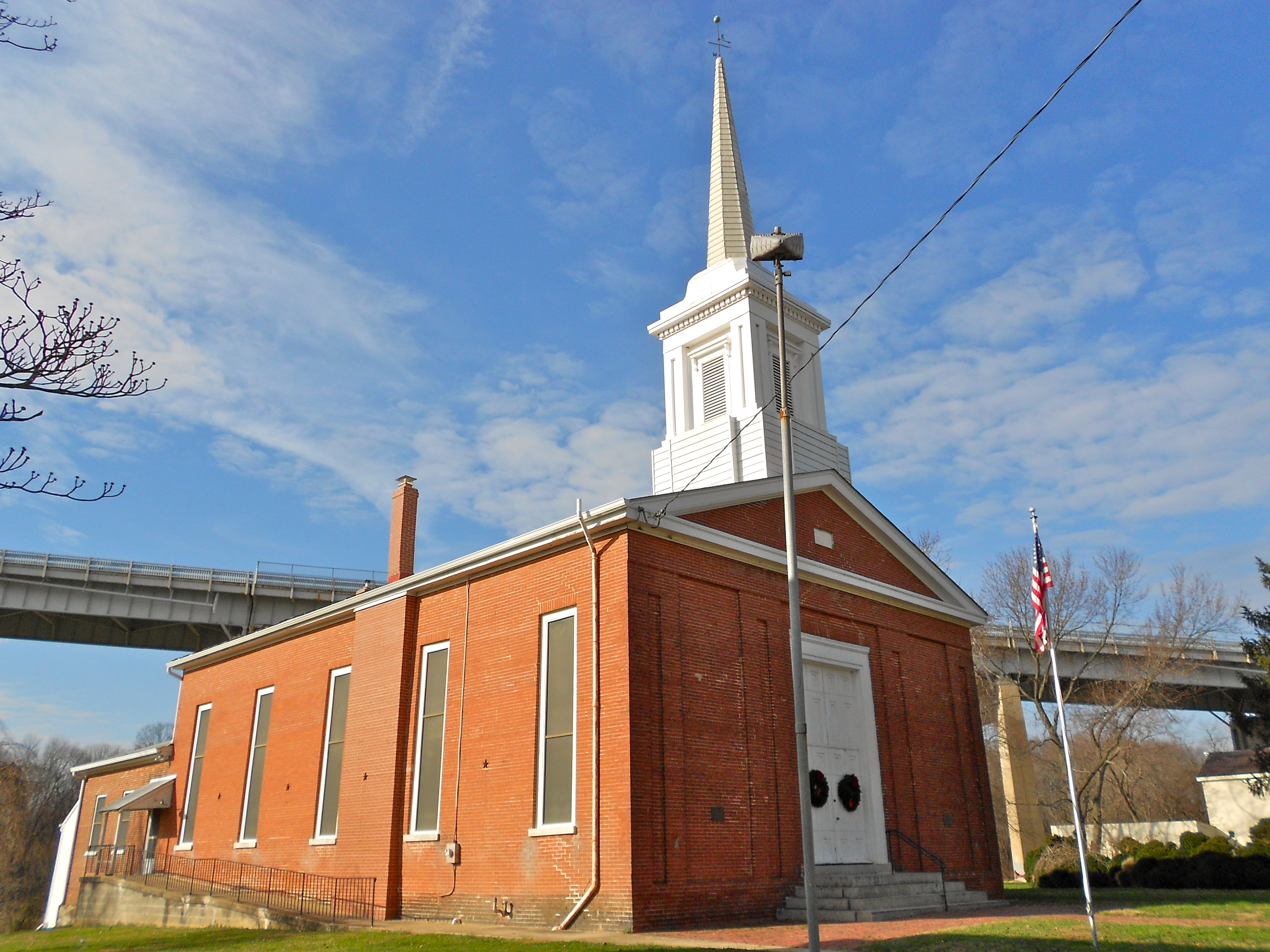
- St. Georges Presbyterian Church, December 2011

- Location within Delaware Location within the United States
- Location: 120–200 N. Main St., St. Georges, Delaware
- Coordinates: 39.55580°N 75.65185°W
- Area: 1 acre (0.40 ha)
- Built: 1844-1845
- Architect: Allen, Edward
- Architectural style: Greek Revival, Italianate
- NRHP reference No.: 84000263
- Added to NRHP: November 07, 1984

St. Georges Presbyterian Church is a historic Presbyterian church located on Main Street in St. Georges, New Castle County, Delaware. It was built in 1844, and is a one-story, brick, temple form, Greek Revival style building with a frame steeple. The main block measures 43 feet, 6 inches wide by 77 feet, 8 inches long, and sits on an uncoursed fieldstone foundation. The roof is supported by a Town lattice truss.

It was added to the National Register of Historic Places in 1984. It is located in the North Saint Georges Historic District.
