= W. Casperson House =

Historic house in Delaware, United States

- U.S. National Register of Historic Places
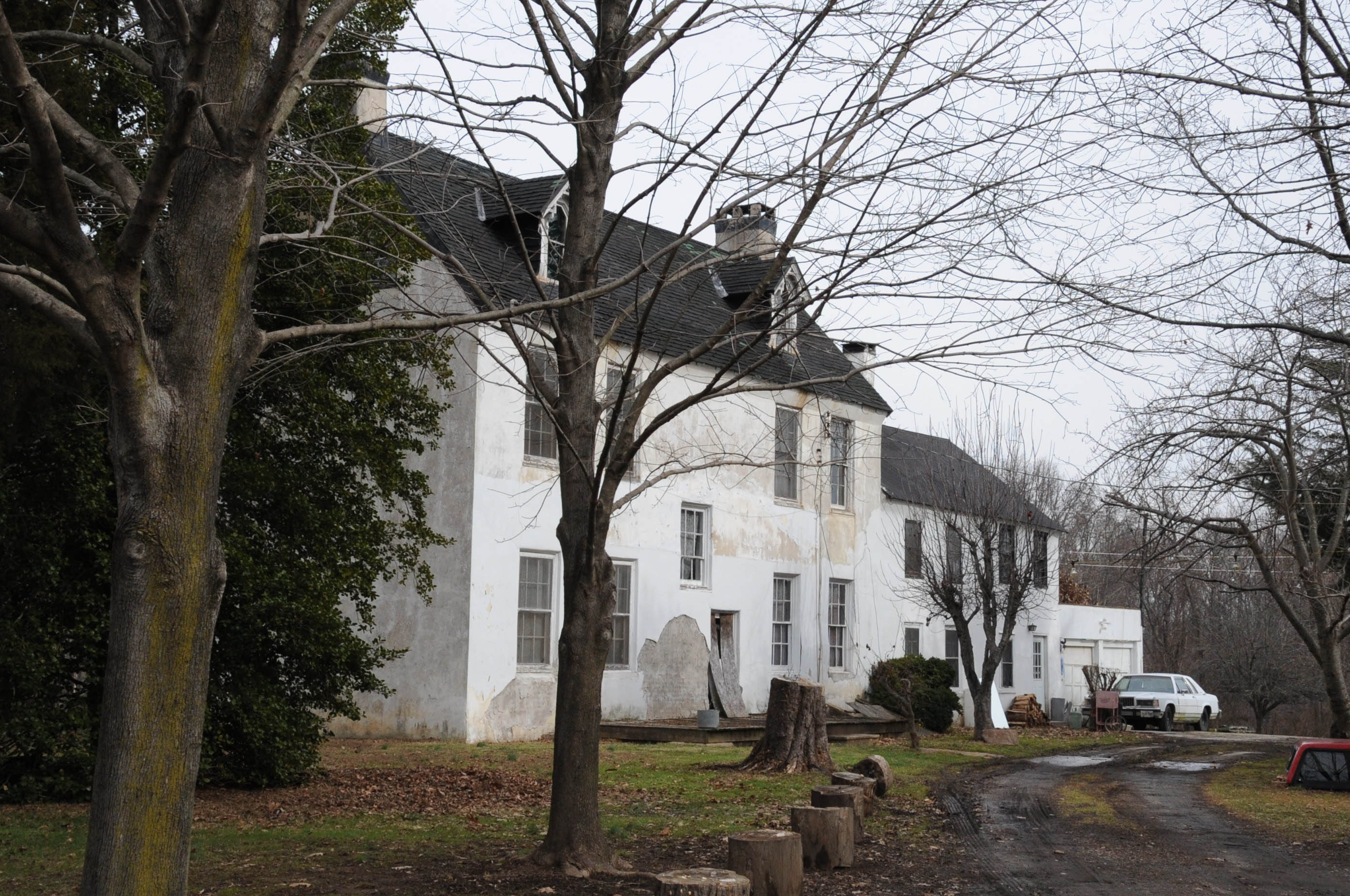

- Location within Delaware Location within the United States
- Location: 1600 Red Lion Rd., St. Georges, Delaware
- Coordinates: 39.590407°N 75.673953°W
- Area: 22 acres (8.9 ha)
- Built: c. 1835
- Architectural style: Center-hall plan
- MPS: Red Lion Hundred MRA
- NRHP reference No.: 82002355
- Added to NRHP: April 8, 1982

W. Casperson House is a historic home located at St. Georges, New Castle County, Delaware. It was built about 1835, and is a 2 1/2-story, five bay brick erection with a center hall plan. It has a low two-story wing. Both sections have a gable roof with dormers.

It was added to the National Register of Historic Places in 1982.
