= Delaware Route 299 =

Highway in Delaware, United States

Delaware Route 299

Route information
- Maintained by DelDOT
- Length: 9.77 mi (15.72 km)
- Existed: 1957–present
- Tourist routes: Harriet Tubman Underground Railroad Byway; Delaware Bayshore Byway

Major junctions
- West end: MD 282 near Warwick, MD
- US 301 Toll in Middletown; DE 15 in Middletown; DE 71 in Middletown; DE 1 Toll in Middletown; US 13 in Odessa
- East end: DE 9 in Mathews Corners

Location
- Country: United States
- State: Delaware
- Counties: New Castle

Highway system
- Delaware State Route System; List; Byways
← I-295	→ DE 300

Delaware Route 299 (DE 299) is a 9.77-mile-long (15.72 km) state highway in New Castle County, Delaware. It runs from Maryland Route 282 (MD 282) at the Maryland state line east of Warwick, Maryland to DE 9 in Mathews Corners, traveling through Middletown and Odessa. The route intersects the U.S. Route 301 (US 301) toll road, DE 15, and DE 71 in Middletown, the DE 1 toll road east of Middletown, and US 13 in Odessa. The highway travels through a mix of suburban development and some farmland.

DE 299 was originally designated as DE 4 in 1938, traveling as far east as US 13 in Odessa. By 1957, DE 4 became DE 299 to match MD 299 (now MD 282) and was extended east to DE 9 in 1959. Over the years, several different highways had followed the DE 299 alignment including DE 71 west of Middletown between 1959 and 1987, US 301N between Middletown and Odessa from 1959 to 1971, and US 301 west of Middletown between 1959 and 2019. In 2008, a widening of DE 299 in the western part of Middletown began; it was completed in November 2010. A portion of the route west of Middletown was realigned in 2017 as a result of the construction of the US 301 toll road.

== Route description ==
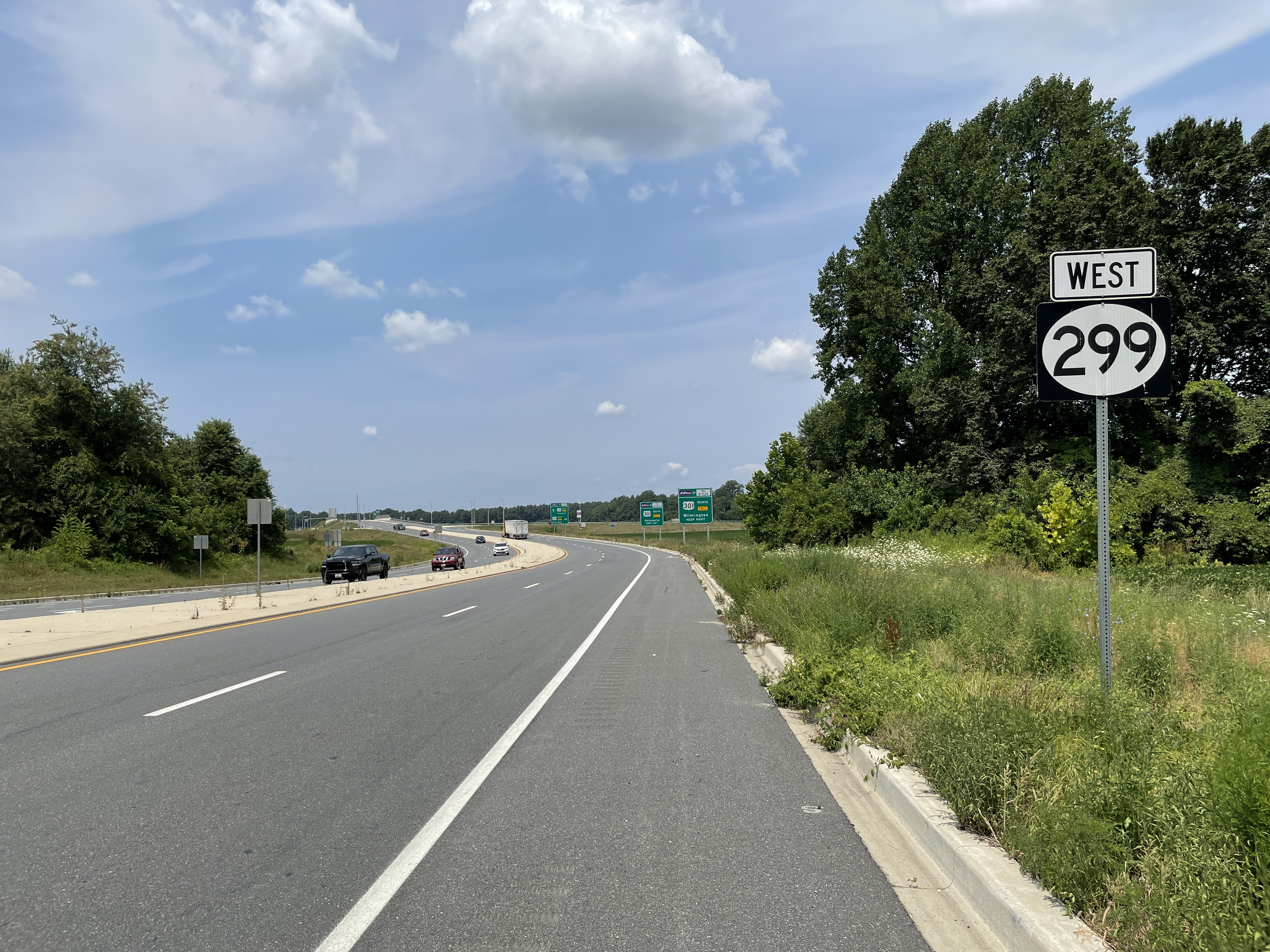
DE 299 westbound past DE 15 in Middletown

DE 299 heads east from the Maryland state line on two-lane undivided Warwick Road, passing through farmland. At the state line, the road continues west into Maryland as MD 282. Shortly after the state line, the route curves north, with US 301 toll road parallel to the east. The road enters the town of Middletown and turns southeast, widening to a four-lane divided highway as it comes to a diamond interchange with US 301, where the name changes to Levels Road, before reaching an intersection with DE 15. At this point, DE 299 turns northeast and becomes concurrent with DE 15, heading northeast on four-lane divided Middletown Warwick Road. From here, the roadway enters the commercial western part of Middletown. At an intersection, the two routes split, with DE 15 heading northwest on Bunker Hill Road, DE 299 turning east onto West Main Street, and Middletown Warwick Road continuing north. The route narrows to a two-lane undivided road and heads east across the Delmarva Central Railroad's Delmarva Subdivision line at-grade into the downtown area of Middletown. In the center of town, DE 299 intersects DE 71 (Broad Street).

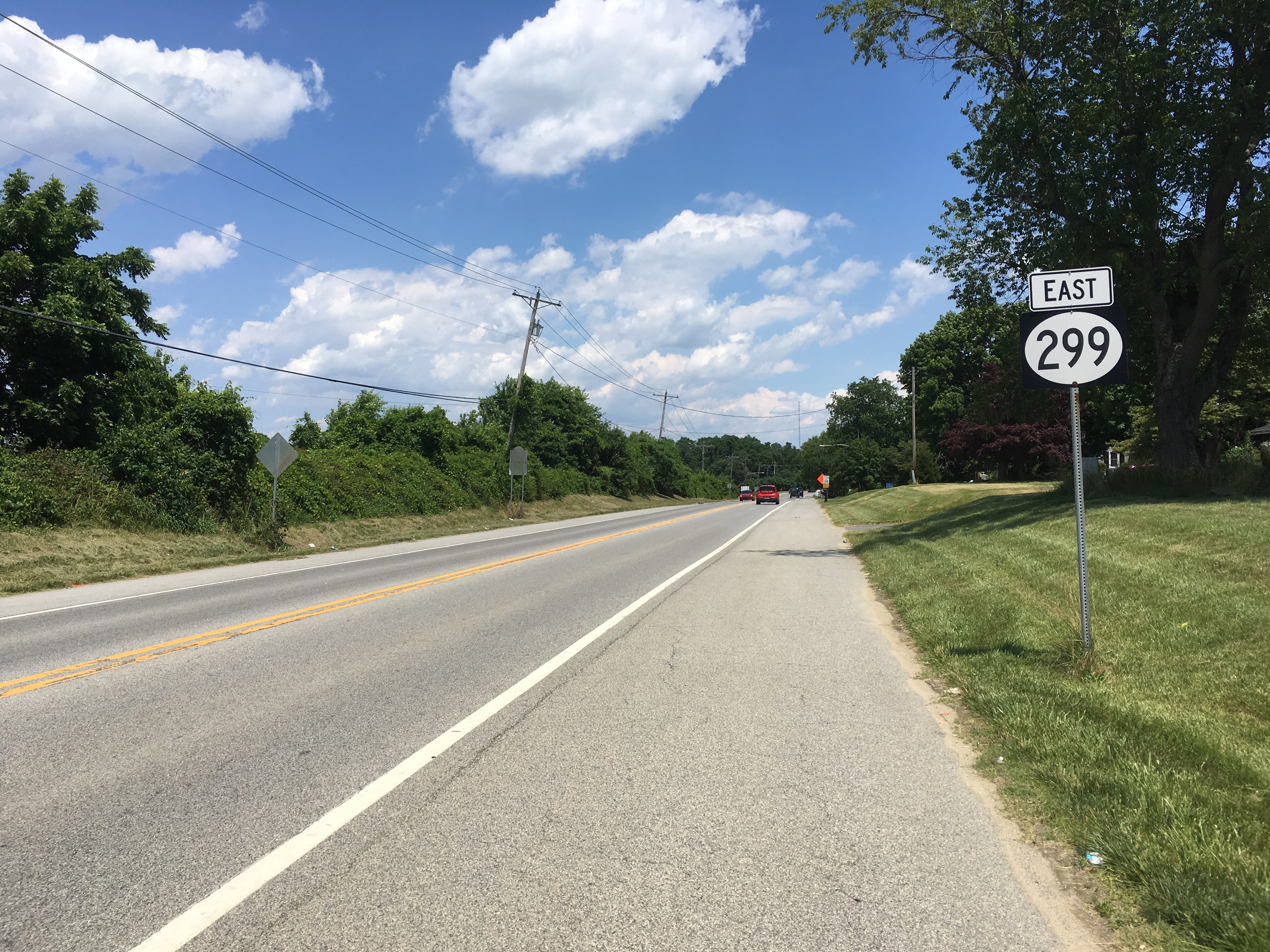
DE 299 eastbound past the DE 1 interchange near Odessa

After running through the downtown area, the route becomes East Main Street and heads east through suburban commercial development in the eastern part of Middletown, passing to the north of Middletown High School and becoming Middletown Odessa Road. The roadway heads south of the Christiana Care Middletown Free-standing Emergency Department before it becomes a divided highway, passing south of a park and ride lot and intersecting the DE 1 toll road at a diamond interchange on the eastern border of Middletown. Following this interchange, DE 299 becomes undivided again and heads east through a mix of farms and homes into the town of Odessa, where it is called Main Street and curves southeast. In Odessa, the route is lined with homes and intersects US 13, which is split onto 5th Street northbound and 6th Street southbound. Following this intersection, the road runs through the Odessa Historic District. DE 299 crosses the Appoquinimink River out of Odessa and heads to the southeast on Old State Road into housing developments. The route curves south before makes a turn southeast onto Taylors Bridge Road and ends a short distance later at DE 9 in the community of Mathews Corners. At this intersection, DE 9 heads northeast on Thomas Landing Road and southeast along Taylors Bridge Road.

Portions of DE 299 are designated as part of the Delaware Byways system. The section between Silver Lake Road in Middletown and DE 9 is part of the Harriet Tubman Underground Railroad Byway while the section between US 13 in Odessa and DE 9 is a spur of the Delaware Bayshore Byway, which is also a National Scenic Byway. DE 299 has an annual average daily traffic count ranging from a high of 18,470 vehicles along Main Street in Middletown to a low of 727 vehicles at the eastern terminus at DE 9. The portion of DE 299 concurrent with DE 15 is part of the National Highway System.

== History ==
Delaware Route 4
- Location: Near Warwick, Maryland–Odessa
- Length: 8.08 mi (13.00 km)
- Existed: 1938–1957

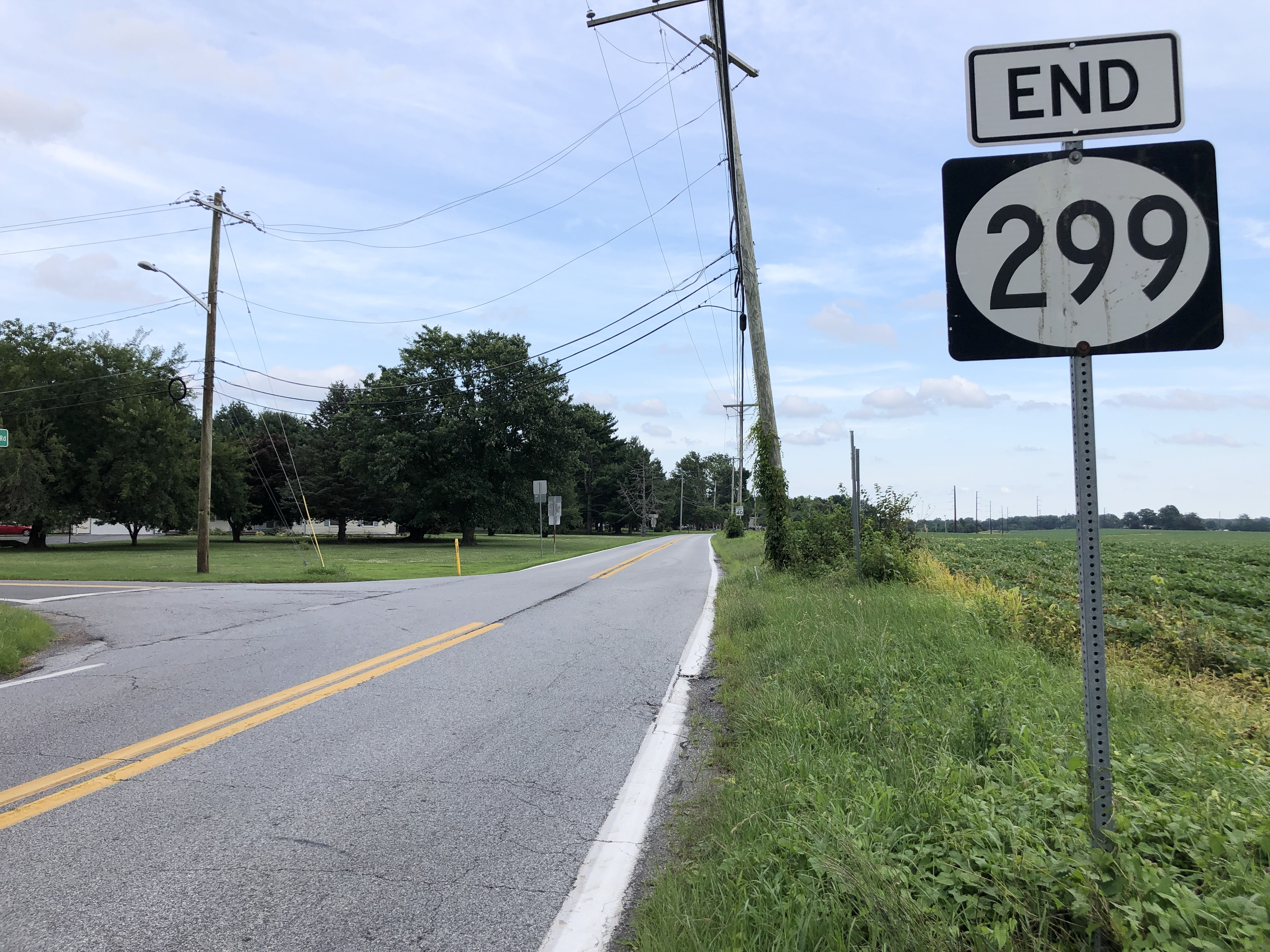
Eastern terminus of DE 299 at DE 9 in Mathews Corners

By 1920, what is now DE 299 existed as an unimproved county road. This county road was paved by 1924. The present-day alignment of DE 299 became a state highway by 1935. The current DE 299 was originally designated as DE 4 in 1938, running between the Maryland state line and US 13 in Odessa. By 1957, DE 4 was renumbered to DE 299 to match MD 299 (now MD 282) across the state line and DE 71 was designated concurrent with most of the route west of Middletown. US 301 was designated along the DE 71/DE 299 concurrency in 1959 while US 301N was designated between DE 71 and US 13. Also at this time, DE 299 was extended east to DE 9. The US 301N designation was removed between Middletown and Odessa in 1971. DE 71 was rerouted off US 301/DE 299 by 1987. By 1994, DE 15 was designated to follow a portion of US 301/DE 299 west of Middletown.

In July 2008, a widening project began on US 301/DE 299 between United Drive and the east end of the concurrency. This widening to four lanes was completed in November 2010. On July 15, 2017, DE 299 was realigned near the Maryland border as a result of construction of the US 301 toll road. The concurrency with US 301 west of Middletown was removed when the US 301 toll road opened on January 10, 2019. There are plans to reconstruct and widen DE 299 between Catherine Street and DE 1 in Middletown, with the section between Catherine Street and Cleaver Farms Road/Dickenson Boulevard to be widened into a three-lane road with a center left-turn lane and the section between Cleaver Farms Road/Dickenson Boulevard and DE 1 to be widened into a four-lane divided highway. Construction on the widening project began on July 6, 2021 and is expected be completed in the later part of 2023.

== Major intersections ==
The entire route is in New Castle County.

Location	mi	km	Destinations	Notes
	0.00	0.00	MD 282 west (Main Street) – Warwick, Cecilton	Maryland state line; western terminus
Middletown			US 301 Toll – Wilmington, Annapolis	US 301 exit 2; E-ZPass or toll-by-plate
Middletown	3.13	5.04	DE 15 south (Levels Road)	West end of DE 15 overlap
Middletown	4.35	7.00	DE 15 north (Bunker Hill Road)	East end of DE 15 overlap
Middletown	4.68	7.53	DE 71 (Broad Street)	
Middletown			DE 1 Toll – Wilmington, Smyrna, Dover, Beaches	DE 1 exit 136
Odessa	7.99	12.86	US 13 south (Dupont Parkway/6th Street) – Townsend, Smyrna	
Odessa	8.08	13.00	US 13 north (Dupont Parkway/5th Street) – New Jersey, Wilmington	
Mathews Corners	9.77	15.72	DE 9 (Taylors Bridge Road/Thomas Landing Road) – Wilmington	Eastern terminus
1.000 mi = 1.609 km; 1.000 km = 0.621 mi: Concurrency terminus; Electronic toll collection
