= Odessa, Delaware =

- Town
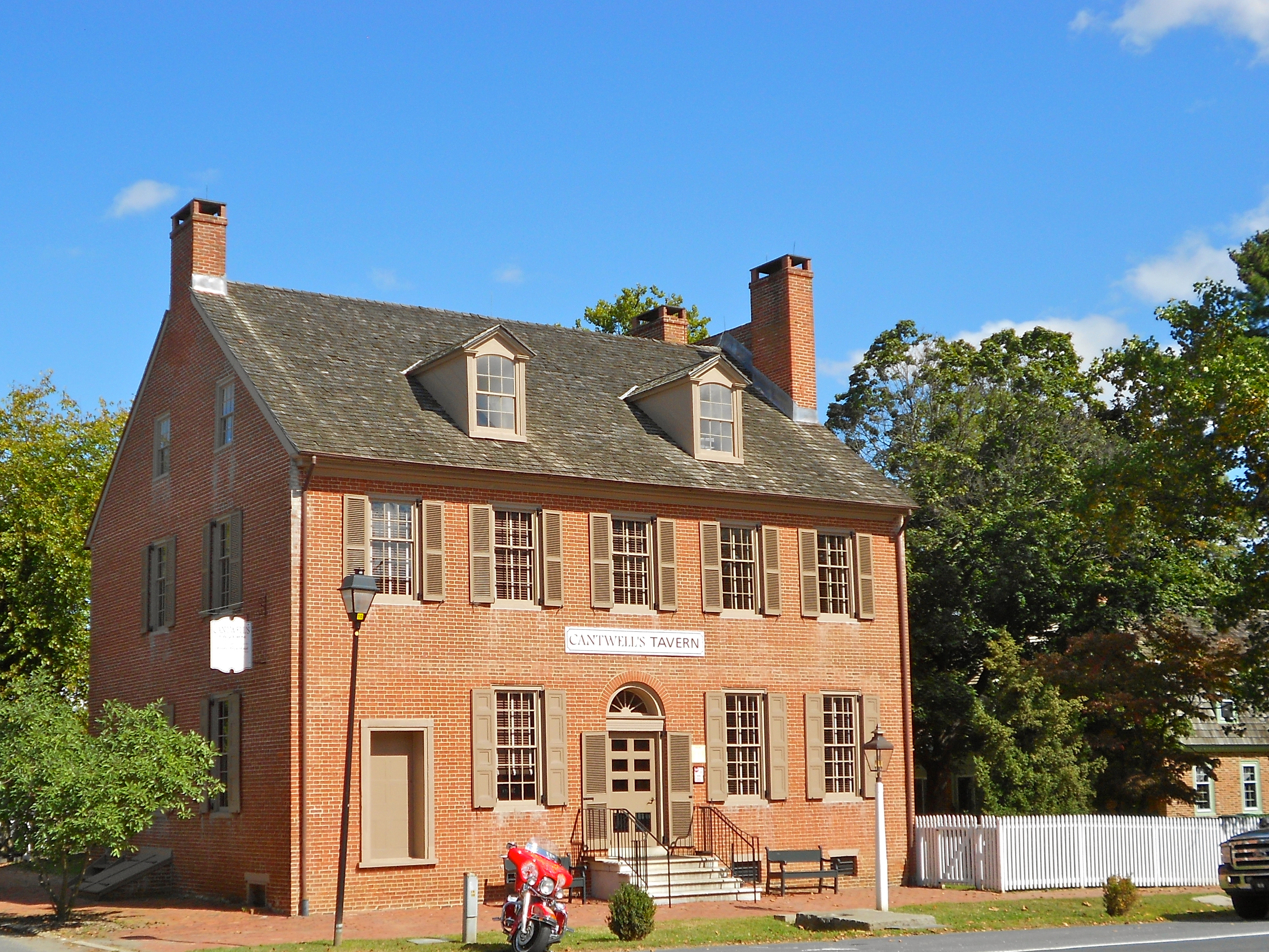
- Cantwells Tavern

- Flag
- Etymology: Ukrainian port city of Odesa
- Location of Odessa in New Castle County, Delaware

- Location of Odessa in Delaware Odessa (the United States)
- Coordinates: 39°27′26″N 75°39′41″W
- Country: United States
- State: Delaware
- County: New Castle

Government
  - Mayor: Harvey C. Smith, Jr.

Area
  - Total: 0.52 sq mi (1.35 km^{2})
  - Land: 0.51 sq mi (1.31 km^{2})
  - Water: 0.015 sq mi (0.04 km^{2})
- Elevation: 52 ft (16 m)

Population (2020)
  - Total: 366
  - Density: 721.5/sq mi (278.59/km^{2})
- Time zone: UTC−5 (Eastern (EST))
  - Summer (DST): UTC−4 (EDT)
- ZIP code: 19730
- Area code: 302
- FIPS code: 10-54050
- GNIS feature ID: 214404
- Website: www.odessa.delaware.gov

Odessa is a town in New Castle County, Delaware, United States. As of the 2020 census, Odessa had a population of 366. Founded as Cantwell's Bridge in the 18th century, the name was changed in the 19th century, after the Ukrainian port city of the same name. Today a significant part of the town is a historic district list on the National Register of Historic Places.

== History ==
Odessa was originally known as Cantwell's Bridge. In 1721, a son of Captain Edmund Cantwell opened a toll bridge over the Appoquinimink Creek at this location. Cantwell's Bridge became an important port that shipped wheat, corn, tobacco, and produce down the creek to the Delaware Bay, where it traveled to distant ports. The town was also home to tanneries that produced leather goods. Cantwell's Bridge would continue to prosper as an agricultural port into the 19th century. In 1855, the grain trade collapsed after the Delaware Railroad was built to the west through Middletown. The railroad was originally proposed to be built through Cantwell's Bridge but the merchants and vessel owners in the town opposed. Following this, the town was renamed to Odessa after the port city of Odessa in the Russian Empire (present-day Ukraine) in an effort to keep the town alive as a major port. The town saw a slight boom during the American Civil War.

== Geography ==
Odessa is located at 39°27′26″N 75°39′41″W (39.4573340°N, 75.6613184°W), along the Appoquinimink River.

According to the United States Census Bureau, the town has a total area of 0.4 square miles (1.0 km^{2}), of which 0.4 square miles (1.0 km^{2}) is land and 2.22% is water.

== Infrastructure ==
=== Transportation ===
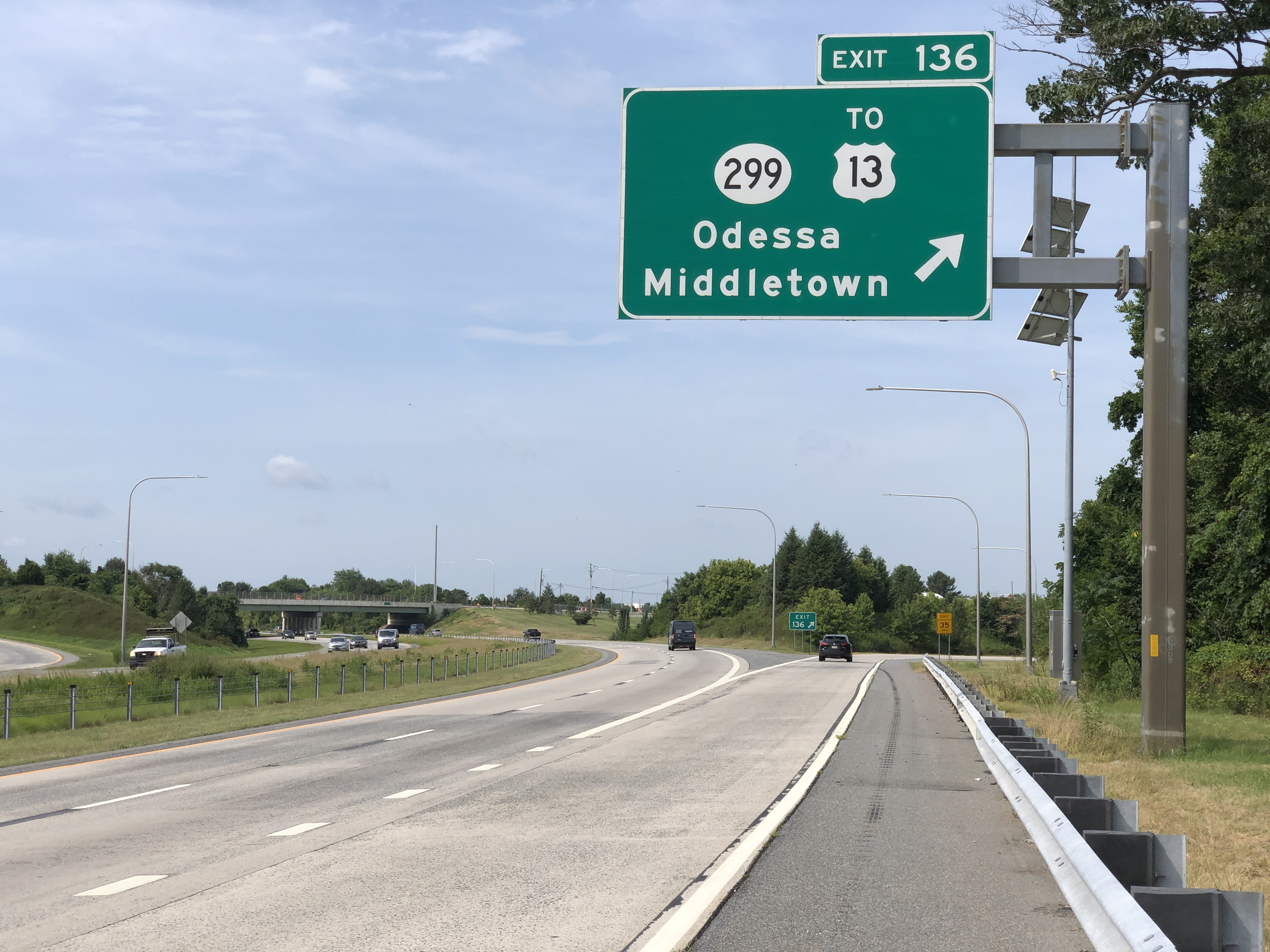
DE Route 1 southbound in Odessa

The Delaware Route 1 toll road is the most significant highway passing through Odessa. Its route follows the western edge of town, with an interchange with DE 299 that serves Odessa and neighboring Middletown. U.S. Route 13 passes through the heart of Odessa along Dupont Parkway, which follows 5th Street northbound and 6th Street southbound. Delaware Route 299 is the main east–west route in Odessa, passing through the town along Main Street. DART First State provides bus service to Odessa at a park and ride lot west of the town near the interchange between DE 1 and DE 299. The park and ride lot serves the Route 43 and Route 63 buses to Middletown, the Route 301 bus to Wilmington and Dover, and the seasonal Route 305 "Beach Connection" bus to Lewes.

=== Utilities ===
Delmarva Power, a subsidiary of Exelon, provides electricity to Odessa. Chesapeake Utilities provides natural gas to the town. Trash and recycling collection is provided by the town.

== Education ==
Odessa is within the Appoquinimink School District. Odessa High School is nearby.MOT Charter School is an area charter school.

Middletown School District 60 and Odessa School District 61 merged into the Appoquinimink district effective July 1, 1969.

Corbit-Calloway Memorial Library is in Odessa. It was established in 1847.

== Demographics ==
Historical population
Census	Pop.	Note	%±
1850	501		—
1860	686		36.9%
1870	695		1.3%
1880	675		−2.9%
1890	640		−5.2%
1900	575		−10.2%
1910	585		1.7%
1920	435		−25.6%
1930	385		−11.5%
1940	391		1.6%
1950	467		19.4%
1960	526		12.6%
1970	547		4.0%
1980	384		−29.8%
1990	303		−21.1%
2000	286		−5.6%
2010	364		27.3%
2020	366		0.5%
U.S. Decennial Census

At the 2000 census there were 286 people, 119 households, and 84 families living in the town. The population density was 652.6 inhabitants per square mile (252.0/km^{2}). There were 127 housing units at an average density of 289.8 per square mile (111.9/km^{2}). The racial makeup of the town was 94.06% White, 5.24% African American, 0.35% Pacific Islander, and 0.35% from two or more races. Hispanic or Latino of any race were 1.05%.

Of the 119 households 27.7% had children under the age of 18 living with them, 54.6% were married couples living together, 12.6% had a female householder with no husband present, and 29.4% were non-families. 22.7% of households were one person and 10.9% were one person aged 65 or older. The average household size was 2.40 and the average family size was 2.80.

The age distribution was 19.9% under the age of 18, 5.9% from 18 to 24, 26.9% from 25 to 44, 29.4% from 45 to 64, and 17.8% 65 or older. The median age was 42 years. For every 100 females, there were 95.9 males. For every 100 females age 18 and over, there were 90.8 males.

The median household income was $53,269 and the median family income was $55,938. Males had a median income of $31,875 versus $33,750 for females. The per capita income for the town was $27,662. None of the families and 3.2% of the population were living below the poverty line.

== See also ==
- Odessa Historic District
