= List of places in Delaware =

This list of current cities, towns, unincorporated communities, counties, and other recognized places in the U.S. state of Delaware also includes information on the number and names of counties in which the place lies, and its lower and upper zip code bounds, if applicable.

| Name of place | Number of counties | Principal county | Lower zip code | Upper zip code |
|---|---|---|---|---|
| Kent County | 1 | Kent County |
| New Castle County | 1 | New Castle County |
| Sussex County | 1 | Sussex County |
| Adams Crossroads | 1 | Sussex County |
| Adamsville | 1 | Kent County | 19950 |
| Addick Estates | 1 | New Castle County |
| Afton | 1 | New Castle County | 19810 |
| Airport Villa | 1 | New Castle County | 19720 |
| Alapocas | 1 | New Castle County | 19803 |
| Alban Park | 1 | New Castle County |
| Albertson | 1 | New Castle County |
| Albertson Park | 1 | New Castle County | 19808 |
| Albion | 1 | New Castle County |
| Analine Village | 1 | New Castle County | 19703 |
| Anderson Crossroads | 1 | Sussex County |
| Andrew's Lake | 1 | Kent County |
| Andrewsville | 1 | Kent County | 19950 |
| Anglesey | 1 | New Castle County | 19807 |
| Angola Beach | 1 | Sussex County | 19951 |
| Angola by the Bay | 1 | Sussex County |
| Anna Acres | 1 | Sussex County | 19971 |
| Anneville | 1 | Kent County |
| Arbour Park | 1 | New Castle County |
| Arden | 1 | New Castle County | 19810 |
| Ardencroft | 1 | New Castle County | 19810 |
| Ardentown | 1 | New Castle County | 19810 |
| Argo Corners | 1 | Sussex County | 19963 |
| Armstrong | 1 | New Castle County |
| Arundel | 1 | New Castle County | 19808 |
| Ashbourne Hills | 1 | New Castle County | 19703 |
| Ashland | 1 | New Castle County | 19807 |
| Ashley | 1 | New Castle County | 19804 |
| Atlanta | 1 | Sussex County | 19933 |
| Atlanta Estates | 1 | Sussex County | 19973 |
| Atlas Point | 1 | New Castle County |
| Augustine | 1 | New Castle County |
| Augustine Beach | 1 | New Castle County | 19731 |
| Avalon | 1 | New Castle County | 19808 |
| Bacon | 1 | Sussex County | 21875 |
| Bacons | 1 | Sussex County |
| Baldton | 1 | New Castle County | 19720 |
| Barkers Landing | 1 | Kent County | 19962 |
| Barkley | 1 | New Castle County |
| Bayard | 1 | Sussex County | 19945 |
| Bayview Manor | 1 | New Castle County |
| Bay View Park | 1 | Sussex County | 19930 |
| Bayville | 1 | Sussex County | 19975 |
| Bay Vista | 1 | Sussex County |
| Bear | 1 | New Castle County | 19701 |
| Beaver Brook | 1 | New Castle County | 19720 |
| Beaver Dam Heights | 1 | Sussex County | 19973 |
| Beaver Valley | 1 | New Castle County |
| Beech Haven | 1 | Kent County |
| Bellefonte | 1 | New Castle County | 19809 |
| Bellemoor | 1 | New Castle County | 19802 |
| Bellevue | 1 | New Castle County |
| Bellevue Manor | 1 | New Castle County | 19809 |
| Belltown | 1 | Sussex County | 19958 |
| Belmoor | 1 | New Castle County |
| Belvedere | 1 | New Castle County | 19804 |
| Belvidere | 1 | New Castle County | 19804 |
| Bennum | 1 | Sussex County |
| Berrytown | 1 | Kent County |
| Bestfield | 1 | New Castle County | 19804 |
| Bethany Beach | 1 | Sussex County | 19930 |
| Bethel | 1 | Kent County |
| Bethel | 1 | Sussex County | 19931 |
| Bethesda | 1 | Kent County |
| Bicentennial Village | 1 | Kent County |
| Big Oak Corners | 1 | Kent County |
| Big Pine | 1 | Kent County |
| Big Stone Beach | 1 | Kent County | 19963 |
| Binns Village | 1 | New Castle County | 19711 |
| Birchwood Park | 1 | New Castle County | 19711 |
| Bishops Corner | 1 | Kent County |
| Blackbird | 1 | New Castle County | 19734 |
| Blackiston | 1 | Kent County | 19938 |
| Blackwater | 1 | Sussex County |
| Blades | 1 | Sussex County | 19973 |
| Blanchard | 1 | Sussex County |
| Blue Ball | 1 | New Castle County |
| Bottom Hills | 1 | Sussex County |
| Bowers (Bowers Beach) | 1 | Kent County | 19946 |
| Boxwood | 1 | New Castle County | 19804 |
| Brackenville | 1 | New Castle County |
| Brack-Ex | 1 | New Castle County | 19805 |
| Branchview | 1 | Sussex County |
| Brandon | 1 | New Castle County |
| Brandywine | 1 | New Castle County | 19810 |
| Brandywine Hills | 1 | New Castle County |
| Brandywine Springs | 1 | New Castle County |
| Brandywood | 1 | New Castle County | 19810 |
| Breezewood | 1 | Kent County | 19711 |
| Brenford | 1 | Kent County | 19977 |
| Briar Park | 1 | Kent County | 19901 |
| Brick Store | 1 | New Castle County |
| Bridgeville | 1 | Sussex County | 19933 |
| Bridgeville Manor | 1 | Sussex County |
| Broad Acres | 1 | Sussex County | 19973 |
| Broad Creek | 1 | Sussex County | 19956 |
| Broadkill | 1 | Sussex County |
| Broadkill Beach | 1 | Sussex County | 19968 |
| Brookbend | 1 | New Castle County | 19711 |
| Brookdale Heights | 1 | Kent County | 19934 |
| Brookfield | 1 | Kent County |
| Brookhaven | 1 | New Castle County | 19711 |
| Brookland Terrace | 1 | New Castle County | 19805 |
| Brookside | 1 | New Castle County | 19713 |
| Brookside Park | 1 | New Castle County |
| Brookview Apartments | 1 | New Castle County | 19703 |
| Browns Corner | 1 | Kent County |
| Brownsville | 1 | Kent County | 19952 |
| Bryan Park | 1 | Sussex County |
| Buckingham Heights | 1 | New Castle County |
| Bullseye | 1 | Sussex County |
| Bunting | 1 | Sussex County | 19975 |
| Burwood | 1 | Kent County |
| Bush Manor | 1 | Kent County | 19901 |
| Buttonwood | 1 | New Castle County | 19720 |
| Camden | 1 | Kent County | 19934 |
| Camden-Wyoming, Delaware | 1 | Kent County | 19934 |
| Canby Park | 1 | New Castle County |
| Cannery | 1 | Kent County |
| Cannon | 1 | Sussex County | 19933 |
| Canterbury | 1 | Kent County | 19943 |
| Canterbury Hills | 1 | New Castle County |
| Capitol Green | 1 | Kent County | 19901 |
| Capitol Park | 1 | Kent County | 19901 |
| Caravel Farms | 1 | New Castle County |
| Cardiff | 1 | New Castle County | 19810 |
| Carlisle Village | 1 | Kent County | 19901 |
| Carpenter | 1 | New Castle County | 19803 |
| Carrcroft | 1 | New Castle County | 19803 |
| Carter | 1 | Kent County | 19901 |
| Carter Development | 1 | Kent County |
| Castle Hills | 1 | New Castle County | 19720 |
| Catalina Gardens | 1 | New Castle County | 19711 |
| Cedarbrook Acres | 1 | Kent County |
| Cedar Heights | 1 | New Castle County | 19804 |
| Cedars | 1 | New Castle County |
| Centennial Village | 1 | New Castle County |
| Center Green | 1 | New Castle County | 19703 |
| Centreville | 1 | New Castle County | 19807 |
| Chalfonte | 1 | New Castle County | 19810 |
| Chambersville | 1 | New Castle County |
| Channin | 1 | New Castle County | 19803 |
| Chapel Hill | 1 | New Castle County | 19711 |
| Chapeltown | 1 | Kent County |
| Chaplecroft | 1 | Kent County |
| Chatham | 1 | New Castle County | 19810 |
| Chelsea Estates | 1 | New Castle County | 19720 |
| Cherokee Woods | 1 | New Castle County | 19711 |
| Cherry Hill | 1 | New Castle County |
| Chestnut Grove | 1 | Kent County |
| Chestnut Hill Estates | 1 | New Castle County | 19711 |
| Chestnut Knoll | 1 | Sussex County | 19963 |
| Cheswold | 1 | Kent County | 19936 |
| Choate | 1 | New Castle County |
| Choptank Mills | 1 | Kent County |
| Christiana | 1 | New Castle County | 19702 |
| Christiana Acres | 1 | New Castle County | 19720 |
| Christine Manor | 1 | New Castle County | 19711 |
| Church Hill Village | 1 | Kent County |
| Clarksville | 1 | Sussex County | 19970 |
| Claymont | 1 | New Castle County | 19703 |
| Claymont Addition | 1 | New Castle County |
| Claymont Heights | 1 | New Castle County |
| Clayton | 2 | Kent County | 19938 |
| Clayton | 2 | New Castle County | 19938 |
| Clearfield | 1 | New Castle County | 19703 |
| Clearview Manor | 1 | New Castle County | 19720 |
| Cleland Heights | 1 | New Castle County | 19805 |
| Clifton Park Manor | 1 | New Castle County | 19802 |
| College Park | 1 | New Castle County | 19711 |
| Collins Beach | 1 | New Castle County |
| Collins Park | 1 | New Castle County | 19720 |
| Collins Pond Acres | 1 | Sussex County |
| Colmar Manor | 1 | Kent County |
| Colonial Heights | 1 | New Castle County | 19805 |
| Colonial Park | 1 | New Castle County | 19805 |
| Colony Hills | 1 | New Castle County |
| Columbia | 1 | Sussex County | 21875 |
| Concord | 1 | Sussex County | 19973 |
| Concord Hills | 1 | New Castle County |
| Concord Manor | 1 | New Castle County | 19803 |
| Cooch | 1 | New Castle County |
| Cool Spring | 1 | Sussex County | 19968 |
| Cool Spring Farms | 1 | Sussex County |
| Cooper Farm | 1 | New Castle County | 19808 |
| Corbit | 1 | New Castle County |
| Corner Ketch | 1 | New Castle County |
| Cottage Mill | 1 | New Castle County |
| Cottonpatch Hill | 1 | Sussex County | 19930 |
| Country Club Estates | 1 | Sussex County |
| Coventry | 1 | New Castle County | 19720 |
| Covered Bridge Farms | 1 | New Castle County | 19711 |
| Cowgills Corner | 1 | Kent County |
| Cragmere | 1 | New Castle County | 19809 |
| Cragmere Woods | 1 | New Castle County | 19809 |
| Craigs Mill | 1 | Sussex County | 19973 |
| Cranston Heights | 1 | New Castle County | 19808 |
| Cristine Manor | 1 | New Castle County |
| Crossgates | 1 | Kent County | 19901 |
| Cross Keys | 1 | Sussex County |
| Dagsboro | 1 | Sussex County | 19939 |
| Darley Woods | 1 | New Castle County | 19810 |
| Dartmouth Woods | 1 | New Castle County | 19810 |
| Deakyneville | 1 | New Castle County |
| Deerhurst | 1 | New Castle County | 19803 |
| Delaire | 1 | New Castle County |
| Delaney Corner | 1 | New Castle County |
| Delaplane Manor | 1 | New Castle County | 19711 |
| Delaware City | 1 | New Castle County | 19706 |
| Delaware Junction | 1 | New Castle County |
| Delaware River Pier | 1 | New Castle County |
| Delaware State Hospital | 1 | New Castle County |
| Del Haven Estates | 1 | Kent County | 19962 |
| Delmar | 1 | Sussex County | 19940 |
| Delpark Manor | 1 | New Castle County | 19808 |
| Del Shire | 1 | Kent County |
| Delshire-Hickory Dale | 1 | Kent County |
| Derby Shores | 1 | Kent County |
| Devon | 1 | New Castle County | 19810 |
| Devonshire | 1 | New Castle County | 19810 |
| Dewey Beach | 1 | Sussex County | 19971 |
| Dexter Corners | 1 | New Castle County |
| Dobbinsville | 1 | New Castle County | 19720 |
| Douglas Forge | 1 | Sussex County |
| Dover | 1 | Kent County | 19901 |
| Dover Air Force Base | 1 | Kent County | 19901 |
| Dover Base Hospital | 1 | Kent County |
| Dover Base Housing | 1 | Kent County |
| Doverbrook Gardens | 1 | Kent County | 19901 |
| Downs Chapel | 1 | Kent County | 19938 |
| Drawbridge | 1 | Sussex County |
| Drummond North | 1 | New Castle County | 19711 |
| Dublin Hill | 1 | Sussex County |
| Dunleith | 1 | New Castle County | 19801 |
| Dunlinden Acres | 1 | New Castle County | 19805 |
| Dupont | 1 | Kent County |
| Dupont Manor | 1 | Kent County | 19901 |
| Duross Heights | 1 | New Castle County | 19720 |
| Dutch Neck Crossroads | 1 | Kent County |
| Eastburn Acres | 1 | New Castle County |
| Eastburn Heights | 1 | New Castle County |
| East Lake | 1 | New Castle County |
| East Lake Gardens | 1 | Kent County |
| Eastman Heights | 1 | Sussex County |
| East Minquadale | 1 | New Castle County |
| Eastover Hills | 1 | Kent County | 19901 |
| East Side Village | 1 | Sussex County |
| Eberton | 1 | Kent County | 19901 |
| Eden Park | 1 | New Castle County | 19720 |
| Eden Park Gardens | 1 | New Castle County |
| Edenridge | 1 | New Castle County |
| Eden Roc | 1 | Kent County |
| Edgebrooke | 1 | New Castle County |
| Edge Hill | 1 | Kent County | 19901 |
| Edgehill Acres | 1 | Kent County | 19901 |
| Edge Moor | 1 | New Castle County |
| Edgemoor | 1 | New Castle County | 19809 |
| Edgemoor Gardens | 1 | New Castle County | 19802 |
| Edgewater Acres | 1 | Sussex County | 19975 |
| Edgewood Hills | 1 | New Castle County | 19802 |
| Edwardsville | 1 | Kent County | 19943 |
| Ellendale | 1 | Sussex County | 19941 |
| Elliott Heights | 1 | New Castle County | 19711 |
| Elmhurst | 1 | New Castle County | 19804 |
| Elsmere | 1 | New Castle County | 19805 |
| Elsmere Junction | 1 | New Castle County | 19805 |
| English Village | 1 | New Castle County | 19711 |
| Evergreen Acres | 1 | Sussex County | 19963 |
| Fairfield Crest | 1 | New Castle County | 19711 |
| Fairfield Farms | 1 | Kent County | 19901 |
| Fairmount | 1 | Sussex County | 19951 |
| Fairview | 1 | Kent County |
| Fairwinds | 1 | New Castle County | 19701 |
| Farmington | 1 | Kent County | 19942 |
| Farnhurst | 1 | New Castle County | 19720 |
| Faulkland | 1 | New Castle County | 19808 |
| Faulkland Heights | 1 | New Castle County | 19808 |
| Faulkwoods | 1 | New Castle County | 19810 |
| Federal | 1 | New Castle County | 19711 |
| Federalsburg | 1 | Sussex County |
| Felton | 1 | Kent County | 19943 |
| Felton Manor | 1 | Kent County | 19943 |
| Felton Station | 1 | Kent County |
| Fenwick Island | 1 | Sussex County | 19944 |
| Fern Hook | 1 | New Castle County |
| Fernwood | 1 | Sussex County |
| Fieldsboro | 1 | New Castle County | 19734 |
| Fireside Park | 1 | New Castle County | 19711 |
| Flea Hill | 1 | Sussex County |
| Fleming Corners | 1 | Kent County | 19952 |
| Flemings Landings | 1 | New Castle County | 19734 |
| Florence | 1 | Kent County |
| Fords Corner | 1 | Kent County |
| Forest | 1 | New Castle County |
| Forest Brook Glen | 1 | New Castle County | 19804 |
| Forest Hills Park | 1 | New Castle County | 19803 |
| Forest Park | 1 | New Castle County | 19805 |
| Fort Delaware | 1 | New Castle County |
| Fort Saulsbury | 1 | Sussex County |
| Foulk Woods | 1 | New Castle County |
| Four Seasons | 1 | New Castle County | 19711 |
| Fox Chase Park | 1 | New Castle County |
| Foxfield | 1 | New Castle County |
| Fox Hall | 1 | Kent County |
| Foxhall Courtside | 1 | Kent County |
| Frankford | 1 | Sussex County | 19945 |
| Frederica | 1 | Kent County | 19946 |
| Galewood | 1 | New Castle County | 19803 |
| Gams Crest | 1 | New Castle County |
| Garfield Park | 1 | New Castle County | 19720 |
| Garrisons Lake | 1 | Kent County |
| Garton Development | 1 | Kent County |
| Generals Greene | 1 | Kent County |
| George Read Village | 1 | New Castle County | 19711 |
| Georgetown | 1 | Sussex County | 19947 |
| Ginns Corner | 1 | New Castle County | 19734 |
| Glasgow | 1 | New Castle County | 19711 |
| Glasgow Pines | 1 | New Castle County |
| Glen Berne Estates | 1 | New Castle County | 19804 |
| Glendale | 1 | New Castle County | 19711 |
| Glenville | 1 | New Castle County | 19804 |
| Goose Point | 1 | New Castle County |
| Gordon Heights | 1 | New Castle County | 19802 |
| Gordy Estates | 1 | New Castle County | 19804 |
| Goslee Mill | 1 | Sussex County |
| Granogue | 1 | New Castle County | 19807 |
| Gravel Hill | 1 | Sussex County | 19947 |
| Graylyn Crest | 1 | New Castle County | 19810 |
| Green Acres | 1 | New Castle County | 19803 |
| Green Bank | 1 | New Castle County | 19808 |
| Greenbank | 1 | New Castle County |
| Green Briar | 1 | Kent County | 19720 |
| Greenbridge | 1 | New Castle County |
| Greenleaf Manor | 1 | New Castle County |
| Green Meadow | 1 | New Castle County |
| Green Spring | 1 | New Castle County |
| Greentop | 1 | Sussex County | 19960 |
| Greentree | 1 | New Castle County | 19703 |
| Greenview | 1 | Kent County | 19901 |
| Greenville | 1 | Kent County |
| Greenville | 1 | New Castle County | 19807 |
| Greenwood | 1 | Sussex County | 19950 |
| Grendon Farms | 1 | New Castle County |
| Greylag | 1 | New Castle County |
| Gumboro | 1 | Sussex County | 19945 |
| Gumwood | 1 | New Castle County | 19803 |
| Guyencourt | 1 | New Castle County | 19807 |
| Gwinhurst | 1 | New Castle County | 19809 |
| Hall Estates | 1 | Kent County | 19963 |
| Hamilton Park | 1 | New Castle County | 19720 |
| Hammville | 1 | Kent County |
| Hanbys Corner | 1 | New Castle County | 19810 |
| Harbeson | 1 | Sussex County | 19951 |
| Harmony | 1 | New Castle County |
| Harmony Hills | 1 | New Castle County | 19711 |
| Harrington | 1 | Kent County | 19952 |
| Hartly | 1 | Kent County | 19953 |
| Haven Lake Acres | 1 | Sussex County |
| Hayden Park | 1 | New Castle County | 19804 |
| Hazeldell | 1 | New Castle County |
| Hazlettville | 1 | Kent County | 19953 |
| Hearns Crossroads | 1 | Sussex County |
| Hearns Mill | 1 | Sussex County | 19973 |
| Heather Valley | 1 | New Castle County |
| Henlopen Acres | 1 | Sussex County | 19971 |
| Hercules | 1 | New Castle County | 19808 |
| Heritage | 1 | New Castle County |
| Heritage Village | 1 | Sussex County |
| Herring Landing | 1 | Sussex County |
| Hickman | 1 | Kent County | 21629 |
| Hickory Dale Acres | 1 | Kent County |
| Hickory Ridge | 1 | Kent County | 19977 |
| Hideaway Acres | 1 | Kent County |
| Highland Acres | 1 | Kent County | 19901 |
| Highland Acres | 1 | Sussex County | 19958 |
| Highland Woods | 1 | New Castle County |
| High Point | 1 | New Castle County |
| Hillcrest | 1 | New Castle County | 19802 |
| Hilldale | 1 | Kent County | 19901 |
| Hillendale | 1 | New Castle County |
| Hillside Heights | 1 | New Castle County | 19711 |
| Hilltop Manor | 1 | New Castle County | 19809 |
| Hoars Addition | 1 | Kent County |
| Hockessin | 1 | New Castle County | 19707 |
| Holiday Hills | 1 | New Castle County |
| Holiday Pines | 1 | Sussex County |
| Hollandsville | 1 | Kent County | 19943 |
| Holletts Corners | 1 | Kent County |
| Holloway Terrace | 1 | New Castle County | 19720 |
| Hollymount | 1 | Sussex County |
| Holly Oak | 1 | New Castle County | 19809 |
| Holly Oak | 1 | Sussex County | 19973 |
| Holly Oak Terrace | 1 | New Castle County | 19809 |
| Hollyville | 1 | Sussex County | 19951 |
| Hopkins Corners | 1 | Kent County |
| Hourglass | 1 | Kent County |
| Houston | 1 | Kent County | 19954 |
| Hudson Pond Acres | 1 | Sussex County |
| Hughes Crossroads | 1 | Kent County |
| Hunting Hills | 1 | New Castle County |
| Huntley | 1 | Kent County | 19901 |
| Hyde Park | 1 | New Castle County | 19808 |
| Idela | 1 | New Castle County | 19804 |
| Indian Beach | 1 | Sussex County | 19971 |
| Indian Field | 1 | New Castle County | 19810 |
| Indian Mission | 1 | Sussex County |
| Indian River | 1 | Sussex County |
| Indian River Acres | 1 | Sussex County | 19939 |
| Iron Hill | 1 | New Castle County |
| Ivy Ridge | 1 | New Castle County | 19720 |
| Jacobs Crossroads | 1 | Sussex County |
| Jefferson Crossroads | 1 | Sussex County |
| Jefferson Farms | 1 | New Castle County | 19720 |
| Jimtown | 1 | Sussex County | 19958 |
| Johnson | 1 | Sussex County |
| Johnson Corner | 1 | Sussex County | 19975 |
| Johnstown | 1 | Sussex County |
| Jones Crossroads | 1 | Sussex County |
| Keeney | 1 | New Castle County |
| Keen-Wik | 1 | Sussex County | 19975 |
| Kenilworth | 1 | New Castle County | 19703 |
| Kenmore Park | 1 | Sussex County | 19973 |
| Kent Acres | 1 | Kent County | 19901 |
| Kent Acres-south Dover Manor | 1 | Kent County | 19901 |
| Kentmere | 1 | New Castle County |
| Kenton | 1 | Kent County | 19955 |
| Keystone | 1 | New Castle County |
| Kiamensi | 1 | New Castle County | 19804 |
| Kiamensi Gardens | 1 | New Castle County |
| Killens Addition | 1 | Sussex County | 19971 |
| Kings Crossroads | 1 | Sussex County |
| Kirkwood | 1 | New Castle County | 19708 |
| Kirkwood Gardens | 1 | New Castle County |
| Kitts Hummock | 1 | Kent County | 19901 |
| Klair Estate | 1 | New Castle County | 19808 |
| Knowles Crossroads | 1 | Sussex County |
| Kynlyn Apartments | 1 | New Castle County | 19809 |
| Lake Shores | 1 | Sussex County |
| Lakeside Manor | 1 | Sussex County |
| Lakewood | 1 | Sussex County |
| Lamatan | 1 | New Castle County | 19711 |
| Lancashire | 1 | New Castle County | 19810 |
| Lancaster Village | 1 | New Castle County | 19805 |
| Landenberg Junction | 1 | New Castle County |
| Landers Park | 1 | New Castle County |
| Landlith | 1 | New Castle County |
| Latimer Estates | 1 | New Castle County |
| Laurel | 1 | Sussex County | 19956 |
| Laurel Bend | 1 | Kent County |
| Lauren Farms | 1 | New Castle County |
| Lawndale | 1 | Kent County |
| Layton Corners | 1 | Kent County |
| Lebanon | 1 | Kent County | 19901 |
| Leedon Estates | 1 | New Castle County | 19720 |
| Leipsic | 1 | Kent County | 19901 |
| Lewes | 1 | Sussex County | 19958 |
| Lewes Beach | 1 | Sussex County | 19958 |
| Lewes Naval Facility | 1 | Sussex County | 19958 |
| Lexington Mill | 1 | Kent County |
| Liberty | 1 | New Castle County |
| Liftwood | 1 | New Castle County | 19803 |
| Lightfoots Furnace | 1 | Sussex County |
| Limestone Acres | 1 | New Castle County | 19808 |
| Limestone Gap | 1 | New Castle County |
| Limestone Gardens | 1 | New Castle County | 19808 |
| Lincoln | 1 | Sussex County | 19960 |
| Lincoln City | 1 | Sussex County |
| Lindamere | 1 | New Castle County | 19809 |
| Linden Hill | 1 | New Castle County |
| Little Creek | 1 | Kent County | 19961 |
| Little Heaven | 1 | Kent County |
| Little Heaven-High Point | 1 | Kent County |
| Llangollen | 1 | New Castle County |
| Llangollen Estates | 1 | New Castle County | 19720 |
| Locustville | 1 | Kent County |
| London Village | 1 | Kent County |
| Long Neck | 1 | Sussex County | 19966 |
| Longview Farms | 1 | New Castle County | 19810 |
| Longwood | 1 | New Castle County |
| Lorewood Grove | 1 | New Castle County |
| Loveville | 1 | New Castle County |
| Lowe | 1 | Sussex County |
| Lowes Crossroads | 1 | Sussex County | 19966 |
| Lumbrook | 1 | New Castle County | 19711 |
| Lynch Heights | 1 | Kent County | 19963 |
| Lyndalia | 1 | New Castle County | 19804 |
| Lynnfield | 1 | New Castle County | 19803 |
| McClellandville | 1 | New Castle County | 19711 |
| McDaniel Heights | 1 | New Castle County | 19803 |
| McDonalds Crossroads | 1 | Sussex County |
| McDonough | 1 | New Castle County |
| McKnatt Corners | 1 | Kent County |
| Magnolia | 1 | Kent County | 19962 |
| Mahan | 1 | Kent County |
| Manette Heights | 1 | New Castle County |
| Manor | 1 | New Castle County | 19720 |
| Manor Park | 1 | New Castle County | 19720 |
| Manor Park Apartments | 1 | New Castle County | 19720 |
| Maplecrest | 1 | New Castle County | 19808 |
| Maplewood | 1 | New Castle County | 19711 |
| Marabou Meadows | 1 | New Castle County |
| Marker Estates | 1 | Kent County |
| Marshallton | 1 | New Castle County | 19808 |
| Marvels Crossroads | 1 | Kent County | 19952 |
| Marydel | 1 | Kent County | 19964 |
| Masonicville | 1 | New Castle County |
| Masten's Corner | 1 | Kent County | 19943 |
| Mayfair | 1 | Kent County | 19901 |
| Mayfield | 1 | New Castle County | 19803 |
| Mayview Manor | 1 | New Castle County | 19720 |
| Meadow Acres | 1 | Sussex County |
| Meadowbrook | 1 | New Castle County | 19804 |
| Meadowbrook Acres | 1 | Kent County |
| Meadowood | 1 | New Castle County | 19711 |
| Mechanicsville | 1 | New Castle County | 19711 |
| Meeting House Hill | 1 | New Castle County | 19711 |
| Melvin Crossroads | 1 | Kent County |
| Melvins | 1 | Kent County |
| Melvins Crossroads | 1 | Kent County |
| Mermaid | 1 | New Castle County |
| Middleboro Manor | 1 | New Castle County |
| Middleford | 1 | Sussex County | 19973 |
| Middlesex Beach | 1 | Sussex County | 19930 |
| Middletown | 1 | New Castle County | 19709 |
| Midvale | 1 | New Castle County | 19720 |
| Midway | 1 | Sussex County | 19971 |
| Midway Park | 1 | Sussex County |
| Milford | 2 | Kent County | 19963 |
| Milford | 2 | Sussex County | 19963 |
| Milford Crossroads | 1 | New Castle County | 19711 |
| Milford Meadows | 1 | New Castle County |
| Mill Creek | 1 | New Castle County |
| Millpond Acres | 1 | Sussex County | 19958 |
| Millsboro | 1 | Sussex County | 19966 |
| Millside | 1 | New Castle County |
| Milltown | 1 | New Castle County |
| Millville | 1 | Sussex County | 19967 |
| Milton | 1 | Sussex County | 19968 |
| Minners Corners | 1 | Kent County |
| Minquadale | 1 | New Castle County | 19720 |
| Mispillion Light | 1 | Sussex County | 19963 |
| Mission | 1 | Sussex County | 19966 |
| Monroe Park | 1 | New Castle County | 19807 |
| Montchanin | 1 | New Castle County | 19710 |
| Monterey Farms | 1 | New Castle County | 19720 |
| Moores Corner | 1 | Kent County |
| Morris Estates | 1 | Kent County | 19901 |
| Mount Cuba | 1 | New Castle County | 19807 |
| Mount Pleasant | 1 | New Castle County |
| Naaman | 1 | New Castle County |
| Naamans Gardens | 1 | New Castle County | 19810 |
| Naamans Trailer Park | 1 | New Castle County | 19703 |
| Nanticoke Acres | 1 | Sussex County | 19973 |
| Nanticoke Estates | 1 | Sussex County |
| Nanticoke Indian Association | 1 | Sussex County |
| Nassau | 1 | Sussex County | 19969 |
| Newark | 1 | New Castle County | 19702 | 17 |
| New Castle | 1 | New Castle County | 19720 |
| New Castle Manor | 1 | New Castle County | 19720 |
| Newkirk Estates | 1 | New Castle County | 19711 |
| New Market | 1 | Sussex County |
| Newport | 1 | New Castle County | 19804 |
| Newport Heights | 1 | New Castle County |
| Nonatum Mills | 1 | New Castle County |
| North Claymont | 1 | New Castle County |
| Northcrest | 1 | New Castle County | 19810 |
| North Hills | 1 | New Castle County | 19809 |
| North Ridge | 1 | New Castle County | 19703 |
| North Seaford Heights | 1 | Sussex County | 19973 |
| Northshire | 1 | New Castle County | 19810 |
| North Shores | 1 | Sussex County | 19973 |
| North Shores | 1 | Sussex County | 19971 |
| North Star | 1 | New Castle County | 19711 |
| Northwest Dover Heights | 1 | Kent County | 19901 |
| Northwood | 1 | New Castle County | 19803 |
| Nottingham Green | 1 | New Castle County | 19711 |
| Nottingham Manor | 1 | New Castle County |
| Oakdale | 1 | New Castle County |
| Oak Grove | 1 | Kent County | 19901 |
| Oak Grove | 1 | New Castle County | 19805 |
| Oak Grove | 1 | Sussex County | 19973 |
| Oak Hill | 1 | New Castle County | 19805 |
| Oakland | 1 | New Castle County |
| Oak Lane Manor | 1 | New Castle County | 19803 |
| Oakley | 1 | Sussex County |
| Oakmont | 1 | New Castle County | 19720 |
| Oak Orchard | 1 | Sussex County | 19966 |
| Ocean View | 1 | Sussex County | 19970 |
| Ocean Village | 1 | Sussex County |
| Odessa | 1 | New Castle County | 19730 |
| Odessa Heights | 1 | New Castle County |
| Ogletown | 1 | New Castle County | 19711 |
| Old Furnace | 1 | Sussex County |
| Old Mill Manor | 1 | New Castle County |
| Old Shawnee | 1 | Sussex County |
| Omar | 1 | Sussex County | 19945 |
| Overbrook | 1 | Sussex County |
| Overbrook Shores | 1 | Sussex County |
| Overlook | 1 | New Castle County | 19703 |
| Overlook Colony | 1 | New Castle County |
| Overview Gardens | 1 | New Castle County | 19720 |
| Owens | 1 | Sussex County |
| Owls Nest Estates | 1 | New Castle County | 19807 |
| Oyster Rocks | 1 | Sussex County |
| Paden Corner | 1 | Kent County |
| Palmer Park | 1 | Kent County |
| Palm Spring Manor | 1 | New Castle County | 19711 |
| Paris Villa | 1 | Kent County | 19962 |
| Parkside | 1 | New Castle County |
| Pearson Grove | 1 | Kent County |
| Pembrey | 1 | New Castle County | 19803 |
| Penarth | 1 | New Castle County | 19803 |
| Pencader | 1 | New Castle County |
| Pendrew Manor | 1 | New Castle County |
| Penn Acres | 1 | New Castle County | 19720 |
| Pennock | 1 | New Castle County |
| Pennrock | 1 | New Castle County | 19809 |
| Pennwood | 1 | Kent County |
| Pennyhill | 1 | New Castle County | 19809 |
| Pennyhill Terrace | 1 | New Castle County |
| Pennrock | 1 | New Castle County |
| Pepper | 1 | Sussex County |
| Pepperbox | 1 | Sussex County |
| Perry Park | 1 | New Castle County | 19810 |
| Perth | 1 | New Castle County | 19803 |
| Petersburg | 1 | Kent County | 19979 |
| Phillips Heights | 1 | New Castle County |
| Phillips Hill | 1 | Sussex County | 19966 |
| Pickering Beach | 1 | Kent County | 19901 |
| Piermont Woods | 1 | New Castle County |
| Pike Creek | 1 | New Castle County |
| Pilgrim Gardens | 1 | New Castle County |
| Pilottown | 1 | Sussex County | 19958 |
| Pinecrest | 1 | New Castle County |
| Pine Swamp Corner | 1 | New Castle County |
| Pinetown | 1 | Sussex County | 19958 |
| Pine Tree Corners | 1 | New Castle County | 19734 |
| Pinewood | 1 | Kent County |
| Pleasant Hill | 1 | New Castle County | 19804 |
| Pleasant Hills | 1 | New Castle County |
| Pleasanton Acres | 1 | Kent County | 19901 |
| Pleasantville | 1 | New Castle County | 19720 |
| Plymouth | 1 | Kent County | 19943 |
| Point Breeze | 1 | New Castle County | 19734 |
| Polly Drummond | 1 | New Castle County | 19711 |
| Polly Drummond Hill | 1 | New Castle County | 19711 |
| Porter | 1 | New Castle County | 19701 |
| Port Mahon | 1 | Kent County | 19901 |
| Port Penn | 1 | New Castle County | 19731 |
| Portsville | 1 | Sussex County | 19956 |
| Postles Corner | 1 | Kent County |
| Powelton | 1 | Kent County |
| Prices Corner | 1 | New Castle County |
| Primehook Beach | 1 | Sussex County | 19963 |
| Quaker Hill | 1 | New Castle County |
| Quakertown | 1 | Sussex County | 19958 |
| Quarryville | 1 | New Castle County |
| Radnor Green | 1 | New Castle County | 19703 |
| Radnor Woods | 1 | New Castle County | 19703 |
| Ralphs | 1 | Sussex County |
| Rambleton Acres | 1 | New Castle County | 19720 |
| Ramblewood | 1 | New Castle County | 19810 |
| Redden | 1 | Sussex County | 19947 |
| Redden Crossroads | 1 | Sussex County |
| Red Lion | 1 | New Castle County | 19701 |
| Reeves Crossing | 1 | Kent County | 19943 |
| Rehoboth Beach | 1 | Sussex County | 19971 |
| Rehoboth Manor | 1 | Sussex County | 19971 |
| Reliance | 1 | Sussex County | 19973 |
| Reybold | 1 | New Castle County |
| Reynolds Mill | 1 | Sussex County |
| Richard Heights | 1 | Sussex County |
| Richardson Circle | 1 | Kent County |
| Richardson Estates | 1 | Kent County |
| Richardson Park | 1 | New Castle County | 19804 |
| Ridgewood | 1 | New Castle County |
| Rising Sun | 1 | Kent County | 19934 |
| Rising Sun-Lebanon | 1 | Kent County |
| Riverdale | 1 | Sussex County | 19966 |
| Riverside | 1 | New Castle County |
| Riverside Gardens | 1 | New Castle County | 19703 |
| Riverview | 1 | Kent County |
| Riverview | 1 | Sussex County |
| Robbins | 1 | Sussex County |
| Robinsonville | 1 | Sussex County |
| Robscott Manor | 1 | New Castle County | 19713 |
| Rockland | 1 | New Castle County | 19732 |
| Rock Manor | 1 | New Castle County |
| Rodney Square | 1 | New Castle County | 19801 |
| Rodney Village | 1 | Kent County | 19901 |
| Rodric Village | 1 | Kent County | 19901 |
| Roesville | 1 | Kent County |
| Rogers Corners | 1 | New Castle County |
| Rogers Haven | 1 | Sussex County | 19967 |
| Rogers Manor | 1 | New Castle County | 19720 |
| Rolling Hills | 1 | New Castle County | 19804 |
| Rolling Park | 1 | New Castle County | 19703 |
| Rosedale Beach | 1 | Sussex County | 19966 |
| Rosegate | 1 | New Castle County | 19720 |
| Rose Hill | 1 | New Castle County | 19720 |
| Rose Hill Gardens | 1 | New Castle County | 19720 |
| Roselle | 1 | New Castle County | 19805 |
| Roselle Terrace | 1 | New Castle County |
| Roseville Park | 1 | New Castle County | 19711 |
| Ross | 1 | Sussex County |
| Rosscott Manor | 1 | New Castle County | 19713 |
| Roxana | 1 | Sussex County | 19945 |
| Royal Grant | 1 | Kent County |
| Ruthby | 1 | New Castle County |
| Rutherford | 1 | New Castle County | 19711 |
| Sabarto East | 1 | Kent County |
| Saint George | 1 | Sussex County |
| Saint Georges | 1 | New Castle County | 19733 |
| Saint Georges Heights | 1 | New Castle County |
| Saint Johnstown | 1 | Sussex County |
| Sand Hill | 1 | Sussex County |
| Sandtown | 1 | Kent County | 19943 |
| Sandy Brae | 1 | Sussex County |
| Sandy Fork | 1 | Sussex County |
| Sandy Landing | 1 | Sussex County |
| Schoolview | 1 | Kent County |
| Schultie Crossroads | 1 | Kent County |
| Scottfield | 1 | New Castle County | 19711 |
| Scrap Tavern Crossroads | 1 | Kent County |
| Seabreeze | 1 | Sussex County | 19971 |
| Seaford | 1 | Sussex County | 19973 |
| Seaford Heights | 1 | Sussex County | 19973 |
| Sedgley Farms | 1 | New Castle County | 19807 |
| Seeneytown | 1 | Kent County | 19938 |
| Selbyville | 1 | Sussex County | 19975 |
| Seven Hickories | 1 | Kent County |
| Shady Lane | 1 | Kent County | 19901 |
| Sharpley | 1 | New Castle County | 19803 |
| Shawnee | 1 | Sussex County |
| Shawnee Acres | 1 | Sussex County |
| Shawtown | 1 | New Castle County | 19720 |
| Sheffield Manor | 1 | New Castle County |
| Shellburne | 1 | New Castle County | 19803 |
| Sherwood | 1 | Kent County | 19901 |
| Sherwood Acres | 1 | Sussex County |
| Sherwood Forest | 1 | New Castle County |
| Sherwood Park | 1 | New Castle County | 19808 |
| Shipley Heights | 1 | New Castle County |
| Shockley Manor | 1 | Sussex County |
| Shortly | 1 | Sussex County | 19947 |
| Shorts Beach | 1 | Sussex County |
| Silver Brook | 1 | New Castle County | 19711 |
| Silver Lake Shores | 1 | Sussex County | 19971 |
| Silverside | 1 | New Castle County |
| Silverside Heights | 1 | New Castle County | 19809 |
| Silview | 1 | New Castle County | 19804 |
| Simonds Gardens | 1 | New Castle County | 19720 |
| Six Forks | 1 | Kent County |
| Skyline Crest | 1 | New Castle County |
| Slaughter | 1 | Kent County |
| Slaughter Beach | 1 | Sussex County | 19963 |
| Slaytonville | 1 | Sussex County | 19952 |
| Smith Crossroads | 1 | Kent County |
| Smith Hill | 1 | Sussex County |
| Smyrna | 2 | Kent County | 19977 |
| Smyrna | 2 | New Castle County | 19977 |
| Smyrna Landing | 1 | Kent County | 19977 |
| Snug Harbor | 1 | Sussex County | 19973 |
| Somers Center | 1 | Kent County |
| South Bethany | 1 | Sussex County | 19930 |
| South Bowers | 1 | Kent County | 19963 |
| South Dover Acres | 1 | Kent County | 19901 |
| South Wilmington | 1 | New Castle County |
| Springfield Crossroads | 1 | Sussex County |
| Spring Hill | 1 | Kent County |
| Spruance City | 1 | Kent County |
| Stanley Manor | 1 | Sussex County |
| Stanton | 1 | New Castle County | 19804 |
| Stanton Estates | 1 | New Castle County |
| Star Hill | 1 | Kent County | 19901 |
| Star Hill-Briar Park | 1 | Kent County |
| Star Hill Village | 1 | Kent County |
| Staytonville | 1 | Sussex County | 19952 |
| Stockdale | 1 | New Castle County | 19703 |
| Stockley | 1 | Sussex County |
| Stockly | 1 | Sussex County | 19947 |
| Stockton | 1 | New Castle County | 19720 |
| Stonehaven | 1 | New Castle County |
| Stratford | 1 | New Castle County | 19720 |
| Summit Bridge | 1 | New Castle County |
| Surrey Park | 1 | New Castle County | 19803 |
| Sussex Shores | 1 | Sussex County | 19930 |
| Swain Acres | 1 | Sussex County |
| Swann Keys | 1 | Sussex County | 19975 |
| Swanwyck | 1 | New Castle County | 19720 |
| Swanwyck Estates | 1 | New Castle County | 19720 |
| Swanwyck Gardens | 1 | New Castle County | 19720 |
| Sycamore | 1 | Sussex County | 19956 |
| Sycamore Gardens | 1 | New Castle County | 19711 |
| Talleys Corner | 1 | New Castle County |
| Talleyville | 1 | New Castle County | 19803 |
| Tanglewood | 1 | New Castle County | 19711 |
| Tarleton | 1 | New Castle County | 19803 |
| Tasker | 1 | New Castle County |
| Tavistock | 1 | New Castle County |
| Taylor Estates | 1 | Kent County | 19901 |
| Taylors Bridge | 1 | New Castle County | 19734 |
| Taylors Corner | 1 | New Castle County |
| Taylortown | 1 | New Castle County |
| Tent | 1 | New Castle County |
| The Beeches | 1 | Kent County | 19901 |
| The Blades | 1 | Kent County |
| The Cedars | 1 | New Castle County | 19808 |
| The Hamlet | 1 | Kent County |
| The Heath | 1 | Sussex County |
| The Highlands | 1 | New Castle County |
| The Island | 1 | Sussex County | 19973 |
| The Oaks | 1 | Sussex County |
| Thompsonville | 1 | Kent County | 19963 |
| Thorntown | 1 | New Castle County |
| Tidbury Manor | 1 | Kent County | 19901 |
| Todd Estates | 1 | New Castle County | 19711 |
| Tower Trailer Park | 1 | New Castle County | 19703 |
| Towne Point | 1 | Kent County | 19901 |
| Townsend | 1 | New Castle County | 19734 |
| Trepagnier | 1 | New Castle County |
| Truitts Park | 1 | Sussex County |
| Turnkey | 1 | Kent County |
| Tuxedo Park | 1 | New Castle County | 19804 |
| Twin Eagle Farms | 1 | Kent County |
| Twin Oaks | 1 | New Castle County |
| Tybrook | 1 | New Castle County | 19808 |
| Union Street | 1 | New Castle County | 19805 |
| Vagabond Trailer Park | 1 | New Castle County | 19703 |
| Valley Run | 1 | New Castle County | 19810 |
| Vandyke | 1 | New Castle County | 19734 |
| Van Dyke Village | 1 | New Castle County | 19720 |
| Varlano | 1 | New Castle County | 19702 |
| Vernon | 1 | Kent County | 19952 |
| Village of Drummond Hill | 1 | New Castle County | 19711 |
| Villa Monterey | 1 | New Castle County | 19809 |
| Viola | 1 | Kent County | 19979 |
| Voshell Cove | 1 | Kent County | 19901 |
| Voshell Mill | 1 | Kent County |
| Walker | 1 | New Castle County |
| Waples | 1 | Sussex County |
| Ward | 1 | Sussex County |
| Warwick | 1 | Sussex County |
| Washington Heights | 1 | Sussex County | 19971 |
| Washington Park | 1 | New Castle County | 19720 |
| Waterview Acres | 1 | Sussex County |
| Wawaset Park | 1 | New Castle County |
| Waynes Corner | 1 | New Castle County |
| Ways Corner | 1 | New Castle County |
| Webb Manor | 1 | Sussex County | 19963 |
| Wedgewood | 1 | Kent County |
| Wedgewood | 1 | New Castle County |
| Wedgewood Acres | 1 | New Castle County | 19720 |
| Weisman Acres | 1 | Sussex County | 19963 |
| Welshire | 1 | New Castle County | 19803 |
| Wescoats Corner | 1 | Sussex County |
| West Beach | 1 | Sussex County | 19939 |
| Westfield | 1 | New Castle County | 19804 |
| West Meadow | 1 | New Castle County | 19711 |
| West Minquadale | 1 | New Castle County |
| Westview | 1 | New Castle County | 19804 |
| Westwoods | 1 | Sussex County |
| Whaleys Corners | 1 | Sussex County |
| Whaleys Crossroads | 1 | Sussex County |
| Whigville | 1 | Kent County |
| White Hall | 1 | Kent County |
| Whitehall Crossroads | 1 | Kent County |
| Whiteleysburg | 1 | Kent County | 19943 |
| White Oak Farms | 1 | Kent County | 19901 |
| White River Estates | 1 | Sussex County |
| Whites Creek | 1 | Sussex County |
| Whitesville | 1 | Sussex County | 21875 |
| Wiggins Mill | 1 | New Castle County |
| Williamsville | 1 | Kent County | 19954 |
| Williamsville | 1 | Sussex County | 19975 |
| Willow Grove | 1 | Kent County | 19934 |
| Willow Run | 1 | New Castle County | 19805 |
| Wilmington | 1 | New Castle County | 19801 | 99 |
| Wilmington College | 1 | New Castle County | 19720 |
| Wilmington Manor | 1 | New Castle County | 19720 |
| Wilmington Manor Gardens | 1 | New Castle County | 19720 |
| Wilmont | 1 | New Castle County | 19810 |
| Wilsmere | 1 | New Castle County |
| Wilson | 1 | New Castle County |
| Windermer | 1 | New Castle County | 19804 |
| Windsor Hills | 1 | New Castle County |
| Windy Bush | 1 | New Castle County | 19810 |
| Windy Hills | 1 | New Castle County | 19711 |
| Winterset Farms | 1 | New Castle County | 19810 |
| Winterthur | 1 | New Castle County | 19735 |
| Wisseman Acres | 1 | Sussex County |
| Woodbine | 1 | New Castle County | 19803 |
| Wood Branch | 1 | Sussex County |
| Woodbrook | 1 | Kent County | 19901 |
| Woodbrook | 1 | New Castle County | 19803 |
| Woodcrest | 1 | Kent County | 19901 |
| Woodcrest | 1 | New Castle County | 19804 |
| Wooddale | 1 | New Castle County | 19807 |
| Woodenhawk | 1 | Sussex County | 19950 |
| Woodland | 1 | Sussex County | 19973 |
| Woodland Beach | 1 | Kent County | 19977 |
| Woodland Homes | 1 | New Castle County | 19804 |
| Woodshade | 1 | New Castle County | 19702 |
| Woods Haven | 1 | Kent County | 19963 |
| Woodside | 1 | Kent County | 19980 |
| Woodside East | 1 | Kent County |
| Woodside Hills | 1 | New Castle County | 19809 |
| Woodside Manor | 1 | New Castle County |
| Woods Manor | 1 | Kent County | 19901 |
| Woods Manor East | 1 | Kent County |
| Worthland | 1 | New Castle County | 19703 |
| Wrange Hill Estates | 1 | New Castle County |
| Wrangle Hill | 1 | New Castle County |
| Wrights Crossroads | 1 | Kent County |
| Wyoming | 1 | Kent County | 19934 |
| York Beach | 1 | Sussex County | 19930 |
| Yorklyn | 1 | New Castle County | 19736 |
| Zoar | 1 | Sussex County |
| Bridgeville-Greenwood | 1 | Sussex County |
| Central Kent | 1 | Kent County |
| Central Pencader | 1 | New Castle County |
| Greater Newark | 1 | New Castle County |
| Laurel-Delmar | 1 | Sussex County |
| Lower Christiana | 1 | New Castle County |
| Middletown-Odessa | 1 | New Castle County |
| Milford North | 1 | Kent County |
| Milford South | 1 | Sussex County |
| Piedmont | 1 | New Castle County |
| Pike Creek-Central Kirkwood | 1 | New Castle County |
| Selbyville-Frankford | 1 | Sussex County |
| Upper Christiana | 1 | New Castle County |

== See also ==
- List of cities in Delaware
- List of counties in Delaware
- List of hundreds of Delaware
