= Overbrook =

Overbrook is the name of several places:

== Places ==
=== United States ===
- Overbrook, Delaware, an unincorporated community
- Overbrook Shores, Delaware
- Overbrook, Georgia
- Overbrook, Kansas, a city
- Overbrook, New Jersey
- Overbrook Hospital for the Insane in Cedar Grove, New Jersey
- Overbrook, Oklahoma, an unincorporated community
- Overbrook, Philadelphia, a neighborhood of Philadelphia, Pennsylvania
  - Overbrook station
  - Overbrook School for the Blind in Overbrook, Philadelphia, Pennsylvania
- Overbrook (Pittsburgh), a neighborhood of Pittsburgh, Pennsylvania
- Overbrook (Greenville, South Carolina), a neighborhood of Greenville, South Dakota
- Overbrook (Nashville, Tennessee), NRHP building in Nashville, Tennessee

=== Canada ===
- Overbrook, Ottawa, a neighborhood of Ottawa, Ontario

== Other ==
- Overbrook Entertainment, American entertainment company
- Overbrook High School (disambiguation)
