= Delaire =

Delaire may refer to:

- Delaire, Delaware, an unincorporated community
- Bernard Delaire (1899-2007), French naval veteran of the First World War
- Jean Delaire (1923–2022), French orthodontist
- Ryan Delaire (born 1992), American football defensive end

== See also ==
- Del Aire, California, a census-designated place
- Laire, a commune in the Doubs department in the Bourgogne-Franche-Comté region in eastern France
