= Ward, Delaware =

Unincorporated community in Delaware, United States

- Unincorporated community
- Location within Delaware Location within the United States
- Coordinates: 38°29′07″N 75°28′40″W
- Country: United States
- State: Delaware
- County: Sussex
- Elevation: 49 ft (15 m)
- Time zone: UTC-5 (Eastern (EST))
  - Summer (DST): UTC-4 (EDT)
- Area code: 302
- GNIS feature ID: 216240

Ward is an unincorporated community in Sussex County, Delaware, United States. in the Little Creek Hundred. The Ward post office was established in 1886, and was discontinued in 1902. Ward was also the site of the Ward's Store, the Ward's School, and is the site of the Ward Family Cemetery.

== Geography ==
Ward is located on Delaware Route 30 northeast of Delmar. It lies adjacent to Wards Branch, a stream which is 3.3 mi (5.3 km) long. Ward is 2 mi (3.2 km) north of the Maryland-Delaware boundary, which is known as the Transpeninsular Line.

== History ==
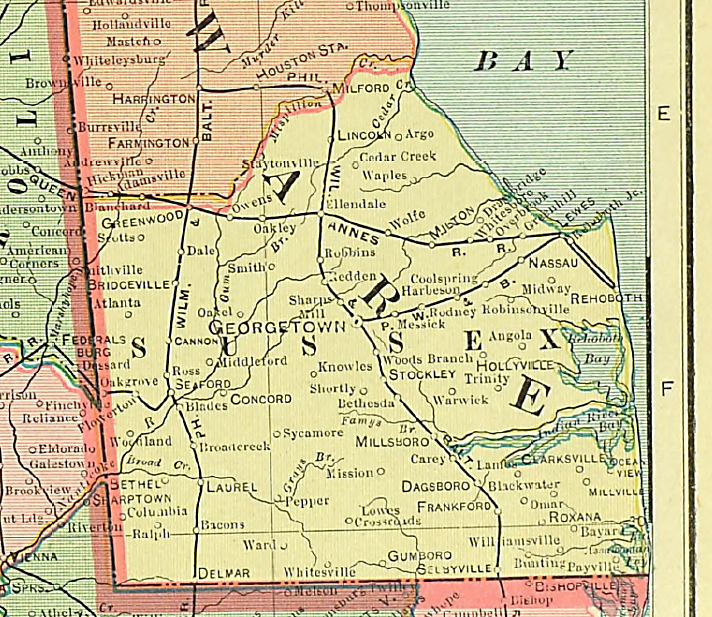
Ward in southernmost Sussex County, Delaware, in 1902

=== 1800s ===
A post office operated in Ward beginning in 1886. The community of Ward's population was just 25 residents in 1890; the number of residents had slightly increased to 35 residents in 1900.

=== 1900s ===
In the early 20th century, Ward was the location of Ward's School and Ward's Store. This store was the site of a number of Democratic Party public events.

The Ward post office closed in 1902.

In 1930, the state of Delaware announced a series of road upgrades to state highways. The road from Ward's School to Delmar was selected by the state that year for upgrade to a state highway.

In 1937, the Ward and Whitesville areas were the site of severe wildfires, with the Delaware State Forestry Commission stating, "The largest forest fires of the period occurred in the Whitesville — Ward's Store — Pepper Box section of Little Creek and Gumboro Hundreds in Sussex County". State officials stated that high winds during the fires caused widespread damage to that part of the state of Delaware.

Ward was still considered a village of Sussex County by the US Geological Survey in 1949.

The Ward Family Cemetery is located just north of Wards Corners on Gathering Garden Lane. The gravestones range in date from 1847 to 1923.

== See also ==
- Zoar, Delaware
