= Bellevue, Delaware =

Unincorporated community in Delaware, United States

- Unincorporated community
- Location within Delaware Location within the United States
- Coordinates: 39°46′15″N 75°29′01″W
- Country: United States
- State: Delaware
- County: New Castle
- Elevation: 16 ft (4.9 m)
- Time zone: UTC-5 (Eastern (EST))
  - Summer (DST): UTC-4 (EDT)
- Area code: 302
- GNIS feature ID: 216028

Bellevue is an unincorporated community in New Castle County, Delaware, United States. Bellevue is located along U.S. Route 13, on the west bank of the Delaware River between Edgemoor and Claymont.

== History ==
Bellvue was originally settled in the 19th century as Gregsville. It began as a quarry town. Bellevue's population was 500 in 1890, and was 488 in 1900.
