= Gwinhurst, Delaware =

Unincorporated community in Delaware, United States

- Unincorporated community
- Location within Delaware Location within the United States
- Coordinates: 39°47′30″N 75°28′44″W
- Country: United States
- State: Delaware
- County: New Castle
- Elevation: 98 ft (30 m)
- Time zone: UTC-5 (Eastern (EST))
  - Summer (DST): UTC-4 (EDT)
- Area code: 302
- GNIS feature ID: 216851

Gwinhurst is an unincorporated community in New Castle County, Delaware, United States in the Philadelphia metropolitan area.

== Location ==
Gwinhurst lies five miles northeast of Wilmington in the Brandywine Hundred and is located between Claymont and the incorporated town of Bellefonte. Perkins Run, Delaware River tributary, lies at its northern end; other borders are shared with Holly Oak and the similar neighborhoods Silverside Heights and Hillendale. Public services are mainly provided by New Castle County. Gwinhurst is within the Brandywine School District.

== History ==
Gwinhurst was first planned in 1919. Soon after, the first buildings at Gwinhurst were six bungalows built on speculation. Lot size at Gwinhurst was 20 by 100 feet, but deed restrictions set by the seller demanded houses have no less than 40 feet of frontage thus requiring buyers to purchase at least two lots to build. By 1940, homes in the expanded community were marketed as moderately priced and purchasable with Federal Housing Administration mortgage insurance loans.

As of 2012 there were 432 residential properties and a population of 1200 in the community.

== Education ==
It is in the Brandywine School District.

The Holly Oak area is zoned to Maple Lane Elementary School, P. S. DuPont Middle School, and Mount Pleasant High School.
