= Hillcrest, Delaware =

Unincorporated community in Delaware, United States

- Unincorporated community
- Location within Delaware Location within the United States
- Coordinates: 39°45′46″N 75°30′24″W
- Country: United States
- State: Delaware
- County: New Castle
- Elevation: 174 ft (53 m)
- Time zone: UTC-5 (Eastern (EST))
  - Summer (DST): UTC-4 (EDT)
- Area code: 302
- GNIS feature ID: 214097

Hillcrest is an unincorporated community in New Castle County, Delaware, United States. Hillcrest is located east of Marsh Road between Delaware Route 3 and U.S. Route 13 Business, north of Edgemoor. It was established in 1903.
