= Lincoln, Delaware =

Unincorporated community in Delaware, United States

- Census-designated place
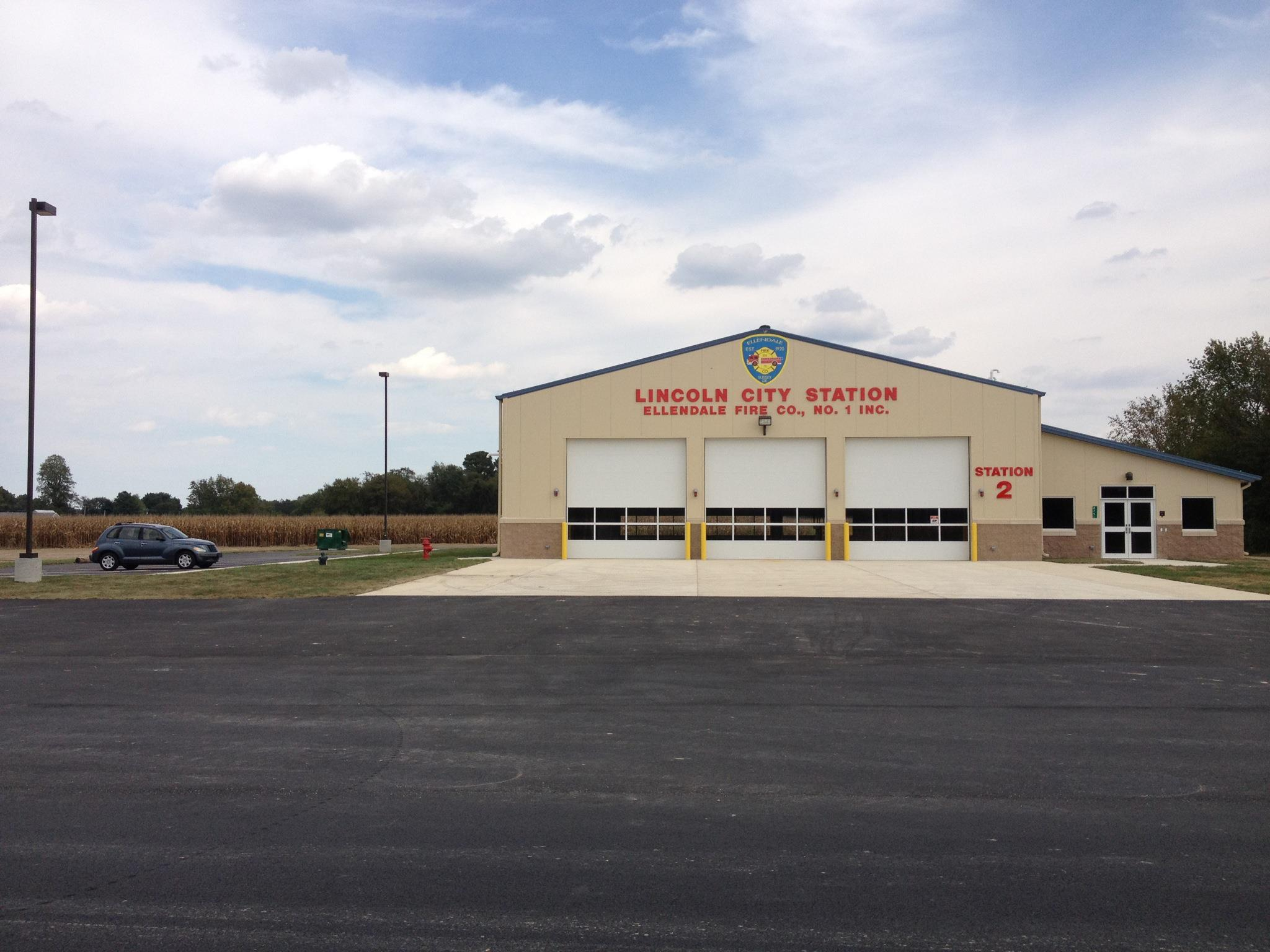
- Lincoln City Fire Station

- Location within the state of Delaware Lincoln (the United States)
- Coordinates: 38°52′11″N 75°25′23″W
- Country: United States
- State: Delaware
- County: Sussex

Area
  - Total: 2.84 sq mi (7.35 km^{2})
  - Land: 2.82 sq mi (7.30 km^{2})
  - Water: 0.019 sq mi (0.05 km^{2})
- Elevation: 43 ft (13 m)

Population (2020)
  - Total: 894
  - Density: 317.1/sq mi (122.44/km^{2})
- Time zone: UTC-5 (Eastern (EST))
  - Summer (DST): UTC-4 (EDT)
- ZIP code: 19960
- Area code: 302
- FIPS code: 10-42480
- GNIS feature ID: 214221

Lincoln (originally Lincoln City) is an unincorporated community in northern Sussex County, Delaware, United States. It is part of the Seaford, Delaware, Micropolitan Statistical Area. The planner who originally laid out the town planned for it to become the county seat. Lincoln lies on U.S. Route 113 between Ellendale and Milford. The town was never incorporated, but streets were laid out and several businesses and residences came, surrounding the current Delmarva Central Railroad line. Lincoln was formerly the headquarters of the Delaware Coast Line Railroad.

Recently there has been a push to incorporate Lincoln, primarily for two reasons. First, the city of Milford is quickly growing towards Lincoln and could eventually envelop the town. Secondly, the Delaware Department of Transportation is developing a Milford By-Pass for US 113 that could divide the small community of Lincoln, effectively cutting off neighbors from each other, as well as causing the removal of several homes and businesses and at least one of the two schools in Lincoln.

In the 2020 United States census, Lincoln was added as a census-designated place and had a population of 894.

== History ==
Lincoln City was established by Colonel Abel Stokes Small of New York in 1865 in anticipation of the arrival of the Delaware, Maryland and Virginia Railroad, planning the "future metropolis of southern Delaware." Early mention of the area include the Library of Congress which has record of a newspaper, The Lincoln Herald, published in the community beginning in October 1865 and the paper was later mentioned in The New York Times in the March 2, 1866 issue. The Evening Telegraph makes mention of a fundraising effort in Philadelphia, Pennsylvania to erect a church in Lincoln in the May 29, 1869 issue. By April 1888, the Delaware, Maryland and Virginia Railroad had updated their railroad station to "Lincoln City". Colonel Small established a lumber and planing mill in the community, but it was destroyed by fire on January 2, 1889. Days later, the death of Colonel Small on January 6, 1889, was announced. A horse racing race track was established in the community by 1891. A fire on Christmas morning 1897 destroyed a store, granary, and ice house, while damaging four more stores in Lincoln City.

== Education ==
Lincoln is in the Milford School District.

== Demographics ==
Historical population
Census	Pop.	Note	%±
2020	894		—
U.S. Decennial Census

== See also ==
- List of places in Delaware
