= Lindamere, Delaware =

Unincorporated community in Delaware, United States

- Unincorporated community
- Location within Delaware Location within the United States
- Coordinates: 39°45′40″N 75°29′34″W
- Country: United States
- State: Delaware
- County: New Castle
- Elevation: 89 ft (27 m)
- Time zone: UTC-5 (Eastern (EST))
  - Summer (DST): UTC-4 (EDT)
- Area code: 302
- GNIS feature ID: 216856

Lindamere is an unincorporated community in New Castle County, Delaware, United States. Lindamere is located along U.S. Route 13 on the west bank of the Delaware River, northeast of Edgemoor.
