= Lancashire, Delaware =

Unincorporated community in Delaware, United States

- Unincorporated community
- Location within Delaware Location within the United States
- Coordinates: 39°49′08″N 75°29′25″W
- Country: United States
- State: Delaware
- County: New Castle
- Elevation: 305 ft (93 m)
- Time zone: UTC-5 (Eastern (EST))
  - Summer (DST): UTC-4 (EDT)
- Area code: 302
- GNIS feature ID: 215826

Lancashire is an unincorporated community in New Castle County, Delaware, United States. Lancashire is located southeast of the intersection of Delaware routes 3 and 92, northeast of Wilmington.
