= Phillips Heights, Delaware =

Unincorporated community in Delaware, United States

- Unincorporated community
- Location within Delaware Location within the United States
- Coordinates: 39°46′00″N 75°30′29″W
- Country: United States
- State: Delaware
- County: New Castle
- Elevation: 207 ft (63 m)
- Time zone: UTC-5 (Eastern (EST))
  - Summer (DST): UTC-4 (EDT)
- Area code: 302
- GNIS feature ID: 217106

Phillips Heights is an unincorporated community in New Castle County, Delaware, United States. Phillips Heights is located east of the intersection of U.S. Route 13 Business and Marsh Road, northeast of Wilmington.
