= Pinetown, Delaware =

Unincorporated community in Delaware, United States

- Unincorporated community
- Location within Delaware Location within the United States
- Coordinates: 38°44′43″N 75°13′26″W
- Country: United States
- State: Delaware
- County: Sussex
- Elevation: 20 ft (6.1 m)
- Time zone: UTC-5 (Eastern (EST))
  - Summer (DST): UTC-4 (EDT)
- Area code: 302
- GNIS feature ID: 216182

Pinetown is an unincorporated community in Sussex County, Delaware, United States. Pinetown is located on Sweet Briar Road near Red Mill Pond, southwest of Lewes.

== History ==
Pinetown's population, c. 1965, was 75 residents.

A 1997 newspaper article noted that the predominantly African-American community was located in an isolated area. At the time, it had about 250 residents, but no businesses or bus services. The residents of Pinetown were stated to be generally all descended from a set of eight siblings. The majority of structures in the community were mobile homes. Children in the community went sent to schools in other towns for education.

Three years later, an article in the Wilmington News Journal estimated population to be about 150. In 2006, the Pinetown Civic Association completed a new community center. In 2015, a committee of the Delaware Housing Commission partnered with the Pinetown Civic Association to bring improvements and resources to Pinetown.

== Location ==
Pinetown is 7 miles (11 km) west of Lewes and 2 miles (3.2 km) east of Harbeson.
