= Woodside Hills, Delaware =

Unincorporated community in Delaware, United States

- Unincorporated community
- Location within Delaware Location within the United States
- Coordinates: 39°47′15″N 75°29′24″W
- Country: United States
- State: Delaware
- County: New Castle
- Elevation: 138 ft (42 m)
- Time zone: UTC-5 (Eastern (EST))
  - Summer (DST): UTC-4 (EDT)
- Area code: 302
- GNIS feature ID: 216833

Woodside Hills is an unincorporated community in New Castle County, Delaware, United States. Woodside Hills is located northwest of the intersection of Silverside Road and Carr Road to the northeast of Wilmington.
