= Brownsville, Delaware =

Unincorporated community in Delaware, United States

- Unincorporated community
- Location within Delaware Location within the United States
- Coordinates: 38°54′49″N 75°40′47″W
- Country: United States
- State: Delaware
- County: Kent
- Elevation: 59 ft (18 m)
- Time zone: UTC-5 (Eastern (EST))
  - Summer (DST): UTC-4 (EDT)
- Area code: 302
- GNIS feature ID: 216052

Brownsville is an unincorporated community in Kent County, Delaware, United States. Brownsville is located at the intersection of Brownsville Road and Drapers Corners Road, west of Harrington.

== History ==
Brownsville's population was 25 in 1890, and was 20 in 1900.
