= Hazlettville, Delaware =

Unincorporated community in Delaware, United States

- Unincorporated community
- Location within Delaware Location within the United States
- Coordinates: 39°06′59″N 75°38′32″W
- Country: United States
- State: Delaware
- County: Kent
- Elevation: 62 ft (19 m)
- Time zone: UTC-5 (Eastern (EST))
  - Summer (DST): UTC-4 (EDT)
- Area code: 302
- GNIS feature ID: 214069

Hazlettville is an unincorporated community in Kent County, Delaware, United States. Hazlettville is located at the intersection of Westville Road and Hazlettville Road, southwest of Dover and west of Wyoming.
