= Philip Hill =

Phil Hill or Philip Hill or Phillip Hill may refer to:

- Philip Carteret Hill (1821–1894), Premier of Nova Scotia
- Philip Ernest Hill (1873 - 1944), English businessman, who expanded the Beecham Group
- Phil Hill (1927–2008), American racing driver, Formula One champion in 1961
- Phillip E. Hill Sr. (born 1956), American ringleader of a mortgage fraud scheme in the State of Georgia
- Phillip Hill (born 1972), American pop punk bass guitar player
- Phil Hill (1963-2017), American bodybuilder
- Phil Hill (ice hockey) (born 1982), Welsh ice hockey player

== See also ==
- Phillips Hill, Delaware, an unincorporated community
- Hill (surname)
