= Wrights Crossroads, Delaware =

Unincorporated community in Delaware, United States

- Unincorporated community
- Location within Delaware Location within the United States
- Coordinates: 39°9′6″N 75°43′49″W
- Country: United States
- State: Delaware
- County: Kent
- Elevation: 10 ft (3.0 m)
- Time zone: UTC-5 (Eastern (EST))
  - Summer (DST): UTC-4 (EDT)
- Area code: 302
- GNIS feature ID: 216259

Wrights Crossroads is an unincorporated community in Kent County, Delaware, United States. Wrights Crossroads is located at the intersection of Delaware Route 11 and Butterpat Road/Hourglass Road, southwest of Hartly.
