= Pickering Beach =

Pickering Beach may refer to:

- Pickering Beach, Delaware, an unincorporated community in Kent County, Delaware, United States
- Pickering Beach, Ontario, a neighbourhood of Ajax in Ontario, Canada
