= Perth, Delaware =

Unincorporated community in Delaware, United States

- Unincorporated community
- Location within Delaware Location within the United States
- Coordinates: 39°48′13″N 75°31′26″W
- Country: United States
- State: Delaware
- County: New Castle
- Elevation: 361 ft (110 m)
- Time zone: UTC-5 (Eastern (EST))
  - Summer (DST): UTC-4 (EDT)
- Area code: 302
- GNIS feature ID: 215860

Perth is an unincorporated community in New Castle County, Delaware, United States. Perth is located northwest of Delaware Route 261 between Shipley and Silverside Roads, to the northeast of Wilmington.
