= Flea Hill, Delaware =

Unincorporated community in Delaware, United States

- Unincorporated community
- Location within Delaware Location within the United States
- Coordinates: 38°39′44″N 75°26′09″W
- Country: United States
- State: Delaware
- County: Sussex
- Elevation: 49 ft (15 m)
- Time zone: UTC-5 (Eastern (EST))
  - Summer (DST): UTC-4 (EDT)
- Area code: 302
- GNIS feature ID: 216094

Flea Hill is an unincorporated community in Sussex County, Delaware, United States. Flea Hill is located on U.S. Route 9, southwest of Georgetown.

Flea Hill has been noted for its unusual place name.
