= Warwick, Delaware =

Unincorporated community in Delaware, United States

- Unincorporated community
- Location within Delaware Location within the United States
- Coordinates: 38°36′11″N 75°13′50″W
- Country: United States
- State: Delaware
- County: Sussex
- Elevation: 20 ft (6.1 m)
- Time zone: UTC-5 (Eastern (EST))
  - Summer (DST): UTC-4 (EDT)
- Area code: 302
- GNIS feature ID: 216241

Warwick is an unincorporated community in Sussex County, Delaware, United States. Warwick is located on Delaware Route 24, east of Millsboro and north of the Indian River.
