= Penarth (disambiguation) =

Penarth is a town in the Vale of Glamorgan, Wales.

Penarth may also refer to:

- Penarth, Cardiganshire, a former hundred of Cardiganshire, Wales, UK
- Penarth, Delaware, an unincorporated community in New Castle County, Delaware, U.S.
- Penarth (Newtown and Llanllwchaiarn), a house in Powys, Wales
- Penarth Group, a Rhaetian age (Triassic) lithostratigraphic group
- Penarth RFC, a Welsh rugby union club
