= Pepperbox, Delaware =

Unincorporated community in Delaware, United States

- Unincorporated community
- Location within Delaware Location within the United States
- Coordinates: 38°29′55″N 75°26′23″W
- Country: United States
- State: Delaware
- County: Sussex
- Elevation: 49 ft (15 m)
- Time zone: UTC-5 (Eastern (EST))
  - Summer (DST): UTC-4 (EDT)
- Area code: 302
- GNIS feature ID: 216178

Pepperbox is an unincorporated community in Sussex County, Delaware, United States. Pepperbox is located on Sussex County Road 62, north of the Maryland border.
