= Bacons, Delaware =

Unincorporated community in Delaware, United States

- Unincorporated community
- Location within Delaware Location within the United States
- Coordinates: 38°30′30″N 75°34′11″W
- Country: United States
- State: Delaware
- County: Sussex
- Elevation: 33 ft (10 m)
- Time zone: UTC-5 (Eastern (EST))
  - Summer (DST): UTC-4 (EDT)
- Area code: 302
- GNIS feature ID: 216022

Bacons is an unincorporated community located four miles north of the Maryland state line in Sussex County, Delaware, United States. Also known as Bacon Switch, the site was once a thriving railroad switch point in the late 19th century. The site between Delmar and Laurel, Delaware had a number of small stores. It was named after the Bacon family, who started a farm there, before expanding into the sawmill and basket making business. Parents Thomas and Amelia Bacon, had five sons: Frank, Albert, Thomas, William and Harry. The son Thomas designed a collapsible egg carrier in 1884 that was granted a US Patent, number 299715 . The egg carrier was used to ship eggs to Philadelphia, where it would be collapsed and returned to the farmer. Thomas Bacon Jr. died in 1939.
