= Smyrna Landing, Delaware =

Unincorporated community in Delaware, United States

- Unincorporated community
- Location within Delaware Location within the United States
- Coordinates: 39°18′29″N 75°35′37″W
- Country: United States
- State: Delaware
- Counties: Kent, New Castle
- Elevation: 3 ft (0.91 m)
- Time zone: UTC-5 (Eastern (EST))
  - Summer (DST): UTC-4 (EDT)
- Area code: 302
- GNIS feature ID: 216221

Smyrna Landing is an unincorporated community in Kent and New Castle counties of Delaware, United States. Smyrna Landing is located along Smyrna Landing Road at the crossing of Duck Creek, east of Smyrna.
