= McDonough, Delaware =

Unincorporated community in Delaware, United States

- Unincorporated community
- Location within Delaware Location within the United States
- Coordinates: 39°29′29″N 75°38′59″W
- Country: United States
- State: Delaware
- County: New Castle
- Elevation: 66 ft (20 m)
- Time zone: UTC-5 (Eastern (EST))
  - Summer (DST): UTC-4 (EDT)
- Area code: 302
- GNIS feature ID: 216150

McDonough is a small unincorporated community in New Castle County, Delaware, United States. The community lies north of Odessa and just due south of St. Georges. It is named for Captain Thomas Macdonough.
