= Tropical Storm Karen (2013) =

Atlantic tropical cyclone and nor'easter in 2013

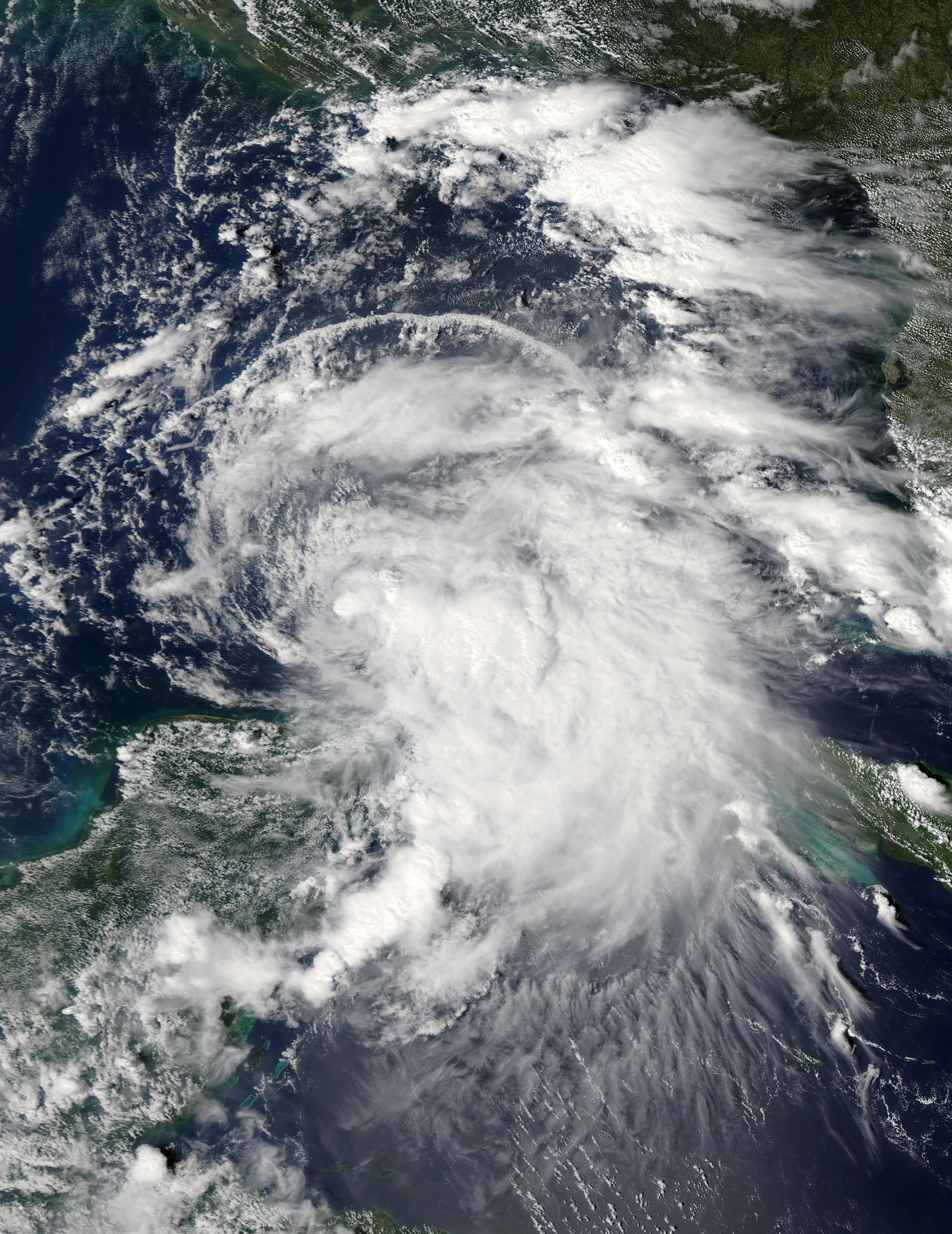
- Karen near peak intensity in the southern Gulf of Mexico on October 3

Meteorological history
- Formed: October 3, 2013
- Post-tropical: October 6, 2013
- Dissipated: October 15, 2013

Tropical storm
- 1-minute sustained (SSHWS/NWS)
- Highest winds: 65 mph (100 km/h)
- Lowest pressure: 998 mbar (hPa); 29.47 inHg

Overall effects
- Fatalities: None
- Damage: $18,000 (2013 USD)
- Areas affected: Yucatán Peninsula, Gulf Coast of the United States, Eastern United States
- IBTrACS
- Part of the 2013 Atlantic hurricane season and 2013–14 North American winter

Tropical Storm Karen was a system that brought record-breaking rainfall and flooding to southeastern Pennsylvania and other Mid-Atlantic states in October 2013. The twelfth tropical cyclone and eleventh named storm of the well below-average 2013 Atlantic hurricane season, Karen originated from a tropical wave that departed from the west coast of Africa on September 16. After passing south of Jamaica and the Cayman Islands, the storm became a tropical cyclone to the northeast of the Yucatán Peninsula. The storm peaked shortly afterward, with 1-minute sustained winds of 65 mph (105 km/h). The storm triggered warnings along the Gulf Coast of the United States, but the storm ultimately degenerated into an open trough in the Gulf of Mexico without making landfall. The remnants of Karen then turned eastward and crossed Florida, before evolving into a nor'easter off the coast of North Carolina, stalling off the Delmarva Peninsula through October 12. The system weakened and drifted back southwestward towards Florida, dissipating off the coast of the state on October 15.

The governors of Alabama, Florida, Louisiana, and Mississippi declared state of emergencies ahead of the storm. Mayors of several towns in Louisiana ordered mandatory evacuations. Oil workers on drilling platforms were evacuated ahead of the storm. The storm caused moderate coastal flooding along the Gulf Coast. The remnants of Karen transitioned into a nor’easter, bringing heaving rain from Florida to New Jersey. Karen's remnants dropped a maximum total of 11.27 inches (286 mm) of rain in Harrisburg, Pennsylvania. Overall damage was minimal, however, and no deaths were reported.

== Meteorological history ==
Map plotting the storm's track and intensity, according to the Saffir–Simpson scale Map key Saffir–Simpson scale Tropical depression (≤38 mph, ≤62 km/h) Tropical storm (39–73 mph, 63–118 km/h) Category 1 (74–95 mph, 119–153 km/h) Category 2 (96–110 mph, 154–177 km/h) Category 3 (111–129 mph, 178–208 km/h) Category 4 (130–156 mph, 209–251 km/h) Category 5 (≥157 mph, ≥252 km/h) Unknown Storm type Tropical cyclone Subtropical cyclone Extratropical cyclone, remnant low, tropical disturbance, or monsoon depression

On September 16, a tropical wave emerged into the Atlantic from the west coast of Africa. The wave propagated westward across the Tropical Atlantic Ocean, reaching the western Caribbean Sea on September 27. Around the same time, the National Hurricane Center (NHC) first mentioned the possibility of tropical cyclogenesis in the upcoming days. Around that time, the wave encountered an upper-level trough, generating deep convection over the region. On September 28, a broad area of low pressure formed southeast of Jamaica. The system travelled south of Jamaica and the Cayman Islands through the end of September, producing disorganized showers and thunderstorms. Early on October 1, the convection associated with the wave expanded and concentrated near the center. However, the system remained elongated due to moderate upper-level wind shear. Late on October 2, the disturbance began to quickly organize, though a Hurricane Hunter reconnaissance aircraft did not find a well-defined circulation. The aircraft did, however, indicate the low was producing gale-force winds. Another Hurricane Hunter aircraft investigated the storm early on October 3, finding a closed circulation as well as surface winds of 60 mph (97 km/h) and a pressure of 1004 mbar (29.65 inHg). Based on this information and surface observations, it is estimated that Tropical Storm Karen developed into a tropical cyclone near the northeastern tip of the Yucatán Peninsula at 06:00 UTC on October 3.

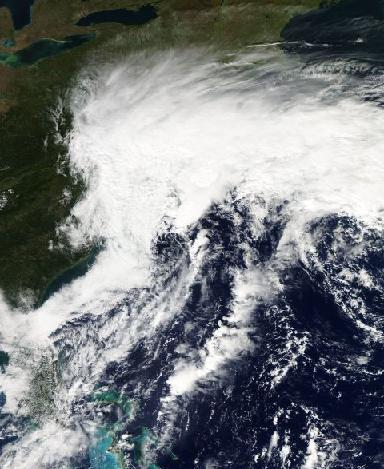
Tropical Storm Karen as a nor'easter on October 9, 2013

Despite being affected by more than 25 mph (40 km/h) of westerly wind shear, Karen continued to strengthen. The shear caused the bulk of Karen's convection to be displaced northeast of the low-level circulation center (LLCC). However, the NHC anticipated Karen to gradually strengthen into a hurricane, citing a marginally favorable environment with continuous moderate wind shear as an inhibiting factor. The cloud pattern of Karen remained sheared throughout October 3, with the LLCC partially exposed west of the convective mass. Late that day, a Hurricane Hunter aircraft found that Karen had deepened to a pressure of 999 mbar (29.5 inHg). At 21:00 UTC on October 3, Karen peaked with winds of 65 mph (105 km/h) and a central minimum pressure of 998 mbar (29.5 inHg). Early the next day, Karen began weakening as it succumbed to wind shear above 30 mph (48 km/h). The main area of convection was located around 115 miles (185 km) away from the center, and only sporadic bursts of thunderstorm activity occurred over the LLCC. Karen's center wobbled on October 4 as the coverage of convection over the center fluctuated. The cyclone consistently tracked west of the NHC track cone, due to it being ragged and weak, allowing low-level steering currents to direct it northwestward. Shear and dry air continued to plague the system throughout October 4. A NOAA reconnaissance jet found that wind shear west of the system was stronger than previously analyzed by weather models. The increased shear completely stripped the storm of its convection early on October 5, with NHC forecaster Lixion Avila remarking that the storm had been "decapitated." Karen moved northwestward at inconsistent forward speeds around a low- to mid-level ridge of high pressure. The storm gradually spun down, stalling off the coast of Louisiana late on October 5. At 00:00 UTC on October 6, Karen weakened into a tropical depression, as shear from an eastward-moving deep-layer trough finished off the storm. Twelve hours later, the system opened up into a trough off the coast of Louisiana. Karen was one of only a few tropical cyclones to lose tropical characteristics in the Gulf of Mexico without making landfall since the beginning of reconnaissance flights in 1943.

Subsequently, the remnants of Karen turned eastward and interacted with a cold front on October 7, transitioning into an extratropical cyclone soon afterward. The cyclone crossed Florida later that day, entering the Western Atlantic Ocean. The extratropical remnant then became elongated off the coast of The Carolinas and turned northeastward, becoming better-defined and consolidating into a nor'easter on October 9. For the next few days, Karen's remnant made a counterclockwise loop over the coast of North Carolina, reaching an extratropical peak of 1,005 millibars (29.7 inHg) on October 10, before making another counterclockwise loop off the coast of the Delmarva Peninsula. The nor'easter then turned southward on October 12, after completing its second loop. Afterward, the system drifted southwestward back towards Florida for the next few days, closing off a long, clockwise loop in its track. Karen's remnants eventually dissipated on October 15, just off the coast of Florida.

== Preparations and impact ==
=== Yucatán Peninsula ===
The Government of Mexico issued alerts for states on the Yucatán Peninsula. An experimental alert system was devised after the catastrophic impact of Hurricanes Ingrid and Manuel, being put to the test during Karen's passage. PEMEX, an oil drilling company owned by the government, was alerted to Karen's strong winds and high waves. In Quintana Roo, authorities ordered residents to remove trash from streets and to clear debris, in the event that the objects blocked sewers during a flood. Schools were also closed in the province. The Mexican Navy was ordered to patrol the waters near Holbox Island. In addition, citizens were encouraged by Comisión Nacional del Agua (Conagua), the Mexican National Weather Service, to exercise extreme precautions and to continue listening to civil protection calls. Sea vessels were advised by the agency to exercise caution in waters near the north and coast of the Yucatán Peninsula, due to the high swells. The tropical storm generated high waves and moderate to heavy rains in Yucatán and Quintana Roo, in addition to precipitation in Veracruz, Tabasco, and Campeche. Strong winds from Karen alleviated a red mite infestation in Tabasco and Campeche, carrying the parasite off crops.

=== U.S. Gulf Coast ===
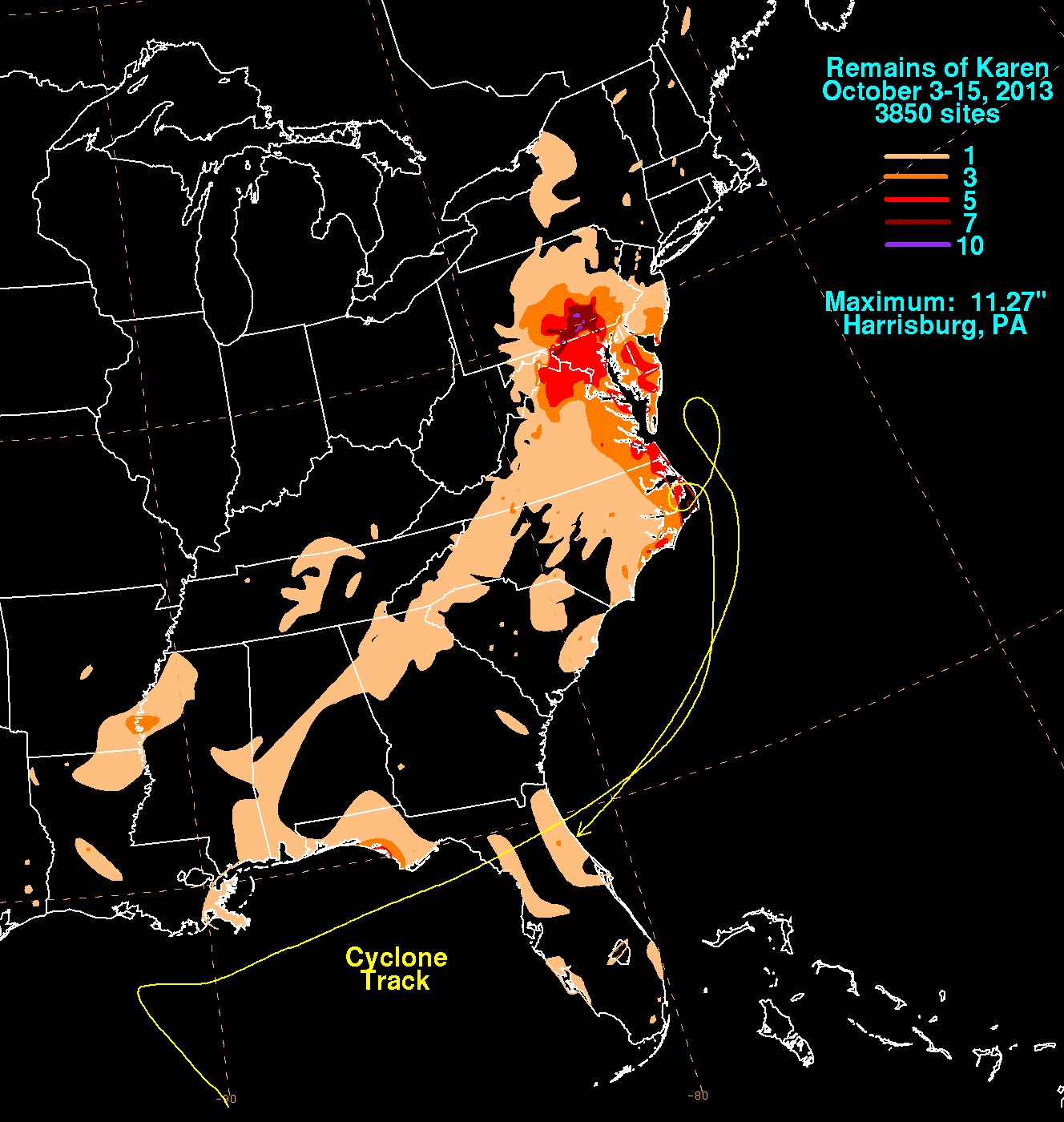
Total rainfall from Tropical Storm Karen and its remnants

While the storm was threatening the Gulf Coast of the United States, the NHC issued several tropical cyclone warnings and watches as Karen approached. Additionally, the governors of Alabama, Louisiana, Mississippi, and Florida declared states of emergency for their respective states. The mayor of Grand Isle, Louisiana evacuated the island on October 4, while residents were also ordered to flee the Lafourche and Plaquemines parishes. The Federal Emergency Management Agency (FEMA) and the United States Department of the Interior called back workers, furloughed because of an ongoing government shutdown, to assist state and local agencies. Louisiana Governor Bobby Jindal authorized the mobilization of the state's National Guard members to active duty.

Abnormally high tides were reported along the coast of Louisiana. At Grand Isle, tar balls from the Deepwater Horizon oil spill in 2010 were washed ashore. In Texas, the storm brought minor coastal flooding to Brazoria County. A road was flooded from wave runup in Surfside Beach. Bryan Beach was closed due to high waves. On October 2, a trough extending from Karen caused a strong thunderstorm with gale-force winds in Key West. Key West International Airport reported winds of 45 mph (72 km/h). The remnants of Karen and a cold front caused a strong thunderstorm in Marion County, Florida on October 7. Winds of 50 mph (80 km/h) damaged trees, power lines, and a barn roof, causing an estimated $5,000 in damage. In relation to the thunderstorm, a weather spotter reported that 1.57 in (40 mm) of rain had fallen in half an hour. A local radio station reported flooding in areas of Jacksonville Beach. On October 15, the extratropical remnants of Karen was situated offshore of northeast Florida, causing coastal flooding in parts of Jacksonville. Portions of roads were closed due to the tidal flooding of Hogans Creek.

=== Pennsylvania ===
As a nor'easter, Karen caused significant flooding in Pennsylvania, with some places nearly getting a foot (0.3 meters) of rain. Harrisburg saw more than 10 in (250 mm) of rainfall, setting the record for the wettest October for the city, with 11.27 in (286 mm) of rain recorded. Flood warnings were issued for Cumberland, Dauphin, Perry, Franklin, and Lebanon Counties. In Dauphin County, where Harrisburg is located, most areas received 5 to 10 inches (130 to 250 mm) of rain from the storm. Portions of the Pennsylvania Farm Show Complex & Expo Center parking lot were inundated. Parts of Hershey, including Hersheypark, experienced flooding. The animals at ZooAmerica in Hersheypark were evacuated to higher ground. The zoo took additional precautions due to the flooding and closed the park, after an incident two years prior, when Tropical Storm Lee flooded the area, killing two bison. Three people were displaced by flood waters on October 12 in Middletown. Numerous roads were closed in Adams County, mainly in the northern and eastern portions of the county. Two homes collapsed in Oxford and Tyrone townships. Numerous rural roadways were closed in Lancaster County, including Fruitville Pike near Pennsylvania Route 72. The Chickies Creek near Manheim, Pennsylvania overflowed its banks and flooded nearby roads. Minor river flooding also occurred in Lancaster from the Conestoga River. A precautionary evacuation took place at a mobile home trailer park in Hellam Township, due to river flooding associated with Kreutz Creek. A portion of U.S. Route 30 was flooded in West Manchester Township. In Camp Hill, moderate river flooding occurred on the Yellow Breeches Creek, with a crest of 11.4 feet (3.5 m). In Howe Township, a part of Perry County, a rockslide closed U.S. Route 322 westbound. One water rescue was performed for a stranded motorist in South Londonderry Township on Pennsylvania Route 241. Flooding was reported due to poor drainage systems in Downingtown, where 3.59 in (91 mm) of rain fell. Near Philadelphia, the Newtown Square Pennsylvania Railroad Museum rescheduled Newtown Square Railroad Day, originally set for October 12, to October 19. Philadelphia International Airport reported 2.03 in (52 mm) of rainfall from the nor'easter.

After the storm, the American Red Cross opened a shelter for people affected by flooding in Mechanicsburg. Workers cleared debris from a drain that caused the ramp from Hersheypark Drive to U.S. Route 322 westbound to flood. Residents of Germantown, a suburb of Philadelphia, were furious with the Philadelphia Water Department, due to sewers flooding from heavy rainfall. The residents claimed that the city had promised to fix the sewer problem since 2011, but no work had been done. A spokeswoman from the Water Department explained that the sewers were more than 100 years old and that "that sort of high intensity rain storm overwhelm our sewer system." The city directed residents to the Basement Protection Program, which would help alleviate some of the flooding problems.

=== New Jersey and Delaware ===
The nor'easter generated high wind gusts, heavy rain, and coastal flooding in New Jersey. In Ocean County, minor flooding associated with high tides was reported on Long Beach Boulevard in Beach Haven, along with Long Beach Island. Seaside Park and Lacey Township also experienced minor tidal flooding. At Harvey Cedars, wind gusts of at least 30 mph (48 km/h) were recorded for a record 79 consecutive hours, beginning at 3:00 a.m. EDT on October 9 and ending at 10:00 a.m. EDT on October 12. In Atlantic County, the Black Horse Pike was down to just one lane on October 8 because of coastal flooding. Some side streets in Atlantic City were flooded with water up to one foot (0.30 m) in height. In Stone Harbor, where the Army Corps of Engineers finished a major beach restoration project a few months prior to the storm, heavy wave action carved out cliffs along the beach. Some of the severest coastal flooding happened in Cape May County, where the National Weather Service issued a Coastal Flood Warning, citing property damage. Tidal flooding inundated roads in Strathmere. Several streets and parking lots off of New Jersey Route 47 were submerged by 2 to 3 feet (0.61 to 0.91 m) of floodwaters in Wildwood. In Ocean City, in Cape May County, a foot (0.3 m) of floodwaters entered garages along 10th Street. Cape May County also recorded the highest rainfall amounts in the state, with 3.74 in (95 mm) in Middle Township and 3.54 in (90 mm) in Cape May. Sea Isle City's Italian Festival and Columbus Day Parade on October 12 were postponed to October 26. Nearby, the West Cape May Christmas Parade Fundraiser and the Avalon Seafood Festival were postponed. The Lima Bean Festival was delayed until October 13. The Cape May Wine Festival was delayed one day to October 13. Total damage in New Jersey was minimal, estimated at $5,000 (2013 USD).

In neighboring Delaware, similar coastal flooding and strong wind gusts affected coastal parts of all three counties. The Delaware State University cancelled some outdoor activities scheduled for the October 11 and 12. In Sussex County, Long Neck, and the surrounding areas experienced tidal flooding. Roadway tidal flooding occurred in and around Angola and Oak Orchard. Strong waves pushed water over bulkheads. In Milton, minor tidal flooding closed Prime Hook Road for several days. The Delaware Department of Transportation helped residents living along the road reach or exit their homes. The high tides reached the support pilings of homes at Primehook Beach. Delaware Route 16 was also flooded, and the Delaware Department of Transportation recommended evacuation. In Kent County, minor tidal flooding affected Bowers Beach, where a dune breach occurred. A parking lot was also flooded. Scattered street flooding and street closings occurred along Delaware Bay, between Dover and Milford. Delaware State University cancelled some outdoor activities scheduled for October 11 and 12. In New Castle County, the strong winds caused wave action to lap over a sea wall in Bay View Beach, south of Port Penn. While minor tidal flooding occurred during the daytime high tide cycles from October 9 through 13, in Kent and Sussex Counties, the highest tides occurred during the daytime high tide cycle on October 10. The high tide at Lewes reached 6.77 feet (2.06 m) above mean lower low water levels. Minor tidal flooding started at 6.0 feet (1.8 m) above mean lower low water levels. This also coincided with the strongest winds affecting the area, as most of the peak wind gusts occurred during the first half of the day on October 10. Peak gusts were all located in Sussex County: 50 mph (80 km/h) at Dewey Beach, 49 mph (79 km/h) in Lewes, and 39 mph (63 km/h) in Indian River. The strong winds blew sand into the left lane of northbound Delaware Route 1, near the Indian River Inlet Bridge. The runoff from the heavy rain that fell caused minor flooding along the Red Clay Creek Basin on October 11. The creek at Stanton was above 15 ft (4.6 m) flood stage on that day. Poor drainage led to flooding in Newark and Middletown. A peak rainfall amount of 2.9 in (74 mm) was recorded in Blackbird, with 1.98 in (50 mm) recorded in Newark and 1.5 in (38 mm) recorded at the New Castle Airport.

== See also ==
- Other storms with the same name
- Tropical cyclones in 2013
- Hurricane Jeanne (1980) – Rare November hurricane that stalled and dissipated in the Gulf of Mexico without making landfall
- Hurricane Alberto (1982) – Similarly dissipated in the Gulf of Mexico without making landfall
- Hurricane Ida (2009) – Similarly weakened drastically in the Gulf of Mexico due to wind shear, before transitioning into a nor'easter
- Tropical Storm Nestor (2019) – Transitioned into an extratropical cyclone in the Gulf of Mexico before making landfall in Florida
- Tropical Storm Beta (2020) – Took a similar path and affected the same areas
- List of wettest tropical cyclones in the United States
