= Pennrock, Delaware =

Unincorporated community in Delaware, United States

- Unincorporated community
- Location within Delaware Location within the United States
- Coordinates: 39°47′30″N 75°29′14″W
- Country: United States
- State: Delaware
- County: New Castle
- Elevation: 157 ft (48 m)
- Time zone: UTC-5 (Eastern (EST))
  - Summer (DST): UTC-4 (EDT)
- Area code: 302
- GNIS feature ID: 216857

Penrnock is an unincorporated community in New Castle County, Delaware, United States. Pennrock is located northeast of Silverside Road and southeast of Interstate 95 to the northeast of Wilmington.
