= Brackenville, Delaware =

Unincorporated community in Delaware, United States

- Unincorporated community
- Location within Delaware Location within the United States
- Coordinates: 39°46′50″N 75°40′59″W
- Country: United States
- State: Delaware
- County: New Castle
- Elevation: 322 ft (98 m)
- Time zone: UTC-5 (Eastern (EST))
  - Summer (DST): UTC-4 (EDT)
- Area code: 302
- GNIS feature ID: 216803

Brackenville is an unincorporated community in New Castle County, Delaware, United States. Brackenville is located at the intersection of Brackenville Road and Old Wilmington Road, east of Hockessin.

In 1809, William Brackend bought land along the road running from Wilmington to Lancaster. With the opening of the Wilmington Turnpike (Lancaster Pike) in 1818, he opened a hotel named the "Peace and Plenty". The hotel stood on the northwest corner of Old Lancaster Pike and Brackenville Road; it was demolished before 1937.
