= Bayard, Delaware =

Unincorporated community in Delaware, United States

- Unincorporated community
- Location within Delaware Location within the United States
- Coordinates: 38°30′01″N 75°07′54″W
- Country: United States
- State: Delaware
- County: Sussex
- Elevation: 16 ft (4.9 m)
- Time zone: UTC-5 (Eastern (EST))
  - Summer (DST): UTC-4 (EDT)
- Area code: 302
- GNIS feature ID: 216025

Bayard is an unincorporated community in Sussex County, Delaware, United States. Bayard is southwest of Bethany Beach.

== History ==
Bayard's population was 50 in 1890, and was 52 in 1900.
