= Welshire, Delaware =

Unincorporated community in Delaware, United States

- Unincorporated community
- Location within Delaware Location within the United States
- Coordinates: 39°47′05″N 75°30′59″W
- Country: United States
- State: Delaware
- County: New Castle
- Elevation: 276 ft (84 m)
- Time zone: UTC-5 (Eastern (EST))
  - Summer (DST): UTC-4 (EDT)
- Area code: 302
- GNIS feature ID: 217099

Welshire is an unincorporated community in New Castle County, Delaware, United States. Welshire is located northeast of the intersection of Shipley Road and Baynard Boulevard to the northeast of Wilmington.
