= Blanchard, Delaware =

Unincorporated community in Delaware, United States

- Unincorporated community
- Location within Delaware Location within the United States
- Coordinates: 38°49′14″N 75°39′08″W
- Country: United States
- State: Delaware
- County: Sussex
- Elevation: 52 ft (16 m)
- Time zone: UTC-5 (Eastern (EST))
  - Summer (DST): UTC-4 (EDT)
- Area code: 302
- GNIS feature ID: 216042

Blanchard is an unincorporated community in Sussex County, Delaware, United States. Blanchard is located at the intersection of Blanchard Road and Farm Lane, northwest of Greenwood.
