= Cleland Heights, Delaware =

Unincorporated community in Delaware, United States

- Unincorporated community
- Location within Delaware Location within the United States
- Coordinates: 39°44′05″N 75°34′29″W
- Country: United States
- State: Delaware
- County: New Castle
- Elevation: 112 ft (34 m)
- Time zone: UTC-5 (Eastern (EST))
  - Summer (DST): UTC-4 (EDT)
- Area code: 302
- GNIS feature ID: 216939

Cleland Heights is an unincorporated community in New Castle County, Delaware, United States. It was established in 1952 and consists of about 450 houses.

== Location ==
Cleland Heights is located to the north of Delaware Route 4 just southwest of the Wilmington city limit. It borders Canby Park Estates and Latimer Estates.

== History ==
Though the current community was founded in the 1950s, Cleland Heights can trace its history to the 1870s. The land was originally named Cleland Estate, after Dawson W. Cleland, who owned the area in the 1860s and 1870s. It was made into a reservoir in 1874. The first community with the name "Cleland Heights" was established in c. 1920, after the Liberty Housing Company acquired the area, 47.25 acres, and renamed it "Cleland Heights" in 1918.

The current community was first built in 1952 with 47 brick houses priced at $11,000 each. Other homes built in the next few years ranged in price from $7,500 to $18,500. The community eventually consisted of over 450 homes.

In 1991, residents organized a "crime watch association", replacing the civic association, after several burglaries and other incidents occurred. Residents from the bordering Latimer Estates joined the group and The News Journal reported that the crime rate had dropped 90% within two years.
