= Liftwood, Delaware =

Unincorporated community in Delaware, United States

- Unincorporated community
- Location within Delaware Location within the United States
- Coordinates: 39°46′40″N 75°31′19″W
- Country: United States
- State: Delaware
- County: New Castle
- Elevation: 223 ft (68 m)
- Time zone: UTC-5 (Eastern (EST))
  - Summer (DST): UTC-4 (EDT)
- Area code: 302
- GNIS feature ID: 217115

Liftwood is an unincorporated community in New Castle County, Delaware, United States. Liftwood is located southwest of the intersection of Shipley Road and Weldin Road, northeast of Wilmington.
