= Silverside, Delaware =

Unincorporated community in Delaware, United States

- Unincorporated community
- Location within Delaware Location within the United States
- Coordinates: 39°47′35″N 75°29′25″W
- Country: United States
- State: Delaware
- County: New Castle
- Elevation: 200 ft (61 m)
- Time zone: UTC-5 (Eastern (EST))
  - Summer (DST): UTC-4 (EDT)
- Area code: 302
- GNIS feature ID: 216218

Silverside is an unincorporated community in New Castle County, Delaware, United States. Silverside is located where Silverside Road crosses under CSX Transportation's Philadelphia Subdivision and Interstate 95, northeast of Wilmington.
