= Big Stone Beach, Delaware =

Unincorporated community in Delaware, United States

- Unincorporated community
- Location within Delaware Location within the United States
- Coordinates: 39°00′05″N 75°19′39″W
- Country: United States
- State: Delaware
- County: Kent
- Elevation: 0 ft (0 m)
- Time zone: UTC-5 (Eastern (EST))
  - Summer (DST): UTC-4 (EDT)
- Area code: 302
- GNIS feature ID: 216676

Big Stone Beach is an unincorporated community in Kent County, Delaware, United States. Big Stone Beach is located along the Delaware Bay at the end of Big Stone Beach Road, northeast of Milford.
