= Quarryville, Delaware =

Unincorporated community in Delaware, United States

- Unincorporated community
- Location within Delaware Location within the United States
- Coordinates: 39°46′45″N 75°29′14″W
- Country: United States
- State: Delaware
- County: New Castle
- Elevation: 59 ft (18 m)
- Time zone: UTC-5 (Eastern (EST))
  - Summer (DST): UTC-4 (EDT)
- Area code: 302
- GNIS feature ID: 216861

Quarryville was an unincorporated community in New Castle County, Delaware, United States. Quarryville is located along U.S. Route 13 Business between Bellefonte and Claymont. Quarryville is near Bellevue Lake, which was the site of the Bellevue Quarry. It was a small cluster of homes.
