= Foulk Woods, Delaware =

Unincorporated community in Delaware, United States

- Unincorporated community
- Location within Delaware Location within the United States
- Coordinates: 39°48′45″N 75°31′14″W
- Country: United States
- State: Delaware
- County: New Castle
- Elevation: 367 ft (112 m)
- Time zone: UTC-5 (Eastern (EST))
  - Summer (DST): UTC-4 (EDT)
- Area code: 302
- GNIS feature ID: 217128

Foulk Woods is an unincorporated community in New Castle County, Delaware, United States.

== Location ==
Foulk Woods is located north of the intersection of Delaware Route 261 and Silverside Road, east of Talleyville and 4.8 miles north of Wilmington.

== History ==
In September 1955, W. Percival Johnson, a well known local contractor, announced his company would start the development of a new community called "Foulkwood" that would have "half-acre lots with large single family homes." It named for Faulk Road (which itself had been named for an early settler to the Brandywine Hundred) the main roadway in the community. The development opened one year and consisted of split-level and two-story houses with a Colonial-style architectural theme. The original houses were marketed for about $20,000. The neighborhood's civic association was founded in 1959.

A second entrance to the community, Longwood Road, was built in the 1960s. Around that time the final expansion the community was made, bringing the total number of homes to 172. Speed bumps were added in 1983, after resident concerns over child safety. Records show that many of the residents worked for DuPont.

From c. 1959 until at least 1967, the community had a baseball team that competed in the Concord Baseball League (CBL).
