= Granogue, Delaware =

Unincorporated community in Delaware, United States

- Unincorporated community
- Location within Delaware Location within the United States
- Coordinates: 39°49′54″N 75°35′11″W
- Country: United States
- State: Delaware
- County: New Castle
- Elevation: 236 ft (72 m)
- Time zone: UTC-5 (Eastern (EST))
  - Summer (DST): UTC-4 (EDT)
- Area code: 302
- GNIS feature ID: 216101

Granogue is an unincorporated community in New Castle County, Delaware, United States. Granogue is located along Smiths Bridge Road, west of the Brandywine Creek and south of the Pennsylvania border.
