= Meadowbrook, Delaware =

Unincorporated community in Delaware, United States

- Unincorporated community
- Location within Delaware Location within the United States
- Coordinates: 39°45′10″N 75°43′24″W
- Country: United States
- State: Delaware
- County: New Castle
- Elevation: 233 ft (71 m)
- Time zone: UTC-5 (Eastern (EST))
  - Summer (DST): UTC-4 (EDT)
- Area code: 302
- GNIS feature ID: 217179

Meadowbrook is an unincorporated community in New Castle County, Delaware, United States. Meadowbrook is located along North Star Road north of Delaware Route 72, north of Pike Creek Valley and south of North Star.
