= Naamans Gardens, Delaware =

Unincorporated community in Delaware, United States

- Unincorporated community
- Location within Delaware Location within the United States
- Coordinates: 39°49′30″N 75°30′59″W
- Country: United States
- State: Delaware
- County: New Castle
- Elevation: 400 ft (120 m)
- Time zone: UTC-5 (Eastern (EST))
  - Summer (DST): UTC-4 (EDT)
- Area code: 302
- GNIS feature ID: 217123

Naamans Gardens is an unincorporated community in New Castle County, Delaware, United States. Naamans Gardens is located south of Delaware Route 92 between Grubb Road and Delaware Route 261, northeast of Wilmington.
