= Collins Beach, Delaware =

Unincorporated community in Delaware, United States

- Unincorporated community
- Location within Delaware Location within the United States
- Coordinates: 39°23′7″N 75°31′19″W
- Country: United States
- State: Delaware
- County: New Castle
- Elevation: 3 ft (0.91 m)
- Time zone: UTC-5 (Eastern (EST))
  - Summer (DST): UTC-4 (EDT)
- Area code: 302
- GNIS feature ID: 216068

Collins Beach is an unincorporated community in New Castle County, Delaware, United States. Collins Beach is located along the Delaware Bay at the eastern end of Collins Beach Road, northeast of Smyrna.
