= Lynnfield, Delaware =

Unincorporated community in Delaware, United States

- Subdivision
- Location within Delaware Location within the United States
- Coordinates: 39°47′20″N 75°30′29″W
- Country: United States
- State: Delaware
- County: New Castle
- Elevation: 253 ft (77 m)
- Time zone: UTC-5 (Eastern (EST))
  - Summer (DST): UTC-4 (EDT)
- Area code: 302
- GNIS feature ID: 217118

Lynnfield is a suburban community in New Castle County, Delaware, United States. Lynnfield is located northwest of the intersection of Delaware Route 3 and Baynard Boulevard, northeast of Wilmington.

Lynnfield consists of 167 houses. Housing at the subdivision was constructed in 1952 by Franklin Builders and was the first community in the area whose homes were all air-conditioned. There was a single transit line that connected Lynnfield to Wilmington. The Lynnfield Civic Association was formed to deal with local issues, and it published the bimonthly bulletin "The Lynnfielder."

In 1970, approximately 300 cars had their tires deflated in Lynnfield in an apparent Halloween prank. During the 1970s, York Air Conditioning advertised the longevity of their products by pointing to the fact that the machines in Lynnfield were still working 20 years later.

Flooding along Shellpot Creek and its tributaries has been a concern to residents, as erosion is caused by upstream development. There was a mosquito control program funded by donations from residents. A drainage ditch that emptied into Stoney Run was identified as a safety issue for children. As a result, Steven and Anita Zetlin built a fence, which upset some members of the Civic Association because it conflicted with a deed restriction.

The community is served by the Brandywine School District.
