= Loveville, Delaware =

Unincorporated community in Delaware, United States

- Unincorporated community
- Location within Delaware Location within the United States
- Coordinates: 39°46′15″N 75°39′52″W
- Country: United States
- State: Delaware
- County: New Castle
- Elevation: 328 ft (100 m)
- Time zone: UTC-5 (Eastern (EST))
  - Summer (DST): UTC-4 (EDT)
- Area code: 302
- GNIS feature ID: 216804

Loveville was an unincorporated community in New Castle County, Delaware, United States.

Loveville, a village in the northern part of the Mill Creek Hundred, was the site of a post office, two hotels, shops, a sawmill, and a historically significant mill likely used on the Underground Railroad. Two Delaware historical figures, the Reverend Thomas Love and Thomas Worrell, lived in Loveville. The loss of the Loveville post office followed a decline in the community, and the site is no longer marked on many maps.

== Geography ==
Loveville was located at the intersection of Delaware Route 48 and Loveville Road, southeast of Hockessin and west of Wilmington.

== Etymology ==
Loveville took its name for the Reverend Thomas Love, who lived in the community.

== History ==
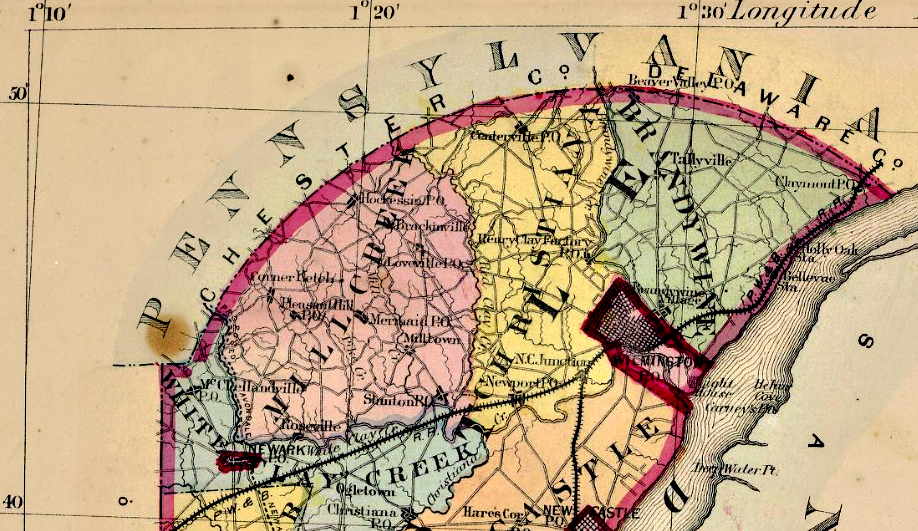
Loveville in northern New Castle County, Delaware, in 1868

=== Early years ===
In 1829, William Graves opened a store in Loveville. This store operated for sixteen years, according to state histories.

A post office opened in Loveville in 1831. Reverend Thomas Love served as an early postmaster of the Loveville post office; Love was also the minister of the Red Clay Creek Presbyterian Church one mile south of Loveville. He was later called "one of the most respected clergymen in the state."

Thomas Worrell, a Quaker, established a mill near Loveville in the 1840s. His home became a refuge for African-Americans fleeing slavery, and the Worrell Family Mill has been identified as a station on the Underground Railroad. Worrell stayed in the wool manufacturing business in Loveville for 30 years before selling the mill. Worrell openly promoted education for freed slaves at a time when his woolen mill was patronized primarily by pro-slavery advocates.

=== Heyday ===
By the 1840s, Loveville was noted as a village in New Castle County. A stagecoach line ran the six miles between Wilmington and Loveville, and from there to the Pennsylvania towns of New Garden, Avondale, Chatham, and Cochranville. The Loveville postmaster was Aaron Robinson in the 1850s.

In the 1870s, Loveville was described as a "small post village" with two hotels, a mill and sawmill, two shoemakers, two blacksmiths, a butcher, and two carpenters. The village also had a harness maker, a general merchant, a plasterer, and a wool factory, along with 57 farming families in the surrounding area. Further out from Loveville was the Mendenhall Mill.

=== Decline ===
The Loveville post office closed in 1872.

In 1880, Loveville's population was estimated at 50. By 1888, Loveville was described as a small hamlet with a few dwellings, and by 1908, Loveville was considered a "minor settlement".

Although still marked on some county maps, local media refer to Loveville as a "now-extinct village". Modern housing developments have grown up around the site.
