= Elmhurst, Delaware =

Unincorporated community in Delaware, United States

- Unincorporated community
- Location within Delaware Location within the United States
- Coordinates: 39°43′50″N 75°35′24″W
- Country: United States
- State: Delaware
- County: New Castle
- Elevation: 98 ft (30 m)
- Time zone: UTC-5 (Eastern (EST))
  - Summer (DST): UTC-4 (EDT)
- Area code: 302
- GNIS feature ID: 216936

Elmhurst is an unincorporated community in New Castle County, Delaware, United States. It was founded in the late 1910s and consists of about 500 houses.

== Location ==
Elmhurst is located northwest of Delaware Route 4 and west of Delaware Route 100 to the southwest of Wilmington and south of Elsmere. It is located at latitude 39°43'50" North, longitude 75°35'24" West. It was built on Newport Pike, opposite of another community called Ashley.

== History ==
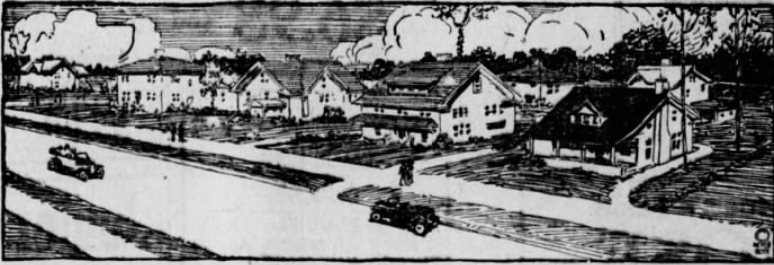
1920 drawing of Elmhurst in The Evening Journal.

The community of Elmhurst was started in the late 1910s, first being advertised for in April 1918. It opened to the public on May 11, and by May 17 The Morning News reported that "a great number of lots already sold." A major expansion to the community was in the 1930s, when most of the current houses were built. In 1939, the Journal–Every Evening called Elmhurst one of "Wilmington's most swiftly-growing, low-cost real estate developments." When completed the community consisted of around 500 homes.

Between the late 1930s and early 1940s, three semi-professional sports teams were based in Elmhurst. The Elmhurst Reds, of the New Castle County Baseball League (NCCBL), the Elmhurst Grays, of the Delaware Suburban Basketball League (SBL), and another team called the Elmhurst Reds, also playing in the Delaware Suburban Basketball League.
