= Naaman, Delaware =

Unincorporated community in Delaware, United States

Naaman, Delaware Naamans Corner
- Unincorporated community
- Location within Delaware Location within the United States
- Coordinates: 39°48′43″N 75°26′38″W
- Country: United States
- State: Delaware
- County: New Castle
- Elevation: 39 ft (12 m)
- Time zone: UTC-5 (Eastern (EST))
  - Summer (DST): UTC-4 (EDT)
- Area code: 302
- GNIS feature ID: 216164

Naaman (also known as Naamans Corner) is an unincorporated community in New Castle County, Delaware, United States. It is 0.5 mile south of the Pennsylvania state line and 7.5 miles northeast of Wilmington. Naaman is located at the intersection of Delaware Route 92 and Ridge Road, northeast of Claymont.

== Etymology ==
The name is believed to be derived from that of a Minqua chief who befriended the Swedish settlers of the area.

== See also ==
- Naamans Creek
- Claymont Stone School
