= Broad Creek, Delaware =

Unincorporated community in Delaware, United States

- Unincorporated community
- Location within Delaware Location within the United States
- Coordinates: 38°35′08″N 75°35′02″W
- Country: United States
- State: Delaware
- County: Sussex
- Elevation: 39 ft (12 m)
- Time zone: UTC-5 (Eastern (EST))
  - Summer (DST): UTC-4 (EDT)
- Area code: 302
- GNIS feature ID: 216050

Broad Creek is an unincorporated community in Sussex County, Delaware, United States. Broad Creek is 2 miles (3.2 km) north-northwest of Laurel. Broad Creek is named after the river of that name that drains the Bald Cypress swamps of both Trap Pond and Trussum Pond.

== History ==
Broad Creek's population was 54 in 1900.
