= Johnson, Delaware =

Unincorporated community in Delaware, United States

- Unincorporated community
- Location within Delaware Location within the United States
- Coordinates: 38°28′31″N 75°08′19″W
- Country: United States
- State: Delaware
- County: Sussex

Government
  - Councilman: Robert B. Arlett
- Elevation: 10 ft (3.0 m)
- Time zone: UTC-5 (Eastern (EST))
  - Summer (DST): UTC-4 (EDT)
- Postal code: 19945
- Area code: 302
- GNIS feature ID: 216128

Johnson is an unincorporated community in Sussex County, Delaware, United States. Johnson is located on Delaware Route 20, northwest of Fenwick Island.
