= Penarth, Delaware =

Unincorporated community in Delaware, United States

- Unincorporated community
- Location within Delaware Location within the United States
- Coordinates: 39°48′25″N 75°31′04″W
- Country: United States
- State: Delaware
- County: New Castle
- Elevation: 384 ft (117 m)
- Time zone: UTC-5 (Eastern (EST))
  - Summer (DST): UTC-4 (EDT)
- Area code: 302
- GNIS feature ID: 217122

Penarth is an unincorporated community in New Castle County, Delaware, United States, 4.6 miles (7.4 km) northeast of Wilmington in the Brandywine Hundred. Penarth is located west of the intersection of Delaware Route 261 and Silverside Road, east of Talleyville.
