= Berrytown, Delaware =

Unincorporated community in Delaware, United States

- Unincorporated community
- Location within the state of Delaware Berrytown, Delaware (the United States)
- Coordinates: 39°00′45″N 75°35′39″W
- Country: United States
- State: Delaware
- County: Kent
- Elevation: 59 ft (18 m)
- Time zone: UTC-5 (Eastern (EST))
  - Summer (DST): UTC-4 (EDT)
- GNIS feature ID: 216959

Berrytown is an unincorporated community located in Kent County, Delaware, United States. Its elevation is 59 feet (18 m) and is located at 39°00′45″N 75°35′39″W. Berrytown is located west of Felton, and is connected by Delaware Route 12 (Burnite Mill Road).
