= Pickering Beach, Delaware =

Unincorporated community in Delaware, United States

- Unincorporated community
- Location within Delaware Location within the United States
- Coordinates: 39°08′13″N 75°24′35″W
- Country: United States
- State: Delaware
- County: Kent
- Elevation: 7 ft (2.1 m)
- Time zone: UTC-5 (Eastern (EST))
  - Summer (DST): UTC-4 (EDT)
- Area code: 302
- GNIS feature ID: 214448

Pickering Beach is an unincorporated community in Kent County, Delaware, United States. Pickering Beach is located along the Delaware Bay at the end of Pickering Beach Road, southeast of Dover. The beach itself is an established horseshoe crab sanctuary, with the crabs spawning there in early summer.

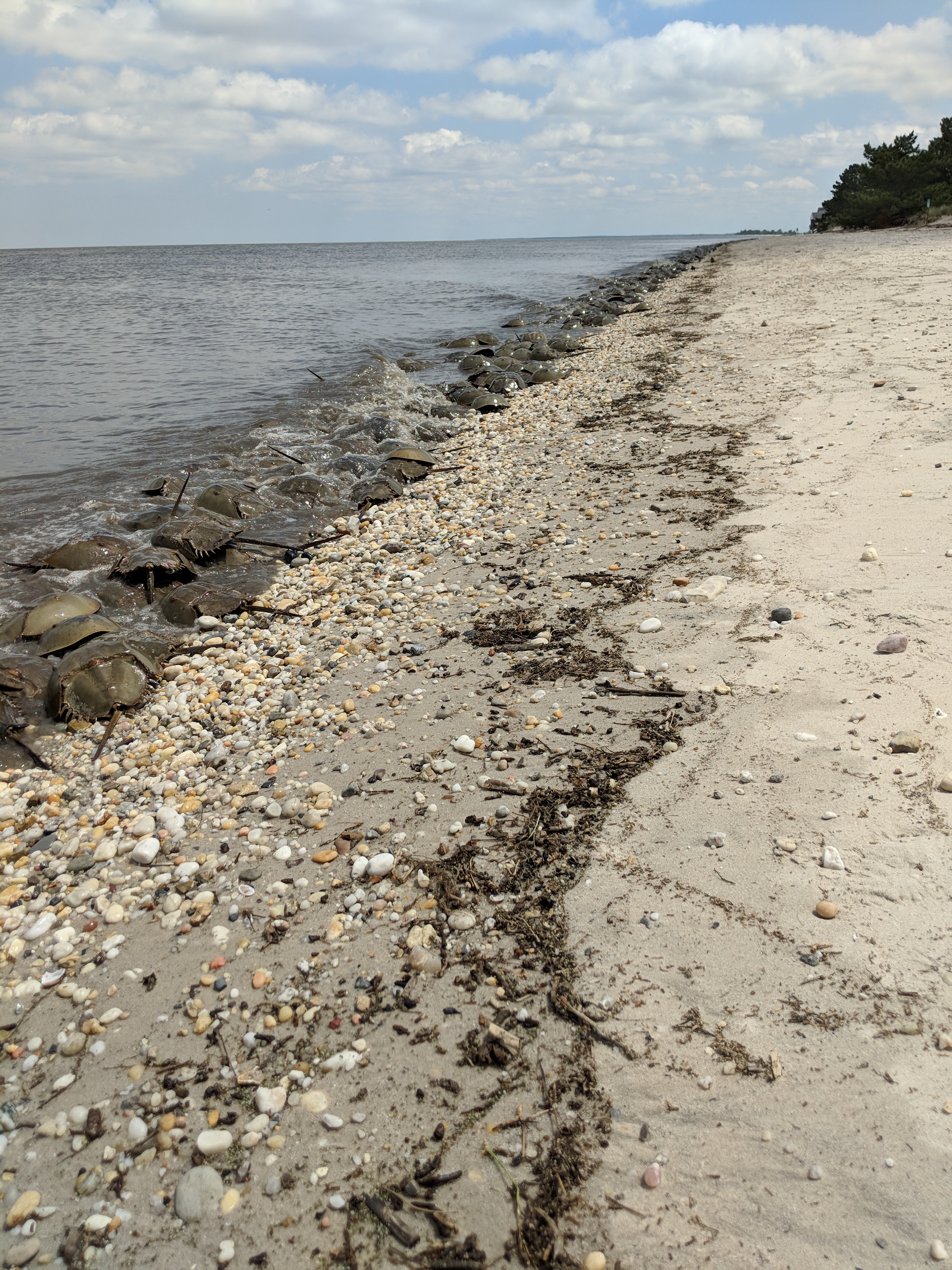
A large number of horseshoe crabs gather on the shore line in Pickering Beach, Delaware.
