= Holly Oak, Delaware =

Unincorporated community in Delaware, United States

- Unincorporated town
- Location within Delaware Location within the United States
- Coordinates: 39°47′18″N 75°28′44″W
- Country: United States
- State: Delaware
- County: New Castle
- Elevation: 79 ft (24 m)
- Time zone: UTC-5 (Eastern (EST))
  - Summer (DST): UTC-4 (EDT)
- Area code: 302
- GNIS feature ID: 214109

Holly Oak is an unincorporated town in New Castle County, Delaware, United States. Holly Oak is located northwest of U.S. Route 13 Business between Silverside Road and Harvey Road to the northeast of Wilmington and southwest of Claymont. It was once served by the Philadelphia, Wilmington and Baltimore Railroad. Perkins Run, a Delaware River tributary, mouths at Holly Oak.

== Education ==
It is in the Brandywine School District.

The Holly Oak area is zoned to Maple Lane Elementary School, P. S. DuPont Middle School, and Mount Pleasant High School.

== See also ==
- Holly Oak gorget
