= Overbrook, Delaware =

Unincorporated community in Delaware, United States

- Unincorporated community
- Location within Delaware Location within the United States
- Coordinates: 38°46′03″N 75°12′54″W
- Country: United States
- State: Delaware
- County: Sussex
- Elevation: 23 ft (7.0 m)
- Time zone: UTC-5 (Eastern (EST))
  - Summer (DST): UTC-4 (EDT)
- Area code: 302
- GNIS feature ID: 216171

Overbrook is an unincorporated community and former village in Sussex County, Delaware, United States.

== Geography ==
Overbrook radiates from the intersection of Delaware Route 1 and Cave Neck Road between Lewes and Milton. in the Broadkill Hundred.

== History ==
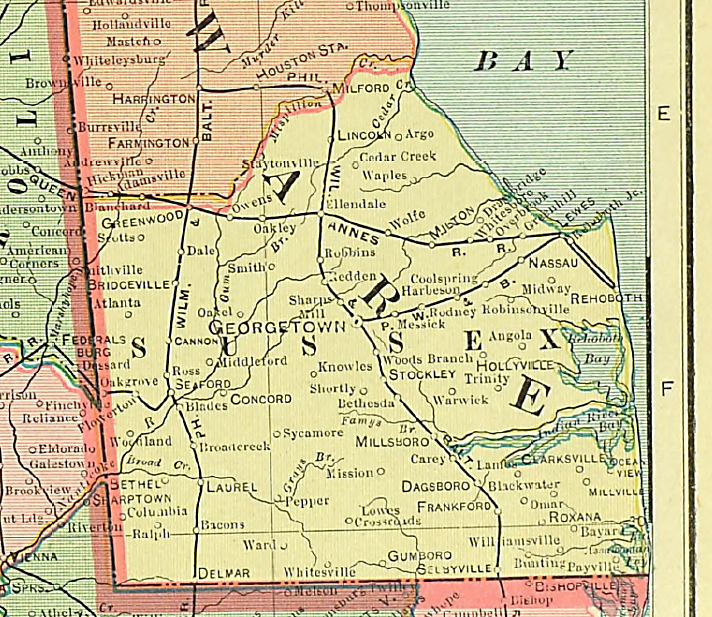
Overbrook in Sussex County, Delaware, in 1902

=== Nineteenth century ===
Burton's Chapel A.M.E Church was built on the "road to the oyster rocks of the Broadkill River" in 1870.

Overbrook was a post village on the Queen Anne's Railroad, which was said to be famous for its excursions in the 1890s. Overbrook's post office opened September 10, 1899, with George L. Short serving as Overbrook's first (and only) postmaster.

In April 1899, a train near Overbrook collided with a small herd of cattle, killing the animals.

Overbrook's population was 25 in 1900.

=== Twentieth century ===
Overbrook was the site of a branch of the fraternal order of Junior Mechanics, an anti-Catholic organization. The Overbrook order was founded on April 9, 1901, and at it founding, the group had 29 members.

Overbrook's post office closed on September 15, 1914, but the rail station continued to operate for another decade. The Queen Anne's Rail line was discontinued and the station closed in 1924.

In 1921, Overbrook was the site of a selenosis epidemic in area cattle. The outbreak, at that time called "Blind Staggers", was noted in state newspapers. That same year, the Wilmington Journal noted the fire at the A.L. Hill general store in Overbrook.

In the 1930s, Overbrook was noted for its ardent fox-hunters. These fox hunters were reportedly on foot or in vehicles, and in that era, the Overbrook fox hunts were particularly loud and long.

=== Twenty-first century ===
In 2016, Sussex County officials rejected a plan to rezone 114 acres of rural farmland in the Overbrook area; the development would have been called Overbrook Town Center. This decision was upheld by officials in 2021, after a public vote in 2018.
