= Delaire, Delaware =

Unincorporated community in Delaware, United States

- Unincorporated community
- Location within Delaware Location within the United States
- Coordinates: 39°46′41″N 75°29′04″W
- Country: United States
- State: Delaware
- County: New Castle
- Elevation: 82 ft (25 m)
- Time zone: UTC-5 (Eastern (EST))
  - Summer (DST): UTC-4 (EDT)
- Area code: 302
- GNIS feature ID: 216838

Delaire is a suburban community in New Castle County, Delaware, United States.

Delaire is located on a hilltop overlooking the Delaware River northeast of Bellefonte between U.S. Route 13 Business (Philadelphia Pike) and U.S. Route 13. It abuts Bellevue State Park and Stoney Creek.

Delaire was developed in the 1940s from the subdivision of 61 acres (25 ha) of the Volpe Tract, former site of the Bellevue Gun Club. In 1980 it was described as being typical of the Brandywine Hundred: "solid, all masonry, all middle-class, mostly white-collar, and mostly Republican".
