= Whitesville, Delaware =

Unincorporated community in Delaware, United States

- Unincorporated community
- Location within Delaware Location within the United States
- Coordinates: 38°27′31″N 75°25′37″W
- Country: United States
- State: Delaware
- County: Sussex
- Elevation: 56 ft (17 m)
- Time zone: UTC-5 (Eastern (EST))
  - Summer (DST): UTC-4 (EDT)
- Area code: 302
- GNIS feature ID: 214846

Whitesville is an unincorporated community in Sussex County, Delaware, United States. Whitesville is located just north of the stateline with Maryland. between Delmar and Selbyville. Local folklore ascribes the name to Ezekiel Williams, who built the first house in the village. It is the site of the Line United Methodist Church.

== See also ==
- Transpeninsular Line
