= Primehook Beach, Delaware =

Unincorporated community in Delaware, United States

Primehook Beach, Delaware Shorts Beach
- Unincorporated community
- Location within Delaware Location within the United States
- Coordinates: 38°51′20″N 75°14′34″W
- Country: United States
- State: Delaware
- County: Sussex
- Elevation: 7 ft (2.1 m)
- Time zone: UTC-5 (Eastern (EST))
  - Summer (DST): UTC-4 (EDT)
- Area code: 302
- GNIS feature ID: 214495

Primehook Beach (also known as Shorts Beach) is an unincorporated community in Sussex County, Delaware, United States. Primehook Beach is located along the Delaware Bay, east of the Prime Hook National Wildlife Refuge at the end of Prime Hook Road, to the northeast of Milton.
