= Jean Delaire =

French orthodontist (1923–2022)

- Born: 20 June 1923; Saint-Vincent-sur-Jard, France
- Died: 29 November 2022 (aged 99); Les Sables-d'Olonne, France
- Education: University of Nantes
- Known for: Developed Reverse Pull Headgear or Delaire Protraction Facemask
- Medical career
- Profession: stomatologist

Jean Guy Eugene Raymond Delaire (20 June 1923 – 29 November 2022) was a French orthodontist known for developing the Delair Facemask or reverse headgear. This facemask is used to treat children who have maxillary retrognathism and mandibular prognathism.

== Life ==
Delaire was born in Saint-Vincent-sur-Jard on 20 June 1923. He received his medical degree from University of Nantes in 1953. After that, he became a Stomatology specialist in 1957. In 1959, he became the chief of staff of the Department of Stomatology and Maxillofacial Surgery at University of Nantes. In 1972, he specialized in plastic surgery and in 1978 he specialized in oral-maxillofacial surgery. In his lifetime, he performed many surgeries related to cleft lip and palate, dysgnathias and TMJ abnormalities. He developed the protraction facemask in 1970s which was used in children with mandibular prognathism.

Delaire wrote over 300 scientific articles and published around 8 textbooks. He also served as President and Chairman of many organizations and departments. He was honorary fellow of British Association of Oral and Maxillofacial Surgeons and Canadian Society of Oral and Maxillofacial Surgeons.

Delaire retired in 1991. He was honoured by Dalhousie University in 2001.

Delaire died in Les Sables-d'Olonne on 29 November 2022, at the age of 99.

== Awards and positions ==
- Department of Stomatology, Maxillofacial Surgery, and Orthodontics, University of Nantes - Chairman
- Dental Institute, University of Nantes - Director
- French Stomatological Society, Past - President
- French Society of Orthodontists, Past - President
- French Society of Maxillofacial Surgeons, Past - President
- European Association for Cranio-Maxillo-Facial Surgery. - Past - President
- Ordre des Palmes Académiques Award
- Chevalier de la Legion d’Honneur Award
- le Trophee Odontologique de Marseille
