= Overbrook (Greenville, South Carolina) =

Coordinates: 34.8598398°N 82.3778985°W

Overbrook is a neighborhood in Greenville, South Carolina. It is a neighborhood built in 1913 upon expansion of the trolley line that was extended into the area three years earlier. Bungalow homes were built in this area from 1913 to 1924. Overbrook was developed by the Woodside brothers, who had made their fortunes managing the Woodside Cotton Mill, at one point the largest textile plant in the World.

The trolley, called "The Toonerville Trolley", remained popular and continued despite the switch to bus transportation in 1928.

Its ZIP code is 29607.

The neighborhood is bordered by Pleasantburg Drive to the west, East North Street to the south, Stone Avenue to the east, and Laurens Road to the north. Interstate 385 runs through this neighborhood at Exits 40B and 42.
