= Overbrook High School =

Overbrook High School may refer to:

- Overbrook High School (Philadelphia)
- Overbrook High School (New Jersey) in Pine Hill, New Jersey
