= Edgemoor, Delaware =

Census-designated place in Delaware, United States

- CDP
- Location in New Castle County and the state of Delaware

- Location within the state of Delaware Edgemoor (the United States)
- Coordinates: 39°45′00″N 75°29′59″W
- Country: United States
- State: Delaware
- County: New Castle

Area
  - Total: 2.18 sq mi (5.64 km^{2})
  - Land: 1.92 sq mi (4.97 km^{2})
  - Water: 0.26 sq mi (0.67 km^{2})
- Elevation: 30 ft (9.1 m)

Population (2020)
  - Total: 6,635
  - Density: 3,458.8/sq mi (1,335.45/km^{2})
- Time zone: UTC-5 (Eastern (EST))
  - Summer (DST): UTC-4 (EDT)
- ZIP codes: 19802, 19809, 19810
- Area code: 302
- FIPS code: 10-23240
- GNIS feature ID: 213930

Edgemoor is a census-designated place in New Castle County, Delaware, United States. As of the 2020 census, Edgemoor had a population of 6,635.

== Geography ==
Edgemoor is located at 39°45′00″N 75°29′59″W (39.7501139, -75.4996414).

According to the United States Census Bureau, the CDP has a total area of 1.8 square miles (4.7 km^{2}), of which 1.8 square miles (4.7 km^{2}) is land and 0.55% is water.

== History ==
Edgemoor was originally developed as a village by the Edgemoor Iron Company in 1871.

== Demographics ==
Historical population
Census	Pop.	Note	%±
1980	7,397		—
1990	5,853		−20.9%
2000	5,992		2.4%
2010	5,677		−5.3%
2020	6,635		16.9%

=== 2020 census ===
As of the 2020 census, Edgemoor had a population of 6,635. The median age was 39.5 years. 21.0% of residents were under the age of 18 and 16.3% of residents were 65 years of age or older. For every 100 females there were 83.9 males, and for every 100 females age 18 and over there were 79.9 males age 18 and over.

100.0% of residents lived in urban areas, while 0.0% lived in rural areas.

There were 3,009 households in Edgemoor, of which 26.5% had children under the age of 18 living in them. Of all households, 28.6% were married-couple households, 21.9% were households with a male householder and no spouse or partner present, and 40.8% were households with a female householder and no spouse or partner present. About 37.0% of all households were made up of individuals and 14.0% had someone living alone who was 65 years of age or older.

There were 3,237 housing units, of which 7.0% were vacant. The homeowner vacancy rate was 1.0% and the rental vacancy rate was 7.8%.

Racial composition as of the 2020 census
Race	Number	Percent
White	3,127	47.1%
Black or African American	2,654	40.0%
American Indian and Alaska Native	11	0.2%
Asian	199	3.0%
Native Hawaiian and Other Pacific Islander	1	0.0%
Some other race	165	2.5%
Two or more races	478	7.2%
Hispanic or Latino (of any race)	434	6.5%

=== 2000 census ===
As of the 2000 census, there were 5,992 people, 2,507 households, and 1,566 families living in the CDP. The population density was 3,288.3 inhabitants per square mile (1,269.6/km^{2}). There were 2,851 housing units at an average density of 1,564.6 per square mile (604.1/km^{2}). The racial makeup of the CDP was 62.27% White, 33.58% African American, 0.20% Native American, 1.15% Asian, 0.02% Pacific Islander, 0.98% from other races, and 1.80% from two or more races. Hispanic or Latino people of any race were 2.72% of the population.

There were 2,507 households, out of which 32.7% had children under the age of 18 living with them, 38.1% were married couples living together, 19.5% had a female householder with no husband present, and 37.5% were non-families. 31.8% of all households were made up of individuals, and 9.2% had someone living alone who was 65 years of age or older. The average household size was 2.38 and the average family size was 3.02.

In the CDP, the population was spread out, with 28.2% under the age of 18, 6.9% from 18 to 24, 32.5% from 25 to 44, 21.5% from 45 to 64, and 10.9% who were 65 years of age or older. The median age was 35 years. For every 100 females, there were 85.1 males. For every 100 females age 18 and over, there were 79.3 males.

The median income for a household in the CDP was $39,931, and the median income for a family was $45,903. Males had a median income of $36,957 versus $29,675 for females. The per capita income for the CDP was $22,081. About 13.4% of families and 15.0% of the population were below the poverty line, including 31.1% of those under age 18 and 1.2% of those age 65 or over.

== Education ==
Edgemoor is in the Brandywine School District.

Zoned schools are as follows:

- Most of the CDP is zoned to Mount Pleasant Elementary School, while some parts are zoned to Harlan Elementary.
- All of the CDP is zoned to P. S. DuPont Middle School,
- Most of the CDP is zoned to Mount Pleasant High School, while some parts are zoned to Brandywine High School.
