= Area code 302 =

US telephone area code for Delaware

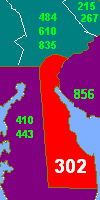
Numbering plan areas and area codes of Delaware

Area code 302 is a telephone area code in the North American Numbering Plan (NANP) for the U.S. state of Delaware. It is Delaware's only area code, and was assigned in 1947 as one of the original North American area codes.

Despite the rapid growth in telecommunication services in the northern part of the state, area code 302 is not projected to exhaust its numbering pool until 2033.

Prior to October 2021, area code 302 had telephone numbers assigned for the central office code 988. In 2020, 988 was designated nationwide as a dialing code for the National Suicide Prevention Lifeline, which created a conflict for exchanges that permit seven-digit dialing. This area code was therefore scheduled to transition to ten-digit dialing by October 24, 2021.

Delaware shares a LATA with Philadelphia and the Pennsylvania side of the Philadelphia metropolitan area.

Delaware area codes: 302
	North: 610/484/835	
West: 410/443/667	302	East: 856, 609/640, Atlantic Ocean
	South: 410/443/667	
Maryland area codes: 301/240/227, 410/443/667
New Jersey area codes: 201/551, 609/640, 732/848, 856, 908, 852/973
Pennsylvania area codes: 215/267/445, 412, 570/272, 610/484/835, 717/223, 724, 814/582, 878
