= List of counties in Delaware =

Counties of Delaware
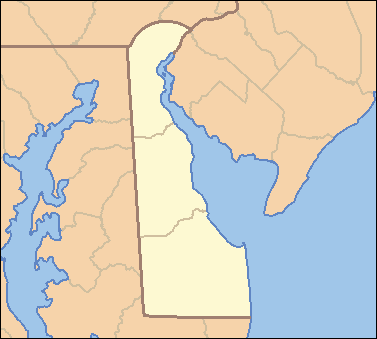
- Location: State of Delaware
- Number: 3
- Populations: 194,786 (Kent) – 588,026 (New Castle)
- Areas: 494 square miles (1,280 km^{2}) (New Castle) – 1,196 square miles (3,100 km^{2}) (Sussex)
- Government: County government
- Subdivisions: Municipality

The U.S. state of Delaware is divided into three counties, the fewest of any state in the United States: New Castle in the north, Kent in the center of the state, and Sussex in the south. The origin of the county boundaries goes back to their former court districts.

== Politics and government ==
Each county elects a legislative body (known in New Castle and Sussex counties as the County Council, and in Kent County as the Levy Court). The counties are able to raise taxes and borrow money. They also have control over garbage disposal, water supply, sewerage, zoning, development, and building codes.

Most functions which are handled on a county-by-county basis in other states—such as court and law enforcement—have been centralized in Delaware, leading to a significant concentration of power in the Delaware state government. The counties were historically divided into hundreds, which were used as tax reporting and voting districts until the 1960s. However, the hundreds now serve no administrative role; their only current official legal use is in real-estate title descriptions.

== History ==
Following the English conquest of 1664, all of the land on the western side of the Delaware River and Delaware Bay was governed as part of the New York Colony and administered from the town of New Castle. During the brief recapture of the colony by the Dutch in 1673, additional court districts were created around Upland and Whorekill. The latter was also known as Hoornkill, and is now the town of Lewes. The court at New Castle was left with the central portion of the colony. The jurisdiction left to the court at became New Castle County, and the county seat remained at New Castle until 1881 when it was moved to Wilmington. In 1680, Whorekill District was divided into Deale County and St. Jones County. After this division, Lewes became the county seat of Deale, which was later renamed Sussex County. The former Upland District was named after the New Sweden settlement of Upland, and was renamed Chester County in 1682. Chester County is now located within the present boundaries of Pennsylvania.

Lord Baltimore, the Proprietor of Maryland, claimed all present-day Delaware, and organized its northern and eastern portions as Durham County, Maryland. However, this county existed only on paper. The southern and western portions of present-day Sussex County were organized as portions of several adjacent Maryland counties and were not recognized as part of Delaware until the Mason–Dixon survey was run in 1767. In 1791, with the expansion of Sussex County to the south and west, the county seat was moved to Georgetown. The county seat of St. Jones (renamed Kent County in 1681) is at Dover.

After 2000, a fourth "Appoquinimink County" was proposed to be carved out of New Castle County. The effort intended to end the zoning restrictions of the Unified Development Code on the undeveloped farmland.

== County list ==
The Federal Information Processing Standard (FIPS) code, which is used by the United States government to uniquely identify counties, is provided with each entry. The FIPS code for each county links to census data for that county.

County	FIPS code	County seat	Est.	History	Etymology	Population	Area	Map
Kent County	001	Dover	June 21, 1680	Created from Whorekill (Hoarkill) District. Formerly known as St. Jones County.	The English county of Kent	194,786	800 sq mi (2,072 km^{2})	State map highlighting Kent County
New Castle County	003	Wilmington	September 12, 1673	Original County (Formally New Amstel)	The town of New Castle, Delaware as an Anglicization of Nieuw Amstel.	588,026	494 sq mi (1,279 km^{2})	State map highlighting New Castle County
Sussex County	005	Georgetown	September 12, 1673	Created from Whorekill (Hoarkill) District. Formerly known as Deale County	The English county of Sussex	277,140	1,196 sq mi (3,098 km^{2})	State map highlighting Sussex County

== Racial / Ethnic Profile of counties in Delaware (2020 Census) ==
Racial / Ethnic Profile of counties in Delaware (2020 Census)
Following is a table of counties in Delaware by race/ethnicity. The majority racial/ethnic group is coded per the key below.

Majority minority with no dominant group
Majority White
Majority Black
Majority Hispanic
Majority Asian
Majority Native American

Racial and ethnic composition of counties in Delaware (2020 Census) (NH = Non-Hispanic) Note: the US Census treats Hispanic/Latino as an ethnic category. This table excludes Latinos from the racial categories and assigns them to a separate category. Hispanics/Latinos may be of any race.
County	Location of County	Total Population	White alone (NH)	%	Black or African American alone (NH)	%	Native American or Alaska Native alone (NH)	%	Asian alone (NH)	%	Pacific Islander alone (NH)	%	Other race alone (NH)	%	Mixed race or Multiracial (NH)	%	Hispanic or Latino (any race)	%
Kent		181,851	104,845	57.65%	45,737	25.15%	864	0.48%	4,362	2.40%	107	0.06%	1,028	0.57%	10,927	6.01%	13,981	7.69%
New Castle		570,719	303,265	53.14%	142,388	24.95%	893	0.16%	35,022	6.14%	127	0.02%	2,555	0.45%	22,953	4.02%	63,516	11.13%
Sussex		237,378	171,741	72.35%	24,835	10.46%	764	0.32%	3,014	1.27%	70	0.03%	1,018	0.43%	9,143	3.85%	26,793	11.29%
