= List of municipalities in Delaware =

Map of the United States with Delaware highlighted

Delaware is a state located in the Southern United States. According to the 2016 United States Census estimate, Delaware is the 6th least populous state with 989,948 inhabitants and the 2nd smallest by land area spanning 1,948.54 square miles (5,046.7 km^{2}) of land. Delaware is divided into three counties and contains 57 incorporated places consisting of cities, towns, and villages. Of these, there are 10 cities, 3 villages, and 44 towns.

As of 2020, the largest municipality by population in Delaware is Wilmington with 70,898 residents, while the largest by area is Millsboro which spans 35.88 mi^{2} (92.9 km^{2}). The smallest municipality by both measurements is Hartly with 73 residents in an area of 0.057 mi^{2} (0.15 km^{2}).

== List of municipalities ==
Largest incorporated places in Delaware by population

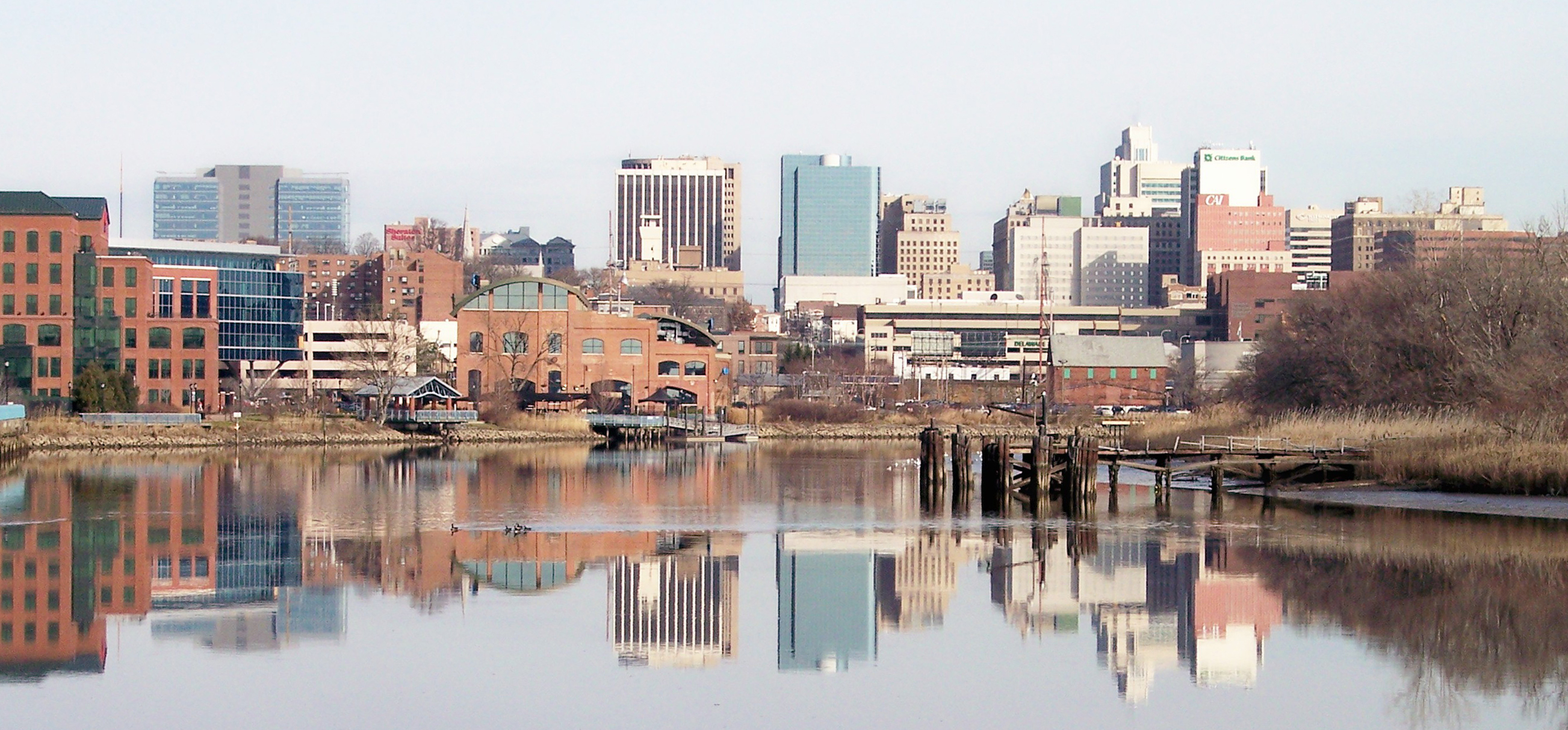
Skyline of Wilmington, the largest city in Delaware

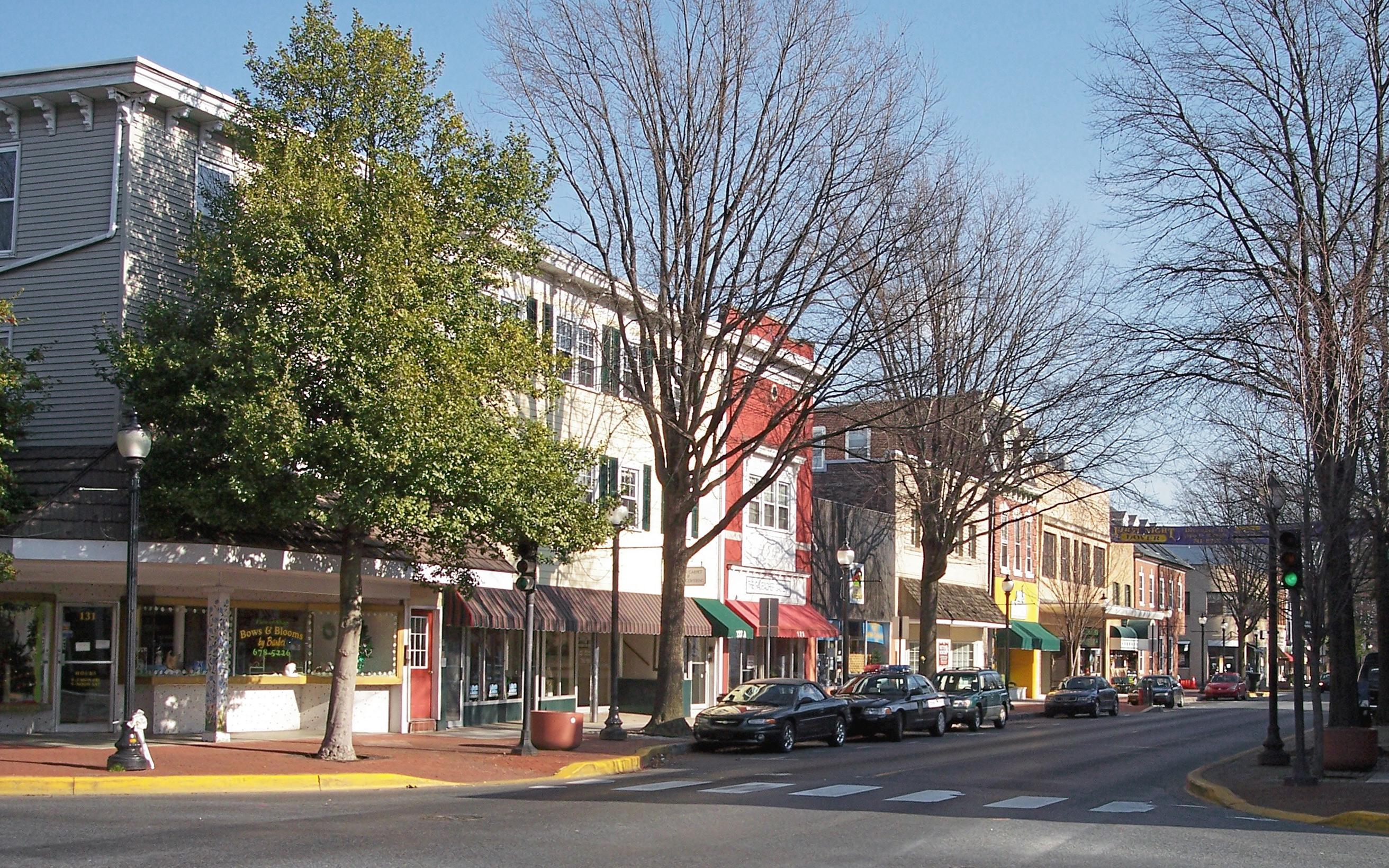
Downtown Dover, capital and second largest municipality of Delaware

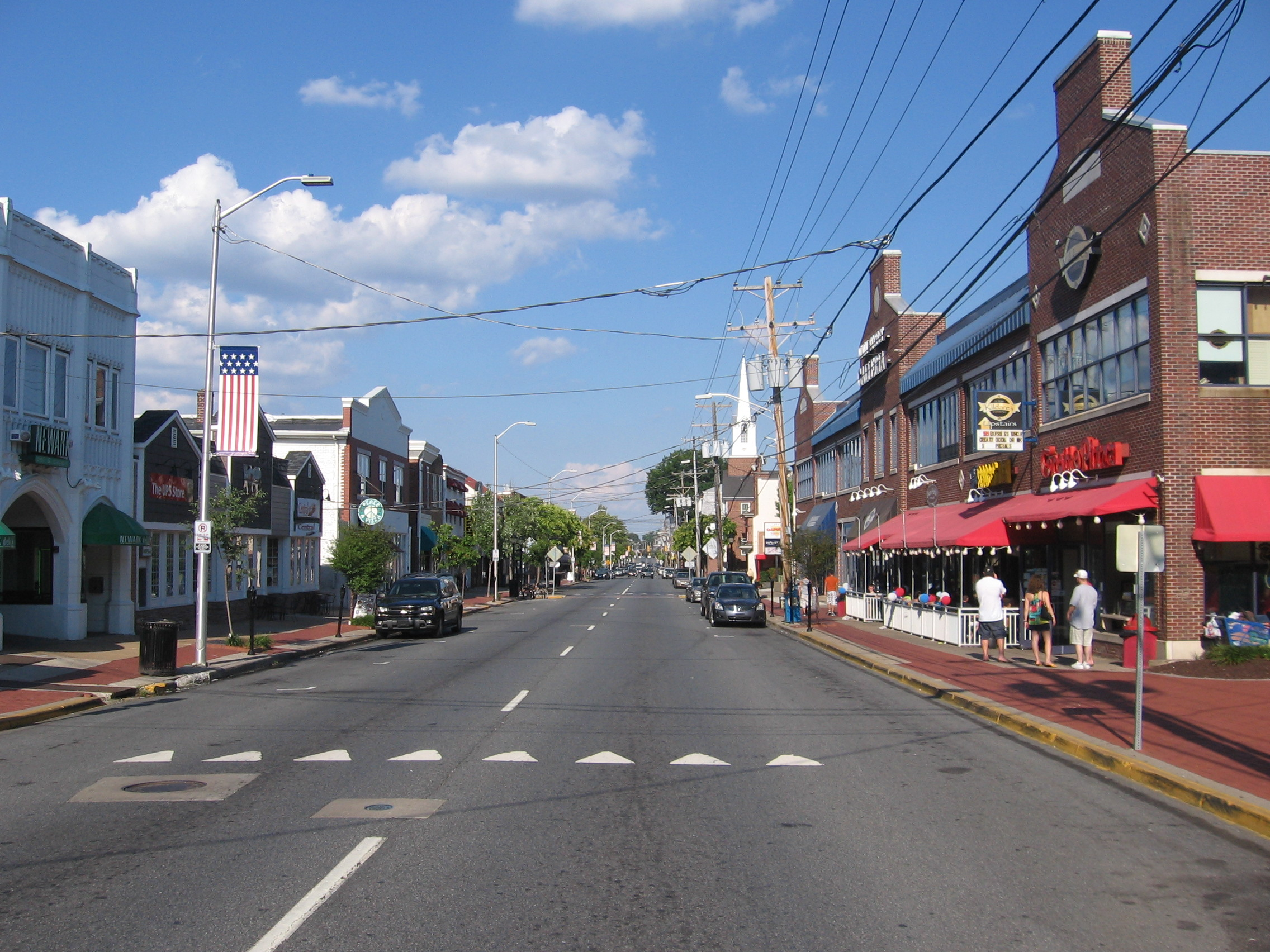
Downtown Newark, Delaware's third largest municipality

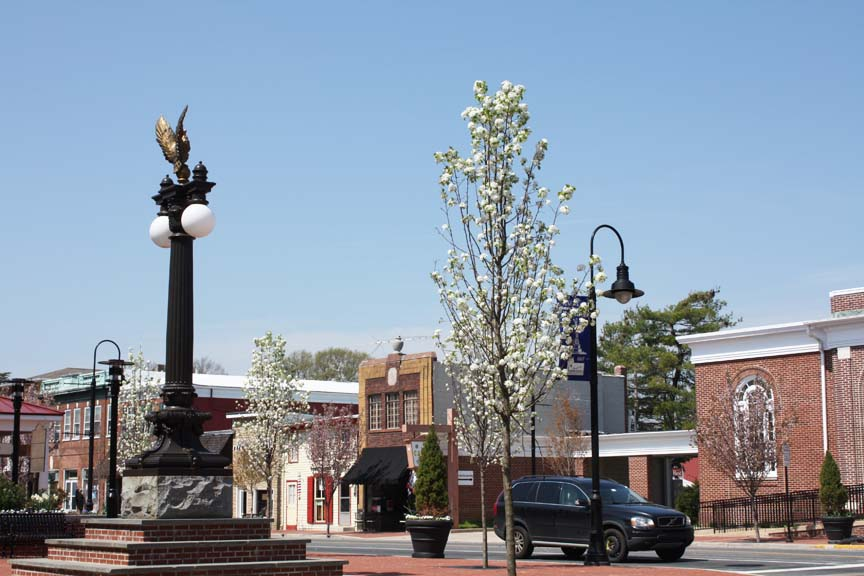
Downtown Middletown, fourth largest municipality in Delaware

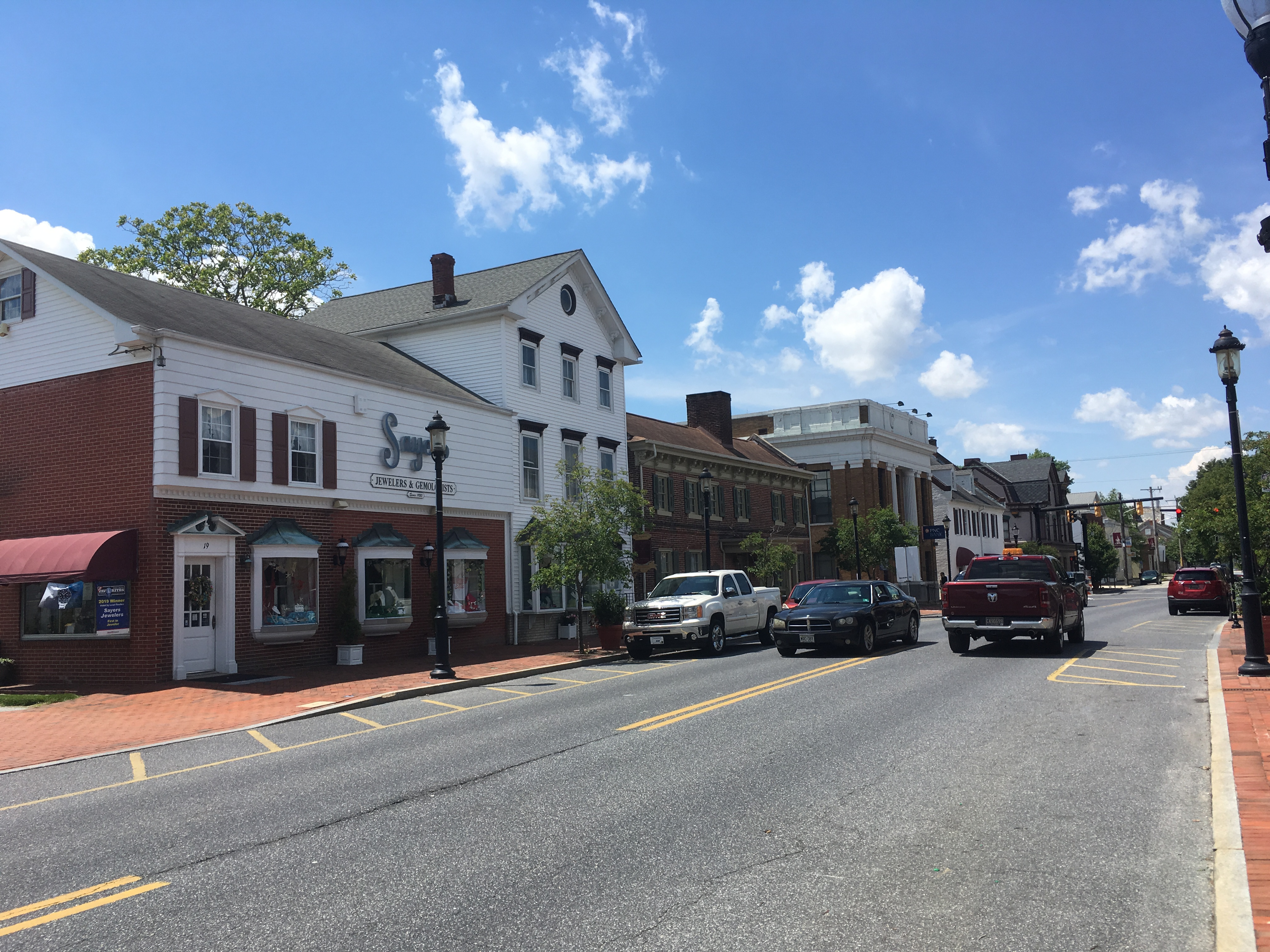
Downtown Smyrna, Delaware's fifth largest municipality

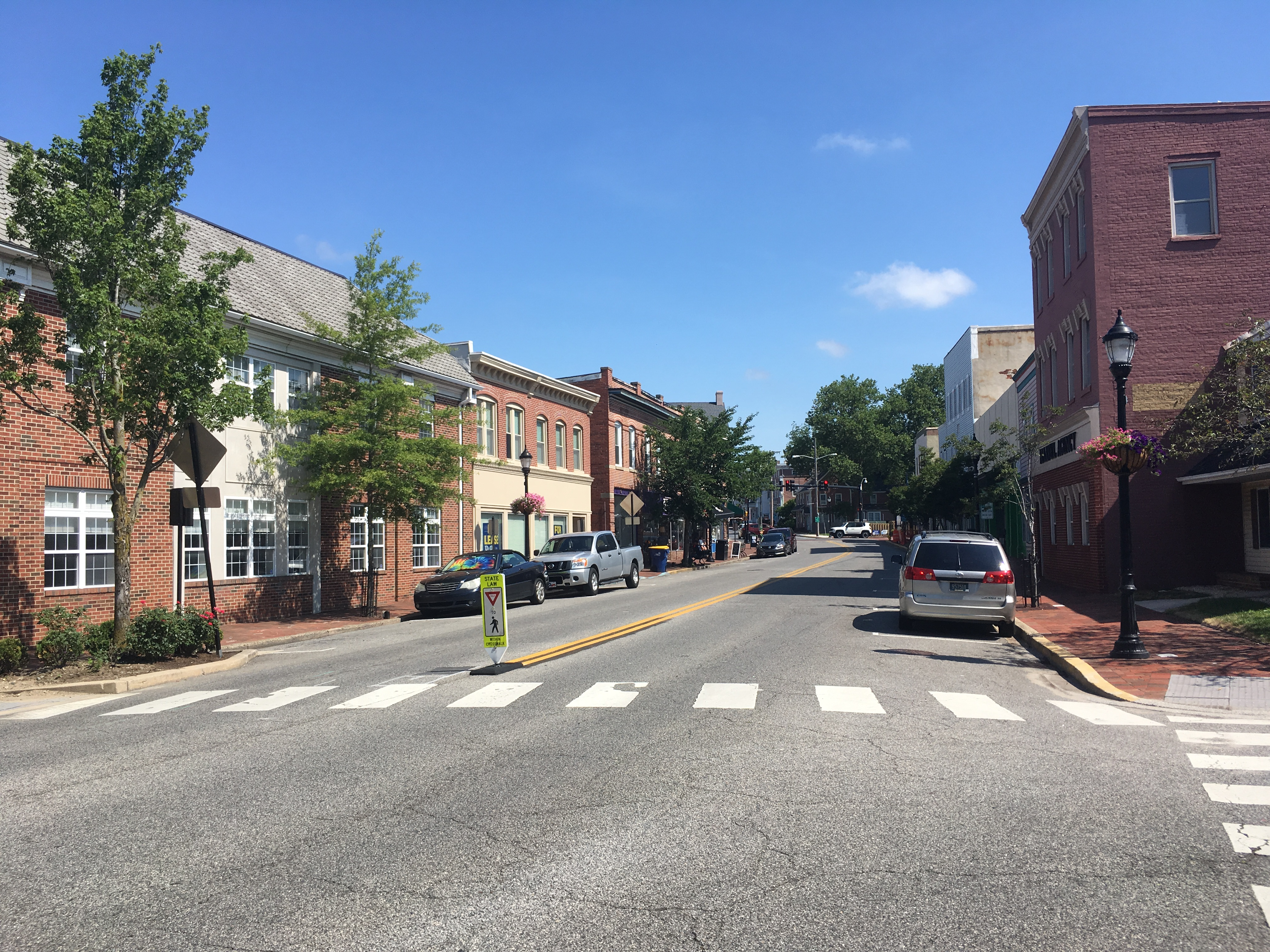
Downtown Milford, sixth largest municipality in Delaware

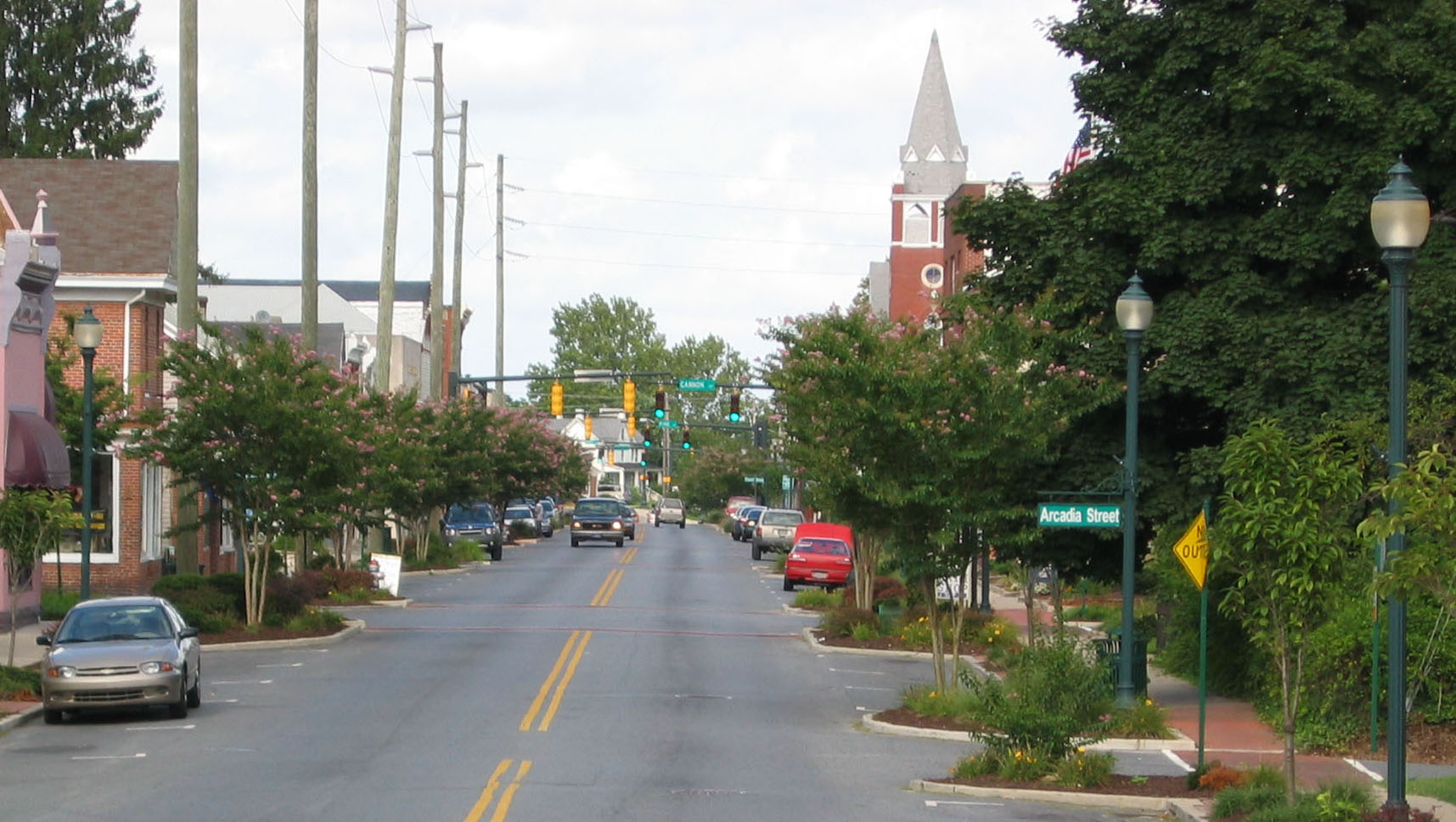
Downtown Seaford, Delaware's seventh largest municipality

†	County seat
‡	State capital and county seat

Name	Type	County(ies)	Population (2020)	Population (2010)	Change	Land area (2026)		Population density	Incorporated
Name	Type	County(ies)	Population (2020)	Population (2010)	Change	sq mi	km2	Population density	Incorporated
Arden	Village	New Castle	430	439	−2.1%	0.249	0.64	1,726.9/sq mi (666.8/km^{2})	December 22, 1965
Ardencroft	Village	New Castle	226	231	−2.2%	0.089	0.23	2,539.3/sq mi (980.4/km^{2})	July 7, 1976
Ardentown	Village	New Castle	255	264	−3.4%	0.234	0.61	1,089.7/sq mi (420.8/km^{2})	June 30, 1975
Bellefonte	Town	New Castle	1,225	1,193	+2.7%	0.202	0.52	6,920.9/sq mi (2,672.2/km^{2})	March 9, 1915
Bethany Beach	Town	Sussex	954	1,060	−10.0%	1.148	2.97	831.0/sq mi (320.9/km^{2})	March 29, 1909
Bethel	Town	Sussex	239	171	+39.8%	0.440	1.14	543.2/sq mi (209.7/km^{2})	April 4, 1907
Blades	Town	Sussex	1,179	1,241	−5.0%	0.553	1.43	2,120.5/sq mi (818.7/km^{2})	March 10, 1915
Bowers	Town	Kent	278	335	−17.0%	0.311	0.81	893.9/sq mi (345.1/km^{2})	March 9, 1907
Bridgeville	Town	Sussex	2,568	2,048	+25.4%	4.838	12.53	532.7/sq mi (205.7/km^{2})	March 29, 1871
Camden	Town	Kent	3,715	3,464	+7.2%	3.769	9.76	991.7/sq mi (382.9/km^{2})	1852
Cheswold	Town	Kent	1,923	1,380	+39.3%	1.95	5.1	1,046.2/sq mi (404.0/km^{2})	1856
Clayton	Town	Kent; New Castle	3,961	2,918	+35.7%	1.957	5.07	2,033.4/sq mi (785.1/km^{2})	1887
Dagsboro	Town	Sussex	870	805	+8.1%	1.438	3.72	605.0/sq mi (233.6/km^{2})	February 9, 1899
Delaware City	City	New Castle	1,885	1,695	+11.2%	1.861	4.82	1,012.9/sq mi (391.1/km^{2})	1851
Delmar	Town	Sussex	2,027	1,597	+26.9%	1.901	4.92	1,066.3/sq mi (411.7/km^{2})	March 9, 1899
Dewey Beach	Town	Sussex	353	341	+3.5%	0.331	0.86	1,066.5/sq mi (411.8/km^{2})	June 29, 1981
Dover‡	City	Kent	39,403	36,047	+9.3%	23.879	61.85	1,664.8/sq mi (642.8/km^{2})	1829
Ellendale	Town	Sussex	487	381	+27.8%	1.461	3.78	1,145.9/sq mi (442.4/km^{2})	March 30, 1905
Elsmere	Town	New Castle	6,229	6,131	+1.6%	0.987	2.56	6,311.0/sq mi (2,436.7/km^{2})	March 9, 1909
Farmington	Town	Kent	92	110	−16.4%	0.073	0.19	1,260.3/sq mi (486.6/km^{2})	March 15, 1909
Felton	Town	Kent	1,316	1,298	+1.4%	0.81	2.1	1,682.9/sq mi (649.8/km^{2})	February 21, 1861
Fenwick Island	Town	Sussex	343	379	−9.5%	0.331	0.86	1,036.3/sq mi (400.1/km^{2})	July 8, 1953
Frankford	Town	Sussex	790	847	−6.7%	1.178	3.05	1,083.7/sq mi (418.4/km^{2})	1883
Frederica	Town	Kent	1,073	774	+38.6%	1.752	4.54	616.3/sq mi (238.0/km^{2})	1826
Georgetown†	Town	Sussex	7,134	6,422	+11.1%	5.022	13.01	1,420.5/sq mi (548.5/km^{2})	March 2, 1869
Greenwood	Town	Sussex	990	973	+1.7%	0.828	2.14	1,246.9/sq mi (481.4/km^{2})	March 9, 1901
Harrington	City	Kent	3,774	3,562	+6.0%	3.098	8.02	1,385.5/sq mi (534.9/km^{2})	March 23, 1869
Hartly	Town	Kent	73	74	−1.4%	0.062	0.16	1,280.7/sq mi (494.5/km^{2})	March 23, 1869
Henlopen Acres	Town	Sussex	139	122	+13.9%	0.255	0.66	545.1/sq mi (210.5/km^{2})	June 4, 1970
Houston	Town	Kent	381	374	+1.9%	0.383	0.99	994.8/sq mi (384.1/km^{2})	March 26, 1913
Kenton	Town	Kent	215	261	−17.6%	0.184	0.48	1,221.6/sq mi (471.7/km^{2})	1887
Laurel	Town	Sussex	3,865	3,708	+4.2%	2.783	7.21	1,397.3/sq mi (539.5/km^{2})	April 13, 1883
Leipsic	Town	Kent	178	183	−2.7%	0.297	0.77	599.3/sq mi (231.4/km^{2})	February 26, 1852
Lewes	City	Sussex	3,303	2,747	+20.2%	4.228	10.95	787.9/sq mi (304.2/km^{2})	February 2, 1818
Little Creek	Town	Kent	195	224	−12.9%	0.099	0.26	1,969.7/sq mi (760.5/km^{2})	1899
Magnolia	Town	Kent	277	225	+23.1%	0.196	0.51	1,413.3/sq mi (545.7/km^{2})	April 3, 1885
Middletown	Town	New Castle	23,192	18,871	+22.9%	13.508	34.99	1,856.0/sq mi (716.6/km^{2})	February 12, 1861
Milford	City	Sussex; Kent	11,190	9,559	+17.1%	9.862	25.54	1,135.7/sq mi (438.5/km^{2})	February 5, 1807
Millsboro	Town	Sussex	6,863	3,877	+77.0%	5.142	13.32	1,343.1/sq mi (518.6/km^{2})	March 9, 1893
Millville	Town	Sussex	1,825	544	+235.5%	2.562	6.64	715.1/sq mi (276.1/km^{2})	April 11, 1907
Milton	Town	Sussex	3,291	2,576	+27.8%	2.663	6.90	1,842.7/sq mi (711.5/km^{2})	March 17, 1865
New Castle	City	New Castle	5,551	5,285	+5.0%	3.478	9.01	1,596.0/sq mi (616.2/km^{2})	February 25, 1875
Newark	City	New Castle	30,601	31,454	−2.7%	9.474	24.54	3,246.1/sq mi (1,253.3/km^{2})	1758
Newport	Town	New Castle	910	1,055	−13.7%	0.467	1.21	1,952.8/sq mi (754.0/km^{2})	April 17, 1873
Ocean View	Town	Sussex	2,636	1,882	+40.1%	2.828	7.32	950.6/sq mi (367.0/km^{2})	April 13, 1889
Odessa	Town	New Castle	366	364	+0.5%	0.507	1.31	721.9/sq mi (278.7/km^{2})	April 4, 1873
Rehoboth Beach	City	Sussex	1,108	1,327	−16.5%	1.175	3.04	943.0/sq mi (364.1/km^{2})	March 19, 1891
Seaford	City	Sussex	7,957	6,928	+14.9%	5.082	13.16	1,562.6/sq mi (603.3/km^{2})	April 6, 1865
Selbyville	Town	Sussex	2,878	2,167	+32.8%	4.055	10.50	803.5/sq mi (310.2/km^{2})	March 16, 1901
Slaughter Beach	Town	Sussex	218	207	+5.3%	1.419	3.68	153.6/sq mi (59.3/km^{2})	1931
Smyrna	Town	Kent; New Castle	12,883	10,023	+28.5%	6.473	16.76	2,065.6/sq mi (797.5/km^{2})	1859
South Bethany	Town	Sussex	451	449	+0.4%	0.503	1.30	896.6/sq mi (346.2/km^{2})	June 18, 1969
Townsend	Town	New Castle	2,717	2,049	+32.6%	1.12	2.9	2,622.6/sq mi (1,012.6/km^{2})	April 3, 1885
Viola	Town	Kent	140	157	−10.8%	0.177	0.46	791.0/sq mi (305.4/km^{2})	1913
Wilmington†	City	New Castle	70,898	70,851	+0.1%	10.895	28.22	6,507.4/sq mi (2,512.5/km^{2})	1739
Woodside	Town	Kent	190	181	+5.0%	0.168	0.44	1,131.0/sq mi (436.7/km^{2})	April 4, 1911
Wyoming	Town	Kent	1,680	1,313	+28.0%	1.047	2.71	1,604.6/sq mi (619.5/km^{2})	March 20, 1869
Total municipalities	—	—	279,890	255,143	+9.7%	'146.564	379.60	1,909.7/sq mi (737.3/km^{2})	—
Delaware	—	—	989,948	897,934	+10.2%	1,948.0	5,045	508.2/sq mi (196.2/km^{2})	—

== See also ==
- List of census-designated places in Delaware
- List of counties in Delaware
- List of places in Delaware
