= Ardens Historic District =

Historic district in Delaware, United States

- U.S. National Register of Historic Places
- U.S. Historic district
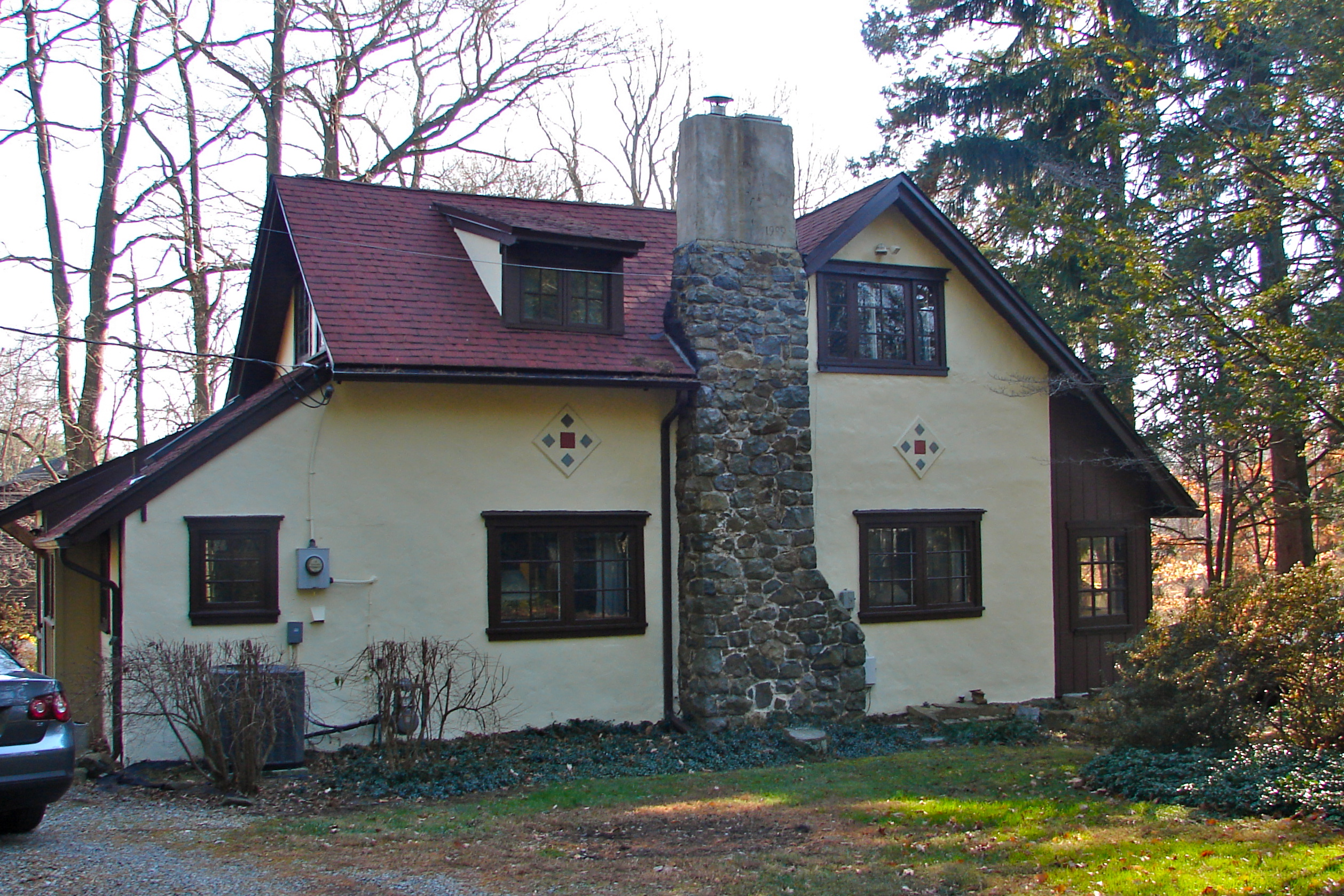
- Green Gate house in November 2010

- Location within Delaware Location within the United States
- Location: Orleans Rd. at Harvey Rd., Ardentown and Ardencroft, Delaware
- Coordinates: 39°48′41″N 75°29′16″W
- Area: 380 acres (150 ha)
- Built: 1900
- Architect: William L. Price, Frank Stephens
- Architectural style: Late 19th And Early 20th Century American Movements, barn
- NRHP reference No.: 01001245
- Added to NRHP: May 30, 2003

Ardens Historic District is a national historic district which encompasses the three villages of Arden, Ardentown and Ardencroft in New Castle County, Delaware, United States. It encompasses 563 contributing buildings, 21 contributing sites, 15 contributing structures, and 6 contributing objects.

It was listed on the National Register of Historic Places in 2003.
