= Tri-State Mall =

Defunct mall in Claymont, Delaware, U.S.

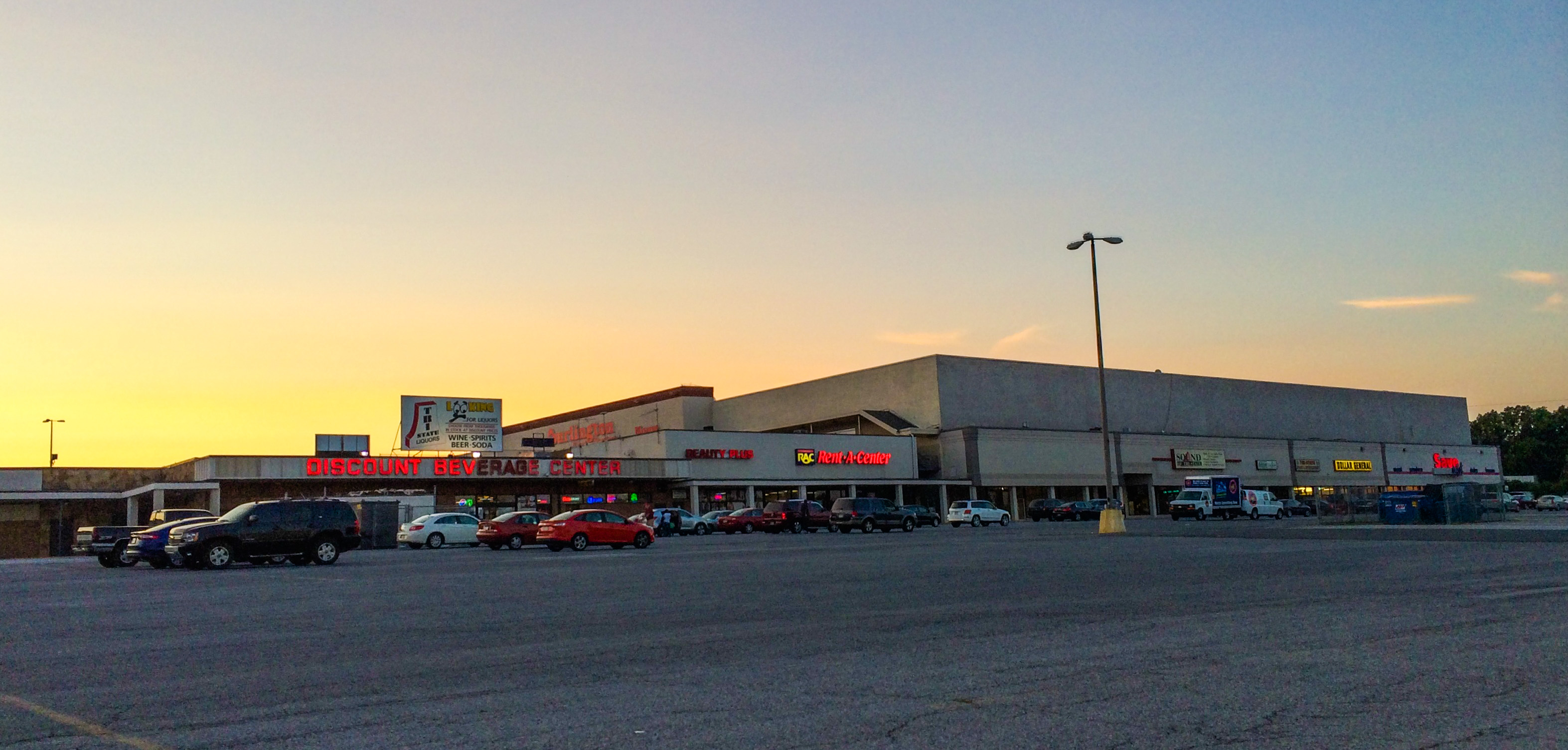
- Exterior view of Tri-State Mall, October 2014
- Location: Claymont, Delaware, U.S.
- Coordinates: 39°48′57.53″N 75°26′54.70″W
- Address: 333 Naamans Road; Claymont, DE 19703
- Opened: August 19, 1970 (enclosed section)
- Closed: November 27, 2015 (enclosed section)
- Demolished: 2023
- Developer: AAR Realty
- Owner: KPR Centers
- Num. of stores: Maximum of 50; split between enclosed and strip mall sections
- Floor area: 535,000 square feet (49,700 m^{2})
- Floors: 1 (enclosed section)
- Parking: Parking lot

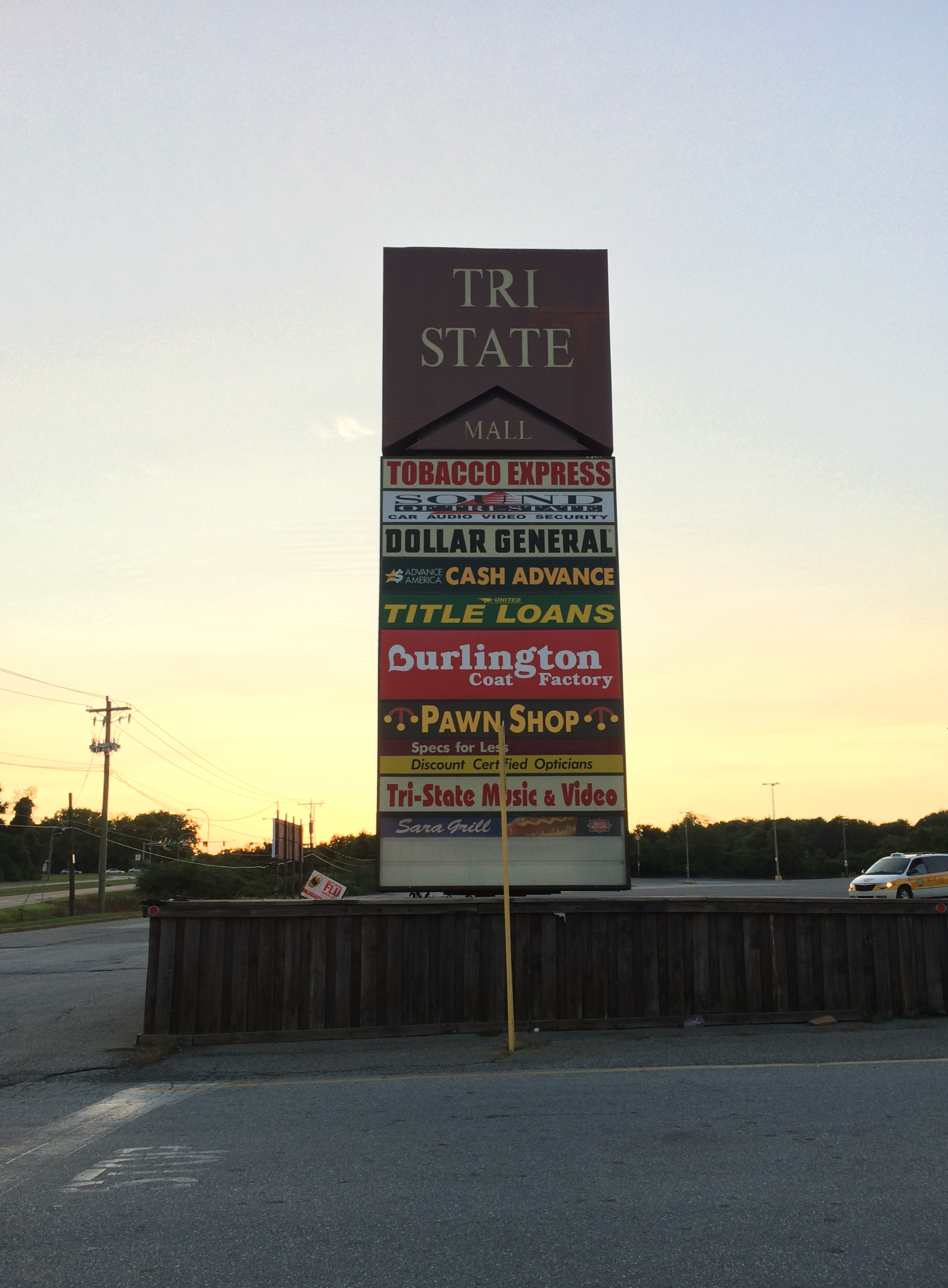
Sign for Tri-State Mall, October 2014

The Tri-State Mall was a shopping mall located on Delaware Route 92 (locally known as "Naamans Road") in Claymont, Delaware. The mall closed in 2015. At 535,000 square feet (49,700 m^{2}), it was the state's fourth-largest mall, with a maximum capacity of approximately 50 shops. It was located just off Interstate 95, less than a mile from the Pennsylvania/Delaware border. The last remaining anchor store was Burlington, which closed in 2017. The mall building was completely demolished in 2023. The only remaining retail tenant on the site is Tri-State Liquors, which relocated to a stand-alone building in 2024.

== Layout ==
The Tri-State Mall consisted of two distinct sections, an enclosed mall and a connected strip mall. The enclosed mall was a single-level building arranged in a cross shape. A movie theater was located on the northern end of the cross, while department stores anchored the eastern and western ends. A covered, exterior staircase on the building's eastern end led to an adjacent strip mall on a lower level of the property. An additional anchor tenant occupied a stand-alone building in the lower-level parking lot.

== History ==
=== Construction and opening ===
A mall was first proposed at this location in 1964 by Wilmington Dry Goods Co., a local department store. The property was chosen due to its location near a future I-95 interchange, with the intention of drawing residents of Pennsylvania and New Jersey.

The mall was developed by A.A.R. Realty, who remained the owners of the mall through its entire existence. By 1967, the mall had signed its most important tenants—Wilmington Dry Goods and W.T. Grant to anchor the enclosed portion of the mall, a Pantry Pride grocery store to anchor the lower-level strip mall, and a free-standing Levitz Furniture. Construction began in March 1968, with the cost estimated at $10 million.

Later in 1968, Sameric Theatres unveiled a proposal to build a 1,400-seat single-screen movie theater at the new mall. Before the mall opened, however, plans changed and the theater would instead open as a twin-screen cinema, making it Delaware's first multiplex.

The strip shopping center opened first, with Levitz Furniture and a Silo appliance store opening by the fall of 1969. Wilmington Dry Goods followed, opening on November 5, 1969. The Pantry Pride supermarket opened on March 10, 1970. W.T. Grant (known as Grants) opened on May 14, 1970, complete with an in-store restaurant called the Bradford Room.

The enclosed mall officially opened on August 19, 1970. Designed by Seymour Seiler and Associates of New York, the interior was described by a local newspaper: "Its center has carpeted rest areas with comfortable seating amid artificial plantings. Ceilings of the mall area and the adjacent stores are designed with almost imperceptible curves, so that they make play of light and shadow." An opening-week ad promised "a delightful experience in a year-round controlled climate, maintained at a constant 72° by electric heat and air conditioning. The largest enclosed shopping mall in Delaware, Tri-State is also the most modern ..."

The mall's first movie theater, called the Eric I, opened three months later on November 11, 1970. It included several high-end features for its era, including both 35- and 70-millimeter projectors, a 60-foot (18 m) screen, and "1,200 rocker-lounger seats, so spaced to eliminate having to get up to let other patrons into the row." A second and smaller theater, the Eric II, opened six weeks later with 650 seats. The theater would eventually expand to five screens.

=== Peak years ===
The mall housed numerous specialty shops, eateries, and service businesses from the 1970s through the 1990s, catering mostly to blue-collar customers. The mall was well-positioned to draw both locals and Pennsylvanians seeking tax-free shopping, as it specialized in value-oriented discount stores.

W.T. Grant closed due to the chain's bankruptcy in 1976, and was replaced by K-Mart on August 18, 1976.

Wilmington Dry Goods entered bankruptcy protection in 1988. In May 1989, Schottenstein Stores bought five of the seven Dry Goods stores for $13.8 million as part of a court-ordered auction. The company announced that the stores, including the Tri-State Mall location, would be renovated and reopened as Value City department stores. The Dry Goods store closed in July 1989 and reopened as Value City in October of the same year.

In 1991, Delaware became one of the original states offering the Powerball lottery game. Prior to the Pennsylvania and New Jersey lotteries joining Powerball, out-of-state residents would often travel to the Tri-State Mall for lottery tickets. This created a significant "windfall" for mall merchants when jackpots were high.

The mall completed some minor renovations in the mid-1990s, changing the mall's paint scheme and replacing dated signage.

=== Declining years and troubles ===
The mall frequently struggled with an unsafe reputation. At least two major crimes occurred at the mall. In a 1981 case, a woman who worked at the mall was raped and murdered as she was trying to leave the building. A decade later, a man was killed at the mall during a drug deal gone bad.

The movie theater was renamed the Cinemagic 5 in 1994, before becoming a second-run discount theater. It permanently closed c. 1999, but the theater was briefly revived as a live comedy club, beginning in 2005. The Levitz furniture store closed in 2006, while Value City closed in February 2008 due to the chain's impending bankruptcy.

In the fall of 2008, the Value City space was replaced by Burlington Coat Factory, after Value City's parent company agreed to hand over two dozen locations to the rival chain. The opening of Burlington would be the last major high point for the mall. According to the Wilmington, DE News Journal, "the mall's fortunes began to turn around the turn of the century as national brick-and-mortar retailers started to struggle and the mall suffered from a dangerous reputation." The closure of the Evraz Claymont steel mill in 2013 also hurt the mall.

The Kmart store closed in early December 2014. The enclosed portion of the mall closed in 2015. By June 2016, Claymont residents were considering ideas for redevelopment of the area, including the mall, at community workshops.

The last remaining anchor tenant, Burlington, closed its store at the mall in 2017 and relocated to Route 202 (Concord Pike) in North Wilmington. In 2019, the enclosed mall and upper-level parking lot were taken over by New Hudson Facades, an architectural company that used the space for storage. After the enclosed mall was shuttered, the lower-level strip mall remained open, with tenants including Dollar General and Save-A-Lot. By 2023, however, all the remaining stores had closed, with the exception of Tri-State Liquors.

=== Demolition and future ===
The entire 41-acre (17 ha) property was purchased in 2021 by KPR Centers for $12.5 million. The mall and its surrounding buildings were razed in phases between 2021 and 2024, starting with the Levitz Furniture building.

Tri-State Liquors, which had been a tenant at the mall since 1984, was the last remaining business in the lower-level strip center. Thanks to a long-term lease agreement, the property owners constructed a new building for the store on the site of the previous Levitz Furniture building. Tri-State Liquors opened in their new stand-alone facility on January 11, 2024.

The owners of the Tri-State Mall property have unveiled a plan to construct a 525,000-square-foot (48,800 m^{2}) logistics warehouse on the remainder of the site. The property is considered a good fit for a warehouse or fulfillment center due to its proximity to I-95.
