= Arden, Delaware =

- Village
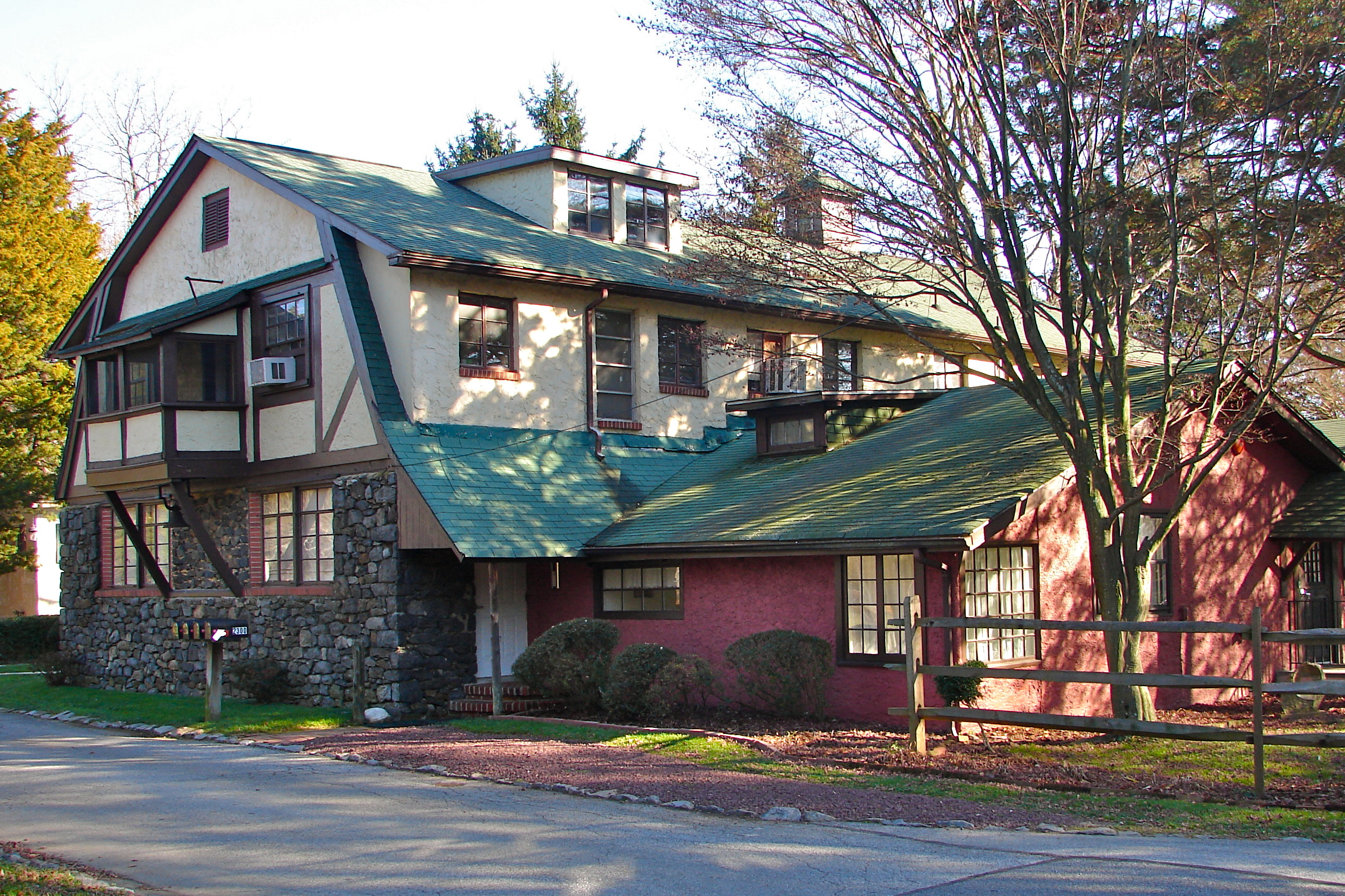
- Arden Craft Shop, Museum and Archive
- Motto: "You are welcome hither"
- Location of Arden in New Castle County, Delaware.

- Location within the state of Delaware Arden (the United States) Arden (North America)
- Coordinates: 39°48′33″N 75°29′12″W
- Country: United States
- State: Delaware
- County: New Castle
- Founded: 1900

Area
  - Total: 0.25 sq mi (0.65 km^{2})
  - Land: 0.25 sq mi (0.65 km^{2})
  - Water: 0 sq mi (0.00 km^{2})
- Elevation: 253 ft (77 m)

Population (2020)
  - Total: 430
  - Density: 1,726.4/sq mi (666.55/km^{2})
- Time zone: UTC-5 (Eastern (EST))
  - Summer (DST): UTC-4 (EDT)
- ZIP code: 19810
- Area code: 302
- FIPS code: 10-01400
- GNIS feature ID: 213569
- Website: arden.delaware.gov

Arden is a village in New Castle County, Delaware, United States, founded in 1900 as a radical Georgist single-tax community by sculptor Frank Stephens and architect William Lightfoot Price. The village occupies approximately 160 acres, with half kept as open land. As of the 2020 census, Arden had a population of 430. In 1973, the entire village was listed on the National Register of Historic Places.

Two neighboring villages of similar size were founded on Georgist principles, Ardentown, in 1922, and Ardencroft, in 1950. In 2003, they were also listed on the NRHP as the Ardens Historic District. Many Ardenites, as the villagers of Arden are called, consider themselves to be "close-knit, nature-loving, liberal, tolerant, free-spirited, artistic, intellectual, even ex-hippie".

== History ==
Arden was founded in 1900 by sculptor Frank Stephens and architect William Lightfoot Price, based on ideas such as Henry George's single-tax, William Morris's Arts and Crafts principles, and Peter Kropotkin's theories of community. Philanthropist Joseph Fels funded the project.

The single-tax movement, popular in the U.S. and other countries from the 1890s until the 1930s, is based on the belief that the best way to raise government money was to tax only the value of unimproved land and the public-created value, like roads, added to the land. The tax, based on a systematized assessment, would recover both the value of natural resources and public investment for the public, while not impeding labor and capital from profiting from their efforts. Followers of Henry George's philosophy of economics created Arden as an experiment in the single-tax idea after a failed attempt to implement Georgism in the entire state of Delaware in the late 19th century.

Englishman William Morris rebelled against modern cities and industry. He advocated a return to craft production, good design, and village life. Kropotkin was primarily an anarcho-communist whose ideas regarding social and community living were used by the founders of Arden to advance Morris' ideas for the return to village life.

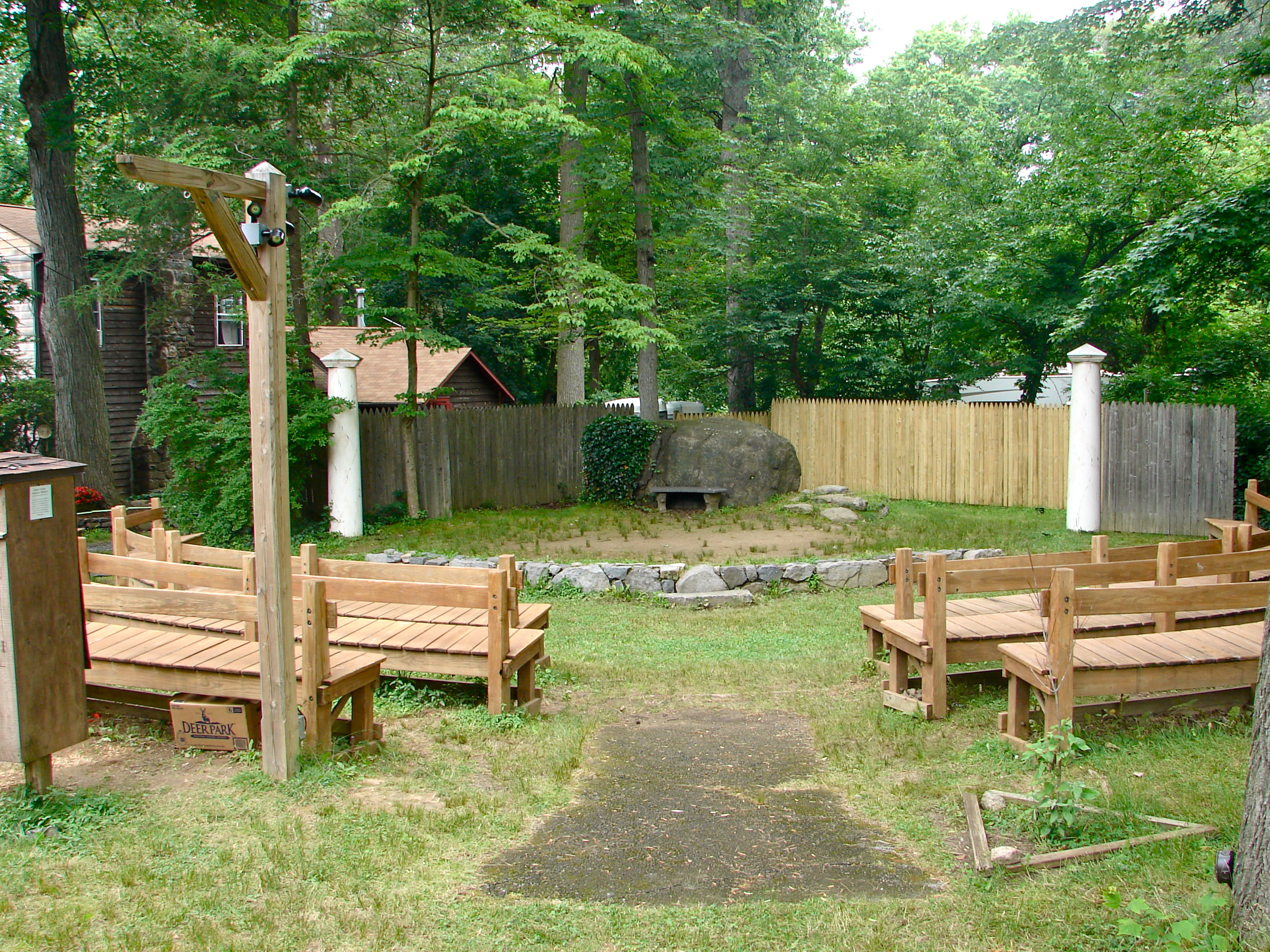
Stephens Theater

Land in Arden cannot be sold; instead it has a renewable 99-year lease. The leasehold interest in the land has a market value and can be sold. People are free to improve it as they choose, but the land-lease fee will not increase because of improvements. Arden is not exempt from New Castle County land taxes, but the buildings within the village are taxed separately for county and school district revenue, while the land is technically one large parcel, and taxed by New Castle County accordingly. The land is held in a trust, administered by three elected trustees, who have lifelong tenure. Arden's tax structure is currently based upon the individual leaseholds. Most leaseholds are residential, and the land rent is based upon the square footage rather than the improvements upon the land. A board of assessors divides the County's full assessment of the residential areas of Arden among the individual lots. Lots that are nearer to open space or woodlands are assessed a bit higher, while lots nearer main road are assessed a bit lower.

The Board of Assessors consists of seven members, who are elected using single transferable vote (STV) to ensure both majority control and representation of minority viewpoints. Starting in 1912, this is the longest use of STV by any residential community in the United States.

At first, Arden was a summer community. People lived the simple life in tents or rustic dwellings. By 1909, much of the land had been leased, mostly for summer use. By 1922 there were 148 leaseholders, 100 buildings, 350 summer residents, and 100 winter residents.

The founding of the Arden Club, a volunteer-run community center, in 1908 provided an organizational core for community activity. Interest groups and task groups were called gilds [sic] rather than committees. From the beginning, Shakespeare's plays were produced in the outdoor Field Theater. Fairs, pageants, and Arden holidays filled the calendar. Many of these events continue today through various community organizations including the Arden Community Recreation Association (ACRA) and the Arden Club, as well as through some of the village committees for each of the three Ardens. The Georgist Gild no longer exists (ended in 2014), but the Georgists continues to offer courses in Georgist economics to the Ardens and any other interested communities.

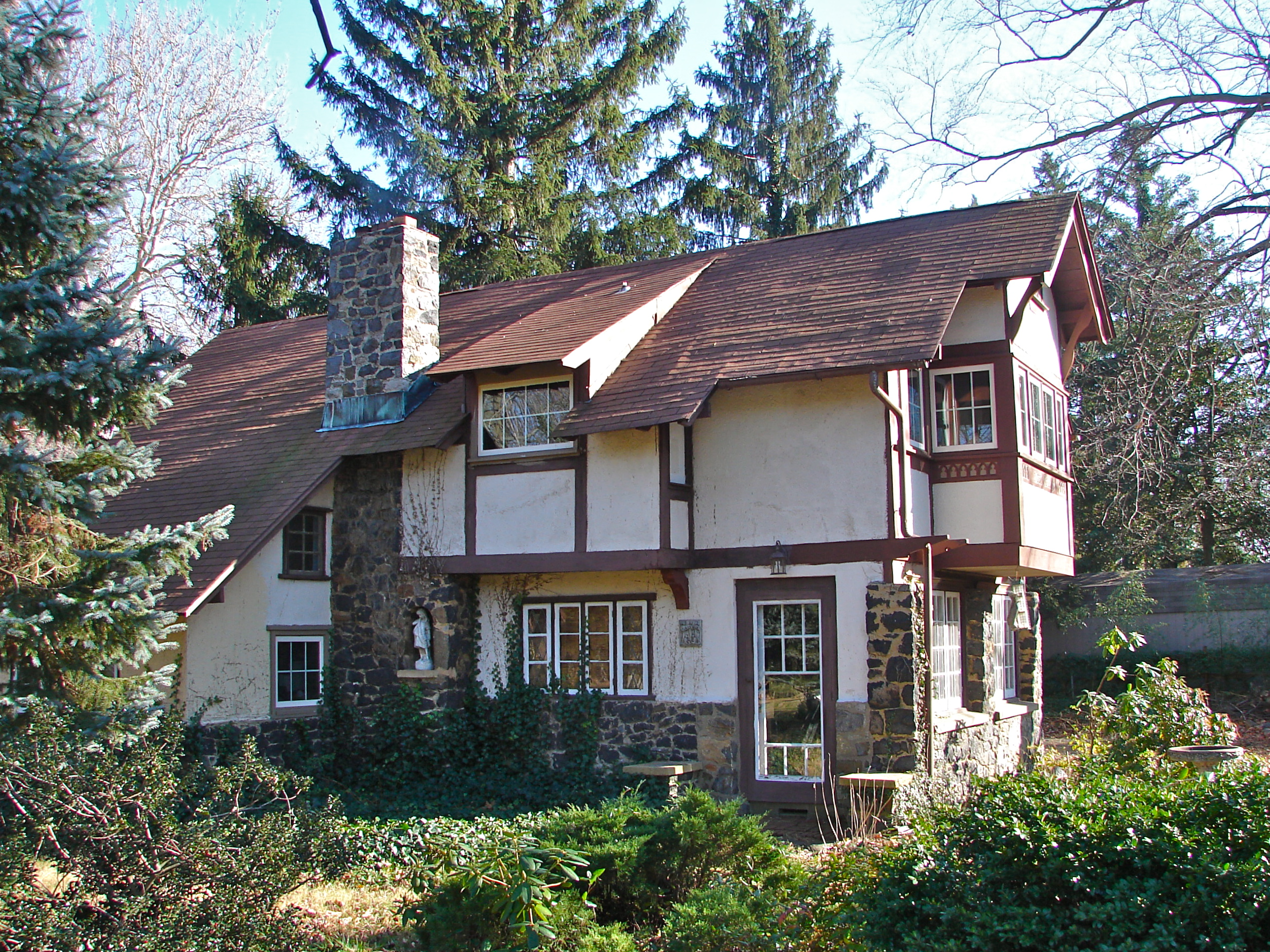
"Rest Cottage" designed by William Lightfoot Price

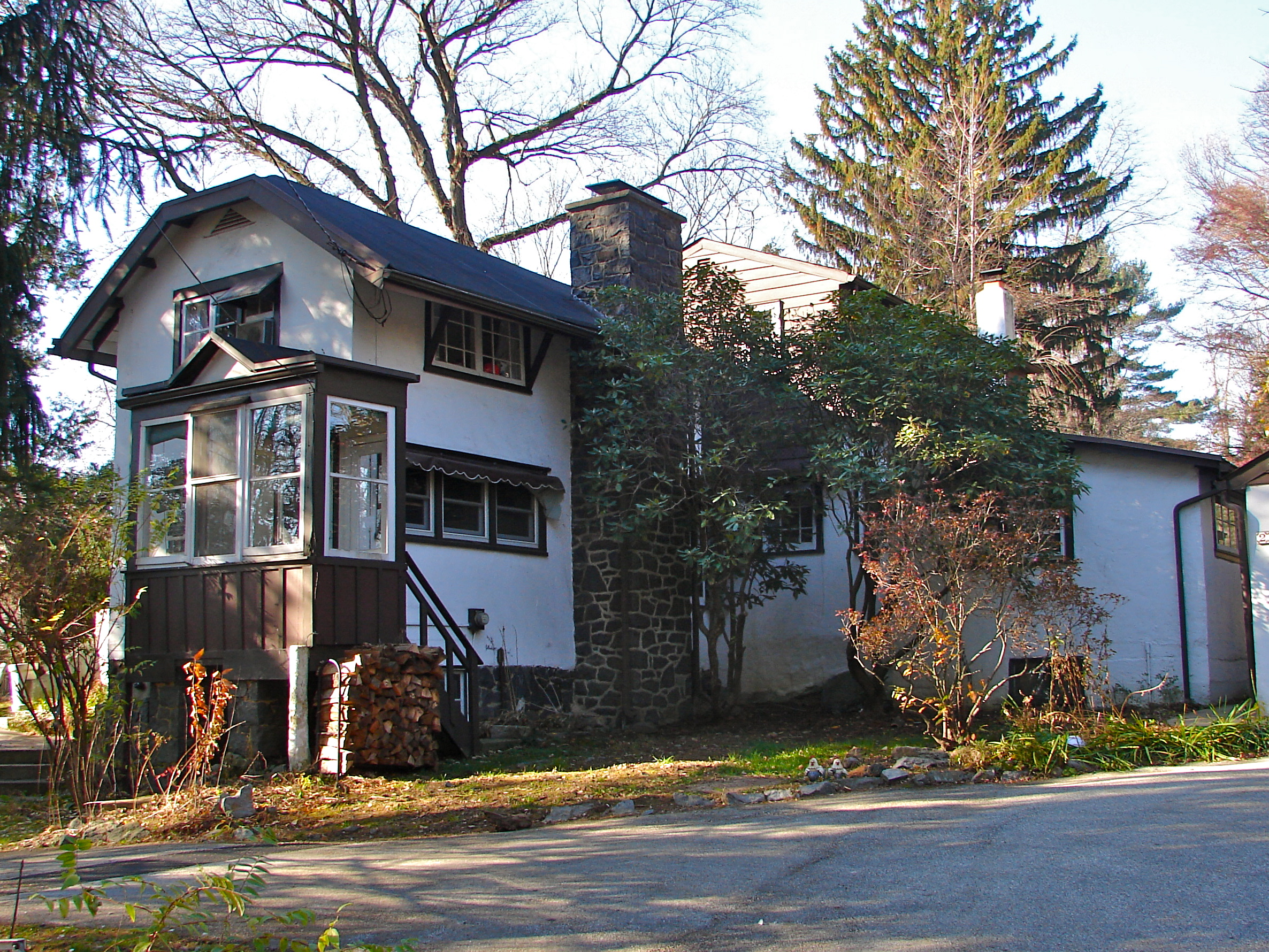
"The Lodge"

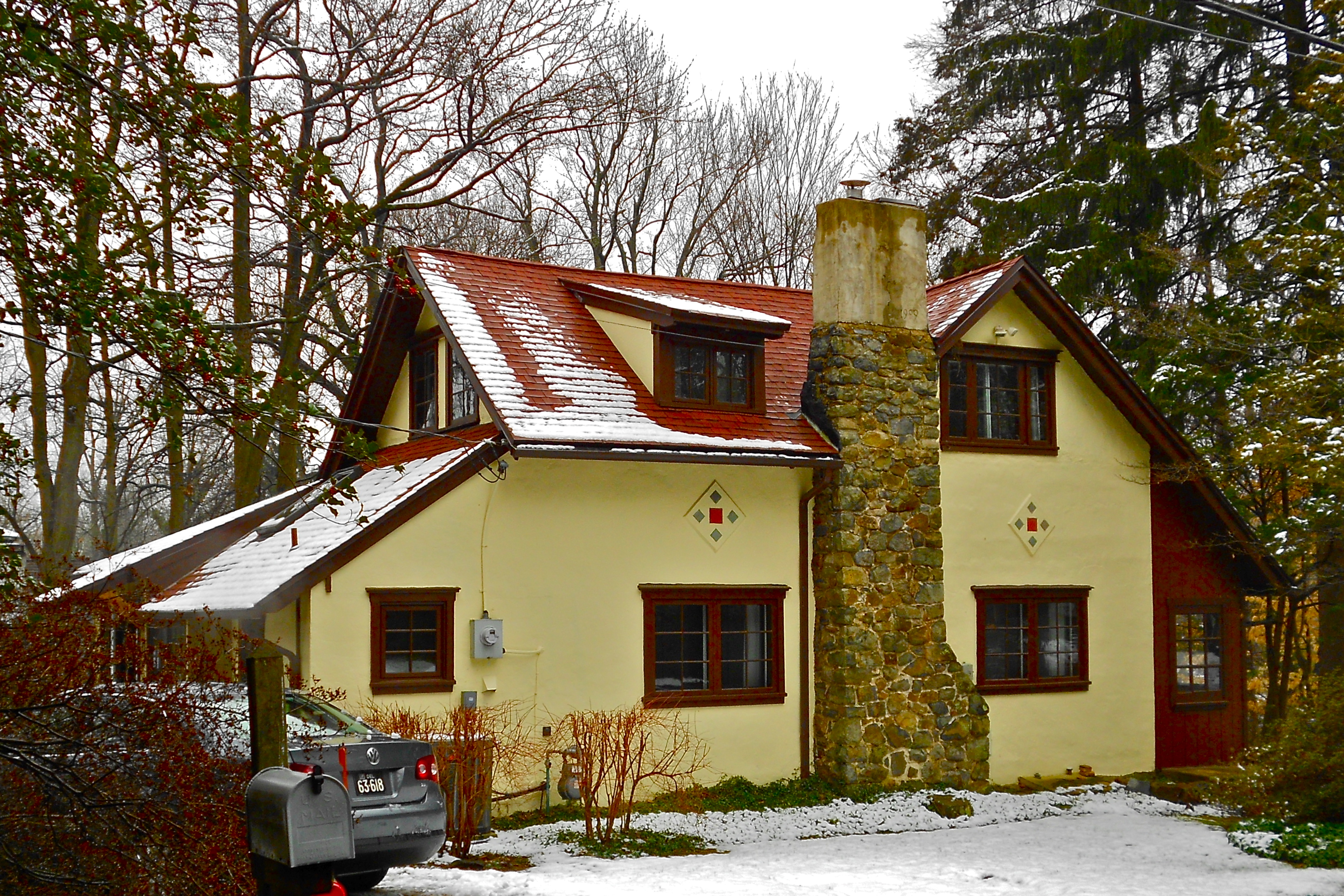
"Green Gate"

Shakespeare's plays were produced early in Arden's history to promote better oratory skills among the Georgists and have continued if only as a tradition and form of entertainment.

It took longer to implement the Arts-and-Crafts ideal because the community was so small at first. Many people worked in Wilmington or Philadelphia. In 1913, the Craft Shop was built, which provided facilities for various artisans. Arden crafts, especially from the Arden Forge and Arden Weavers, became popular in the area.

The conceptual lifestyle of Arden proved so popular that it expanded twice, with Ardentown in 1922 and Ardencroft in 1950. Today, the Ardens remain as single-tax communities at the village municipal level. The spirit of Arden encourages all sorts of artistic and intellectual expression and a strong community life. Most of the village activities and Club activities are run by volunteers.

Arden, Delaware and its sister villages, Ardentown and Ardencroft, are in the National Historic Register because of their cultural landscape, rather than its land or buildings. Still, there are several buildings associated with Stephens and Price, including old farm houses and converted barns, the Craftshop, the Weaveshop, and a number of fine Craftsman Houses, that have historical and architectural interest.

== Architecture ==
- Village of Arden
- U.S. National Register of Historic Places
- U.S. Historic district
- Area: 163 acres (66 ha)
- Built: 1900
- Architect: William Lightfoot Price, Frank Stephens
- Architectural style: Tudor Revival, Elizabethan
- NRHP reference No.: 73000550
- Added to NRHP: February 6, 1973

- Ardens Historic District
- U.S. National Register of Historic Places
- U.S. Historic district
- Location within Delaware Location within the United States
- Area: 380 acres (150 ha)
- Built: 1900
- Architect: William L. Price, Frank Stephens
- Architectural style: late 19th and early 20th century American Movements, barn
- NRHP reference No.: 01001245
- Added to NRHP: May 30, 2003

There are six named houses in Arden designed by William Lightfoot Price: Friendly Gables (built 1909), 2205 Little Lane; The Lodge (1910), 2209 The Sweep; Rest Cottage (1910), 2328 Cherry Lane; Green Gate (1909), 2210 The Sweep; The Second Homestead (1909), 2311 Woodland; and The Fels House (1909), 2110 Orleans Road. Price also designed the Arden Craft Shop in 1913. His designs are generally Elizabethan Revival and show the influence of the Arts and Crafts movement. The first houses built in Arden were small summer cottages that have been destroyed, or in a few cases greatly enlarged. Small worker's cottages were also built after the completion of the Craft Shop. Price may have participated in the designs of both these forms as well. Residents often designed, built and named their own cottages. Upton Sinclair's cottage was built with funds from Joseph Fels and named by other residents "Jungalow."

== Geography ==
According to the United States Census Bureau, the village has a total area of 0.3 square miles (0.78 km^{2}), all land. It is bounded by Sherwood Forest, Marsh Road, Hanby Park, and the expansion villages of Ardentown and Ardencroft.

== Infrastructure ==
=== Transportation ===
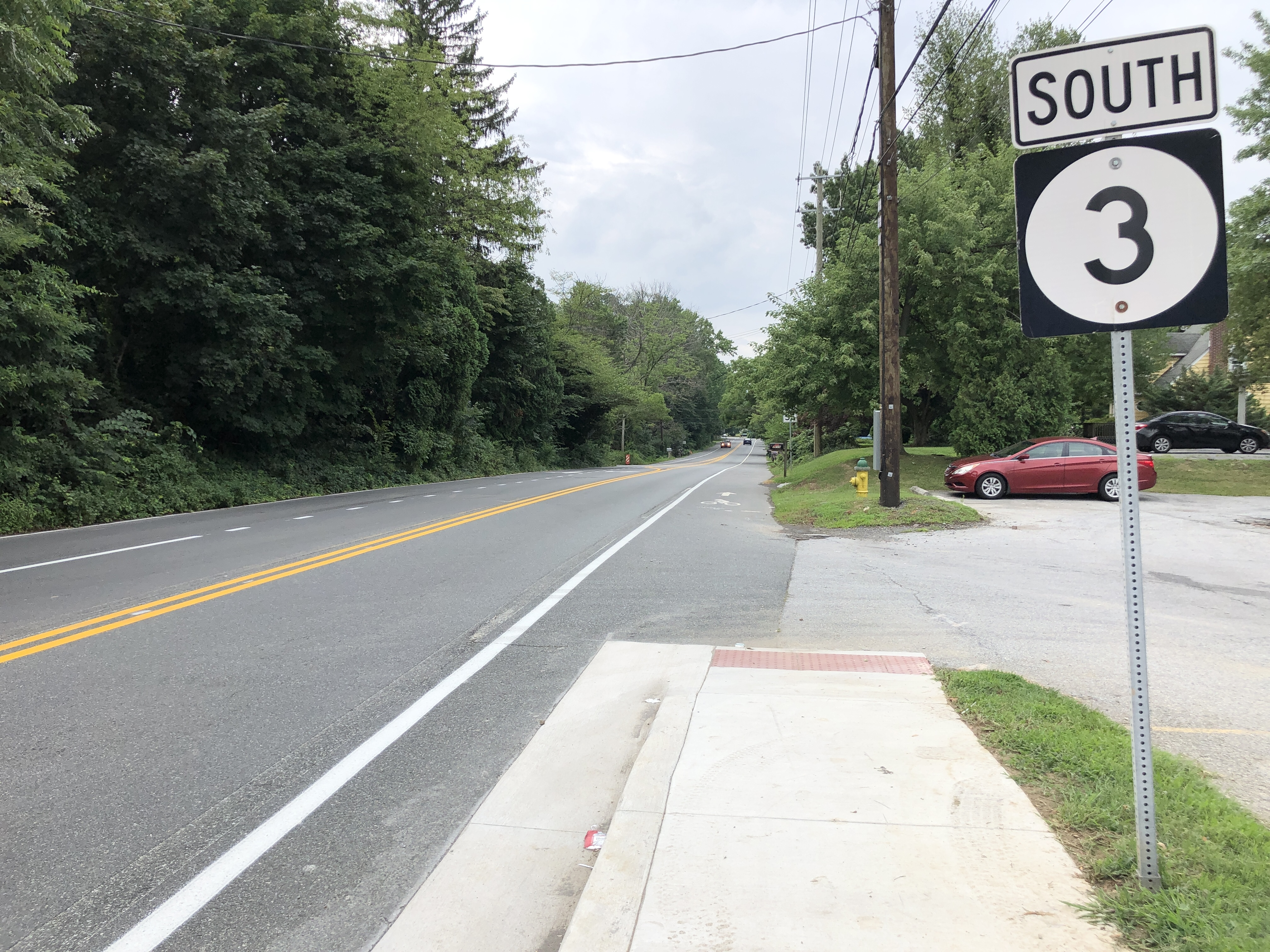
DE 3 southbound in Arden

Delaware Route 3 runs southwest-northeast along the western border of Arden as Marsh Road, heading south toward Wilmington and north toward Delaware Route 92 west of Claymont. Harvey Road runs northwest-southeast through Arden and leads southeast to a partial interchange with Interstate 95, which has access to southbound I-95 toward Wilmington and access from northbound I-95 coming from Wilmington, and to U.S. Route 13 Business southwest of Claymont. DART First State provides bus service to Arden along Route 11, which heads south via DE 3 and Washington Street to the Wilmington station serving Amtrak and SEPTA Regional Rail's Wilmington/Newark Line.

=== Utilities ===
Delmarva Power, a subsidiary of Exelon, provides electricity and natural gas to Arden. Suez Delaware, a subsidiary of Suez North America, provides water to Arden. Sewer service in Arden is provided by New Castle County. Trash and recycling collection in Arden is provided by Trash Tech.

== Education ==
It is in the Brandywine School District. Zoned schools are as follows: Forwood Elementary School, Talley Middle School, and Mount Pleasant High School.

There was formerly an Arden Elementary School. It began having a racially desegregated student body in 1952.

== Notable people ==
- Joe Biden – the 46th president of the United States, lived in Arden during part of his childhood.
- Ella Reeve Bloor – American labor organizer and a founder of the Communist Labor Party of America (1862–1951)
- Harry Kemp – American poet, author, and vagabond (1883–1960) (1883–1960)
- Scott Nearing – American economist, pacifist, and homesteader (1883–1983)
- Russell W. Peterson – American scientist and politician (1916–2011)
- Upton Sinclair – American writer (1878–1968)

== Demographics ==
Historical population
Census	Pop.	Note	%±
1970	555		—
1980	516		−7.0%
1990	477		−7.6%
2000	474		−0.6%
2010	439		−7.4%
2020	430		−2.1%
U.S. Decennial Census

=== 2020 census ===
The 2020 United States census counted 430 people, 220 households, and 113 families in Arden. The population density was 1,726.9 per square mile (666.8/km^{2}). There were 239 housing units at an average density of 959.8 per square mile (370.6/km^{2}). The racial makeup was 88.14% (379) white or European American (87.67% non-Hispanic white), 2.56% (11) black or African-American, 0.0% (0) Native American or Alaska Native, 0.7% (3) Asian, 0.0% (0) Pacific Islander or Native Hawaiian, 1.63% (7) from other races, and 6.98% (30) from two or more races. Hispanic or Latino of any race was 4.42% (19) of the population.

Of the 220 households, 23.2% had children under the age of 18; 35.0% were married couples living together; 36.4% had a female householder with no spouse or partner present. 36.8% of households consisted of individuals and 20.5% had someone living alone who was 65 years of age or older. The average household size was 2.3 and the average family size was 2.8. The percent of those with a bachelor’s degree or higher was estimated to be 38.8% of the population.

9.5% of the population was under the age of 18, 8.8% from 18 to 24, 14.9% from 25 to 44, 30.7% from 45 to 64, and 36.0% who were 65 years of age or older. The median age was 60.3 years. For every 100 females, there were 121.6 males. For every 100 females ages 18 and older, there were 123.6 males.

The 2016–2020 5-year American Community Survey estimates show that the median household income was $78,125 (with a margin of error of +/- $50,729). The median family income was $137,292 (+/- $125,369). Males had a median income of $32,305 (+/- $20,785). The median income for those above 16 years old was $28,125 (+/- $6,079). Approximately, 3.9% of families and 2.4% of the population were below the poverty line, including 0.0% of those under the age of 18 and 0.0% of those ages 65 or over.

=== 2000 census ===
As of the census of 2000, there were 474 people, 229 households, and 122 families residing in the village. The population density was 1,780.5 inhabitants per square mile (687.5/km^{2}). There were 243 housing units at an average density of 912.8 per square mile (352.4/km^{2}). The racial makeup of the village was 95.15% White, 0.84% African American, 0.42% Native American, 1.69% Asian, and 1.90% from two or more races. Hispanic or Latino of any race were 2.32% of the population.

There were 229 households, out of which 21.4% had children under the age of 18 living with them, 38.9% were married couples living together, 11.4% had a female householder with no husband present, and 46.3% were non-families. 38.4% of all households were made up of individuals, and 10.0% had someone living alone who was 65 years of age or older. The average household size was 2.07 and the average family size was 2.80.

In the village, the population was spread out, with 18.1% under the age of 18, 3.2% from 18 to 24, 24.1% from 25 to 44, 35.9% from 45 to 64, and 18.8% who were 65 years of age or older. The median age was 46 years. For every 100 females, there were 95.9 males. For every 100 females age 18 and over, there were 89.3 males.

The median income for a household in the village was $56,731, and the median income for a family was $70,893. Males had a median income of $48,125 versus $38,333 for females. The per capita income for the village was $30,422. None of the families and 2.1% of the population were living below the poverty line, including no under eighteens and 2.0% of those over 64.

== See also ==
- National Register of Historic Places listings in northern New Castle County, Delaware
- Fairhope, Alabama
- Rose Valley, Pennsylvania – Borough in Pennsylvania, US
