= Brandywine School District =

School district in Delaware, United States

Location
- 1311 Brandywine Boulevard Wilmington, DE 19809 United States

District information
- Grades: PreK-12
- Superintendent: Dr. Lisa Lawson
- Schools: 16
- NCES District ID: 1001240

Students and staff
- Students: 10,500
- Teachers: 919
- Staff: 622

Other information
- Website: brandywineschools.org

Brandywine School District (abbreviated BSD) is a public school district in northern New Castle County, Delaware in the United States.

It serves Arden, Ardencroft, Ardentown, Bellefonte, Claymont, Edgemoor, Talleyville, and a northeast portion of the city of Wilmington. It also includes Brandywine Hundred. The size of its territory is 33 square miles (85 km^{2}).

Its administrative offices are in an unincorporated area, and has a Wilmington postal address.

The district also offers a program known as the gifted and talented program. The program is for children with a higher understanding of grade level assignments. There are three schools participating in this program: Mount Pleasant Elementary School, Claymont Elementary School, and P.S. duPont Middle School. Mount Pleasant High School and Talley Middle School offer the International Baccalaureate program for students who test into the program.

== History ==
Established in 1981, it took a portion of the former New Castle County School District.

In 2000 the school board bought out the contract of superintendent Joseph P. DeJohn so that he would leave, and the board had plans to choose a new superintendent. That year Al Mascitti, a columnist for The News Journal, stated that the school board "started treating the district like a foul-smelling refrigerator".

== Administration ==
The current superintendent is Dr. Lisa Lawson. The current board of education president is Ralph Ackerman, and the current vice president is Dr. Shawn Jegede.

== Demographic ==
In the 2019–2020 school year, the district enrolled 10,500 students and employed 919 teachers for a student-to-teacher ratio of about 11.43:1. Between 2012 and 2016 it was recorded that the students 66% Caucasian, 22% African-American, 5% Asian, and 4% Hispanic or Latino. Within the district during this time 12.5% of families have an income below the poverty level, and 21.9% receive Food Stamp/SNAP benefits.

== Partnership ==
The school district partnered with the University of Delaware program TeenSHARP to help prepare selected students in the district for top colleges, where students engage in up to two college-level course each school year, for up to 4 years.

== Schools ==
High schools (grades 9–12)

- Brandywine High School
- Concord High School
- Mount Pleasant High School

Middle schools (grades 6–8)

- P.S. duPont Middle School
- Springer Middle School
- Talley Middle School

Elementary schools (grades K–5)

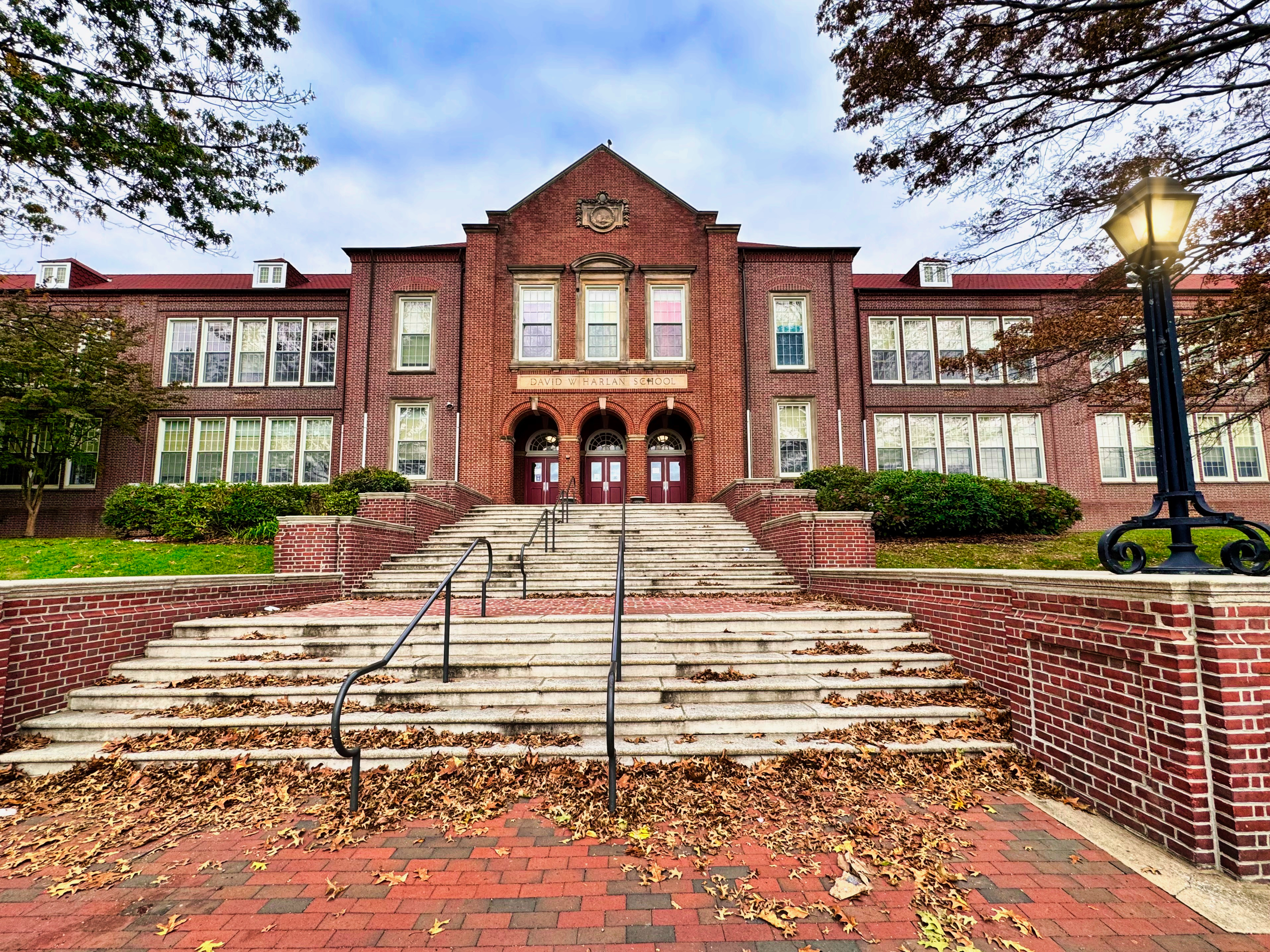
David W. Harlan Elementary School

- Carrcroft Elementary School
- Claymont Elementary School
- Forwood Elementary School
- Hanby Elementary School
- Harlan Elementary School
- Lancashire Elementary School
- Lombardy Elementary School
- Maple Lane Elementary School
- Mount Pleasant Elementary School

Preschool programs (PreK)

- Charles W. Bush Early Education Center
- Joseph Brumskill Early Childhood Assistance Program (ECAP)

== Notable events ==
In 2006, a Claymont Elementary school teacher was arrested for first-degree rape, and providing alcohol to a minor, after it was discovered that she had sex with a 13-year-old male student twenty-eight times. She also allowed for the child's 12-year-old friend to watch them and provided them with alcohol. She pled guilty to a single count of second-degree rape and received a mandatory minimum 10-year sentence.

A federal lawsuit was levied against the district in 2016, as a mis-identification and subsequent search discovered weapons in a students bag, caused a 5-day out of school suspension. After the mis-identification was discovered the father raised the suit of potential Fourth Amendment violations, when he discovered the suspension would stay on his sons record. The lawsuit led, to students and their personal property cannot be searched without a parent or guardian present.

In 2018, a blue school bus was unveiled to help feed students during the summer when school is out of session, and funded through the USDA's Summer Food Service Program. District Supervisor of School Nutrition Pam Gouge, highlighted the need for the bus as nearly half of the districts students qualify for a free or reduced lunch, and the Food Bank had pulled out of areas. That year also saw the district participating in the National School Walkout, organized by the survivors of Marjory Stoneman Douglas High School shooting.

In 2019 it was announced that a middle schooler from the district was invited to sit with Melania Trump for the 2019 State of the Union address, after reports that he was bullied as he shares the same last name as President Donald Trump.

In November 2022, Two 8th graders were taken to hospital after ingesting marijuana gummies at Springer Middle School.
