= Carpenter, Delaware =

Unincorporated community in Delaware, United States

- Unincorporated community
- Location within Delaware Location within the United States
- Coordinates: 39°49′06″N 75°27′52″W
- Country: United States
- State: Delaware
- County: New Castle
- Elevation: 151 ft (46 m)
- Time zone: UTC-5 (Eastern (EST))
  - Summer (DST): UTC-4 (EDT)
- Area code: 302
- GNIS feature ID: 213760

Carpenter is an unincorporated community in New Castle County, Delaware, United States. Carpenter is located where Delaware Route 92 crosses the former Baltimore & Ohio Railroad (now CSX Transportation's Philadelphia Subdivision), 6.5 miles northeast of Wilmington.

== History ==
Carpenter's population was 18 in 1900, 52 in 1925, and 100 in 1960.
