= Hanbys Corner, Delaware =

Unincorporated community in Delaware, United States

- Unincorporated community
- Location within Delaware Location within the United States
- Coordinates: 39°49′21″N 75°29′14″W
- Country: United States
- State: Delaware
- County: New Castle
- Elevation: 308 ft (94 m)
- Time zone: UTC-5 (Eastern (EST))
  - Summer (DST): UTC-4 (EDT)
- Area code: 302
- GNIS feature ID: 214051

Hanbys Corner is an unincorporated community in New Castle County, Delaware, United States. It is located at the intersection of Delaware Route 3 (Marsh Road) and Delaware Route 92 (Naamans Road), in Brandywine Hundred. The area is named for Richard G. Hanby, who first purchased the 125-acre (0.51 km^{2}) parcel from the descendants of William Penn in 1753. His descendants included several notable figures in the local political scene including Samuel Winfield Hanby (1817–1892) who was elected as a State Representative in 1874, Jacob Klose Hanby (1839–1932) who was Samuel's son and was elected State Representative in 1904, Robert Johnson Hanby (1834–1898), who served in the 124th PA infantry during the Civil War and was elected State Senator in 1896, and Florence Wood Hanby (1870–1963), who was Robert's daughter-in-law and was the first woman elected to the Delaware House of Representatives in 1924. In addition Wayne Hanby and James Hanby have both served as Justices of the Peace for New Castle County. The last Hanby to occupy the property, Albert T. Hanby (1881–1947), another son of Samuel, attended West Chester State College before getting his law degree from Penn Law School. Albert became a Philadelphia lawyer and left his farm at Hanby's Corner to be used for the good of "all the children in Delaware". He and his wife created a foundation in 1945 to protect the property from further development. Today the YMCA operates their Hanby Camp there, and the trust provide scholarships for kids who might not otherwise be able to attend. In 2007 that support was over $70,000.
