= Ardentown, Delaware =

- Village
- Location of Ardentown in New Castle County, Delaware.

- Location within the state of Delaware Ardentown (the United States) Ardentown (North America)
- Coordinates: 39°48′30″N 75°28′59″W
- Country: United States
- State: Delaware
- County: New Castle
- Established: 1922

Area
  - Total: 0.24 sq mi (0.61 km^{2})
  - Land: 0.24 sq mi (0.61 km^{2})
  - Water: 0 sq mi (0.00 km^{2})
- Elevation: 233 ft (71 m)

Population (2020)
  - Total: 255
  - Density: 1,089.5/sq mi (420.66/km^{2})
- Time zone: UTC-5 (Eastern (EST))
  - Summer (DST): UTC-4 (EDT)
- Area code: 302
- FIPS code: 10-01660
- GNIS feature ID: 216842
- Website: ardentown.delaware.gov

Ardentown is a village in New Castle County, Delaware, United States. As of the 2020 census, Ardentown had a population of 255.

Ardentown was founded by Donald Stephens in 1922 as an outgrowth of Arden with a conceptual lifestyle based on Henry George's Single tax movement and William Morris’s Arts and Crafts principles. "Don" Stephens is the son of Arden's founder Frank Stephens.

== Geography ==
Ardentown is located at 39°48′30″N 75°28′59″W (39.8084460, –75.4829752).

According to the United States Census Bureau, the village has a total area of 0.2 square miles (0.52 km^{2}), all land.

== Infrastructure ==
=== Transportation ===
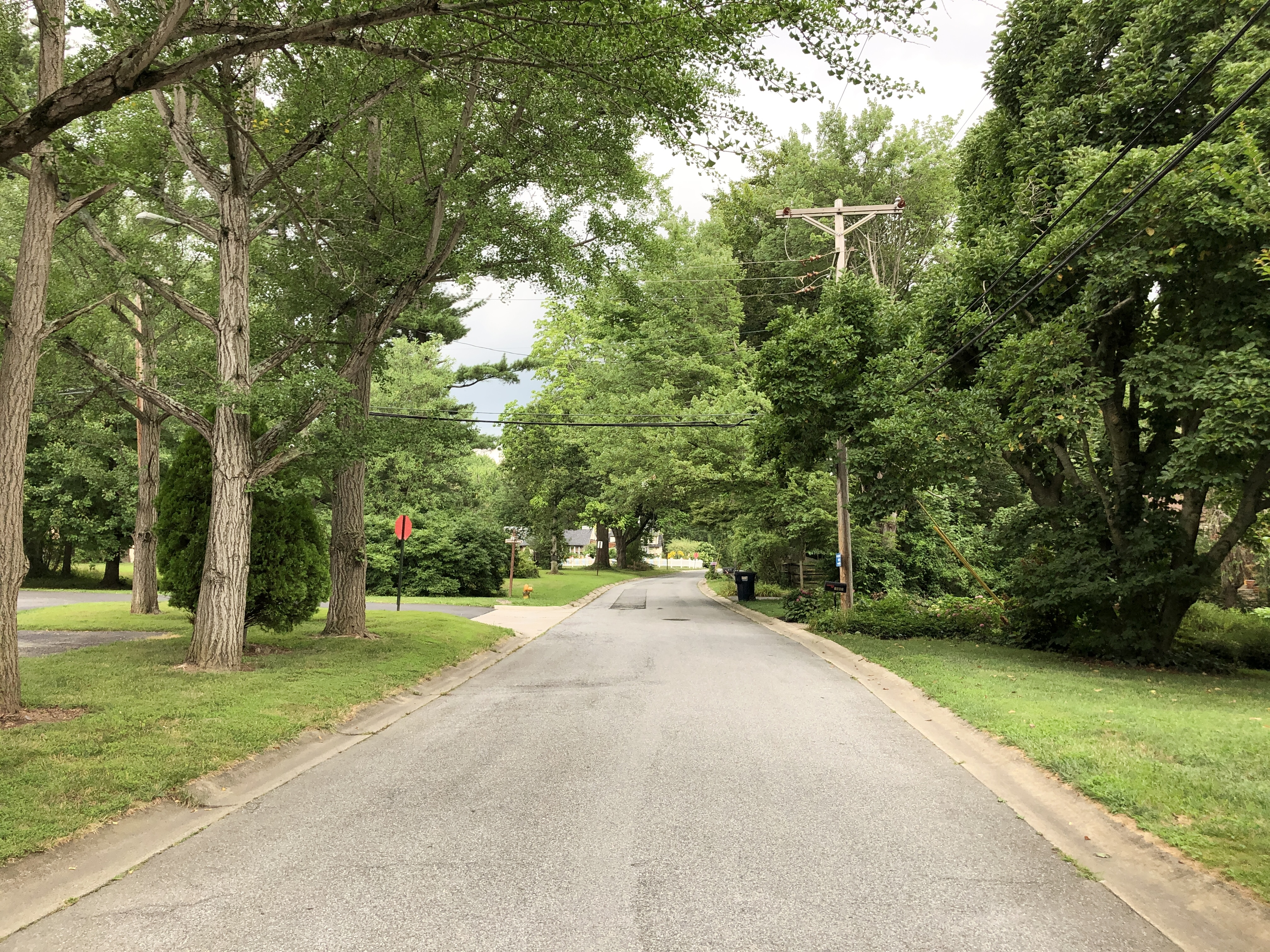
Millers Road through Ardentown, a typical street

No state highways directly serve Ardentown. Delaware Route 3 runs southwest–northeast to the west of Ardentown as Marsh Road, heading south toward Wilmington and north toward Delaware Route 92 west of Claymont. Harvey Road runs northwest–southeast along the southwestern border of Ardentown and leads southeast to a partial interchange with Interstate 95, which has access to southbound I-95 toward Wilmington and access from northbound I-95 coming from Wilmington, and to U.S. Route 13 Business, southwest of Claymont. DART First State provides bus service to Ardentown along Route 11, which heads south via DE 3 and Washington Street to the Wilmington station serving Amtrak and SEPTA Regional Rail's Wilmington/Newark Line.

=== Utilities ===
Delmarva Power, a subsidiary of Exelon, provides electricity and natural gas to Ardentown. Suez Delaware, a subsidiary of Suez North America, provides water to Ardentown. Sewer service in Ardentown is provided by New Castle County. Trash and recycling collection in Ardentown is provided by Waste Management.

== Education ==
It is in the Brandywine School District.

Zoned schools are as follows: Most parts are zoned to Forwood Elementary School, Talley Middle School, and Mount Pleasant High School. An exclave is zoned to the same middle school, but is divided between Lancashire and Forwood elementaries, and between Mount Pleasant and Concord high schools.

Previously Ardentown was in the Mount Pleasant School District.

== Demographics ==
Historical population
Census	Pop.	Note	%±
1980	307		—
1990	325		5.9%
2000	300		−7.7%
2010	264		−12.0%
2020	255		−3.4%
U.S. Decennial Census

At the 2000 census there were 300 people, 136 households, and 82 families living in the village. The population density was 1,312.8 inhabitants per square mile (506.9/km^{2}). There were 141 housing units at an average density of 617.0 per square mile (238.2/km^{2}). The racial makeup of the village was 93.67% White, 1.00% African American, 4.33% Asian, and 1.00% from two or more races. Hispanic or Latino of any race were 0.33%.

Of the 136 households 20.6% had children under the age of 18 living with them, 48.5% were married couples living together, 9.6% had a female householder with no husband present, and 39.0% were non-families. 30.9% of households were one person and 8.1% were one person aged 65 or older. The average household size was 2.08 and the average family size was 2.57.

The age distribution was 15.0% under the age of 18, 2.3% from 18 to 24, 25.3% from 25 to 44, 34.3% from 45 to 64, and 23.0% 65 or older. The median age was 48 years. For every 100 females, there were 80.7 males. For every 100 females age 18 and over, there were 73.5 males.

The median household income was $64,286 and the median family income was $72,500. Males had a median income of $63,125 versus $31,875 for females. The per capita income for the village was $35,577. About 1.3% of families and 2.5% of the population were below the poverty line, including none of those under the age of eighteen and 6.0% of those sixty five or over.
