= Delaware Route 3 =

State highway in New Castle County, Delaware, United States

Delaware Route 3

Route information
- Maintained by DelDOT
- Length: 6.15 mi (9.90 km)
- Existed: 1968–present

Major junctions
- South end: I-495 / US 13 / Lighthouse Road / Hay Road in Edgemoor
- US 13 Bus. near Bellefonte; I-95 near Bellefonte
- North end: DE 92 in Hanbys Corner

Location
- Country: United States
- State: Delaware
- Counties: New Castle

Highway system
- Delaware State Route System; List; Byways
← DE 2	→ DE 4

Delaware Route 3 (DE 3) is a state highway northeast of the city of Wilmington in New Castle County, Delaware. The route runs from Lighthouse Road/Hay Road just south of Interstate 495 (I-495) in Edgemoor north to DE 92 in Hanbys Corner. The route passes through the suburban areas of Brandywine Hundred, Bellefonte, and Arden. It intersects I-495 and U.S. Route 13 (US 13) in Edgemoor, US 13 Business (US 13 Bus.) in Bellefonte, and I-95 near Bellevue State Park. DE 3 was built as a state highway during the 1920s and 1930s. By 1968, the route was designated between US 13 (now US 13 Bus.) north to DE 92 on Marsh Road. The route was moved to its current alignment and terminus by 1984.

== Route description ==
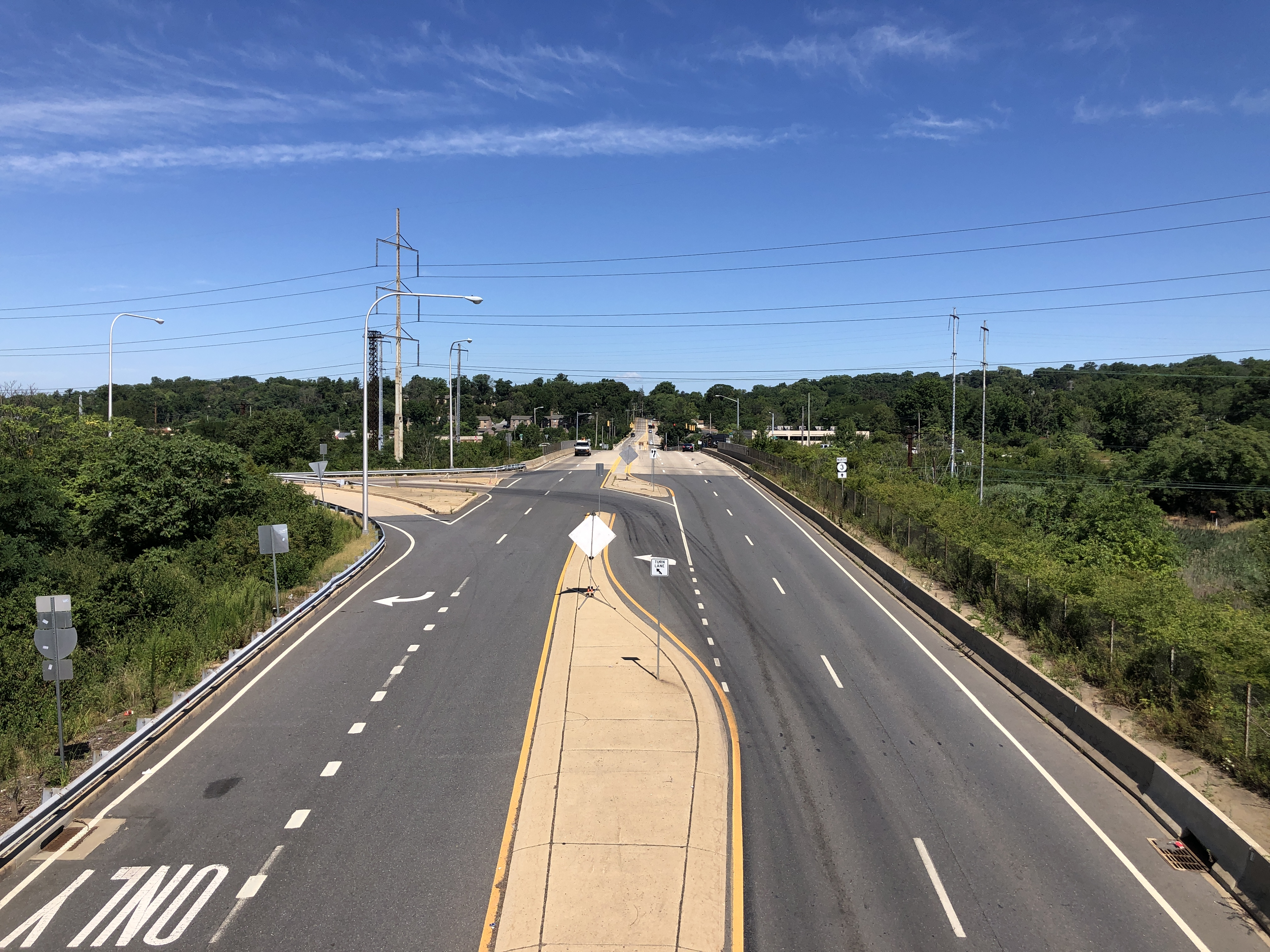
DE 3 northbound at I-495 in Edgemoor

DE 3 begins at an intersection with Lighthouse Road/Hay Road just south of an interchange with I-495 in an industrial section of Edgemoor, heading northwest on four-lane divided Edgemoor Road. After the I-495 interchange, the road passes over Norfolk Southern's Shellpot Secondary and Amtrak's Northeast Corridor railroad lines before it intersects US 13 near businesses. Past this intersection, DE 3 enters a more residential area as a three-lane undivided road with two southbound lanes and one northbound lane. The route narrows to two lanes and turns west and north, coming to an intersection with US 13 Bus. At this point, Shipley Road heads north and DE 3 turns northeast to form a concurrency with US 13 Bus. on four-lane undivided Philadelphia Pike, running through residential and commercial areas. DE 3 splits from US 13 Bus. at the northwest edge of the town of Bellefonte by turning northwest onto Washington Street Extension, a four-lane divided highway. The route passes to the southwest of Mount Pleasant High School and turns north onto Marsh Road, a four-lane undivided road that forms the western boundary of Bellevue State Park. The road becomes a divided highway as it crosses Carr Road and comes to a diamond interchange with I-95, with the ramps to and from northbound I-95 connecting to Carr Road.

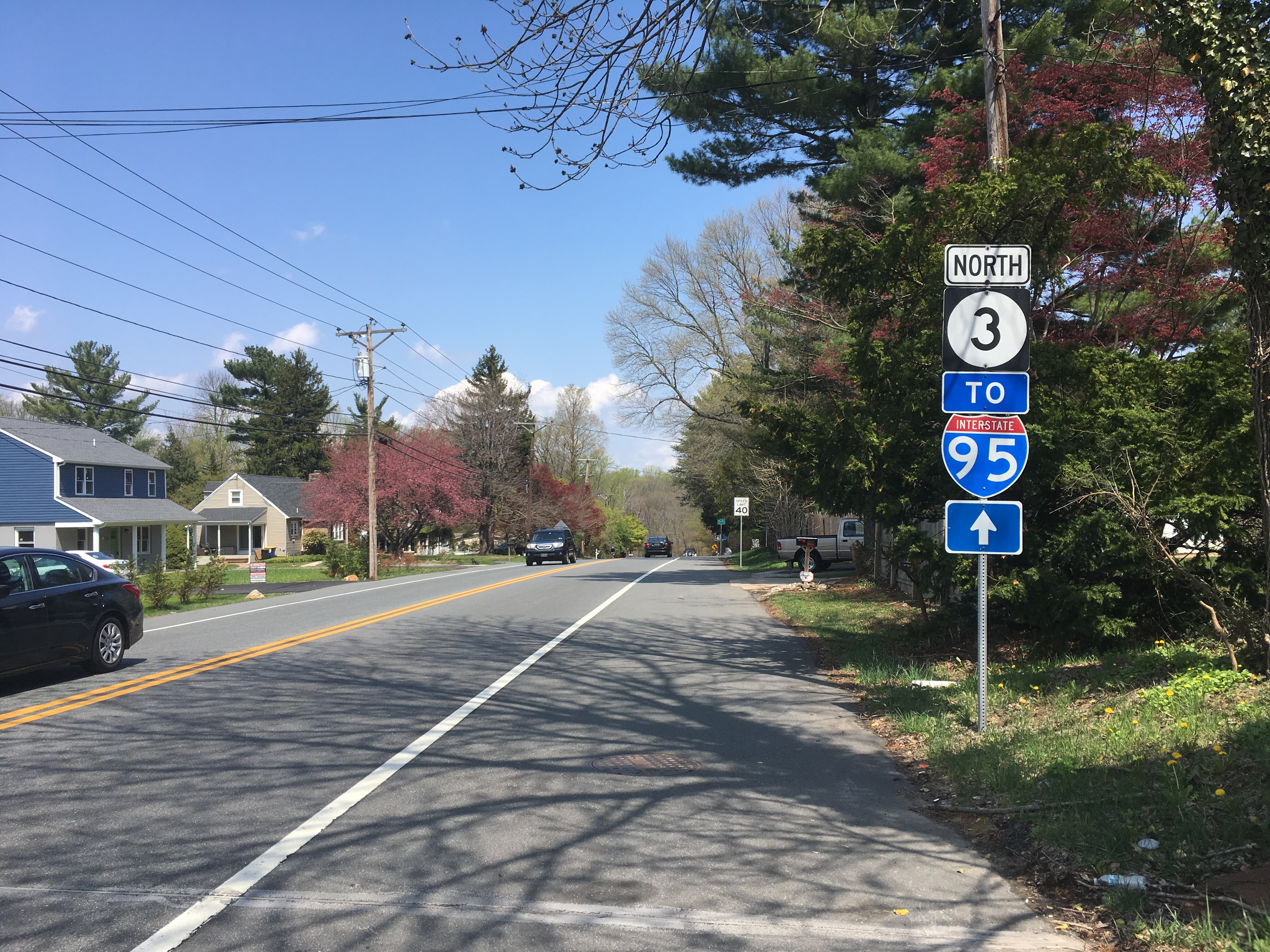
DE 3 northbound in Arden

Immediately after this interchange, DE 3 crosses under CSX's Philadelphia Subdivision railroad line and narrows into a two-lane undivided road that heads through suburban areas in Brandywine Hundred, running through residential neighborhoods and past a few businesses. The route gains a center left-turn lane between Wilson Road/Veale Road and Silverside Road. The road curves northeast and forms the western border of the village of Arden. DE 3 turns north again past the Grubb Road/Harvey Road intersection and leaves Arden as it runs between neighborhoods to the west and woodland to the east, ending at an intersection with DE 92 in Hanbys Corner. Marsh Road continues north past this intersection as an unnumbered road toward the Pennsylvania state line.

DE 3 has an annual average daily traffic count ranging from a high of 13,642 vehicles at the I-95 interchange to a low of 4,708 vehicles on Washington Street Extension.

== History ==
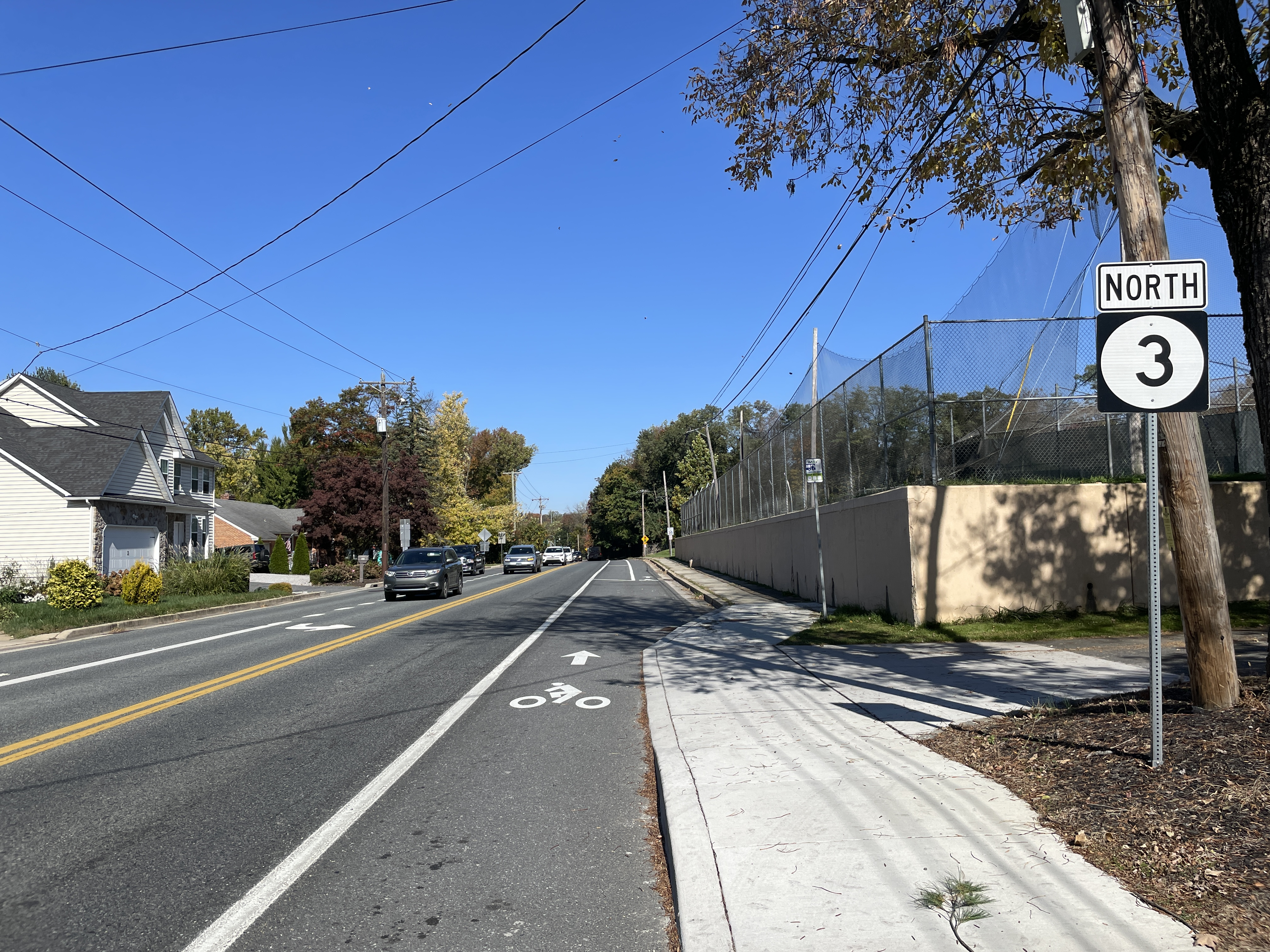
DE 3 northbound past Washington Street Extension near Wilmington

What is now DE 3 existed as a county road by 1920. Four years later, the road was upgraded to a state highway between Philadelphia Pike and Harvey Road. The state highway was extended north to Naamans Road by 1931. By 1968, DE 3 was designated to run from US 13 (now US 13 Bus.) north to DE 92 along Marsh Road. DE 4 was extended onto the Washington Street Extension portion of present-day DE 3 three years later. DE 4 was removed from Washington Street Extension by 1981. Three years later, DE 3 was extended to I-495 in Edgemoor. At this time, DE 3 was realigned to follow Washington Street Extension from Marsh Road to a concurrency with US 13 Bus., heading southwest along that route before heading southeast along Edgemoor Road.

== Major intersections ==
The entire route is in New Castle County.

Location	mi	km	Destinations	Notes
Edgemoor	0.00	0.00	Lighthouse Road / Hay Road – Edgemoor Industrial Park	Southern terminus
Edgemoor			I-495	Exits 4B-A on I-495
Edgemoor	0.23	0.37	US 13 (Governor Printz Boulevard)	
	1.22	1.96	US 13 Bus. south (Philadelphia Pike)	Southern end of US 13 Bus. concurrency
	2.01	3.23	US 13 Bus. north (Philadelphia Pike)	Northern end of US 13 Bus. concurrency
	2.83	4.55	I-95 – Wilmington, Philadelphia	Exit 9 on I-95
Hanbys Corner	6.15	9.90	DE 92 (Naamans Road) to I-95	Northern terminus
1.000 mi = 1.609 km; 1.000 km = 0.621 mi: Concurrency terminus
