= Delaware Route 92 =

State highway in New Castle County, Delaware, United States

Delaware Route 92

Route information
- Maintained by DelDOT
- Length: 8.83 mi (14.21 km)
- Existed: 1968–present

Major junctions
- West end: DE 100 near Montchanin
- US 202 in Brandywine; DE 261 in Ways Corner; DE 3 in Hanbys Corner; I-95 in Claymont; DE 491 in Claymont
- East end: US 13 in Claymont

Location
- Country: United States
- State: Delaware
- Counties: New Castle

Highway system
- Delaware State Route System; List; Byways
← DE 82	→ I-95

Delaware Route 92 (DE 92) is a 8.83-mile-long (14.21 km) road in northern New Castle County, Delaware, that runs a short distance to the south of the Pennsylvania/Delaware state line for most of its length. The route runs from DE 100 near Montchanin east to U.S. Route 13 (US 13) in Claymont. The road is a two-lane rural road between the western terminus and US 202, passing through Brandywine Creek State Park and the Brandywine Valley section of First State National Historical Park. East of US 202, DE 92 is a four-lane divided highway called Naamans Road that passes through suburban areas to the north of Wilmington, with an interchange at Interstate 95 (I-95) in Claymont. DE 92 was first built as a state highway east of US 202 during the 1920s and 1930s. By 1968, the route was designated onto its current alignment. In the 1990s, DE 92 east of US 202 was widened into a divided highway.

== Route description ==
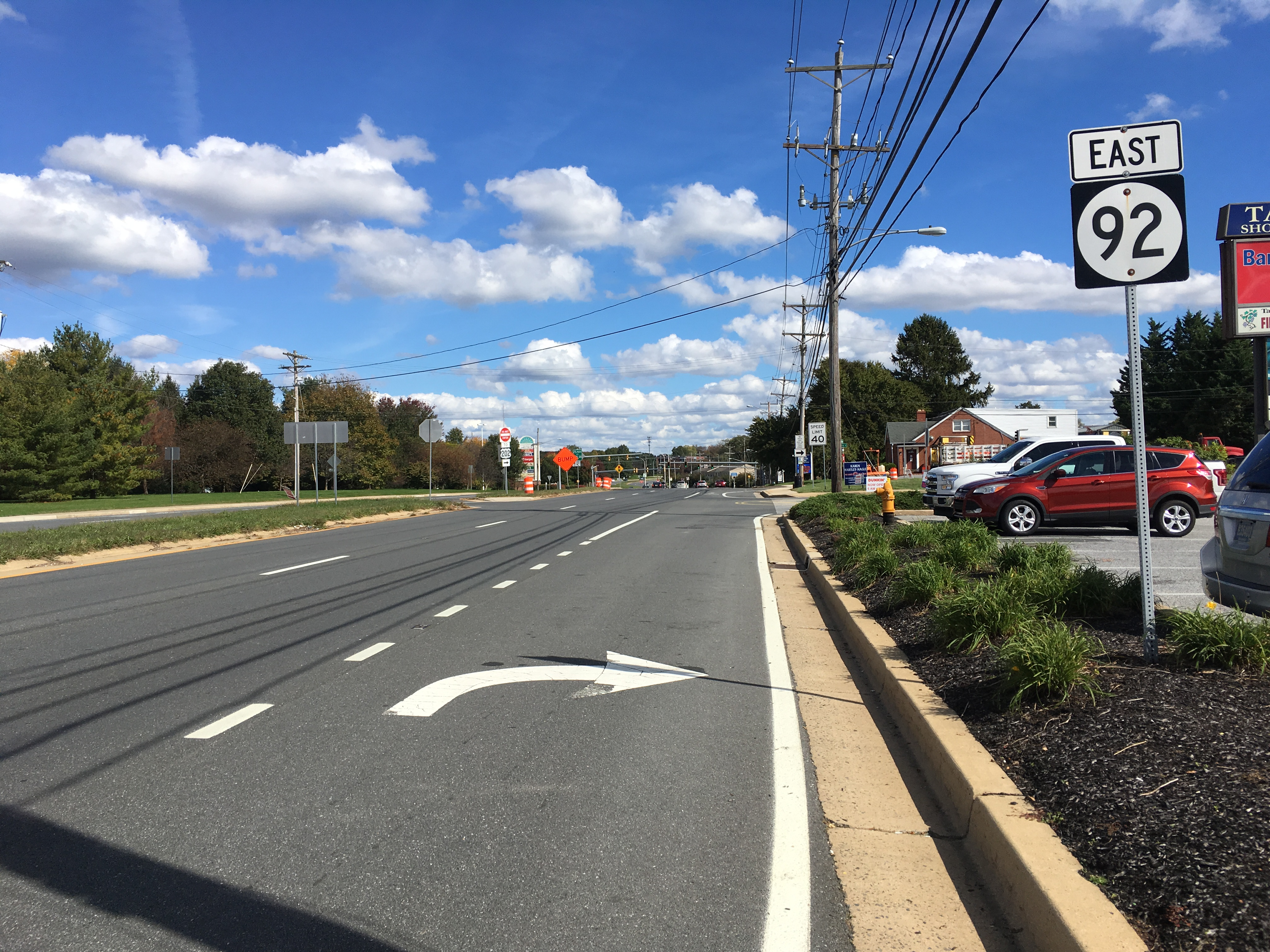
DE 92 eastbound past US 202 north of Wilmington

DE 92 begins at the intersection with DE 100 and Adams Dam Road near Montchanin. The route runs northeast on two-lane undivided Thompson Bridge Road, crossing Wilson Run and passing through farmland to the north of Brandywine Creek State Park. The road continues into forested areas of the state park, crossing the Brandywine Creek. After the state park, DE 92 heads into areas of fields and woods within the Brandywine Valley section of First State National Historical Park. The state route leaves the park and continues northeast along Ramsey Road before curving to the north, passing near farmland. The route turns east onto Beaver Valley Road, widening into a four-lane divided highway as it passes south of business parks and north of the Brandywine Campus of Wilmington University before it intersects US 202 in Brandywine.

Past the US 202 intersection, DE 92 becomes Naamans Road and passes to the south of the Brandywine Town Center shopping center, where a park and ride lot is located, as it continues into residential and commercial areas and intersects Shipley Road. Past the Brandywine Town Center, the route heads through neighborhoods in Brandywine Hundred and has a junction with Grubb Road before it runs to the south of Concord High School and intersects Ebright Road, which goes north to Ebright Azimuth (the highest point in Delaware) and into Pennsylvania. After this, the road comes to an intersection with DE 261 in Ways Corner.

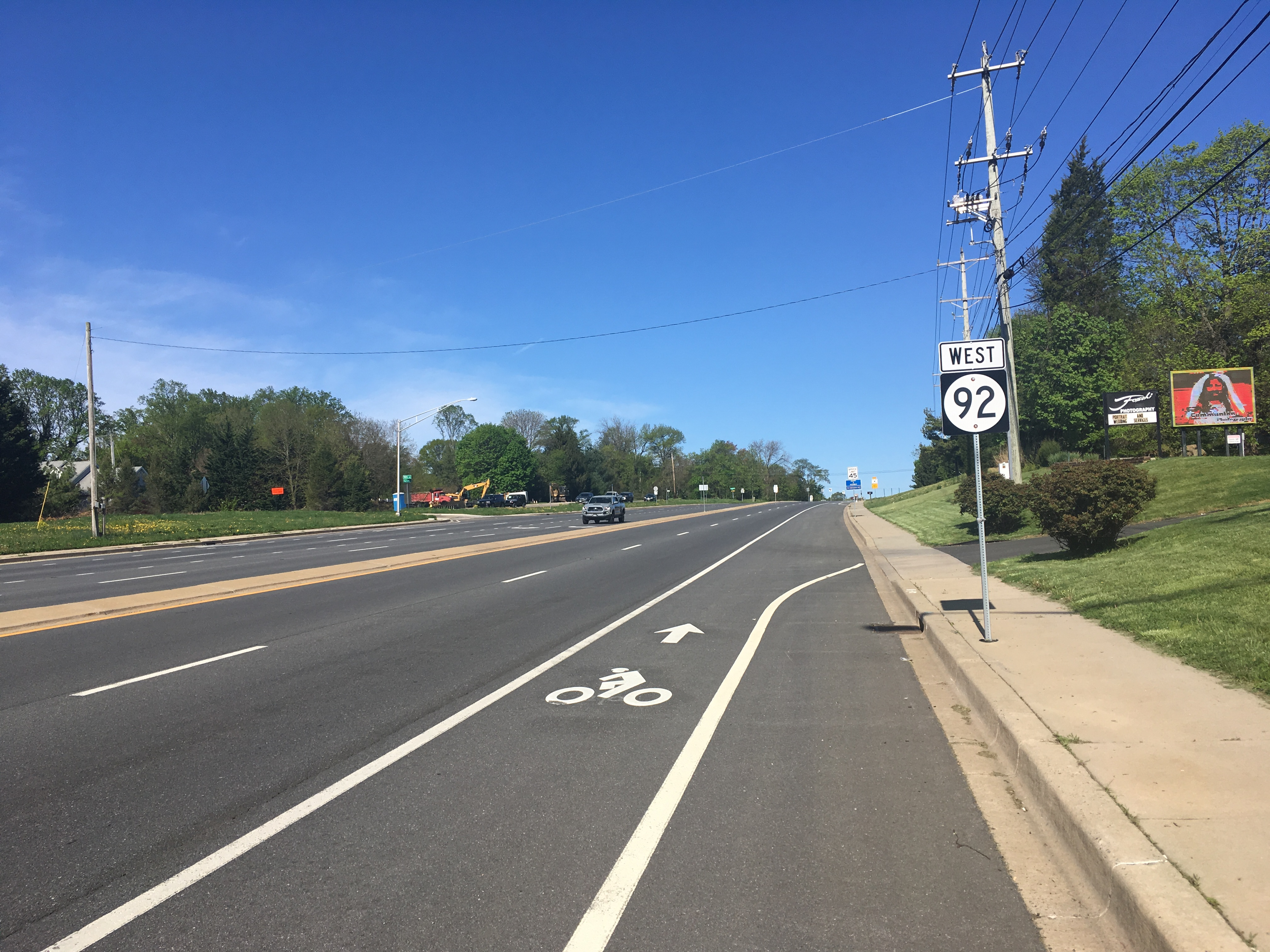
DE 92 westbound past DE 261 north of Wilmington

Farther east, DE 92 reaches a junction with the northern terminus of DE 3 in Hanbys Corner. Past the Darley Road intersection, the route passes north of a church that is home to a park and ride lot. From here, the road intersects Carpenter Station Road in Carpenter, where there is a park and ride lot on the southeast corner, before it crosses over CSX's Philadelphia Subdivision railroad line on a bridge and turns to the east-southeast. The route heads into business areas in Claymont and comes to a diamond interchange with I-95 at the northern terminus of I-495; the southbound exit at this interchange is from I-495 while the other ramps connect directly with I-95. After the I-95 interchange, DE 92 passes to the south of the former Tri-State Mall and crosses Naamans Creek before it has a westbound right-in/right-out intersection with the southern terminus of DE 491. Past this intersection, the route turns southeast and has a junction with Ridge Road before ending at US 13 south of the Robinson House.

DE 92 has an annual average daily traffic count ranging from a high of 30,848 vehicles at the Harvey Road intersection to a low of 6,643 vehicles at the Creek Road intersection. The portion of DE 92 east of US 202 is part of the National Highway System.

== History ==
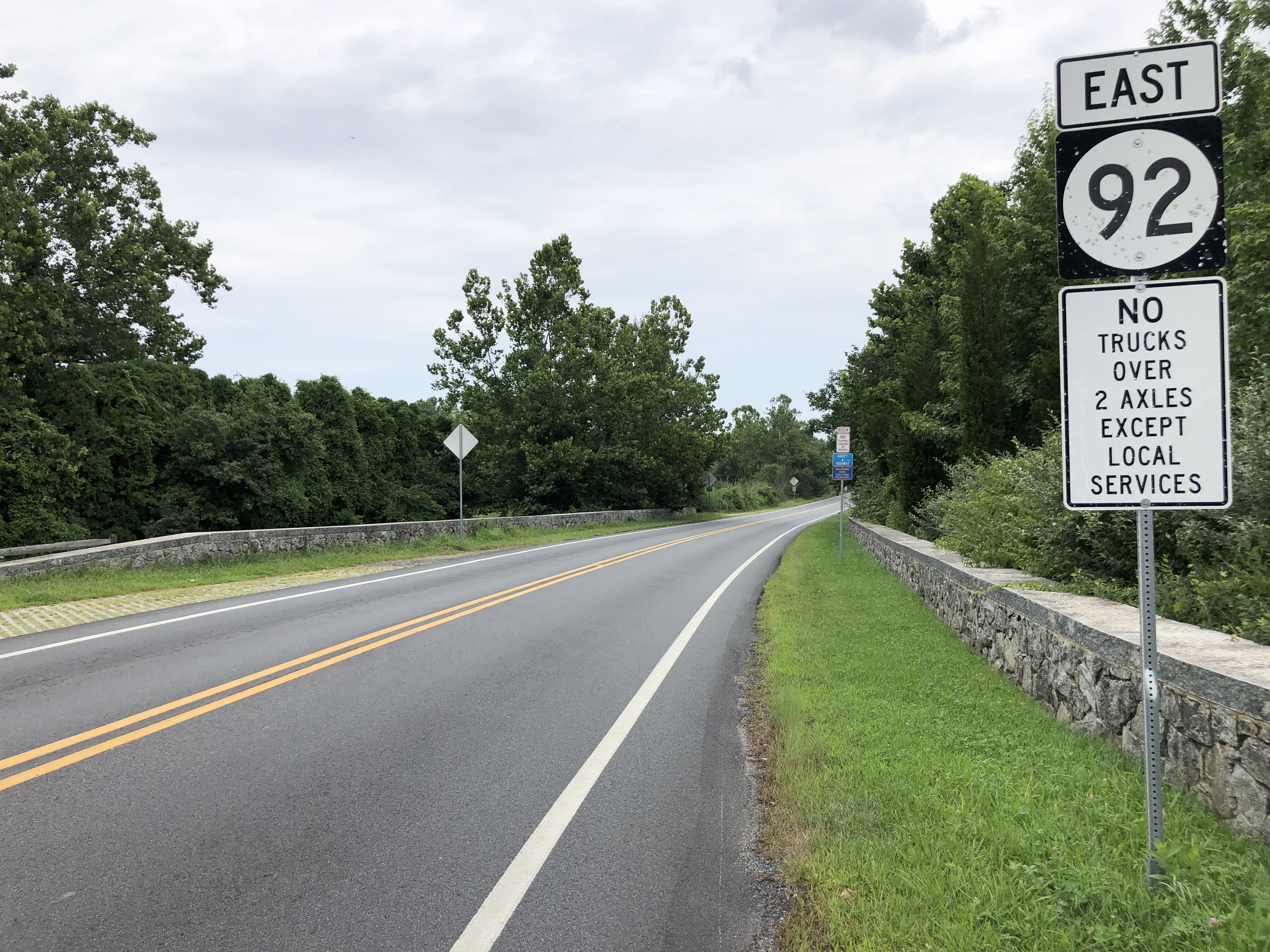
DE 92 eastbound past DE 100 near Montchanin

By 1920, what is now DE 92 originally existed as a county road, with the portion east of Foulk Road proposed to become a state highway. The state highway between Foulk Road and Philadelphia Pike was completed four years later. By 1931, the portion of road between Grubb Road and Foulk Road was upgraded to a state highway. The state highway portion was extended west to Concord Pike by 1936.

By 1968, DE 92 was designated onto its current alignment between DE 100 and US 13, with the easternmost portion replacing what had been designated a part of US 13 Bypass. DE 92 was widened into a divided highway by 1997 between US 202 and DE 261 and between DE 3 and DE 491. Two years later, the road was upgraded to a divided highway between DE 261 and DE 3.

== Major intersections ==
The entire route is in New Castle County.

Location	mi	km	Destinations	Notes
Montchanin	0.00	0.00	DE 100 (Montchanin Road)	Western terminus
Brandywine	3.18	5.12	US 202 (Concord Pike)	
Ways Corner	5.51	8.87	DE 261 (Foulk Road)	
Hanbys Corner	6.25	10.06	DE 3 south (Marsh Road)	Northern terminus of DE 3
Claymont	8.12	13.07	I-95 – Chester, Philadelphia, Wilmington, Baltimore	Exit 11 on I-95
Claymont			DE 491 north (Hickman Road)	Westbound right-in/right-out; southern terminus of DE 491
Claymont	8.83	14.21	US 13 (Philadelphia Pike) – Claymont	Eastern terminus
1.000 mi = 1.609 km; 1.000 km = 0.621 mi: Incomplete access
