= Naiman (surname) =

Naiman is an Ashkenazic Jewish surname, corresponding to German Neumann. Notable people with the surname include:

- Anatoly Naiman (born 1936), Russian poet, translator and writer
- Robert Naiman, multiple persons
  - Robert Naiman (activist)
  - Robert J. Naiman (born 1947), professor at the University of Washington in Seattle
