= Naiman =

Naiman may refer to:

- Naimans, group of people dwelling on the steppe of Central Asia
- Naiman Banner, county in Inner Mongolia, China
- Naiman-Beg, title that means "Prince of Naimans"
- Naiman (surname)

== See also ==
- Naaman (disambiguation)
- Nyman, English and Swedish surname
