= Naman =

Naman may refer to:

- Naman language, a language of Vanuatu
- Naman, Iran (disambiguation), several villages in Iran
- Naman, New South Wales, a locality in Australia
- Naman (surname), a surname originating from the Khatri community

== People with the first name ==
- Naman Ahuja (born 1974), Indian art historian and curator
- Naman Keïta (born 1978), French athlete
- Naman Ojha (born 1983), Indian cricketer
- Naman Ramachandran, Indian critic and journalist
- Naman Shaw (born 1982), Indian television actor
- Naman Tanwar (born 1998), Indian boxer

== See also ==
- Naaman (disambiguation)
- Nama (disambiguation)
