= Siloam United Methodist Church =

Church in Delaware County, Pennsylvania, US

Coordinates: 39.838229°N 75.495207°W

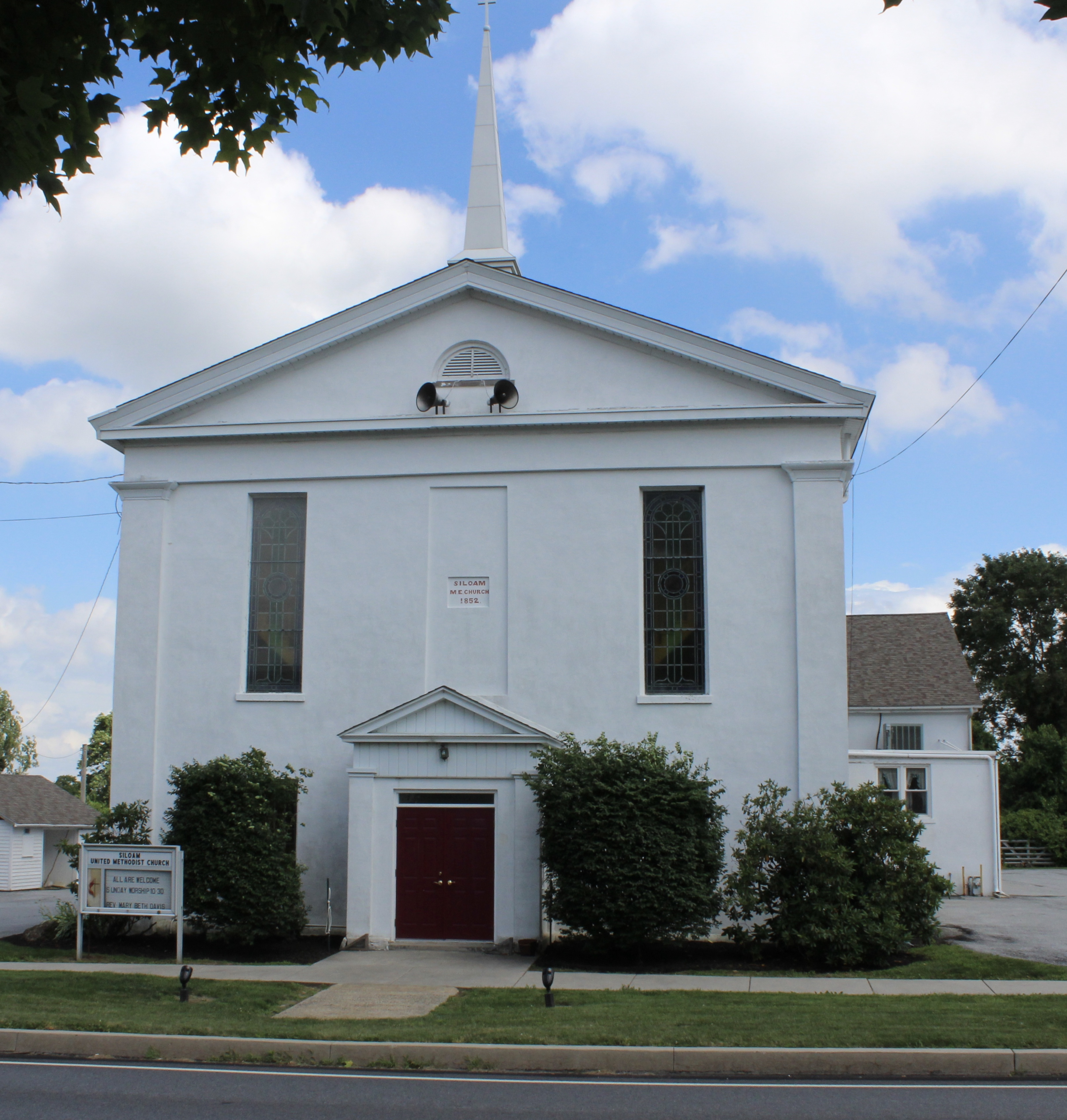
Siloam United Methodist Church in 2017.

Siloam United Methodist Church is a Methodist church built in 1852 in Bethel Township, Delaware County, Pennsylvania, United States. It is located at 3720 Foulk Road.

== History ==
Siloam United Methodist Church was a branch of the Chester-Bethel Church in Wilmington, Delaware and was founded in 1852. There was a dispute in the Chester-Bethel congregation when the pastor purchased hymnals and organized a choir. The older Methodists saw this as a return to the practices of the Church of England from which the Methodist Church had split. The dispute ultimately caused part of the congregation to leave in the late 1840s and form Siloam United Methodist Church. Property for the church was donated by Samuel Hanby and Samuel Hance.

The growth and expansion of the church lead to a mission in Chelsea, Pennsylvania which was established in 1871 at the Ebenezer Chapel. Services were held at the Ebenezer Chapel until the 1920s. The building is now a private residence.

Francis Harvey Green is buried at the Siloam United Methodist Church cemetery.
