= Booths Corner, Pennsylvania =

Unincorporated community in Pennsylvania, US

- Unincorporated community
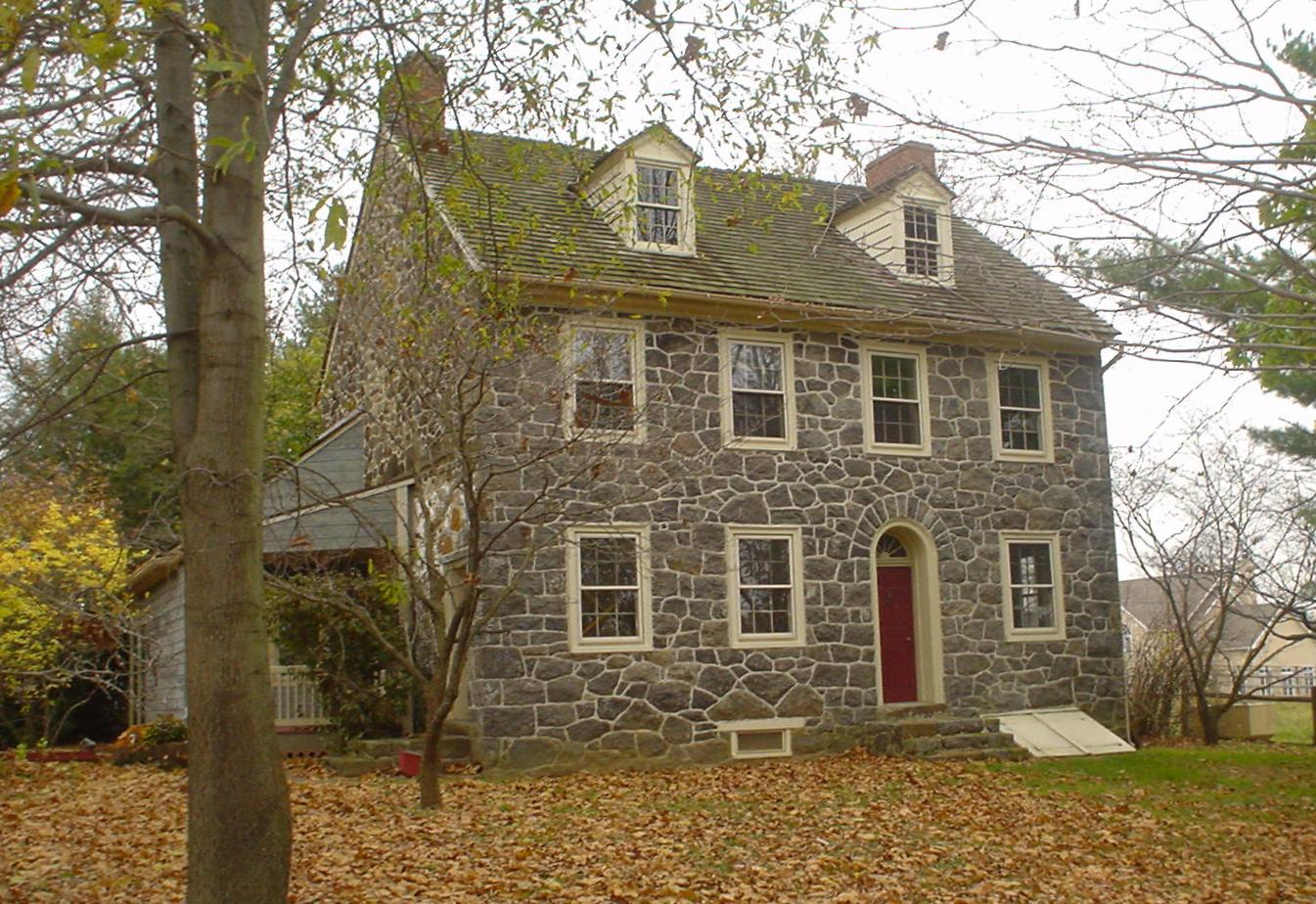
- The Booth Farm, built 1819

- Location within Pennsylvania Location within the United States
- Coordinates: 39°50′21″N 75°29′39″W
- Country: United States
- State: Pennsylvania
- County: Delaware
- Township: Bethel
- Elevation: 387 ft (118 m)
- Time zone: UTC-5 (Eastern (EST))
  - Summer (DST): UTC-4 (EDT)
- Area codes: 610 and 484
- GNIS feature ID: 1170001

Booths Corner is an unincorporated community in Bethel Township in Delaware County, Pennsylvania, United States. Booths Corner is located at the intersection of Pennsylvania Route 261 (Foulk Road) and Pennsylvania Route 491 (Naamans Creek Road).

Booths Corner is named after Thomas Booth, who became a merchant in the village in 1854 and served as postmaster. The Booth family in Bethel can be traced back to Robert Booth who emigrated to Pennsylvania from Yorkshire, England in 1712.

== Notable people ==
Francis Harvey Green - educator, poet and lecturer
