= Zebleys Corner, Pennsylvania =

Unincorporated community in Pennsylvania, US

- Unincorporated community
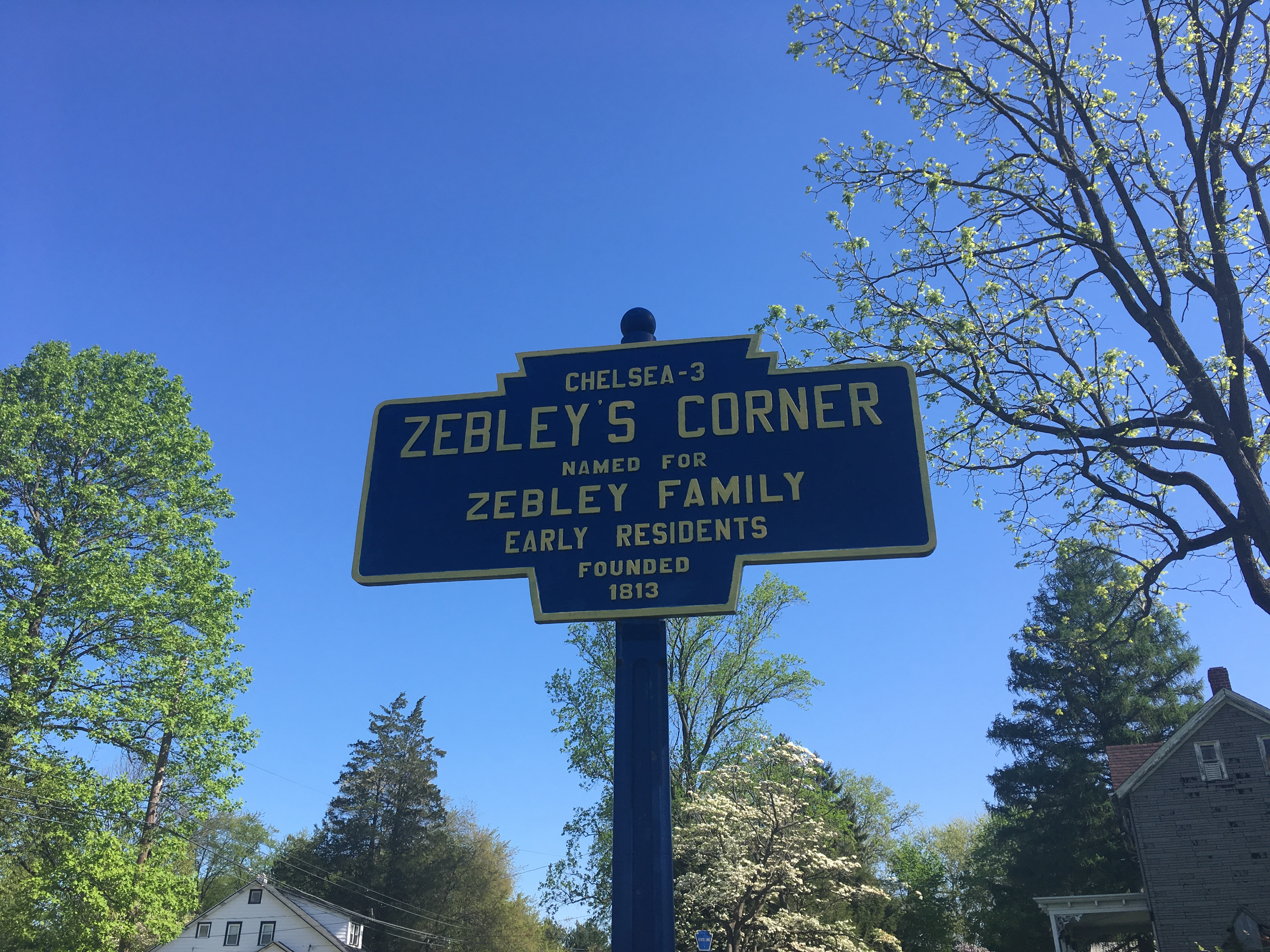
- Keystone Marker for Zebleys Corner

- Location within Pennsylvania Location within the United States
- Coordinates: 39°50′05″N 75°29′55″W
- Country: United States
- State: Pennsylvania
- County: Delaware
- Township: Bethel
- Elevation: 384 ft (117 m)
- Time zone: UTC-5 (Eastern (EST))
  - Summer (DST): UTC-4 (EDT)
- Area codes: 610 and 484
- GNIS feature ID: 1217379

Zebleys Corner is an unincorporated community located in Bethel Township in Delaware County, Pennsylvania, United States. Zebleys Corner is located at the intersection of Pennsylvania Route 261 and Zebley Road, a short distance north of the Delaware border.
