= Robert Naiman =

Robert Naiman may refer to:

- Robert Naiman (activist), American policy analyst and activist
- Robert J. Naiman (born 1947), American professor and researcher of ecology
