= Naaman (disambiguation) =

Naaman is a commander of the armies of Ben-Hadad II in the time of Joram, king of Israel. He is mentioned in 2 Kings 5.

Naaman or Naamans may also refer to:

== Places ==
- Naaman, Delaware, an unincorporated community in New Castle County, Delaware, United States
- Naamans Creek (spelled Naaman Creek on federal maps), tributary of the Delaware River
- Naamans Gardens, Delaware, an unincorporated community in New Castle County, Delaware, United States
- Naamans Manor, Delaware, an unincorporated community in New Castle County, Delaware, United States
- Naaman Forest High School, public secondary school located in Garland, Texas (USA)
- Belus River, a river in Israel earlier known as Na'amân River

== People ==
=== Mononym ===
- Naaman (biblical figure), one of the sons of Benjamin
- Naâman (1990–2025), French reggae artist

=== Given name ===
- Naaman Roosevelt (born 1987), American football wide receiver

=== Surname ===
- Issam Naaman (born 1937), Lebanese lawyer and politician
- Nicolas Naaman (1911–1982), Catholic archbishop
- Yonit Naaman (born 1975), Israeli poet and editor

== See also ==
- Naiman (disambiguation)
- Naman (disambiguation)
- Nu'man
