= Chester-Bethel Church =

Chester-Bethel United Methodist Church
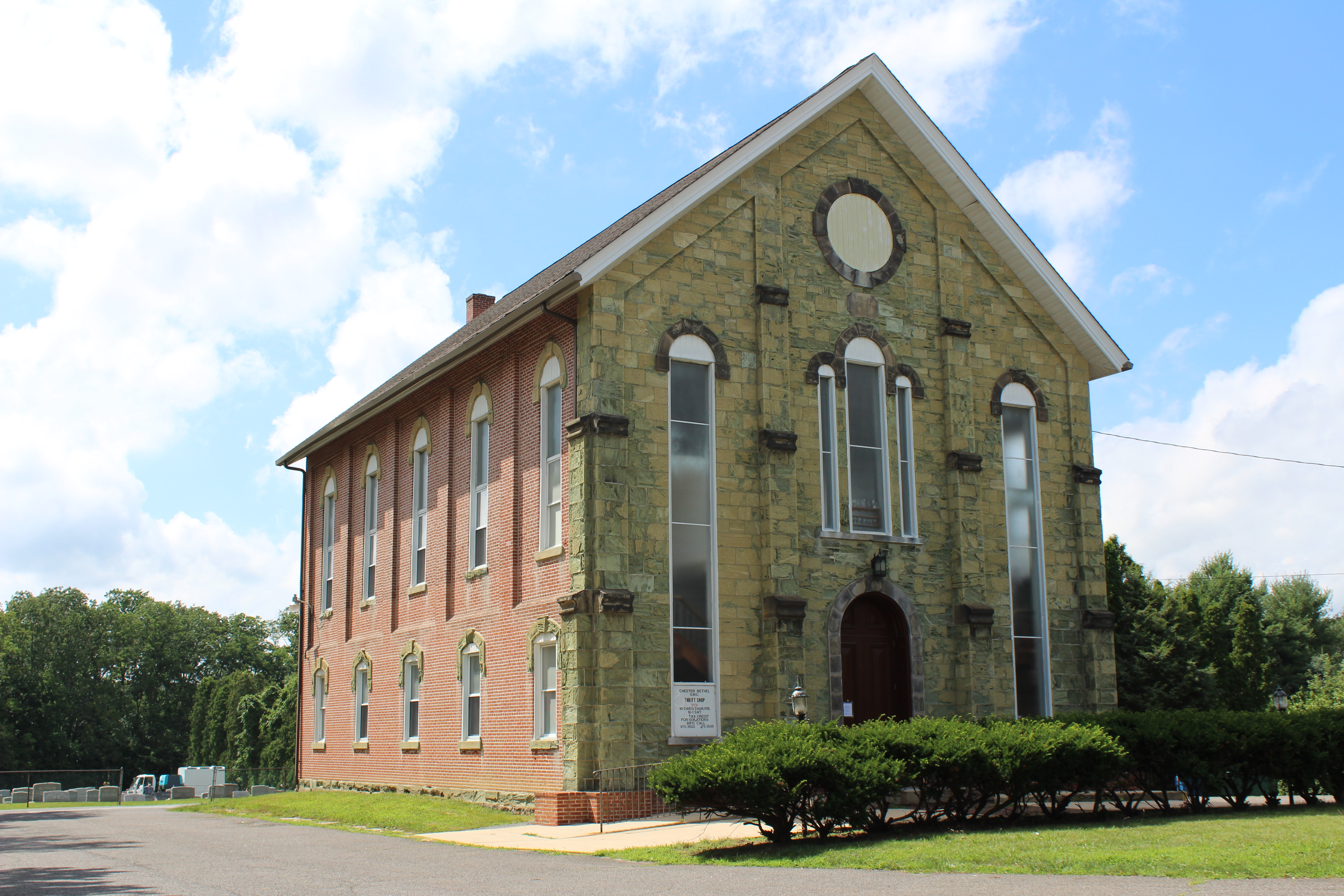
- Chester-Bethel United Methodist Church
- 39°49′55″N 75°30′00″W
- Location: 2619 Foulk Road, Wilmington, Delaware 19810
- Country: United States
- Denomination: United Methodist Church
- Website: www.chesterbethel.org/index.html

Architecture
- Functional status: Active
- Completed: 1873

Clergy
- Priest: Rev. Karen Hoff

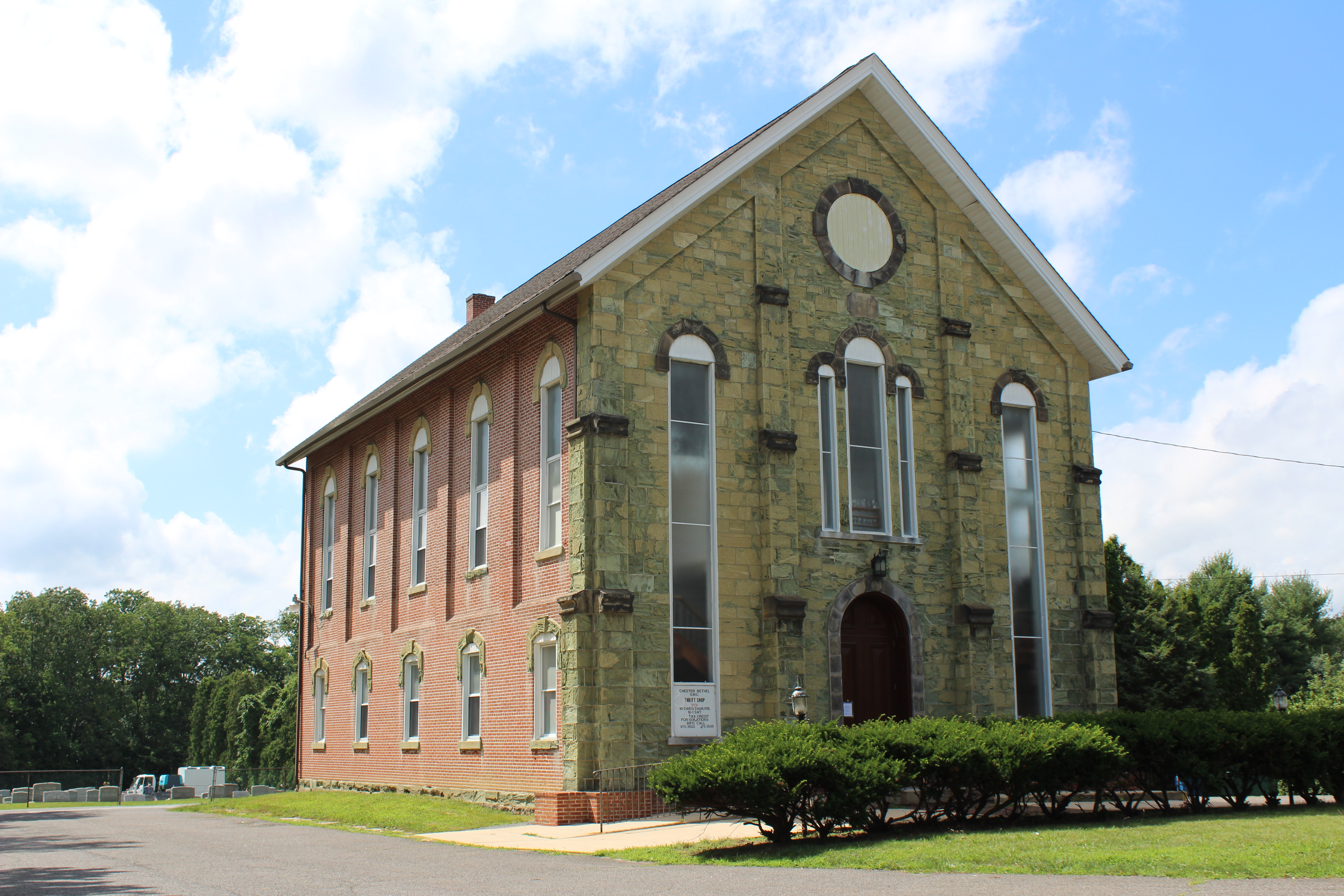
Serpentine stone and brick Chester-Bethel church built in 1873. Photo taken in 2017

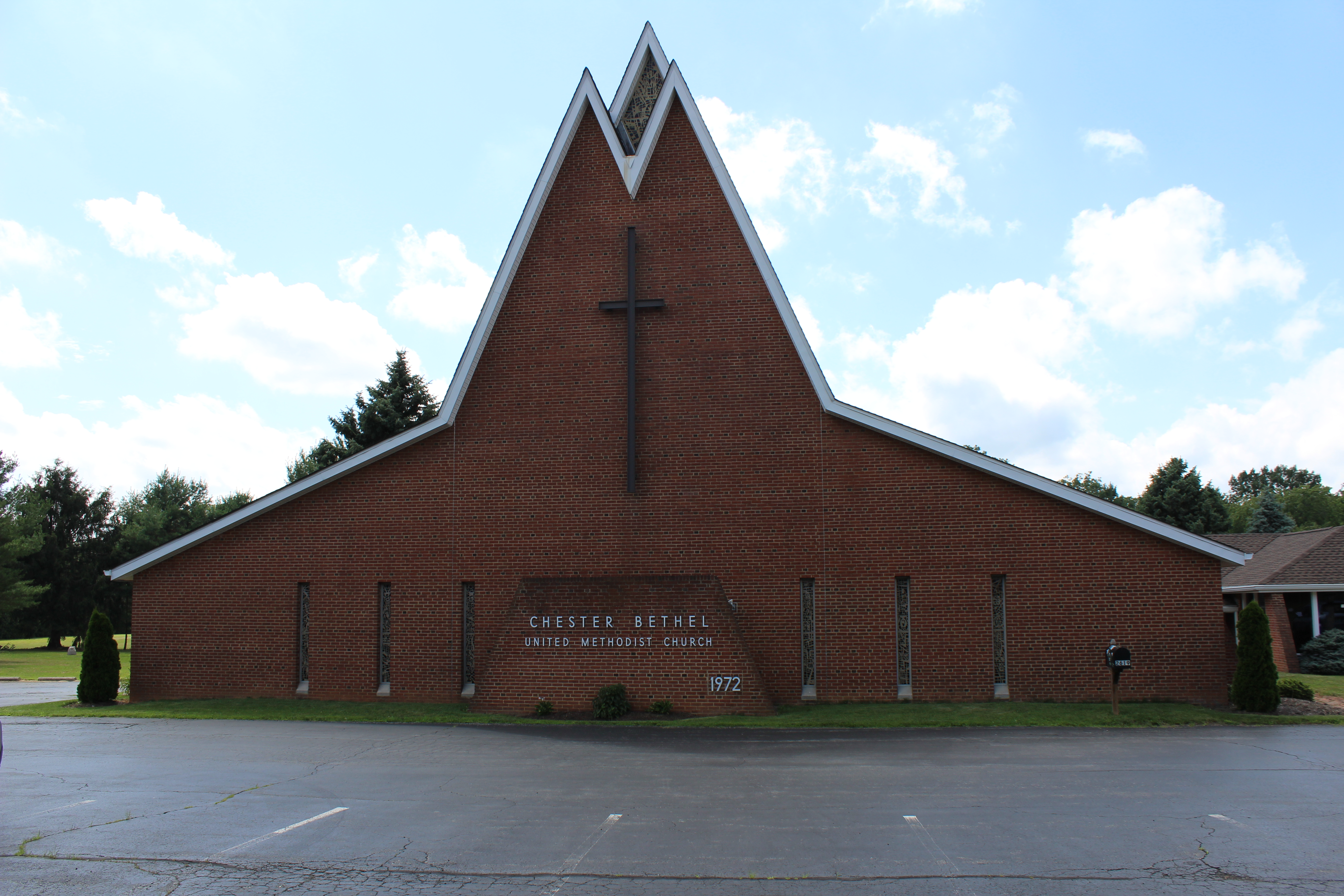
Chester-Bethel Church sanctuary built in 1972. Photo taken in 2017

Chester-Bethel Methodist Church is a Methodist church built in 1873 in Wilmington, Delaware, United States. The congregation, which dates to 1780 is the oldest Methodist congregation which has continuously gathered in the state of Delaware.

== History ==
The roots of this congregation can be traced to Methodist pioneer Thomas Webb, who visited the area to spread the message of his faith. Inspired by his message, a local society of Methodists was formed circa 1775. The first church built in 1780 was a log meeting house built on land donated by Robert Cloud and was known as Cloud's chapel. The log building was torn down and replaced in 1799 by a stone church which became known as Bethel Methodist Episcopal Church.

Francis Asbury, an early American Methodist, is known to have preached at Chester-Bethel in 1809 and 1810.

There was a dispute in the Chester-Bethel congregation when the pastor purchased hymnals and organized a choir. The older Methodists saw this as a return to the practices of the Church of England from which the Methodist Church had split. The dispute ultimately caused part of the congregation to leave in the late 1840s and form Siloam United Methodist Church in Bethel Township, Delaware County, Pennsylvania.

In 1873, a new serpentine stone and brick church was built and named Chester-Bethel to commemorate the previous Bethel church and the Chester preaching circuit to which the church belonged. A new parsonage was built in 1913, Fellowship Hall in 1953 and a new sanctuary in 1972.

The 1873 built serpentine and brick church is currently used as a thrift shop.

== Notable burials ==
- Thomas J. Clayton – President Judge of the Thirty-Second Judicial District of Pennsylvania
