= Garnet Valley, Pennsylvania =

Unincorporated community in Pennsylvania, US

- Unincorporated community
- Location of Garnet Valley in Pennsylvania Garnet Valley (the United States)
- Coordinates: 39°51′30″N 75°28′07″W
- Country: United States
- State: Pennsylvania
- County: Delaware
- Townships: Bethel
- Township City: 2006

Population (2010)
  - Total: 28,553
- Time zone: UTC-5 (EST)
  - Summer (DST): UTC-4 (EDT)
- ZIP Code: 19060
- Area codes: 484 and 610
- Website: www.twp.bethel.pa.us

Garnet Valley is an unincorporated community in Delaware County, Pennsylvania, United States. The name was created by the United States Postal Service in late 2006 to allow residents of Bethel Township and Concord Township who were within the 19061 ZIP code and were part of the Garnet Valley School District to distinguish themselves from residents of Upper Chichester Township. The default "city name" for the 19061 ZIP code is Marcus Hook; other acceptable names in the ZIP code include Trainer, Linwood, and Boothwyn. The residents of Bethel Township and Concord Township sought a new postal identity because the ZIP code "city names" are often confused with actual municipal names.

As of July 1, 2009, Garnet Valley was removed from ZIP Code 19061 and assigned to a new ZIP code, 19060.

Although the community name is derived from the Garnet Valley School District, the district's headquarters are not within the Garnet Valley ZIP code. The district's address is in Glen Mills 19342.

== History ==
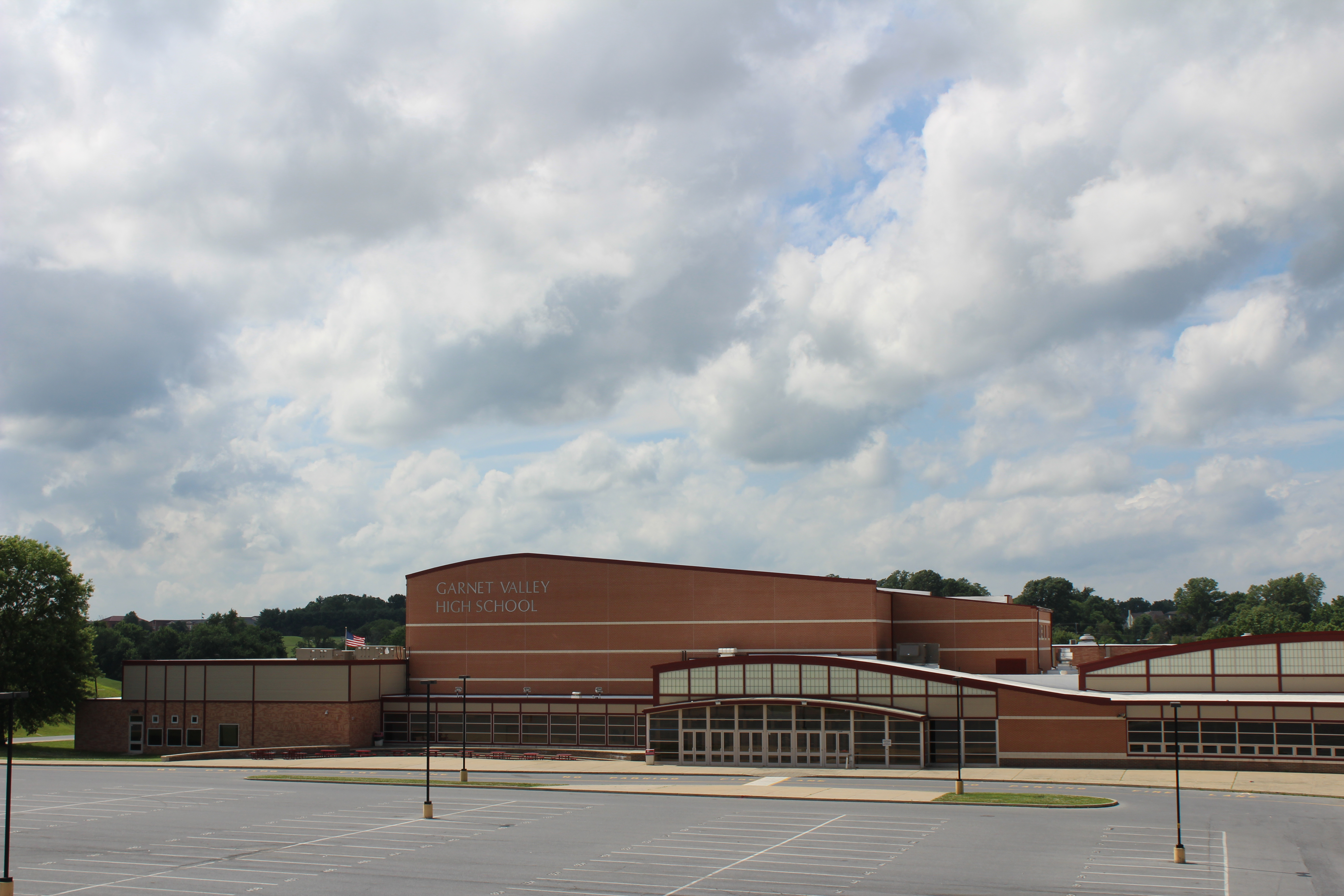
Garnet Valley High School, 2017

The community name is derived from the garnet mines established in Bethel Township by Herman Behr & Co. of New York in 1879. The mine operated until 1912.

== Parks ==
Bethel Community Park

== Notable people ==
- Bill Haley, rock and roll musician
