= Naamans Creek =

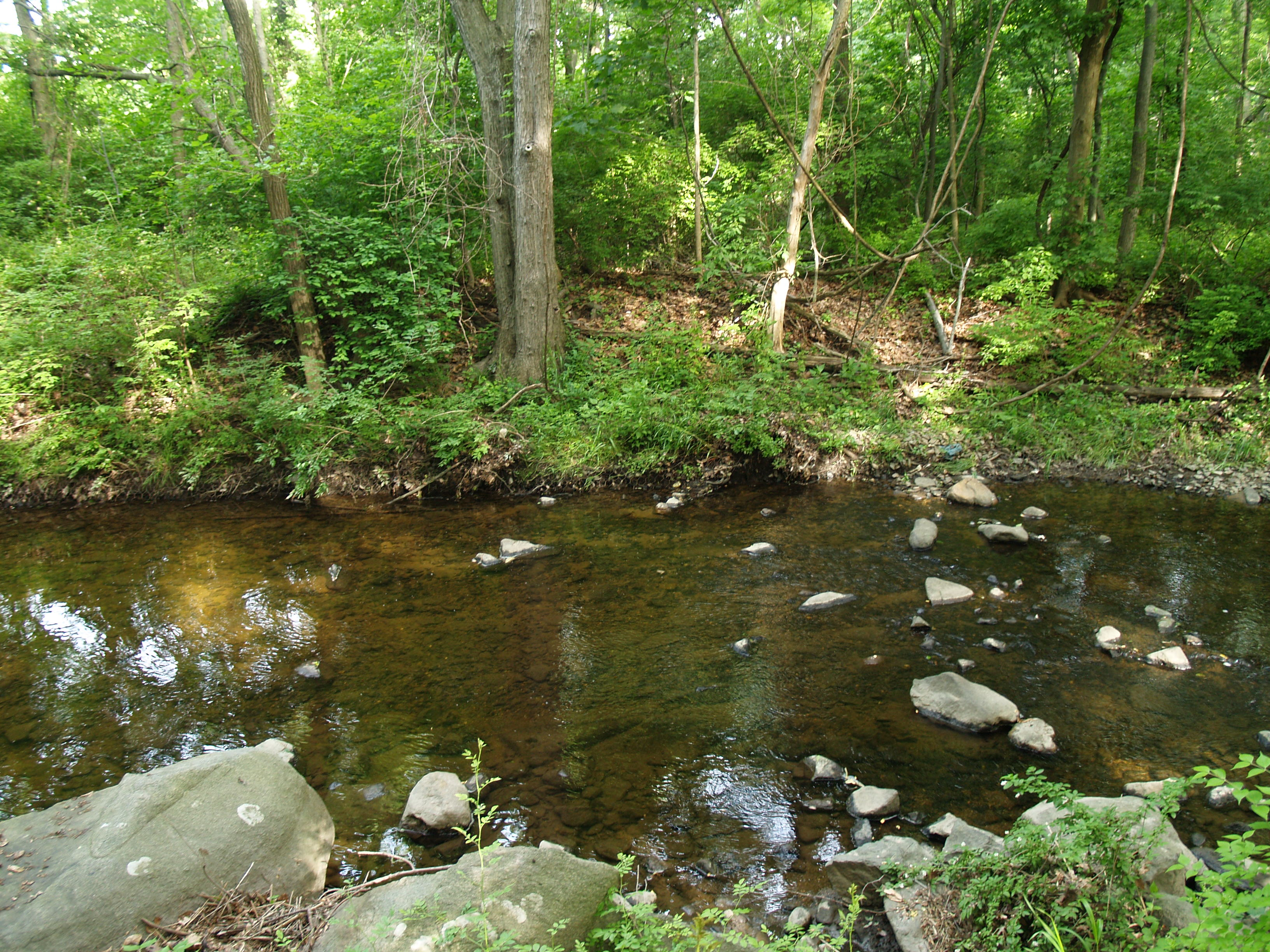
- Naamans Creek at Woods Haven Kruse Park

- Location of Naamans Creek mouth Naamans Creek (the United States)

Location
- Country: United States
- State: Delaware
- State: Pennsylvania
- County: New Castle, Delaware
- County: Delaware, Pennsylvania

Physical characteristics
- Source: confluence of West Branch and East Branch Naamans Creek
  - location: Bethel Township, Pennsylvania
  - coordinates: 39°50′34″N 75°29′32″W
- Mouth: Delaware River
  - location: Claymont, Delaware
  - coordinates: 39°48′19″N 75°26′11″W
  - elevation: sea level (0 ft.)

Basin features
- Progression: Delaware River → Delaware Bay → Atlantic Ocean
- River system: Delaware River
- Tributaries
  - left: East Branch Naamans Creek
  - right: West Branch Naamans Creek; South Branch Naamans Creek

Naamans Creek (spelled Naaman Creek on federal maps) is a tributary of the Delaware River that is located in northeast New Castle County, Delaware and southeast Delaware County, Pennsylvania.

== History and geography ==
This creek is believed to be named after a Minqua chief who befriended the Swedish settlers of the area. A large tract of land along the creek was deeded to Governor Johan Risingh by chief Peminacka in 1655.

The stream rises near the intersection of Foulk Road and Naamans Creek Road at 39°50′34″N 75°29′32″W in Bethel Township, Pennsylvania, flows through Arden, Delaware, and discharges into the Delaware River at 39°48′19″N 75°26′11″W in Claymont, Delaware.

== See also ==
- List of rivers of Delaware
- List of rivers of Pennsylvania
