= Francis Harvey Green =

American educator, poet and lecturer (1861–1951)

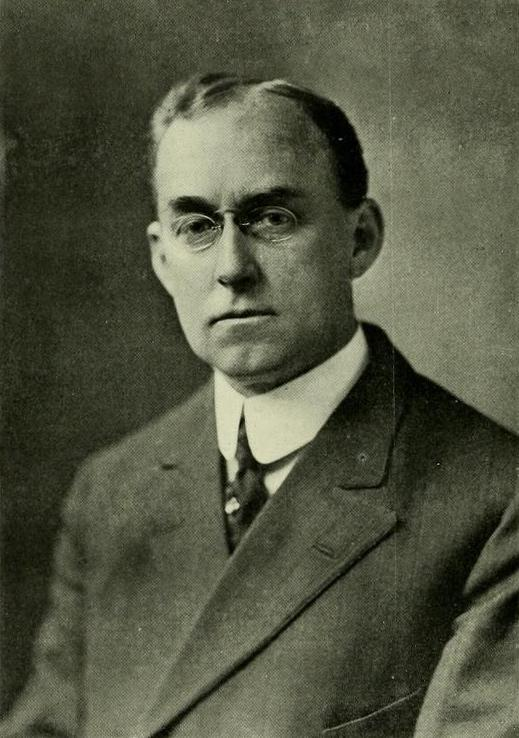
- Francis Harvey Green circa 1912
- Born: May 19, 1861; Booths Corner, Pennsylvania, U.S.
- Died: January 23, 1951 (aged 89)
- Resting place: Siloam United Methodist Church cemetery, Bethel Township, Pennsylvania, U.S.
- Occupations: Educator, poet, lecturer

Francis Harvey Green (May 19, 1861 – January 23, 1951) was an American educator, poet and lecturer. He served as Chair of English at West Chester Normal School for 30 years and as Headmaster of the Pennington School. The Francis Harvey Green Elementary School in Bethel Township, Pennsylvania, and two libraries at West Chester University were named in his honor.

== Early life and education ==
Green was born in Booths Corner, Pennsylvania, on May 19, 1861, to Sharpless and Mary Booth Green.

Green graduated from West Chester Normal School in 1882. He received a Masters of Arts degree from Dickinson University in 1893. Temple University honored him with a Doctor of Literature in 1909 and Juniata College with a Doctor of Laws in 1931. He did special work in English, especially Anglo-Saxon, at Amherst College (1860) and Harvard (1894–1895).

On September 12, 1911, Green married Gertrude Heritage, a chemistry instructor at Bryn Mawr College. Heritage co-authored six chemistry papers with Elmer Peter Kohler.

== Career ==
He served as the Chair of English at Juniata College until 1888 and took a similar position with the West Chester Normal School in 1890. He held the position of Chair of English at West Chester Normal School for 30 years. He resigned in 1920 to become headmaster of the Pennington School in New Jersey. He retired in 1943 but continued as headmaster emeritus.

He was known as a reformer who lectured frequently on temperance and moral issues and formed the Knights of Temperance in Chester County.

He was a member of the Pennsylvania State Teachers Association, National Education Association, Transatlantic Society, American Asiatic Association, Harvard Club, and Dickens Fellowship. He served as the president of the YMCA in West Chester, Pennsylvania and of the Chester County Historical Society.

== Publications ==
- Notes on Rhetoric (1909)
- Quotations from Great Authors (1919)
- What They Say Day by Day (1916)
- What Others Say Each Passing Day (1920)
- Desirable Degrees (1922)

== Death and legacy ==
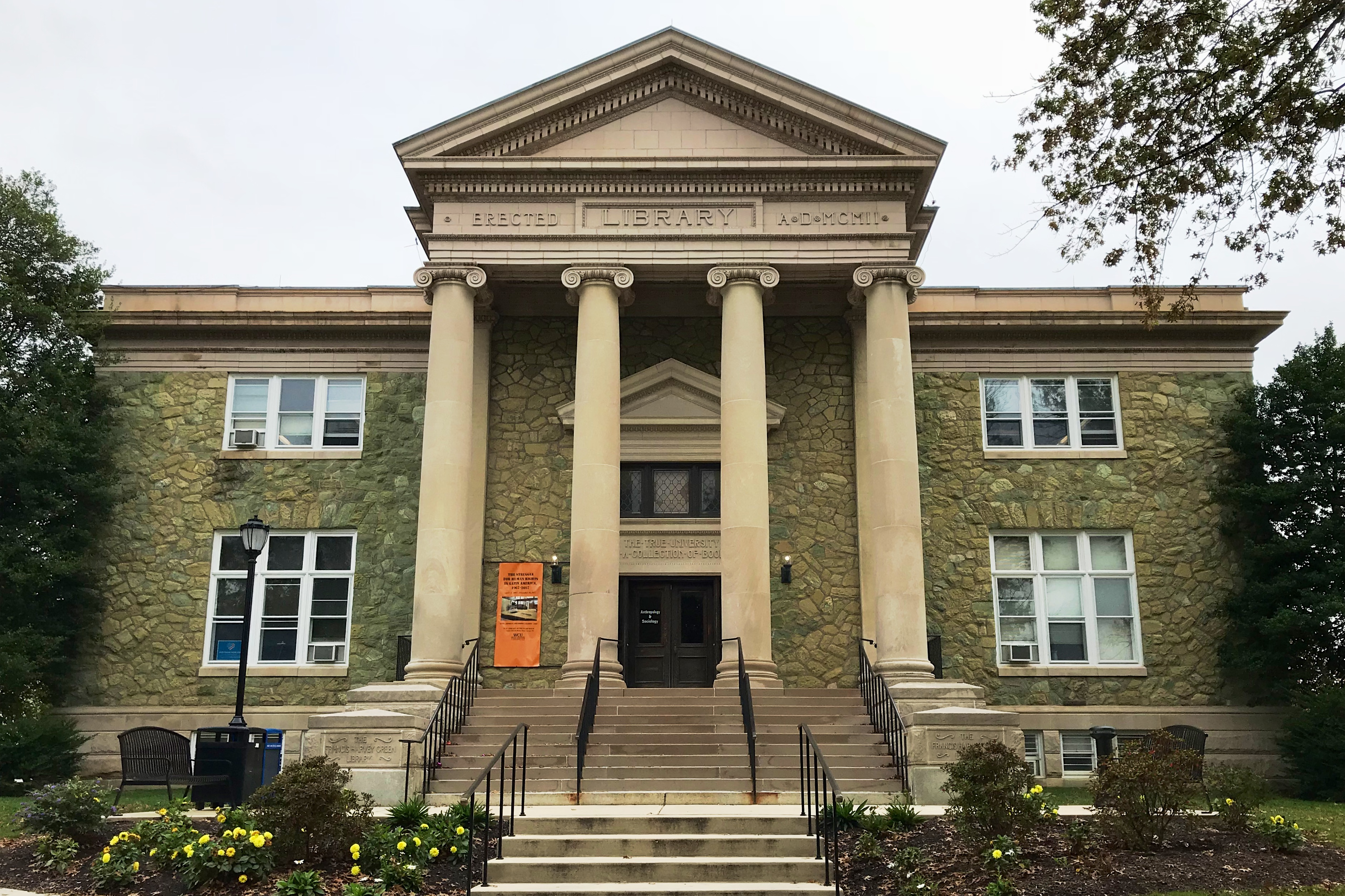
Old Francis Harvey Green Library at West Chester University

West Chester University named its library after Green in May 1947. The State of Pennsylvania honored him during Pennsylvania Week, 1949, by naming him Pennsylvania Ambassador, for outstanding achievement in the best tradition of the Commonwealth.

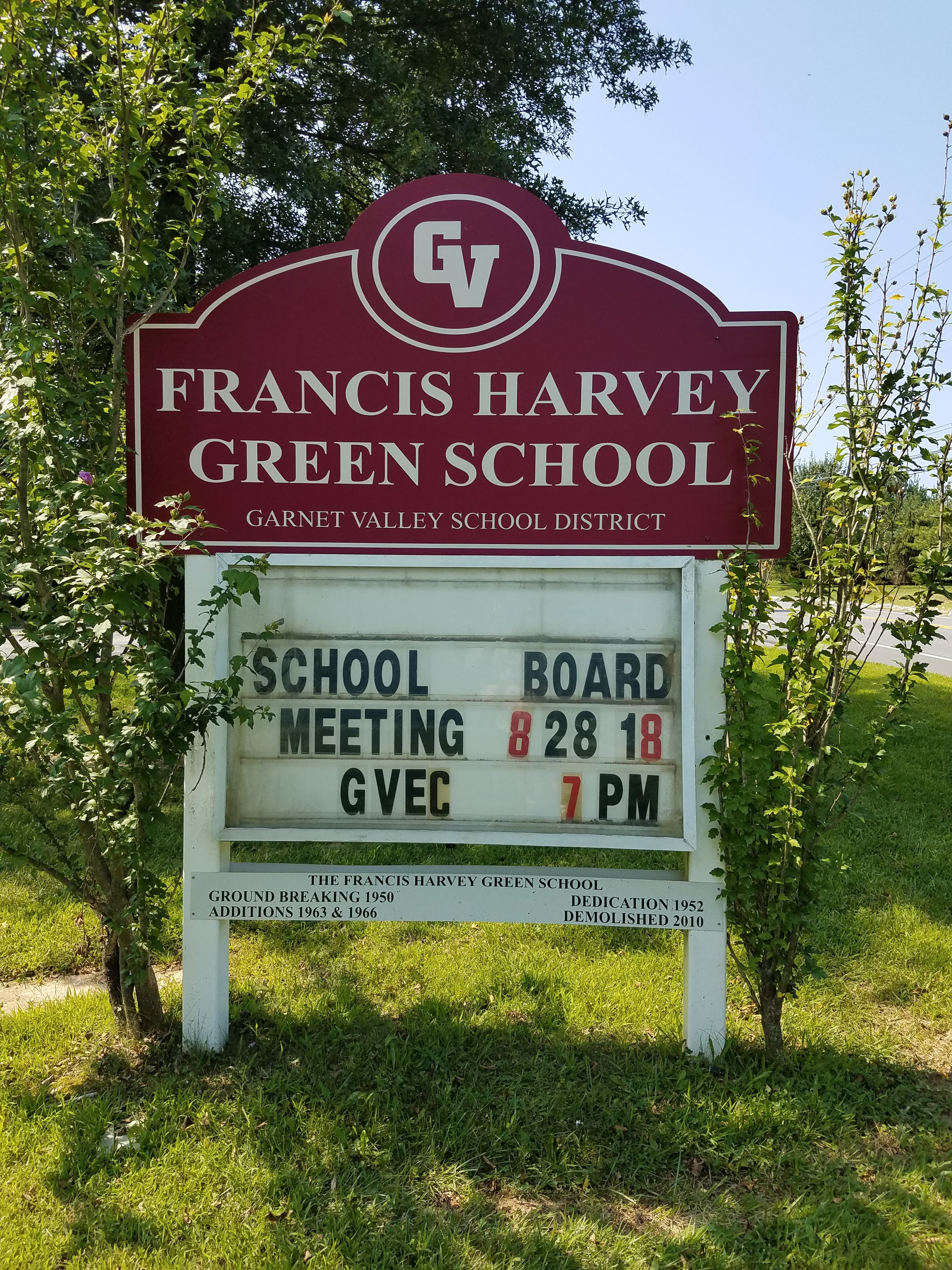
Sign for Francis Harvey Green School in Bethel Township, Pennsylvania

Bethel township named the first non-single room school in their township after Dr. Green. He was present at the groundbreaking ceremony and spoke of education in Bethel. Green died within a few months and was not able to see the completion and opening of the school. The dedication for Francis Harvey Green School took place on November 9, 1952. The school was demolished in 2010.

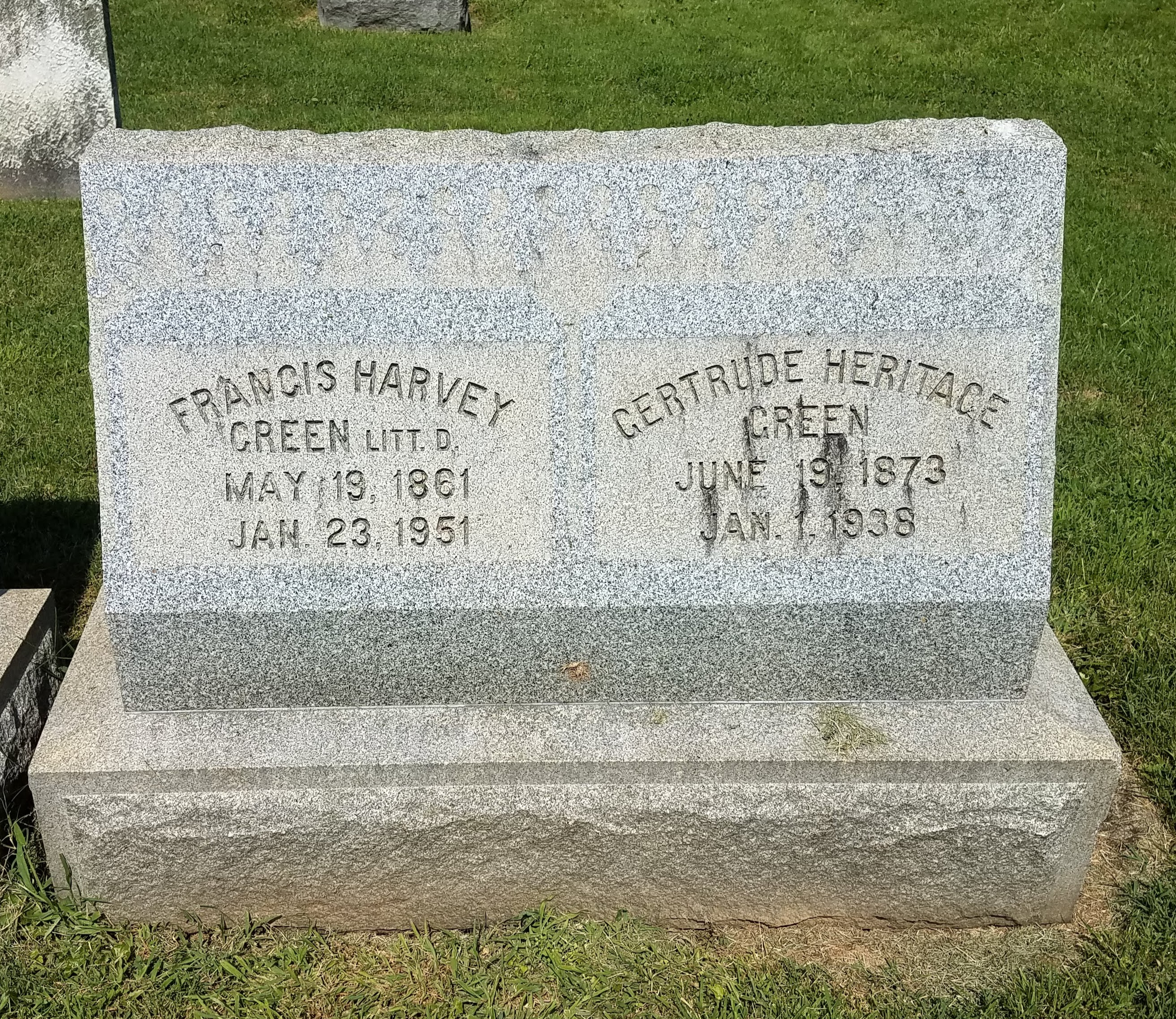
Francis Harvey and Gertrude Heritage Green grave at Siloam United Methodist Church cemetery in Bethel Township, Pennsylvania.

Green died on January 23, 1951, and was interred at Siloam United Methodist Church cemetery in Bethel Township, Pennsylvania.

A new library dedicated on October 30, 1966, at West Chester University was also named after Green.
