= Route 491 (Pennsylvania–Delaware) =

Highway in Delaware and Pennsylvania

Route 491

Route information
- Maintained by PennDOT and DelDOT
- Length: 6.02 mi (9.69 km) 5.661 miles (9.110 km) PA 491; 0.36 miles (0.58 km) DE 491
- Existed: 1928–present

Major junctions
- West end: US 202 in Concordville, PA
- PA 261 in Booths Corner, PA
- South end: DE 92 in Claymont, DE

Location
- Country: United States
- State: Pennsylvania
- Counties: PA: Delaware; DE: New Castle

Highway system
- Pennsylvania State Route System; Interstate; US; State; Scenic; Legislative
- Delaware State Route System; List; Byways
| ← PA 490 | PA 491 | → PA 492 |
| ← DE 404 | DE 491 | → I-495 |

Pennsylvania Route 491 (PA 491) and Delaware Route 491 (DE 491) is a state highway starting in Delaware County, Pennsylvania and ending in New Castle County, Delaware. Also known as Naamans Creek Road, the route runs from U.S. Route 202 (US 202) in Concord Township east to the Delaware border in Lower Chichester Township. In the state of Delaware, the highway runs for 0.36 mi (0.58 km) as a connector between the Pennsylvania border and DE 92 near Claymont, Delaware. PA 491 runs closely parallel to the Delaware border throughout its route. It intersects PA 261 in the Booths Corner section of Bethel Township. The western portion of PA 491 was first designated as part of Legislative Route 135 in 1911. In the 1920s, the Delaware portion of road was built as a state highway while PA 491 was created in 1928.

== Route description ==
=== Pennsylvania ===
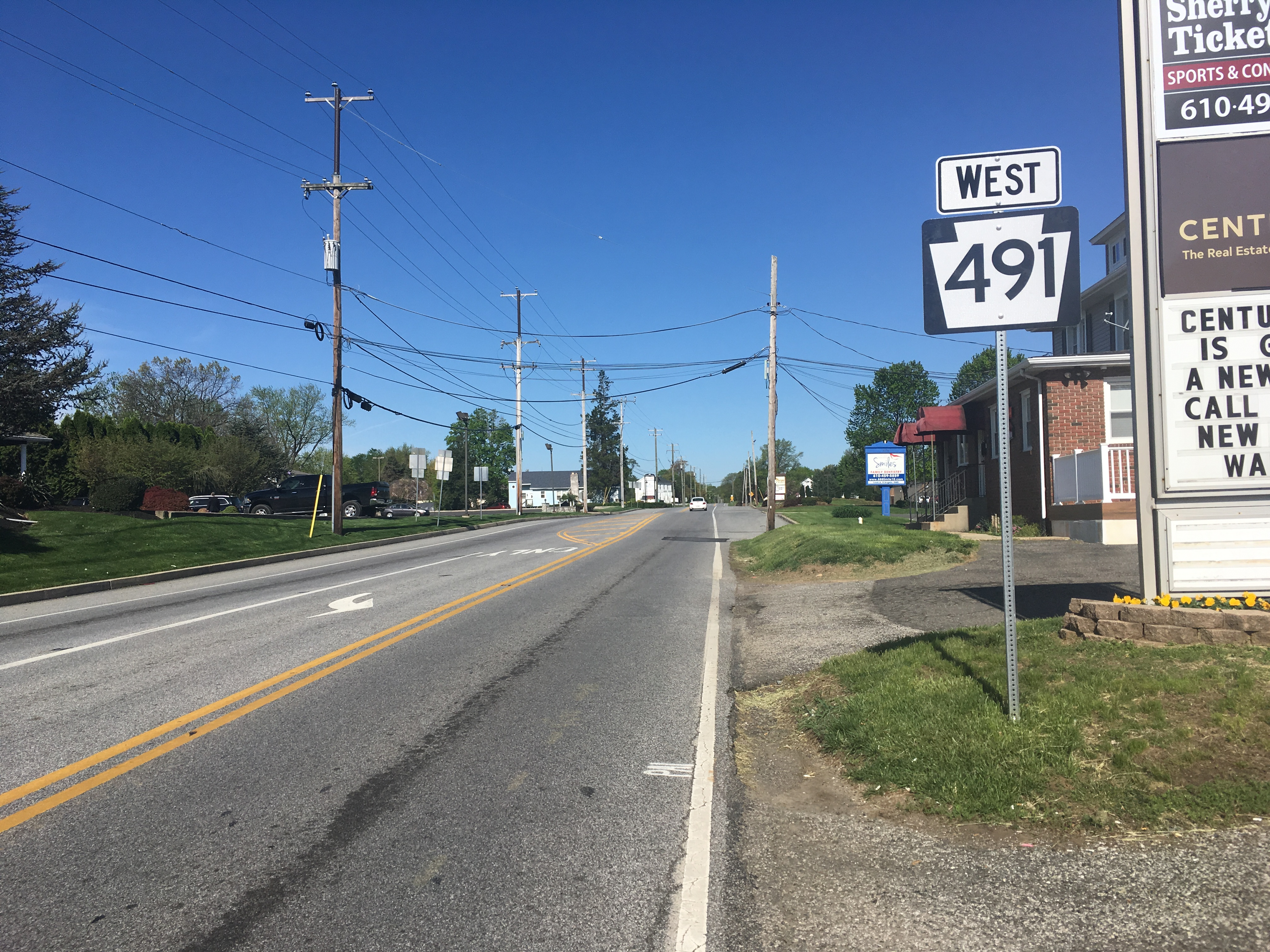
PA 491 westbound past PA 261 in Booths Corner

PA 491 begins at an intersection with US 202 in Concord Township, Delaware County, heading east-southeast on two-lane undivided Naamans Creek Road. The route passes through residential areas, crossing into Bethel Township at the Pyle Road intersection. Upon reaching the community of Booths Corner, PA 491 passes businesses and comes to an intersection with PA 261. Following this intersection, the route runs past more neighborhoods as it enters Upper Chichester Township. Upon reaching the community of Ogden, PA 491 turns to the southeast as it crosses CSX's Philadelphia Subdivision railroad line at-grade. After crossing into Lower Chichester Township, the route passes under I-95 as it heads south into woodland to the Delaware border.

=== Delaware ===
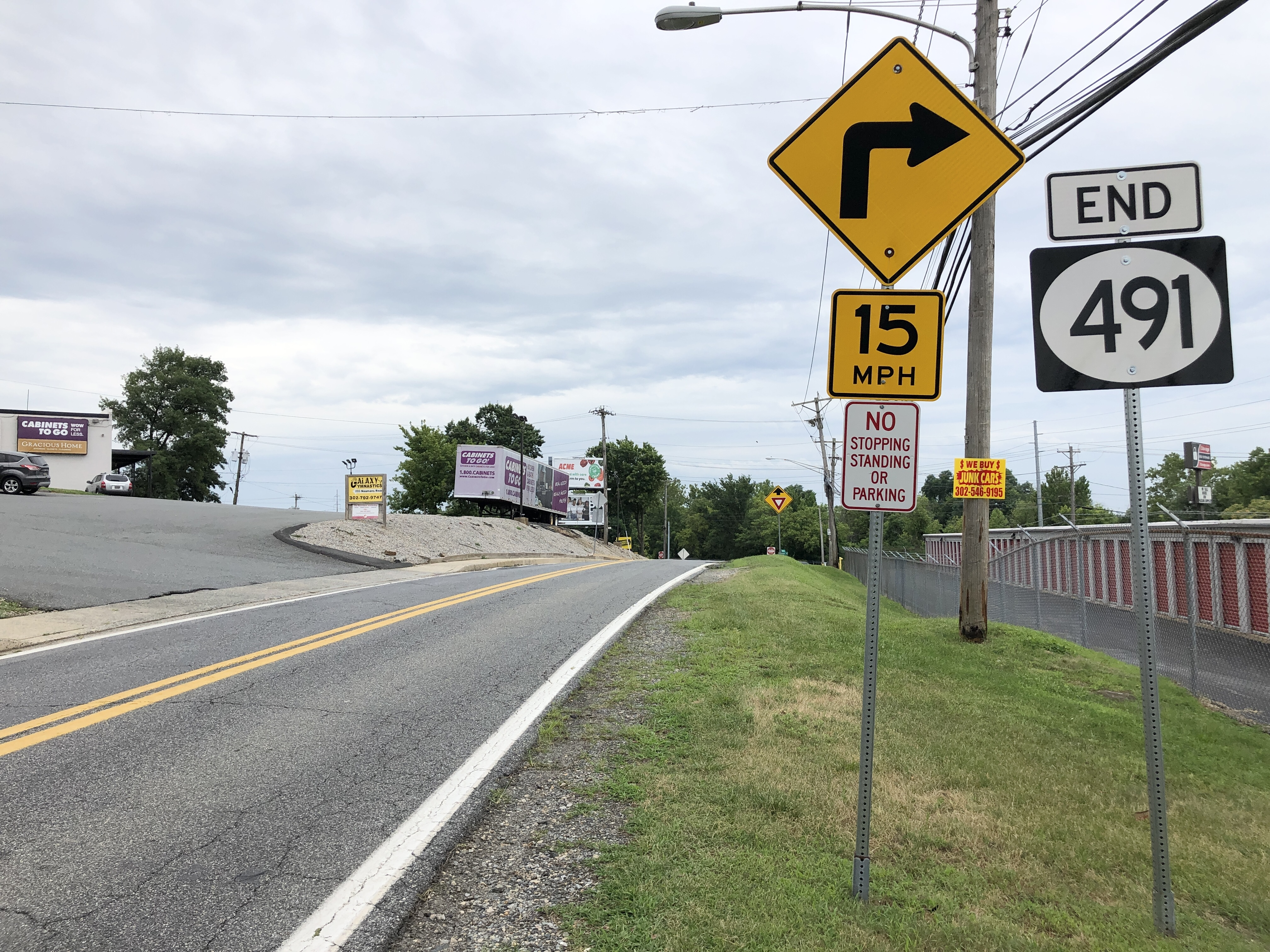
DE 491 approaching its terminus at DE 92 in Claymont

Upon crossing into Delaware, the road becomes DE 491, which carries the name Hickman Road. A short distance past the state line, the road passes an entrance to the former Tri-State Mall and the intersection with residential Woodfield Drive. The road continues south to the east of Naamans Creek between a business to the west and homes to the east prior to ending at DE 92 in Claymont at a right-in/right-out intersection with the westbound lanes of DE 92.

== History ==
What is now PA 491 west of Zebley Road was designated as part of Legislative Route 135 in 1911, a legislative route defined in the Sproul Road Bill that ran from West Chester to the Delaware border in Bethel Township. By 1920, the entire alignment of PA 491 and DE 491 existed as an unimproved county road. By 1925, the Delaware portion of road was completed as a state highway. PA 491 was designated onto its current alignment running from US 122/PA 29 (now US 202) east to the Delaware border in 1928. When first designated, the Pennsylvania portion of the road was paved. The route has remained on the same alignment since.

== Major intersections ==
| State | County | Location | mi | km | Destinations | Notes |
|---|---|---|---|---|---|---|
| Pennsylvania | Delaware | Concord Township | 0.000 | 0.000 | US 202 (Wilmington–West Chester Pike) – Wilmington, West Chester | Western terminus of PA 491 |
| Pennsylvania | Delaware | Bethel Township | 2.440 | 3.927 | PA 261 (Foulk Road) – Chester Heights, Wilmington | |
| Pennsylvania–Delaware state line | | | 5.661 0.36 | 9.110 0.58 | PA 491 becomes DE 491 | |
| Delaware | New Castle | Claymont | 0.00 | 0.00 | DE 92 west (Naamans Road) | Southern terminus of DE 491 |
1.000 mi = 1.609 km; 1.000 km = 0.621 mi: Incomplete access; Route transition
