= Naman (surname) =

Naman is a surname of Indian origin, primarily associated with the Khatri community from the Punjab region of India and Pakistan and Afghanistan, found in Punjabi Hindu, Muslim and Sikh communities. The name is recognized among established Arora–Khatri gotras, as documented in community records.

== Geographic Distribution ==
The surname is most commonly found in Punjab, Delhi, Haryana, Uttar Pradesh, and Bihar, as well as among the South Asian diaspora in countries like Canada, the United States, and the United Kingdom.
