= Chelsea, Pennsylvania =

Unincorporated community in Pennsylvania, US

- Unincorporated community
- Location within Pennsylvania
- Coordinates: 39°52′1″N 75°28′5″W
- Country: United States
- State: Pennsylvania
- County: Delaware
- Township: Bethel
- Elevation: 299 ft (91 m)
- Time zone: UTC-5 (Eastern (EST))
  - Summer (DST): UTC-4 (EDT)
- ZIP code: 19060
- Area codes: 610 and 484
- GNIS feature ID: 1203253

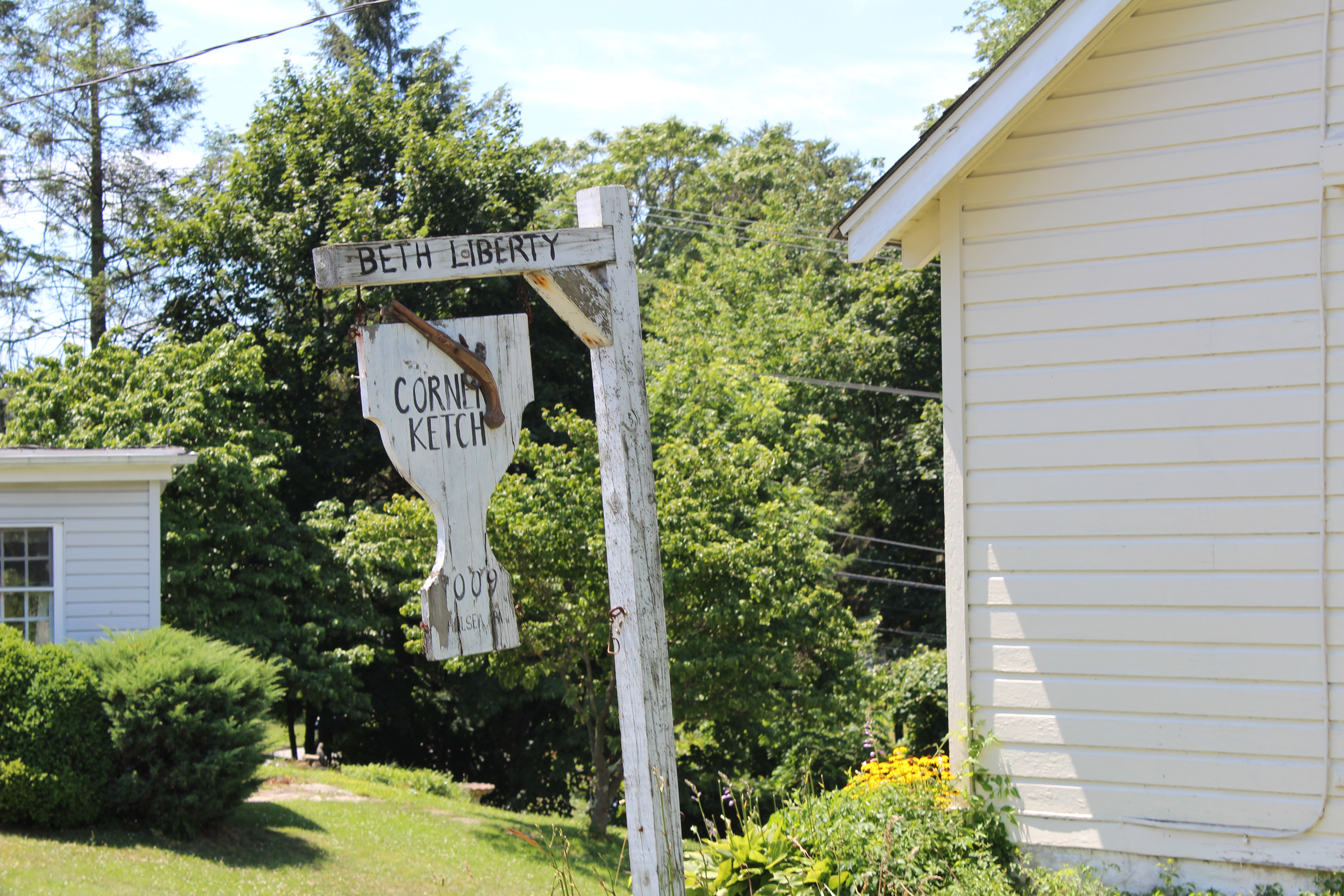
Photo taken in 2017 of sign in Chelsea, Pennsylvania

Chelsea is an unincorporated community in Bethel Township in Delaware County, Pennsylvania, United States. Chelsea is located at the intersection of Concord Road, Chelsea Road, Foulk Road, and Valley Brook Road in the northern part of the township.

The Chelsea blacksmith shop was the longest continually used blacksmith shop in Delaware County and was reputed to be one of the oldest in the County. A blacksmith had operated from that location since the time of the French and Indian War. The original building was demolished in February 2013 and the operations were moved to a larger facility on Foulk Road. The blacksmith shop is still run by the same owners since the early 1900s, the McKinleys.

== History ==
In 1683, Edward Beazer and Edward Brown had 500 acres surveyed to them in the northeastern corner of Bethel Township. On this land was founded Bethel hamlet, later known as Corner Catch (Ketch) and the village of Chelsea.

In 1777, after the Battle of Brandywine, the British Army passed through Chelsea on Concord Road as they chased the retreating Continental Army toward Chester.
