= Naiman-Beg =

Naiman-Beg (in Polish: Najman Beg or Najman-beg), Tatar prince ("beg" also "knyaz"), ancestor of many Lipka Tatar families.

It is not known what was his real name - the expression "Naiman Beg" is not a name but a title that means "Prince of Naimans". This title implies that he was relative to khan dynasty ruling in Mongol Empire.

It is probable that Naiman Beg was a descendant of Jebe, one of Genghis Khan's chief commanders, that defeated Naimans and incorporated them to the Genghis Khan’s Empire at the beginning of the 13th century. For this deed he was rewarded just with a hereditary title of "Naiman Beg" as it was practiced in Mongol Empire.

Naiman Beg came to the Grand Duchy of Lithuania at the beginning of the 15th century as a member of an excellent fellowship of Tatar nobility under the command of Jalal ad-Din, the future (short-time) khan of the Golden Horde. They came to help the Lithuanian Grand Prince Vytautas the Great in his war against the Teutonic Knights. They took part in the famous Grunwald Battle of July 15, 1410, then most of them settled in Lithuania and served as soldiers organized in troops, called up in need by Lithuanian rulers.

The body of warriors led by Naiman Beg was so large that if gave the beginning to two banners: Naiman and Kongrat Banner (the latter initially was called "Tipir Banner"). Sons of Naiman Beg and later their male descendants were banner holders (commanders) of these units.

When settled at Lithuania Naiman Beg was given great property mostly in Ashmiany county (now in Belarus). It included villages (in Polish spelling, as they were called contemporary): Bohdanowo, Cicin, Dowbuciszki, Kadyszewicze, Kaskiewicze, Kienia, Kryczyn, Mereszlany, Sielce and Starosielce and also the manor-house in the capital Vilnius at the street later called "Tatar Street".

== Hypothesis on the origin of various Polish Surnames ==
It is speculated that he had two sons: Piotr and Kowrat. It is possible that also Olishko that lived at half of the 15th century was his son. The eldest son was possibly Piotr as his descendants constantly took command over Naiman Banner.

Descendants of Piotr gave origin to families of Andrzejewiczs (vel Andrzejewskis), Andrysewiczs, Arsłanowiczs, Cicińskis, Chorumowiczs, Jakubowiczs, Małuszewiczs, Kadyszewiczs, Kasymowiczs, Minbułatowiczs, Mucharemowiczs, Piotrowiczs, Piotrowskis, Sieleckis, Skirmunts, Szeich-Starosielskis and Tomkiewiczs.

Korwat is the ancestor to families of Adzykiczs, Bazarewiczs, Giełwanowskis, Kazkowiczs, Kryczyńskich, Rusins, Sulewiczs, Tokoszs, Ułanowiczs i Zawadzkis.

Oleszko is the progenitor of families of Bołciuks, Obutkos, Oskiewiczs, Radeckis i Stankiewiczs.

== See also ==
- Mirza
- Bey
- Khan
- Beg Khan
- Begzada
