= Booth Farm =

Historic house in Pennsylvania, United States

- U.S. National Register of Historic Places
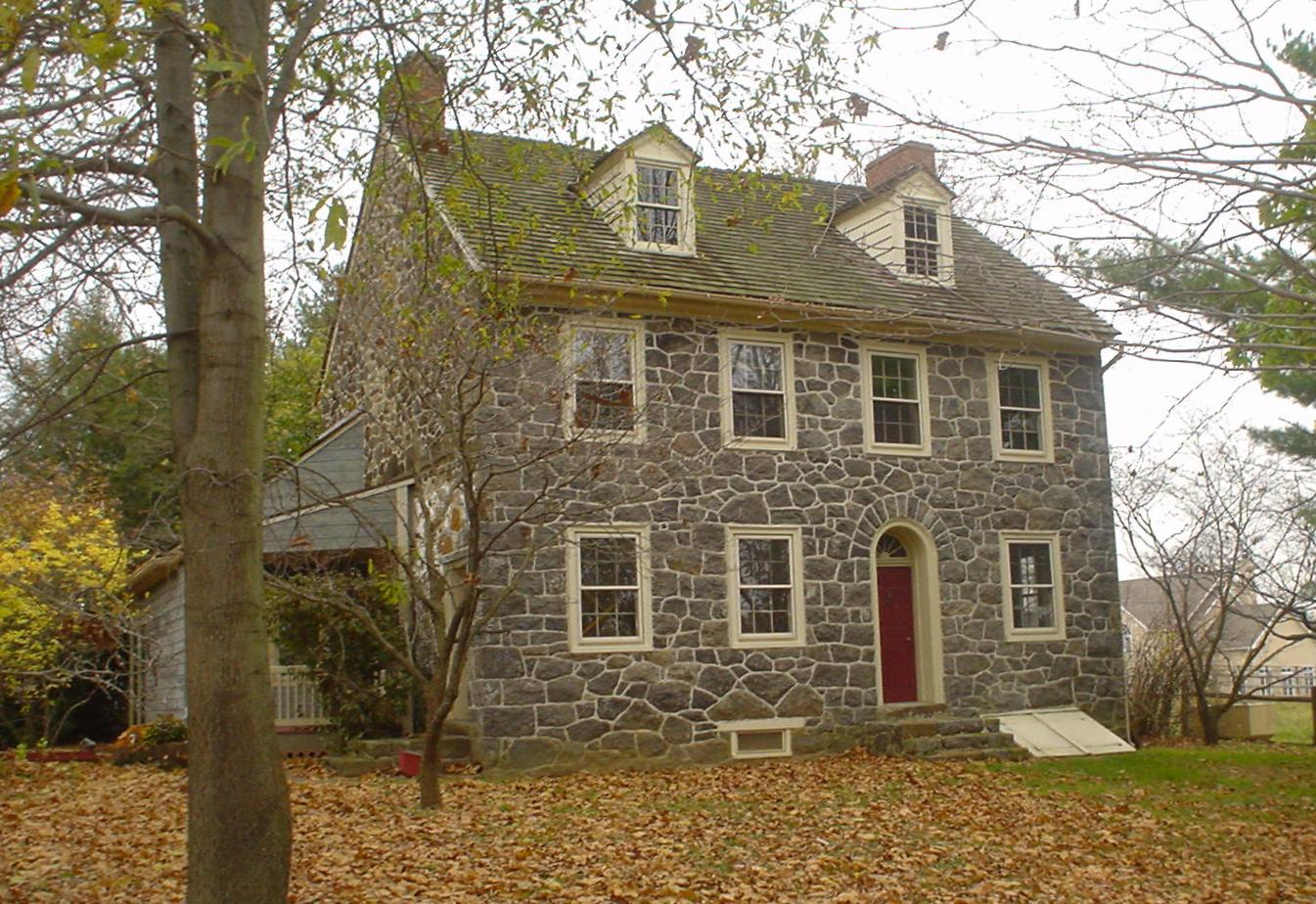
- Booth Farm, November 2009

- Location within Pennsylvania Location within the United States
- Location: 3221 Foulk Rd., Boothwyn, Pennsylvania
- Coordinates: 39°51′15″N 75°29′24″W
- Area: 72 acres (29 ha)
- Built: 1819
- Architectural style: Federal
- NRHP reference No.: 03000527
- Added to NRHP: June 13, 2003

The Booth Farm is a historic farmhouse located in Bethel Township, Delaware County. The farmhouse was built in the Federal style in 1819 and a barn was also built about the same time. The roughly 77 acre farm was bought by Thomas Booth in the 1790s and has been used as a tenant farm throughout much of its history. He built the farmhouse for his son James who was born in 1790. Four following generations, all named Thomas Booth, have owned the farm into the 21st century.

== History ==
Robert Booth immigrated to Pennsylvania from Yorkshire, England in 1712 and established a farm in the neighborhood. His son, also named Robert, was the original Thomas Booth's father. Robert Pyle bought the land in 1683, and his family owned the land until it was sold to the Booths. The Pyle house, which was an important meeting place for Quakers, was destroyed in the 19th century.

The barn was burned down by a tenant farmer and was then re-erected on the same foundation in 1910. A carriage barn was built in two stages in c. 1820 and c. 1830. Several other out-buildings were added at later dates.

The farm was added to the National Register of Historic Places on June 13, 2003.

== See also ==
- National Register of Historic Places listings in Delaware County, Pennsylvania
