= Naman, Iran =

Naman (Persian: نامن or نمان) is a word of Kurdish and Iranian provenance that may refer to:

- Naman, Golestan (نامن - Nāman), village in the Sadan Rostaq-e Sharqi Rural District, in the Central District of Kordkuy County, Golestan Province, Iran
- Naman, Kurdistan (نامن - Namān), village in Howmeh Rural District, in the Central District of Sanandaj County, Kurdistan Province, Iran
- Naman, Razavi Khorasan (نامن - Nāman), village in Bashtin Rural District, Davarzan District, Sabzevar County, Razavi Khorasan Province, Iran

== See also ==
- Naaman, Aramean military commander
