= Bethel Township, Delaware County, Pennsylvania =

Township in Pennsylvania, US

- Township
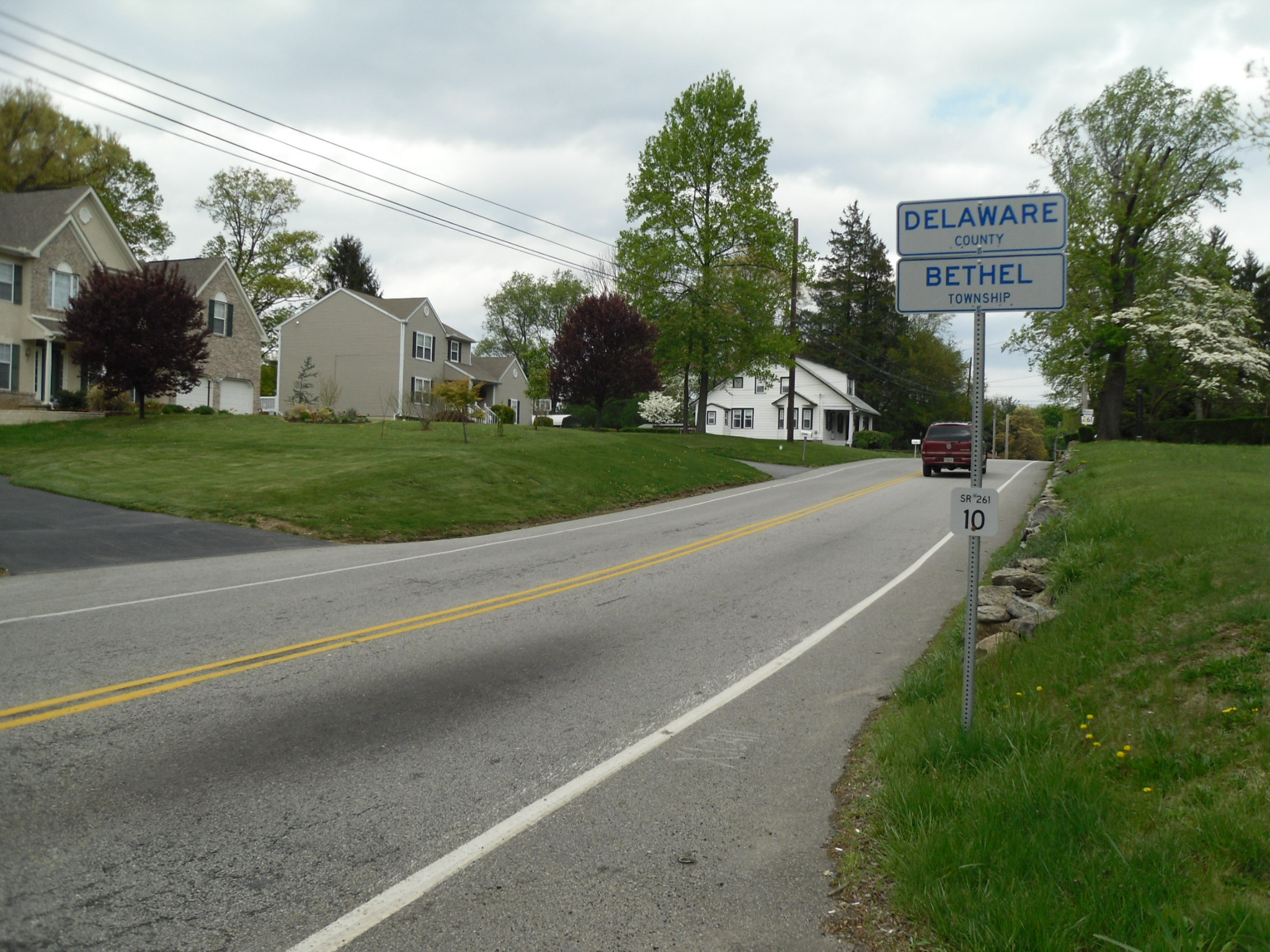
- Entering Bethel Township on Pennsylvania Route 261

- Seal

- Location in Delaware County and the state of Pennsylvania.

- Location of Pennsylvania in the United States
- Coordinates: 39°51′30″N 75°28′07″W
- Country: United States
- State: Pennsylvania
- County: Delaware
- Established: 1683

Area
  - Total: 5.41 sq mi (14.02 km^{2})
  - Land: 5.41 sq mi (14.02 km^{2})
  - Water: 0 sq mi (0.00 km^{2})
- Elevation: 444 ft (135 m)

Population (2020)
  - Total: 9,574
  - Density: 1,769.2/sq mi (683.11/km^{2})
- Time zone: UTC-5 (EST)
  - Summer (DST): UTC-4 (EDT)
- Area code: 610
- FIPS code: 42-045-06024
- Website: www.betheltwp.com

Bethel Township is a township in Delaware County, Pennsylvania, United States. It contains the two unincorporated communities of Booth's Corner and Chelsea. The population was 9,574 at the 2020 census.

== History ==
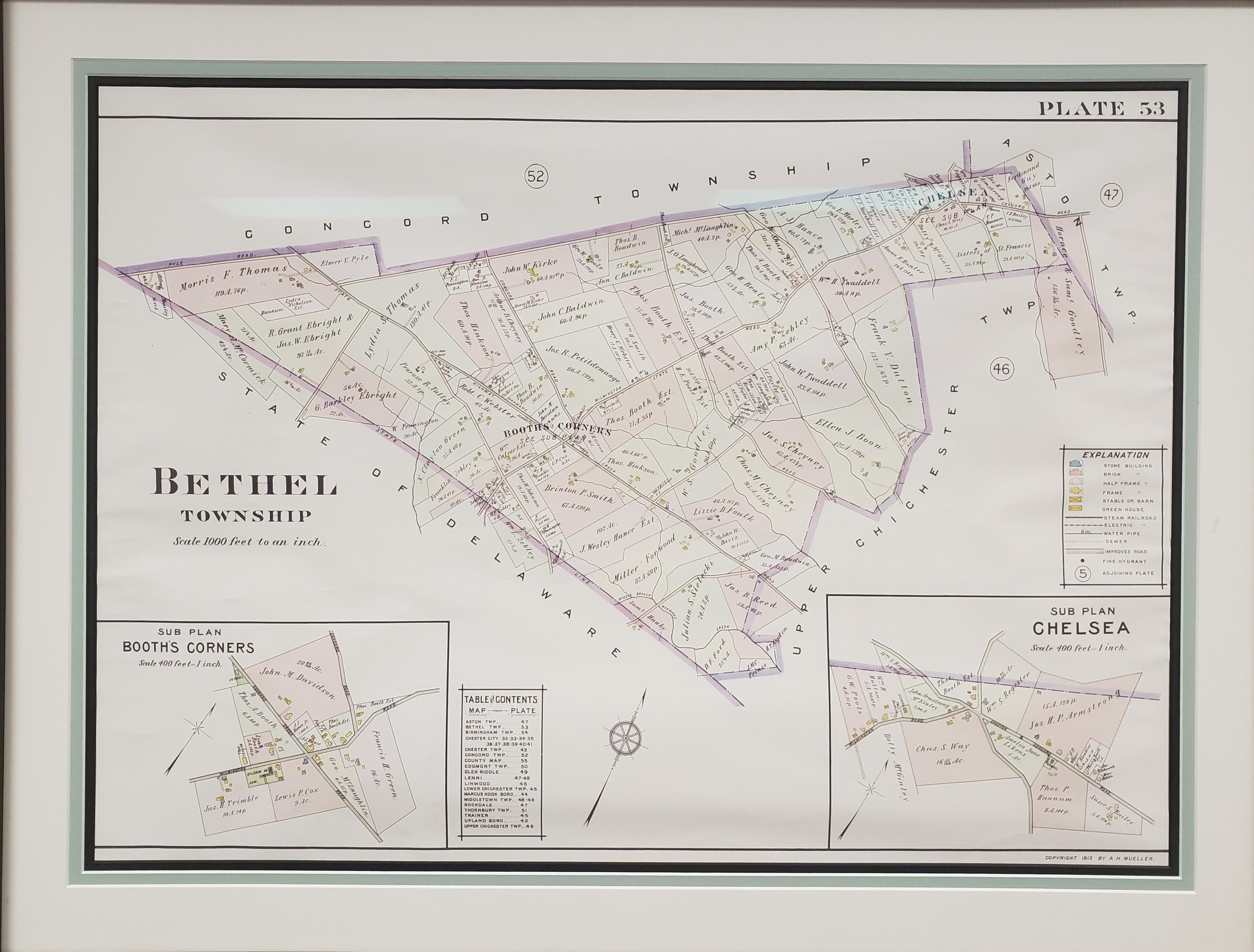
Bethel Township Map showing early landowners

Bethel Township was the smallest of all the original townships of Chester County. The township is mentioned as early as 1683, and means "House of God". In 1683, Edward Beazer and Edward Brown had 500 acres surveyed to them in the northeasterly end of the township. On this tract, Bethel hamlet, afterwards known as Corner Catch (Ketch), is the location of the current village of Chelsea. In 1686, the road now known as Bethel Road was laid out from Bethel to Chichester (Marcus Hook).

The settlers of Bethel Township were among the earliest settlers of the Pennsylvania Colony, and many were members of the Religious Society of Friends, or "Quakers". The list of taxables for Bethel township in 1693, shows nine tax payers: John Gibbons, Ralph Pyle, John Bushel, Nicholas Pyle, Edward Beazer, Robert Eyre, Thomas Garrett, John Howard, Thomas Cooper. In 1715, the list had doubled to include: Robert Pyle, John Grist, Robert Booth, Edward Beazer, John Canady, Benjamin Moulder, Joseph Pyle, John Hickman, Edward Griffith, John Hopton, John Gibbons, and Thomas Durnell. Robert Pyle, a leader of the Society of Friends, was almost continuously a member of the Pennsylvania Provincial Assembly from 1688 until 1705.

In 1759, residents of Bethel Township paid "a bounty" of ten pounds "in behalf of the township" along with a wagon and supplies of oats and flour to General John Forbes based on his request to Chester and other counties in the province to support an army about to march to Fort Duquesne under his command.

In 1777, after the Battle of Brandywine, the British Army passed through Bethel Township on Old Concord Road as they chased the retreating Continental Army toward Chester and encamped at nearby Birmingham and Aston. Residents of Bethel were "annoyed and plundered" by the British army and many residents were left entirely without food.

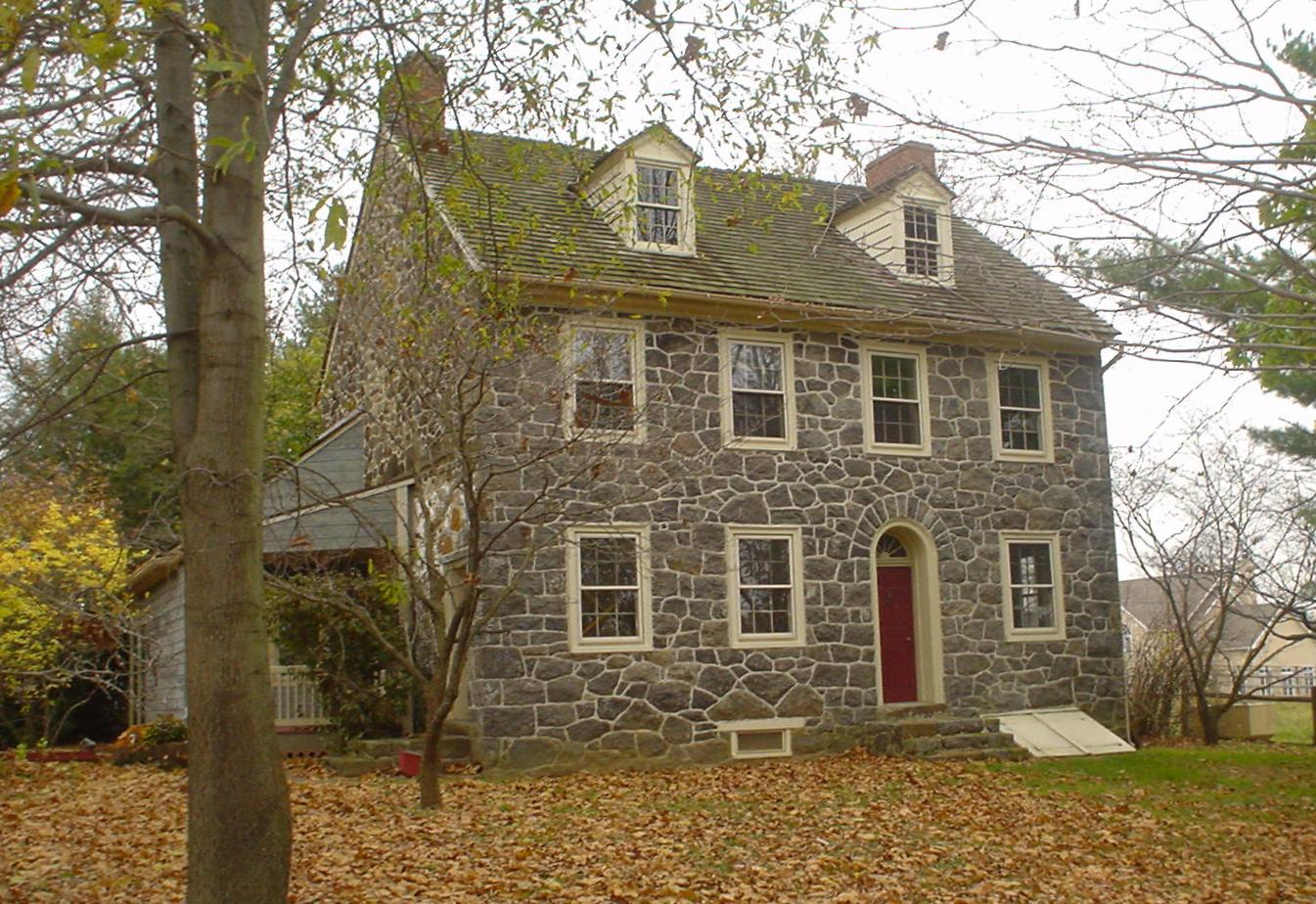
The Booth Farm built in 1819 is listed on the National Register of Historic Places.

On September 26, 1789, Bethel Township became part of Delaware County as it was established by separating from the eastern portion of Chester County.

The Siloam United Methodist Church in Bethel was founded in 1852 and is the only church in Bethel Township.

Garnet mines were established in Bethel township by Herman Behr & Co. of New York in 1879. The mine operated until 1912. The garnet mine gave rise to the regional name of Garnet Valley.

The Booth Farm built in 1819 is listed on the National Register of Historic Places.

== Government ==
Bethel township is governed by a Board of Supervisors. By referendum, the board was increased from three to five members in 2011. Currently, terms of office are staggered. Beginning in 2017, all members have served terms of six years.

The Bethel Police Department is appointed by the Board of Supervisors. The management team consists of chief, sergeant, detective and are supported by approximately 15 patrol officers. They are the only Police Department in Delaware County that are not full-time police.

Bethel Township is part of the Pennsylvania 5th Congressional District, represented by Rep. Mary Gay Scanlon, the Pennsylvania House of Representatives, District 160, represented by Wendell Craig Williams and the Pennsylvania Senate, District 9, represented by John I. Kane.

== Geography ==
The township is located in the Southwest corner of Delaware County on the summit between the Delaware River and Brandywine Creek. The township is approximately 3 miles in length and 1.5 miles in width at the widest point. According to the United States Census Bureau, the township has a total area of 5.4 square miles (14 km^{2}), all land.

Waterways in Bethel Township include the southern branch of Naaman's Creek, Green Creek and Spring Run.

Bethel is bordered by Concord Township to the West, Aston Township to the North, Upper Chichester Township to the East and the State of Delaware to the South.

The southern border of Bethel is part of the Twelve-Mile Circle, the circular boundary between Delaware and Pennsylvania which dates back to 1681.

== Demographics ==
Historical population
Census	Pop.	Note	%±
1790	222		—
1800	240		8.1%
1930	864		—
1940	1,089		26.0%
1950	1,283		17.8%
1960	1,834		42.9%
1970	2,034		10.9%
1980	2,438		19.9%
1990	3,330		36.6%
2000	6,421		92.8%
2010	8,791		36.9%
2020	9,574		8.9%

As of Census 2010, the racial makeup of the township was 90.3% White, 1.8% African American, 0.2% Native American, 6.1% Asian, 0.4% from other races, and 1.2% from two or more races. Hispanic or Latino of any race were 2.2% of the population .

As of the census of 2000, there were 6,421 people, 1,984 households, and 1,732 families residing in the township. The population density was 1,132.3 inhabitants per square mile (437.2/km^{2}). There were 2,017 housing units at an average density of 355.7 per square mile (137.3/km^{2}). The racial makeup of the township was 94.44% White, 2.18% African American, 0.03% Native American, 2.41% Asian, 0.02% Pacific Islander, 0.33% from other races, and 0.59% from two or more races. Hispanic or Latino of any race were 1.93% of the population.

There were 1,984 households, out of which 50.9% had children under the age of 18 living with them, 78.3% were married couples living together, 6.3% had a female householder with no husband present, and 12.7% were non-families. 9.6% of all households were made up of individuals, and 3.4% had someone living alone who was 65 years of age or older. The average household size was 3.16 and the average family size was 3.40.

In the township the population was spread out, with 31.5% under the age of 18, 5.1% from 18 to 24, 34.7% from 25 to 44, 20.2% from 45 to 64, and 8.4% who were 65 years of age or older. The median age was 36 years. For every 100 females, there were 99.4 males. For every 100 females age 18 and over, there were 95.7 males.

The median income for a household in the township was $84,661, and the median income for a family was $87,248. Males had a median income of $60,496 versus $36,272 for females. The per capita income for the township was $29,349. About 1.0% of families and 2.4% of the population were below the poverty line, including 1.4% of those under age 18 and 4.4% of those age 65 or over.

== Education ==
Bethel Township is part of the Garnet Valley School District. Bethel Springs Elementary School is the only school residing in Bethel Township. It was opened on September 4, 2002, for grades 1–5.

Garnet Valley Middle School serves students in grades 6–8, and Garnet Valley High School serves students in grades 9-12.

Rachel Kohl Library serves Bethel Township.

=== History of education ===
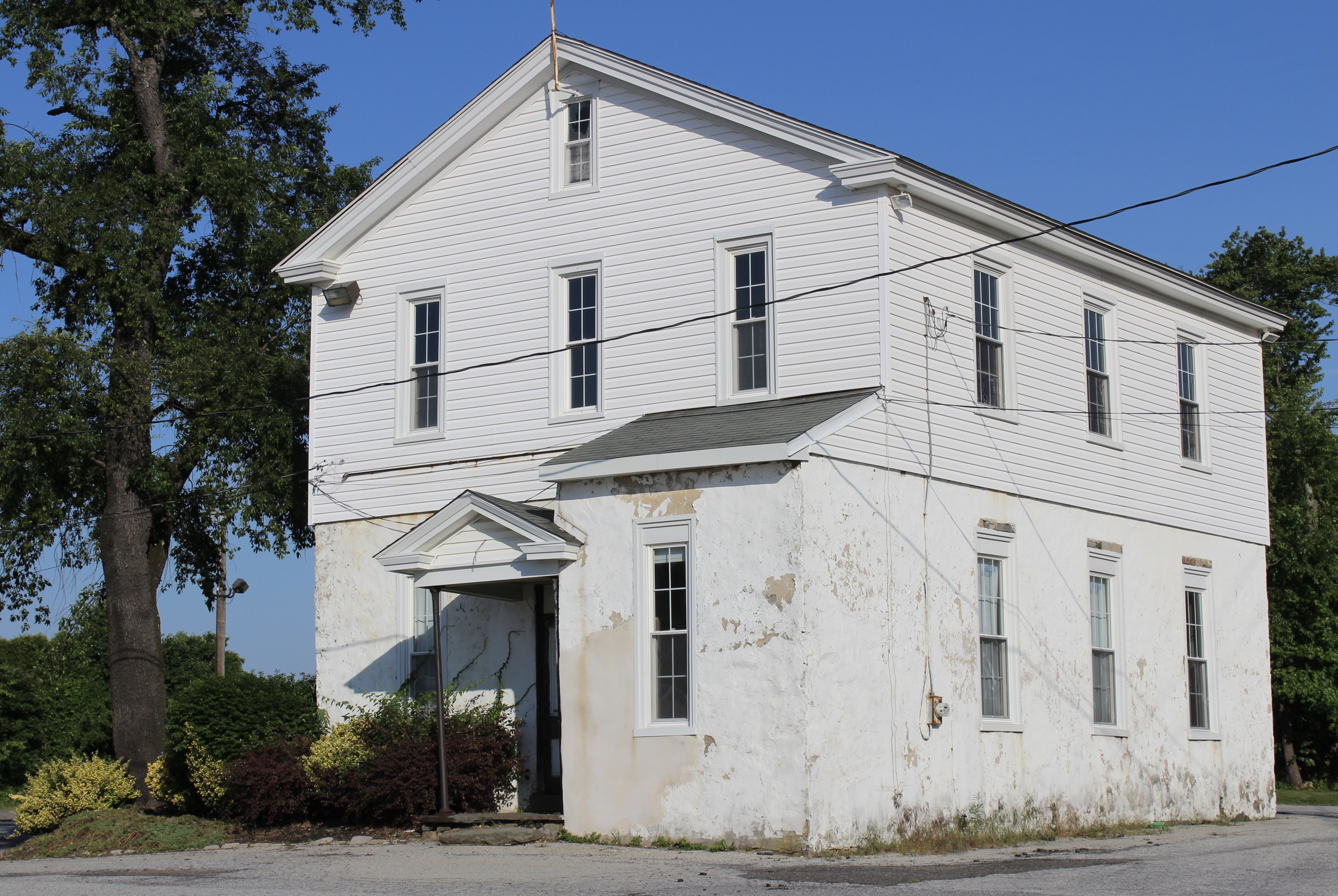
School No. 2 and No. 4 in Bethel Township, Delaware County, Pennsylvania

The first school built in Bethel was in 1780 on the corner of Kirk and Foulk Road. In 1824, a school opened on a lot on Bethel Road East of Booth's Corner and was later known as public school No. 1.

In 1834, the Pennsylvania Public School Act was passed by the General Assembly of the Commonwealth. The law required that every township, borough and city in the state provide a school for its children. Since Bethel Township already had a subscription school, the school was converted into a public school. The first school inspectors appointed for Bethel were Robert McCall and John Larkin.

In 1839, a one-story octagonal school house was built at Booth's Corner and used for several years until destroyed by fire. In 1870, the school was replaced with a one-story structure was built and named School No. 2. A second story was added in 1898. The second floor was designated School No. 4 and used as student population necessitated. The building was sold on September 2, 1953, to Brigg's Auction.

School No. 3 was built in 1860 on Bethel Road west of the village of Chelsea.

The first non-single room school in Bethel Township, Francis Harvey Green School, was dedicated on November 9, 1951. The school was demolished in 2010.

On July 1, 1964, Bethel agreed to join with Concord and Chester Heights Borough to form the Garnet Valley School District. On June 9, 1969, the Bethel Township School Board was dissolved.

== Transportation ==
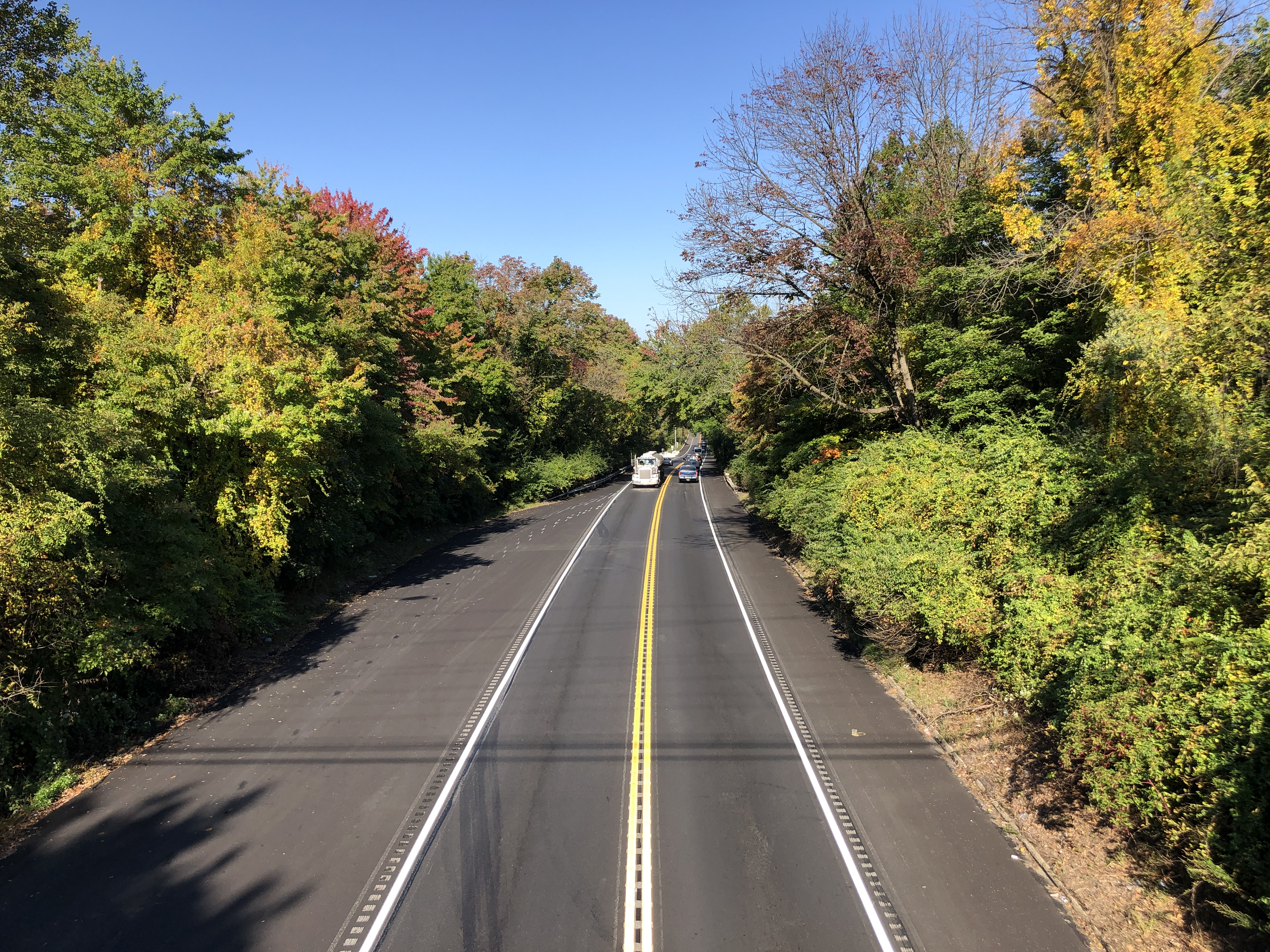
US 322 westbound in Bethel Township

As of 2020, there were 42.57 miles (68.51 km) of public roads in Bethel Township, of which 15.35 miles (24.70 km) were maintained by Pennsylvania Department of Transportation (PennDOT) and 27.22 miles (43.81 km) were maintained by the township.

U.S. Route 322 is the most prominent highway serving Bethel Township. It follows Conchester Highway along a northwest-to-southeast alignment across the northeastern portion of the township. Other numbered highways serving the township include U.S. Route 202, Pennsylvania Route 261 and Pennsylvania Route 491. US 202 follows the Wilmington-West Chester Pike through the far southwestern corner of the township. PA 261 follows Foulk Road southwestward from US 322 through the middle of the township to the Delaware state line. Finally, PA 491 follows Naamans Creek Road along a northwest-southeast alignment across the southern portion of the township.

== Notable people ==
- John M. Clayton - member of Arkansas House of Representatives and Arkansas Senate, U.S. Congressman-elect for Arkansas assassinated during his challenge to the election

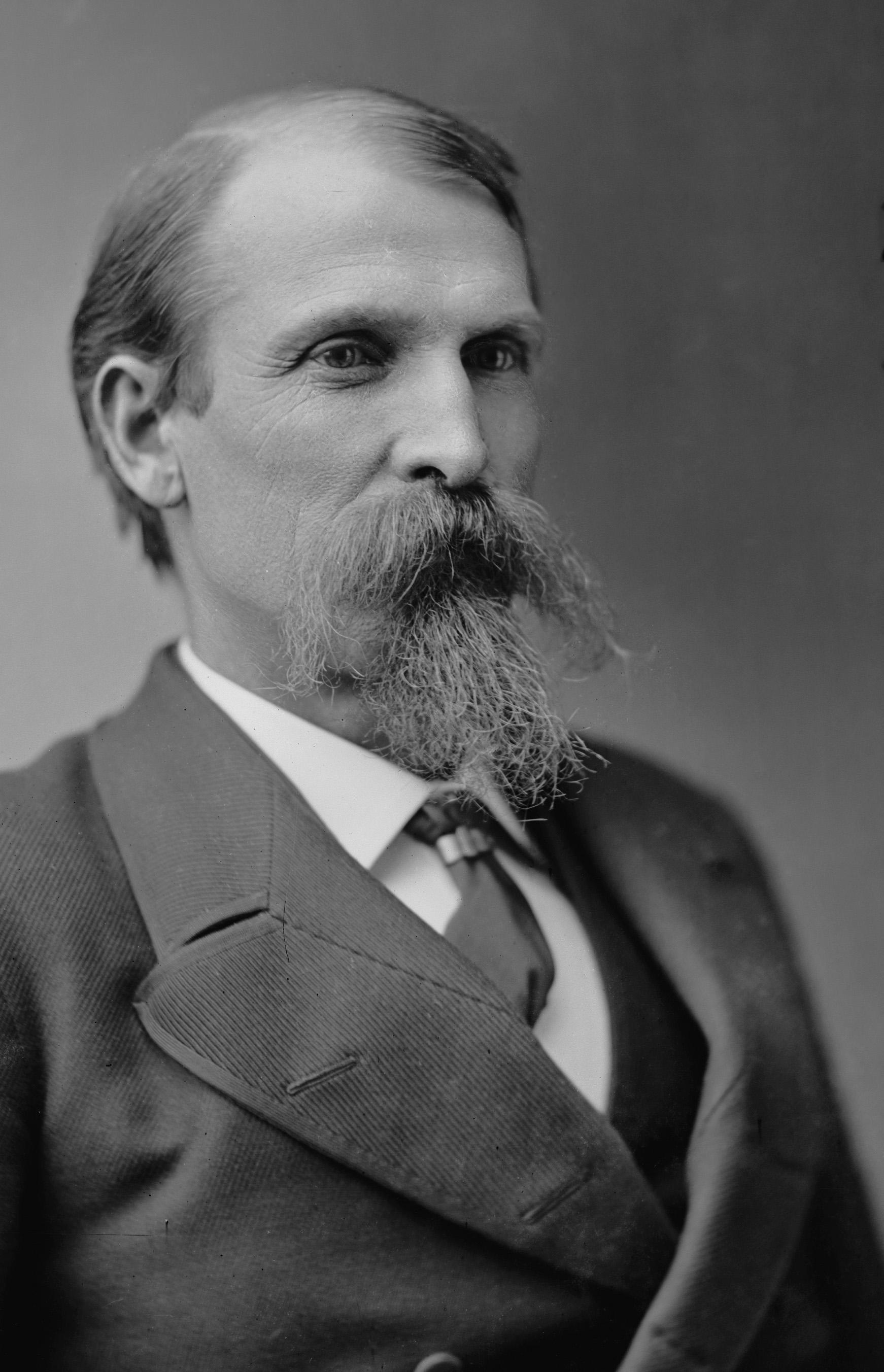
Powell Clayton, born in Bethel Township, was a Union Army Brigadier General, 9th Governor of Arkansas, U.S. Senator from Arkansas and the 1st U.S. Ambassador to Mexico

- Powell Clayton - Union Army Brigadier General, ninth Governor of Arkansas, U.S. Senator from Arkansas, first U.S. Ambassador to Mexico
- Thomas J. Clayton - President Judge of the Thirty-second Judicial District of Pennsylvania
- W. H. H. Clayton - lawyer and judge in post Civil War Arkansas, U.S. Attorney for the United States District Court for the Western District of Arkansas, chief prosecutor of "hanging judge" Isaac C. Parker
- Francis Harvey Green - educator, poet and lecturer
- Bill Haley - rock and roll musician
