= Route 261 (Delaware–Pennsylvania) =

Highway in Delaware and Pennsylvania

Route 261
- Foulk Road

Route information
- Maintained by DelDOT and PennDOT
- Length: 6.63 mi (10.67 km) DE 261: 4.37 mi (7.03 km); PA 261: 2.260 mi (3.637 km)
- Existed: 1928–present
- History: PA 261 designated in 1928, DE 261 designated by 1938

Major junctions
- South end: DE 141 near Fairfax, DE
- US 202 near Fairfax, DE; DE 92 in Ways Corner, DE; PA 491 in Booths Corner, PA
- North end: US 322 in Bethel Township, PA

Location
- Country: United States
- State: Delaware
- Counties: DE: New Castle; PA: Delaware

Highway system
- Delaware State Route System; List; Byways
- Pennsylvania State Route System; Interstate; US; State; Scenic; Legislative
← DE 202	DE 261	→ DE 273
← PA 260	PA 261	→ PA 262

Delaware Route 261 (DE 261) and Pennsylvania Route 261 (PA 261), also known as Foulk Road, is a 6.63-mile (10.67 km) state highway running through Delaware and Pennsylvania. DE 261 runs 4.37 miles (7.03 km) through New Castle County, Delaware from DE 141 and an interchange with U.S. Route 202 (US 202) north of Interstate 95 (I-95) near Fairfax, Delaware, a community north of Wilmington, northeast to the Pennsylvania state line. The road runs through suburban areas of Brandywine Hundred as a four-lane road south of DE 92 and a two-lane road north of DE 92. At the Pennsylvania state line, Foulk Road becomes PA 261 and continues 2.26 miles (3.64 km) through Bethel Township in Delaware County, intersecting PA 491 in Booths Corner before ending at two intersections with access roads to US 322.

DE 261 was originally designated along Foulk Road in the 1930s. In the 1960s, most of the route was widened into a four-lane road. The southern terminus at US 202 was reconstructed into an interchange in the 2000s. PA 261 was first designated in 1928 along Foulk Road between the Delaware state line and PA 61 and PA 161 in Chelsea. The route was extended north along Valley Brook Road to US 1 in Chester Heights by 1940. The northern terminus of PA 261 was moved to its current location by 1980.

== Route description ==
=== Delaware ===
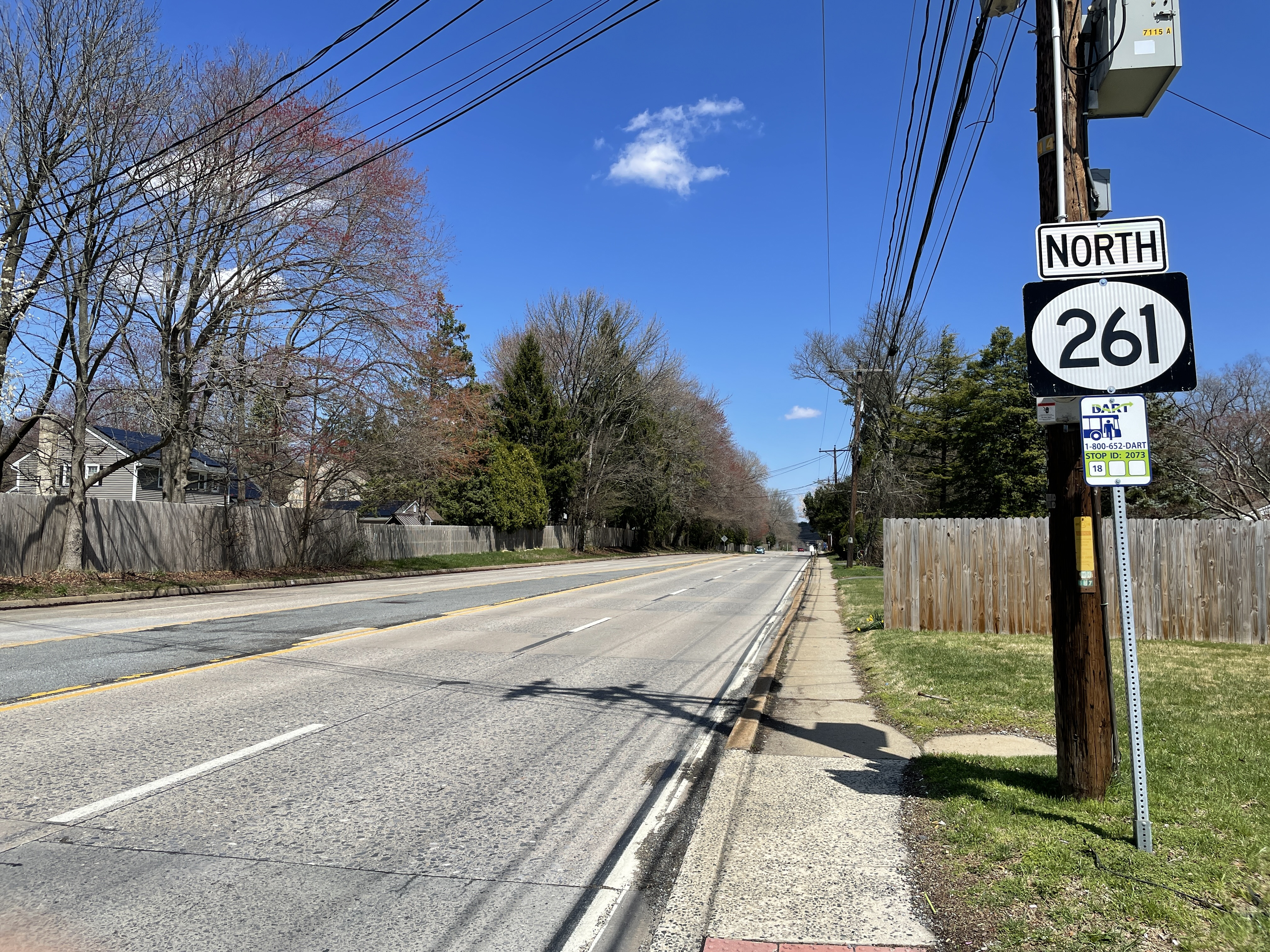
DE 261 northbound past Grubb Road north of Wilmington

DE 261 begins at an interchange with US 202 and the northern terminus of DE 141 north of Alapocas Run State Park and south of Fairfax in Blue Ball, heading northeast on four-lane divided Foulk Road. The route runs near business parks, becoming an undivided road. The road continues through the suburban Brandywine Hundred area, passing residences along with a few businesses. DE 261 remains a four-lane undivided road through this area, occasionally widening into a divided highway at intersections. The route intersects several roads including Murphy Road/Wilson Road, Shipley Road, Silverside Road, and Grubb Road. Between Shipley and Silverside roads, the road crosses Shellpot Creek and passes to the northwest of Brandywine High School. Farther northeast, DE 261 comes to an intersection with DE 92 in Ways Corner, at which point it turns north and becomes a two-lane undivided road that passes more homes. The route ends at the Pennsylvania state line.

DE 261 has an annual average daily traffic count ranging from a high of 18,748 vehicles at the Weldin Road intersection to a low of 10,358 vehicles at the Pennsylvania state line.

=== Pennsylvania ===
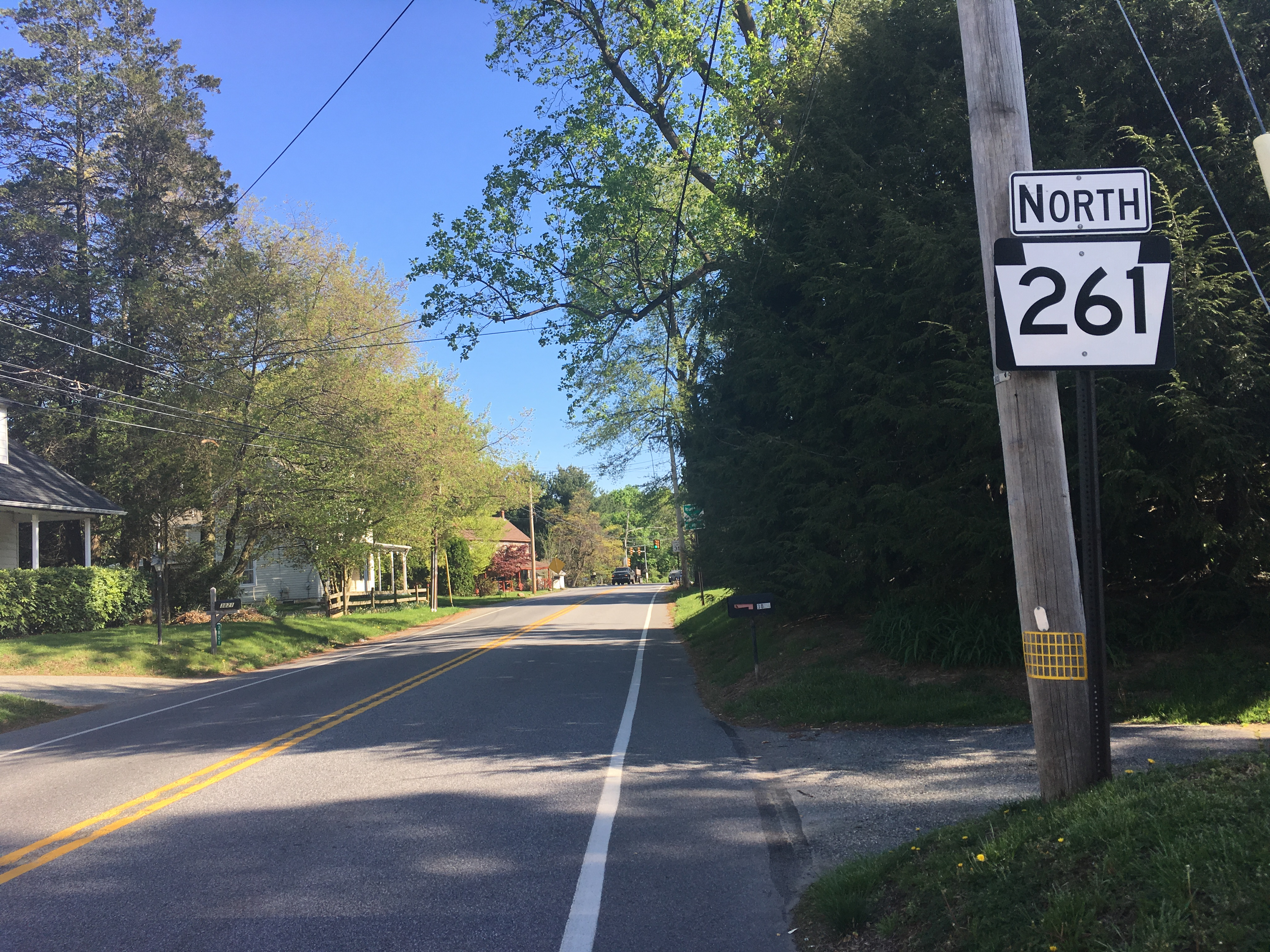
PA 261 northbound past its southern terminus at DE 261 at the Delaware state line in Bethel Township

PA 261 begins at the Delaware state line and continues northeast on two-lane undivided Foulk Road through Bethel Township in Delaware County, passing through residential areas as it crosses Zebley Road in the community of Zebleys Corner. In the community of Booths Corner, PA 261 intersects PA 491, at which point the road passes a few businesses. North of this intersection, the road runs between a tank farm to the west and Bethel Springs Elementary School to the east prior to crossing Bethel Road and entering wooded residential neighborhoods. PA 261 intersectsn with State Route 3038, signed as Garnet Mine Road, which provides access to and from US 322 westbound. After crossing an overpass over US 322, PA 261 reaches its northern terminus at an intersection with State Route 3029, which provides access to and from US 322 eastbound. Foulk Road continues northeast as State Route 3029, an unsigned quadrant route, to an intersection with Concord Road just west of that road's junction with Valleybrook Road/Chelsea Road in the community of Chelsea.

PA 261 has an annual average daily traffic count ranging from a high of 9,400 vehicles between the Delaware state line and PA 491 to a low of 7,200 vehicles between the Bethel Road intersection and US 322.

== History ==
=== Delaware ===
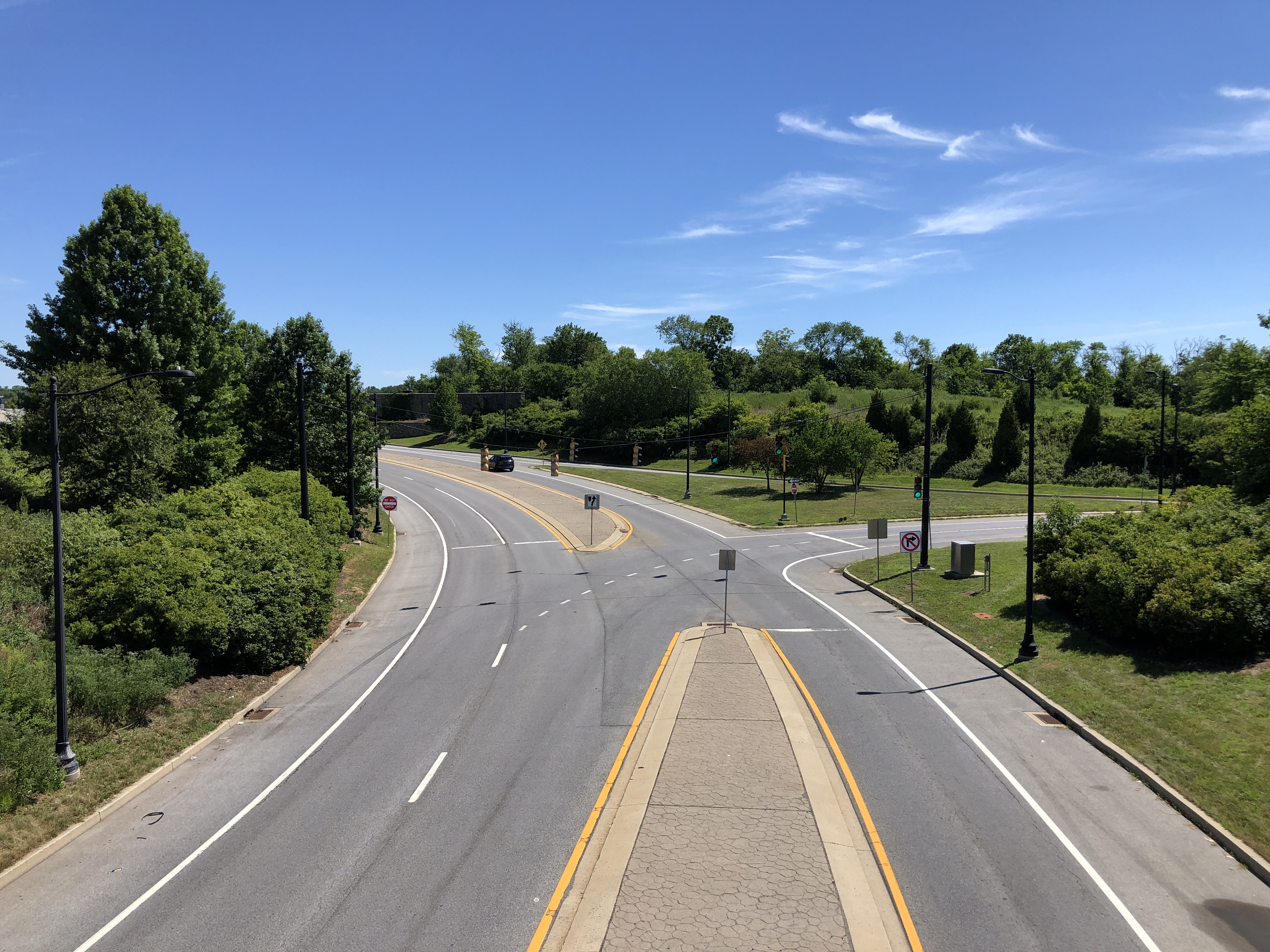
DE 261 northbound at its southern terminus at US 202 and DE 141 in Blue Ball

By 1920, what is now DE 261 existed as a county road. When Delaware first assigned state highway numbers by 1936, what is now DE 261 had been upgraded to a state highway, but did not receive a number at that time. By 1938, DE 261 was designated onto its current alignment between US 202 and the Pennsylvania state line, continuing the PA 261 designation. DE 261 was widened into a four-lane road between US 202 and Silverside Road by 1966. The four-lane portion was extended north to Naamans Road a year later. In the middle part of 2007, construction on converting the intersection with US 202 into interchange was completed as part of the Blue Ball Properties project, a project undertaken to improve roads in this area as part of AstraZeneca locating their North American headquarters to the area. DE 141 was also realigned to intersect US 202 and DE 261 at this interchange. The total cost of the project was $123 million.

=== Pennsylvania ===
When Pennsylvania first legislated its highways in 1911, what would become PA 261 was legislated as part of Legislative Route 180 between the Delaware state line and Chelsea. PA 261 was first designated in 1928 to run from the Delaware state line to PA 61 (Concord Road) and PA 161 (Chelsea Road) in Chelsea, following Foulk Road. By 1940, PA 261 was extended north along Valleybrook Road from US 322 (which replaced PA 61) to US 1 in Chester Heights. By 1980, the northern terminus of PA 261 was truncated to its current location at the interchange with US 322.

== Major intersections ==
State	County	Location	mi	km	Destinations	Notes
Delaware	New Castle	Blue Ball	0.00	0.00	DE 141 south	Continuation south
Delaware	New Castle	Blue Ball	0.00	0.00	US 202 south to I-95	Interchange
Delaware	New Castle	Ways Corner	3.79	6.10	DE 92 (Naamans Road)	
Delaware–Pennsylvania state line			4.37 0.000	7.03 0.000	DE 261 becomes PA 261	
Pennsylvania	Delaware	Bethel Township	0.509	0.819	PA 491 (Naamans Creek Road)	
Pennsylvania	Delaware	Bethel Township	2.260	3.637	US 322 – Concordville, Chester	Eastbound access via SR 3038 (Garnet Mine Road), westbound access via SR 3029; northern terminus
1.000 mi = 1.609 km; 1.000 km = 0.621 mi
