= Robert J. Naiman =

American academic

Robert J. Naiman (born 31 July 1947) is a professor in both the School of Aquatic and Fishery Sciences and the College of Forest Resources at the University of Washington in Seattle. He also holds the UNESCO Chair in Sustainable Rivers at the University of Washington. Naiman was designated Eminent Ecologist by the Ecological Society of America in 2012.

Naiman is best known for his work on the ecology of rivers and riparian areas. His work to understand the biogeochemical cycling and role of animals in altering river and riparian systems have been particularly influential. Naiman started researching the Queets River in Washington state in 1992 and has since been nicknamed "Dr. Queets" by the Seattle press from his continuing research on that river.

He was elected a Fellow of the Ecological Society of America in 2014.

== Education ==
Bachelor of Science, Zoology, 1969, California State Polytechnic University
Master of Arts, Zoology and Ichthyology, 1971, University of California, Los Angeles
Doctor of Philosophy, Zoology and Ecosystem Science, 1974, Arizona State University
Honorary Doctor of Philosophy, Université Paul Sabatier (Toulouse, France)

== Key appointments ==
UNESCO Chair in Sustainable Rivers
Coastal Rivers Research Consortium (CRRC)

- Chair, Organizing Committee

DIVERSITAS International (Paris, France)

- Chair, FreshwaterBIODIVERSITY
- Member, Scientific Advisory Committee
- Member, U.S. National Committee

UNESCO International Hydrology Programme (Paris, France)

- Chair, IHP/MAB Ecohydrology Programme

Robert W. Woodruff Foundation - J.W. Jones Ecological Research Center

- Scientific Advisor

Global Water System Project (GWSP; Bonn, Germany)

- Member, Executive Committee
- Member, Scientific Advisory Committee
