= Robert Naiman (activist) =

Robert Naiman is an American policy analyst, researcher, writer, and activist. He is formerly the policy director at Just Foreign Policy, and was formerly on the board of directors at progressive news organization Truthout. He has master's degrees in economics and mathematics from the University of Illinois.

Naiman is a frequent commentator on the Middle East. He has worked as a policy analyst and researcher at the Center for Economic and Policy Research and the Public Citizen's Global Trade Watch. He has studied and worked in the Middle East, where he has participated in actions "for the legitimate rights of the Palestinian people" and "against injustice," such as the 2011 attempt to break Israel's blockade of Gaza.

Naiman's writings and policy positions have received criticism from both supporters and opponents of Israeli policy towards the Palestinians.
