= Forwood Preserve =

Preserve

- Interactive map of Forwood Preserve
- Location: New Castle, Delaware, United States
- Nearest city: Claymont
- Coordinates: 39°47′56″N 75°30′14″W
- Area: 11 acres (4.5 ha)
- Average elevation: 310 ft (94 m)
- Max. elevation: 340 ft (100 m)
- Min. elevation: 300 ft (91 m)
- Named for: Forwood Family

Forwood Preserve is a nature preserve in northern Delaware near Lynnfield, Delaware. It includes old growth forest, and contains a branch of Stoney Creek called Fox Run. It is 11 acres large, and is surrounded by mostly suburban development. It has one connection to Carcroft Crest Park near Stony Run Drive.

The Forwoods were a prominent family that settled in Delaware. The preserve property was slated for development until neighbors rallied to save it in 1968.

The preserve has lots of mature trees with a mixture of deciduous and evergreen trees. Some tree species include eastern white pine, Norway spruce, American holly, eastern hemlock, pitch pine, eastern red cedar, red maple, white oak, northern red oak, swamp oak, American beech, American sycamore, and river birch.

== History ==
The property has a long history and was formerly known as the Allen Tract. The Friends of Forwood Preserve is an organization working to preserve and protect the area.

== Pictures ==
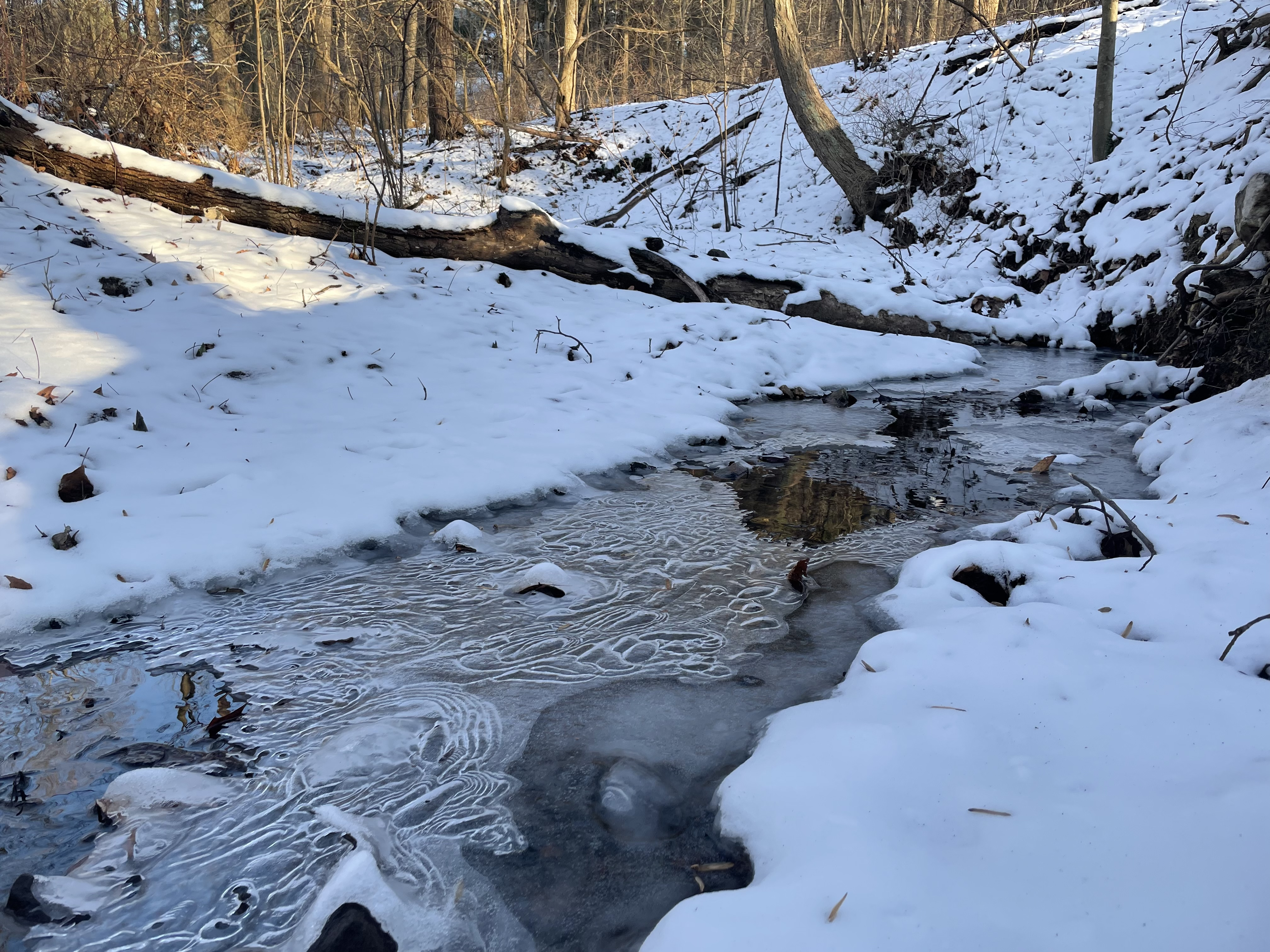
Fox Run In Forwood Preserve in Winter

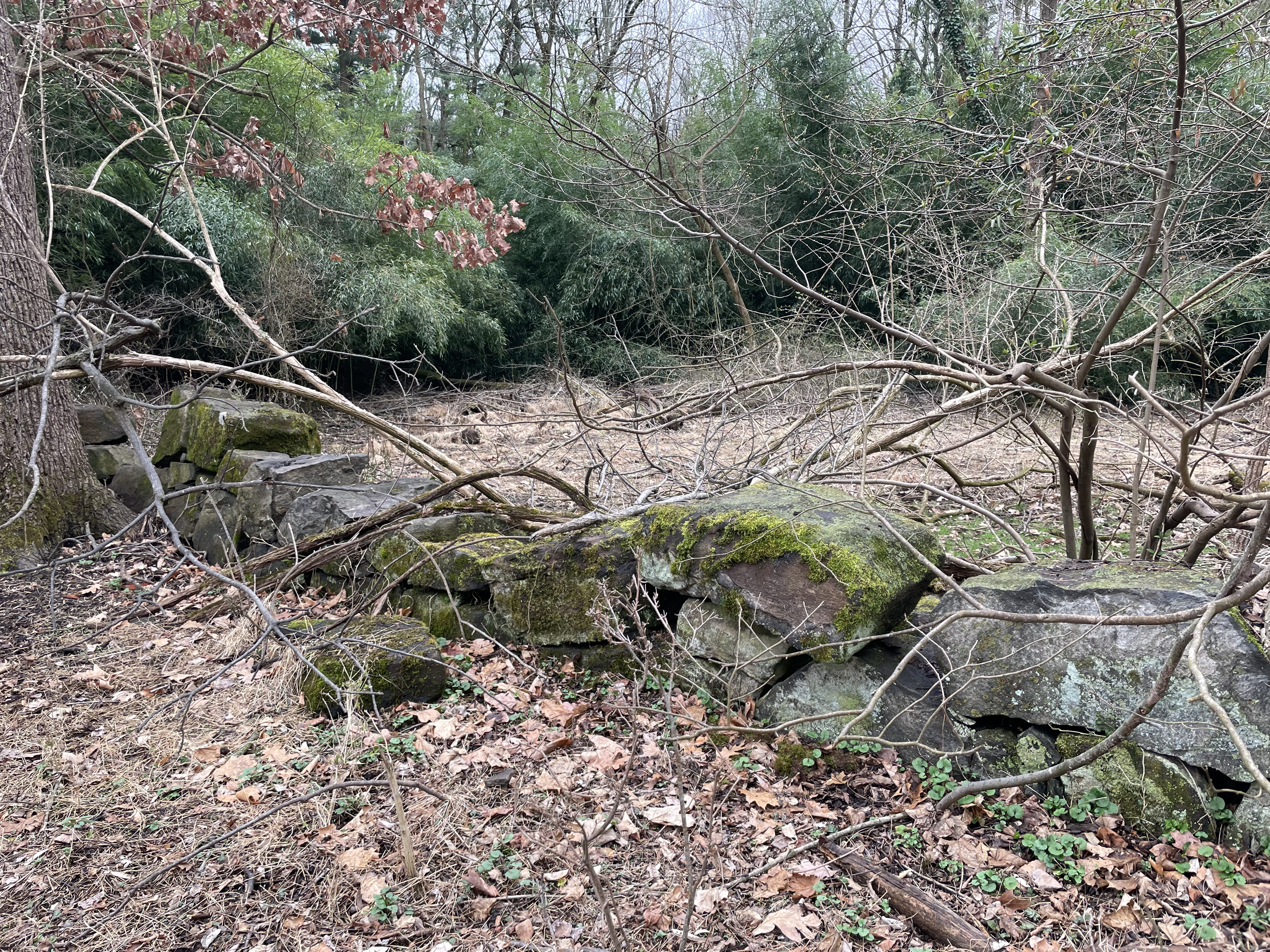
Rock Walls in Forwood Preserve

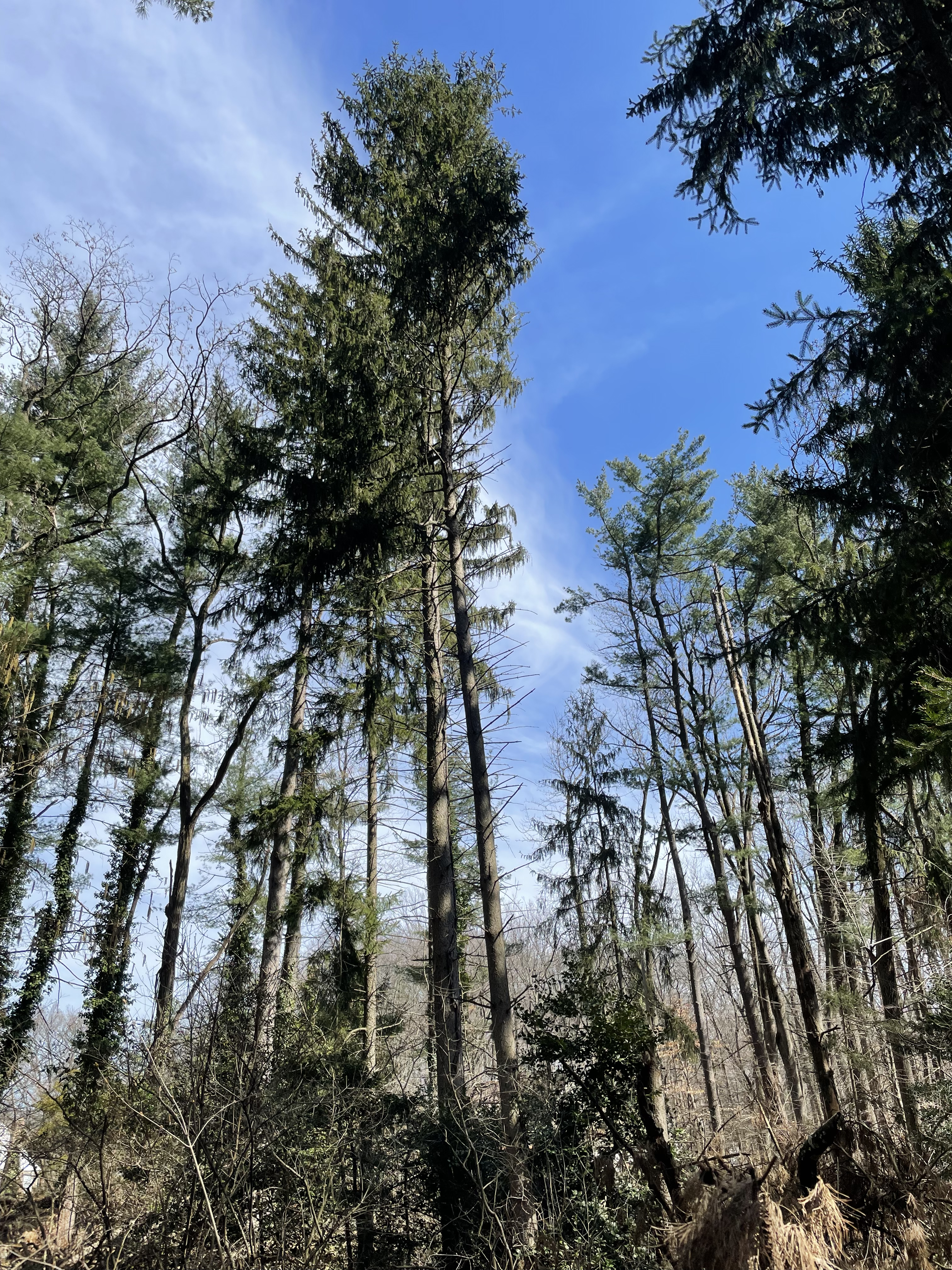
Evergreen Trees in Forwood Preserve

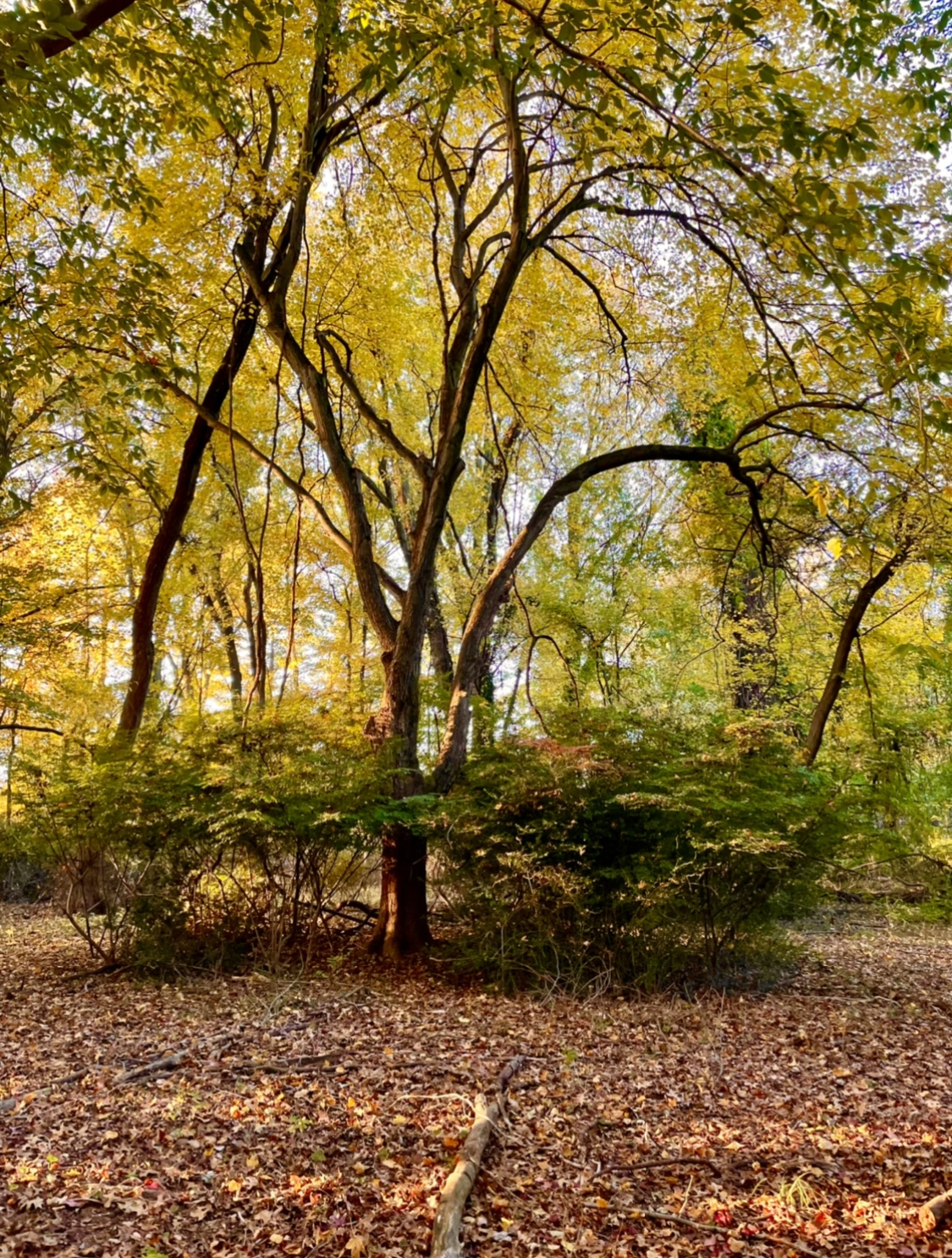
Forwood Preserve in Delaware In November

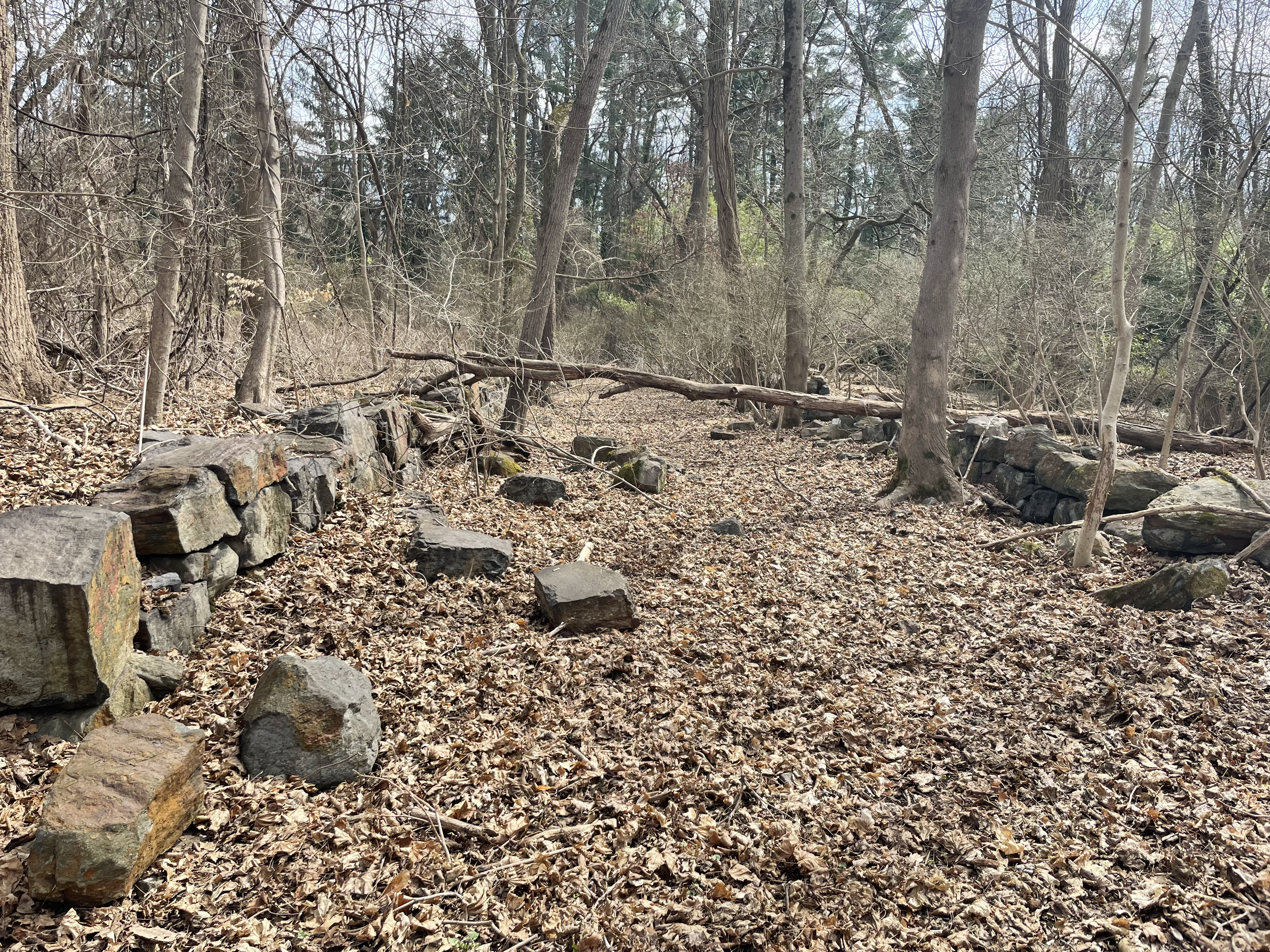
Rock Walls in Forwood Preserve

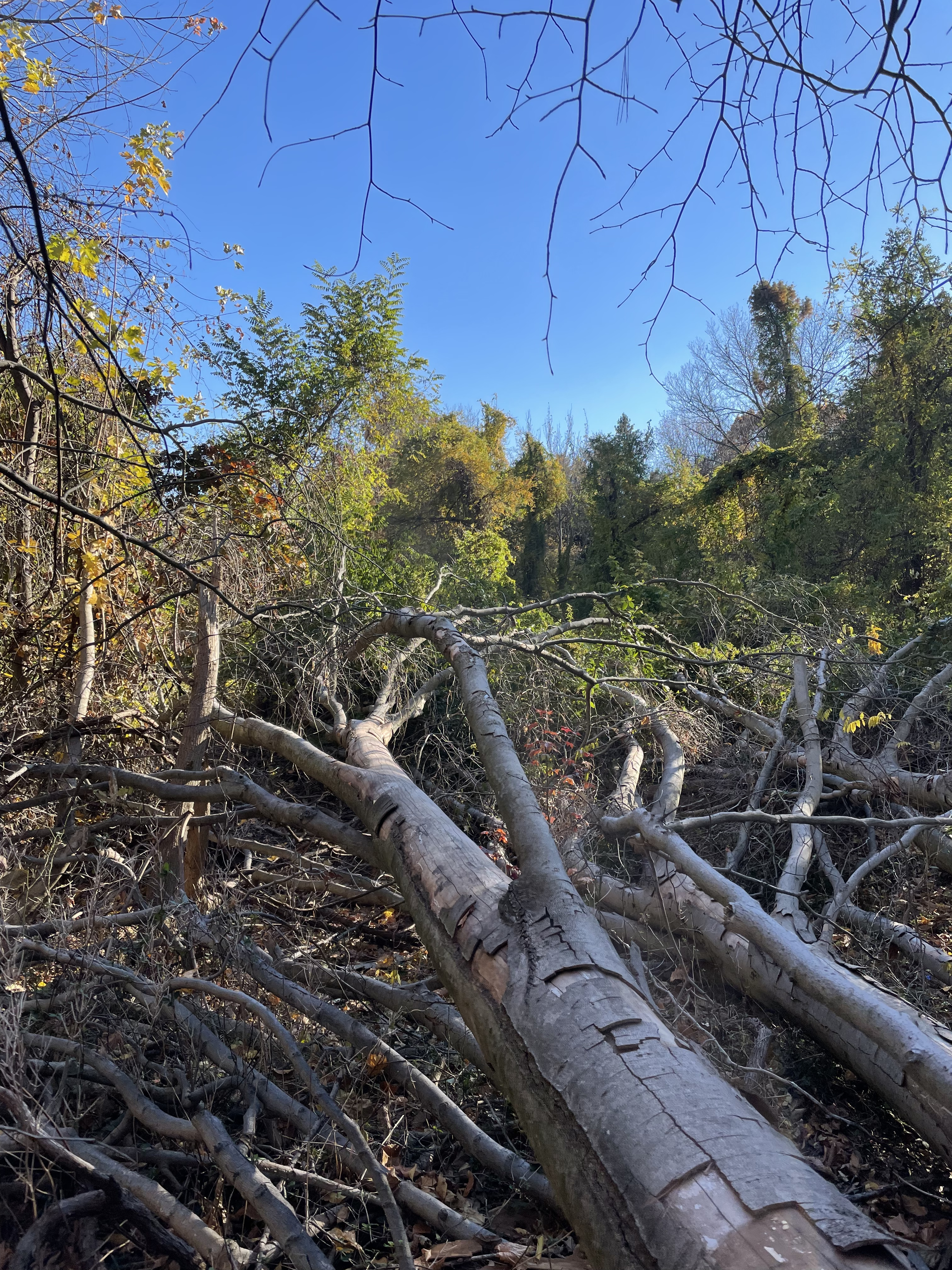
Trees in Forwood Preserve

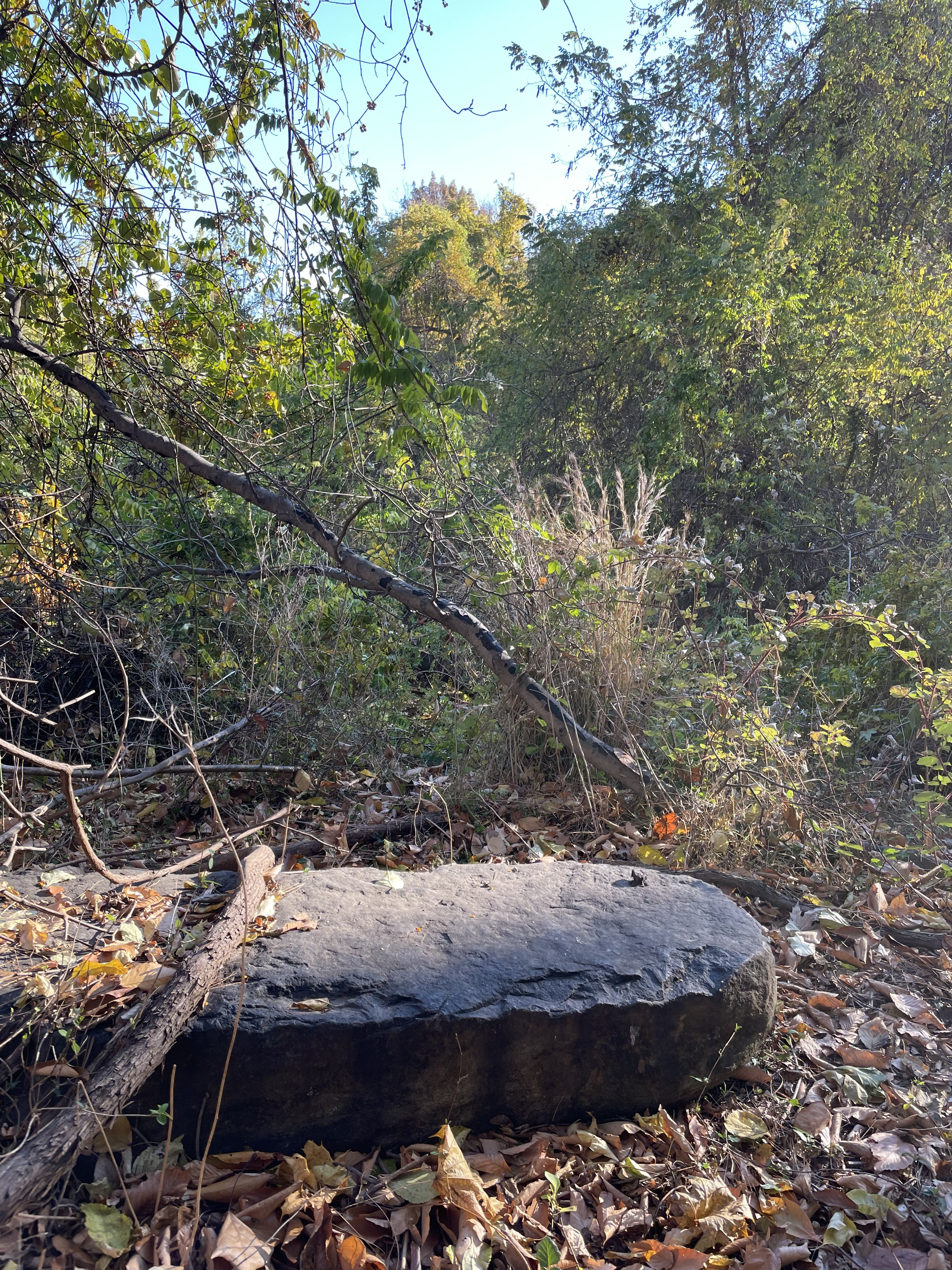
Rock on a Mound In Forwood Preserve

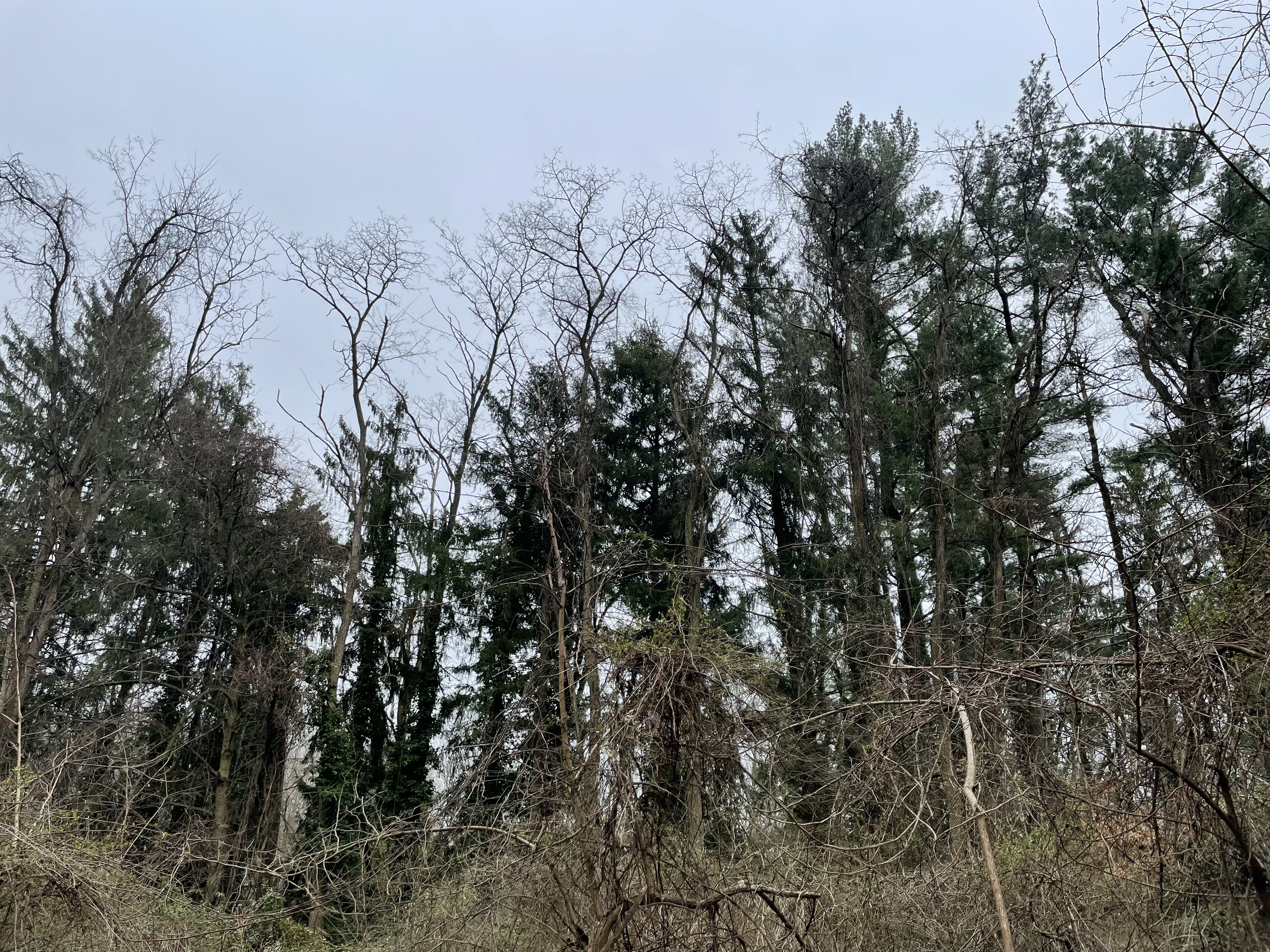
Evergreen Trees in Forwood Preserve

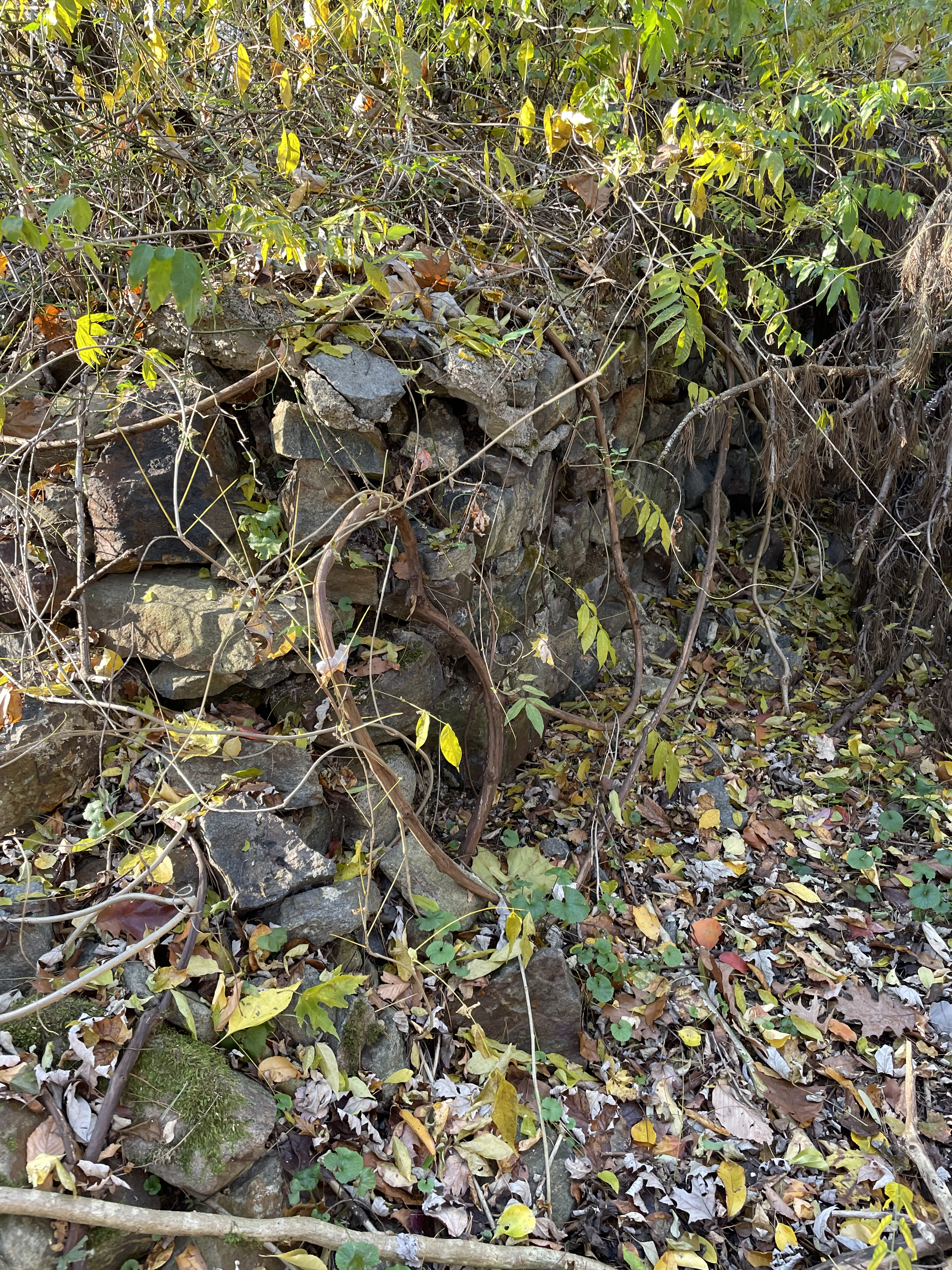
Rock Walls In Forwood Preserve
