= Stoney Creek (Delaware) =

Creek in Delaware, U.S.

Stony Creek Tributary to Delaware River
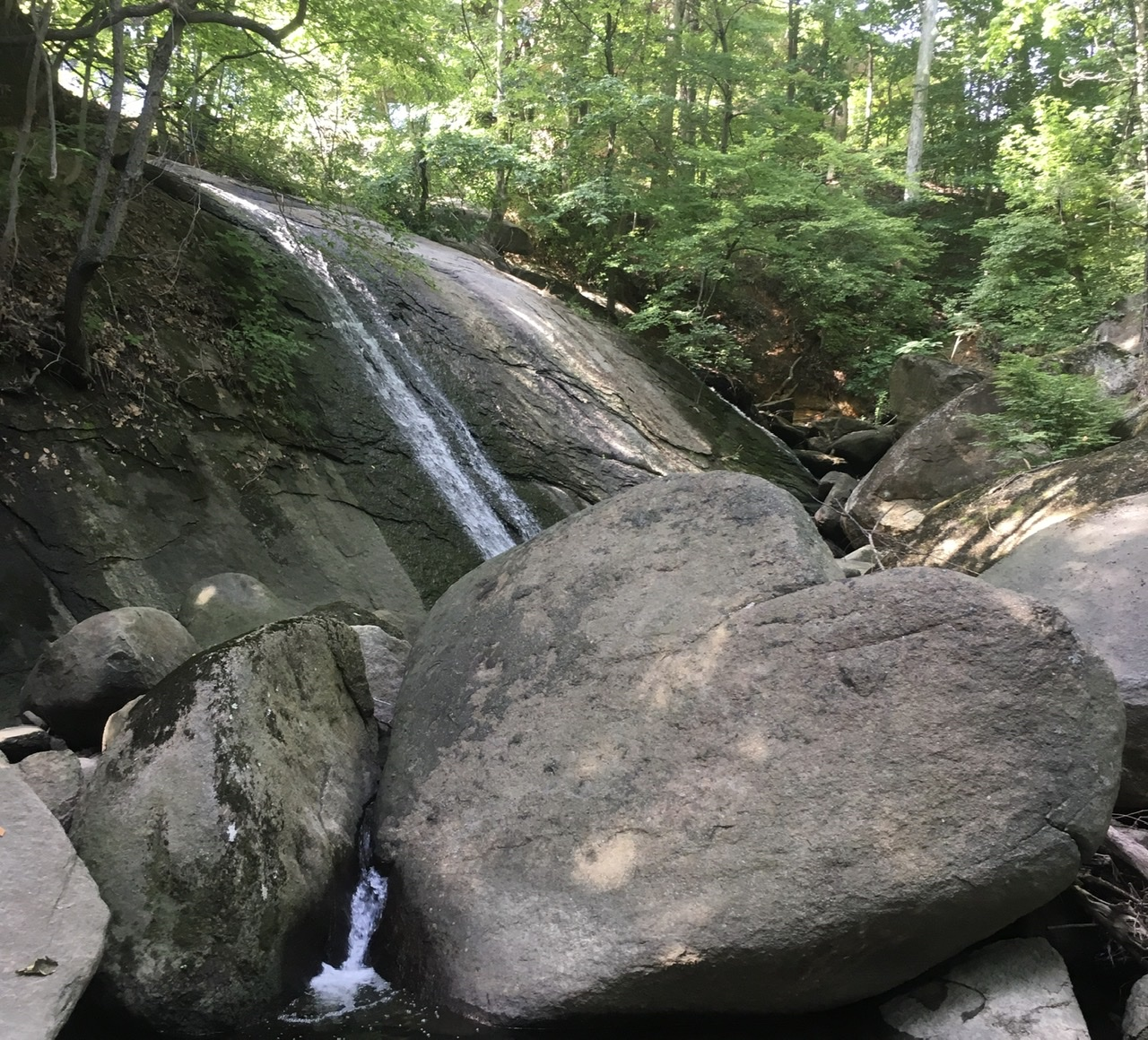
- Stenkill Falls along Stony Creek

- Location of Stony Creek Mouth Stoney Creek (Delaware) (the United States)

Location
- Country: United States
- State: Delaware
- County: New Castle
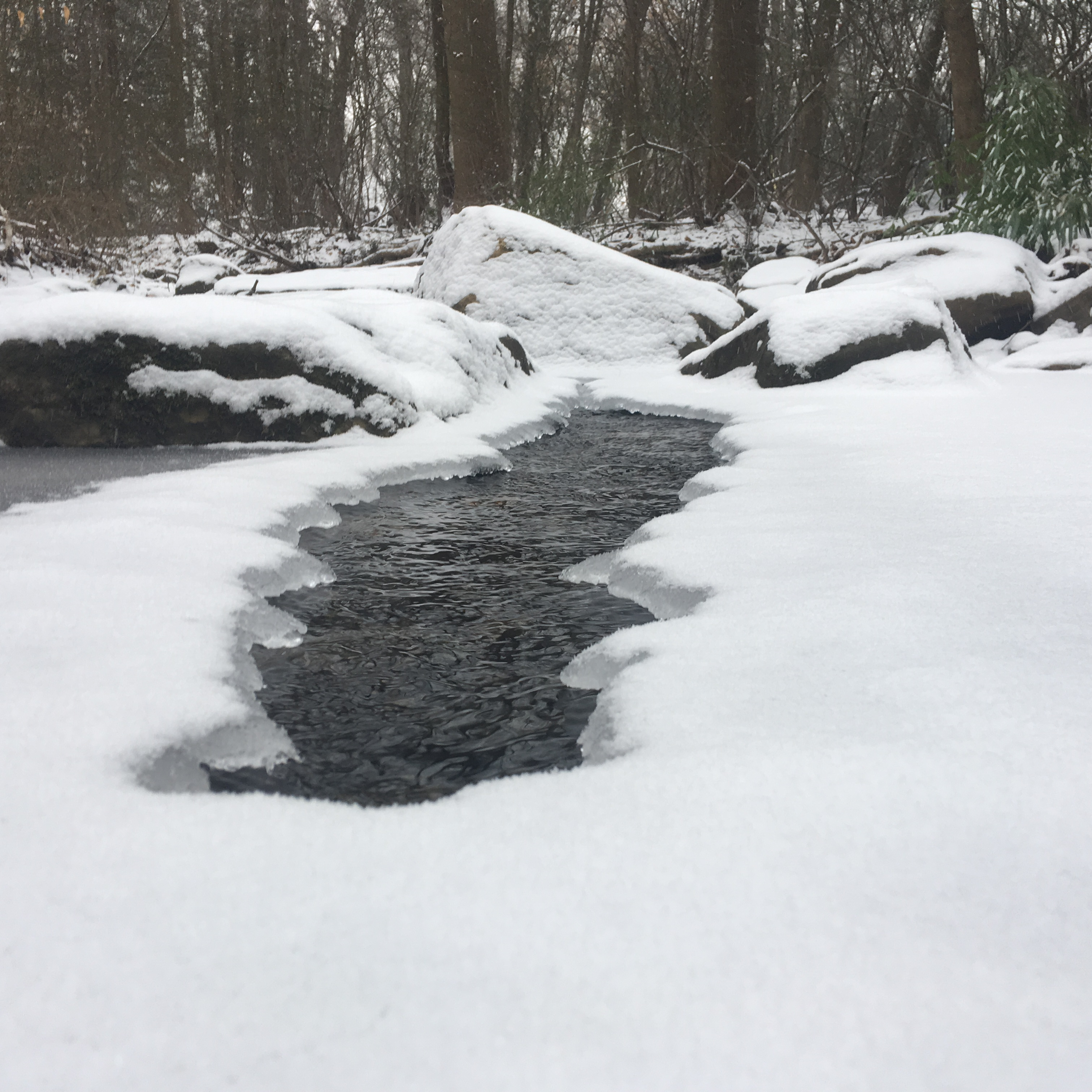
- Municipality: Stony Creek in the winter of 2019

Physical characteristics
- Source: Perkins Run divide
  - location: Westwood, Delaware
  - coordinates: 39°48′18″N 075°30′07″W
  - elevation: 340 ft (100 m)
- Mouth: Delaware River
  - location: Bellevue, Delaware
  - coordinates: 39°46′26″N 075°28′48″W
  - elevation: 0 ft (0 m)
- Length: 4.7 mi (7.6 km)
- Basin size: 2.36 square miles (6.1 km^{2})
- Discharge
  - average: 3.37 cu ft/s (0.095 m^{3}/s) at mouth with Stenkil Creek

Basin features
- Progression: southeast
- River system: Delaware River
- Tributaries
  - left: Fox Run (Delaware) (Flows through Forwood Preserve), Boulder Run (Delaware) flows through Bellevue State Park.
  - right: Kallved Creek (Delaware) Name has Swedish origins, “kall” meaning cold and “ved” meaning wood.
- Waterbodies: Bellevue Lake
- Waterfalls: Stenkill Falls and Tukohtene Falls
- Bridges: Marsh Road (Delaware Route 3); Veale Road; Silverside Road; I-95; Carr Road; Philadelphia Pike; US 13; I-495

Stoney Creek is a 2.76 mi (4.44 km) long second order tributary to the Delaware River in New Castle County, Delaware.

== Variant names ==
According to the Geographic Names Information System, it has also been known historically as:

- Fransens Creek
- Oele Fransens Creek
- Tukohtene Creek
- Quarry Creek
- Quarryville Creek
- Stenkill Creek
- Stony Creek

== Course and dam ==
Stoney Creek rises on the Perkins Run divide in Westwoods in New Castle County, Delaware and flows southeast to mouth at the Delaware River just north of Fox Point State Park. It passes through in Bellevue State Park. Tukohtene Falls (Lenape for round mountain) is a ten-foot waterfall located in the park.

Bellevue Lake is a reservoir created by the impounding of Stoney Creek in 1936. it has a capacity of 100 millions gallons of water. Bellevue Lake is a remnant of the Old Bellevue Quarry, which was allowed to fill. (The harvested stone was used to build the Delaware Breakwater) It is 0.2 miles (0.32 km) miles across and covers 11 acres (4.5 ha). The reservoir supplied the Wilmington and Suburban Water Comopany, which was founded in 1933 and has since absorbed into Suez Water.

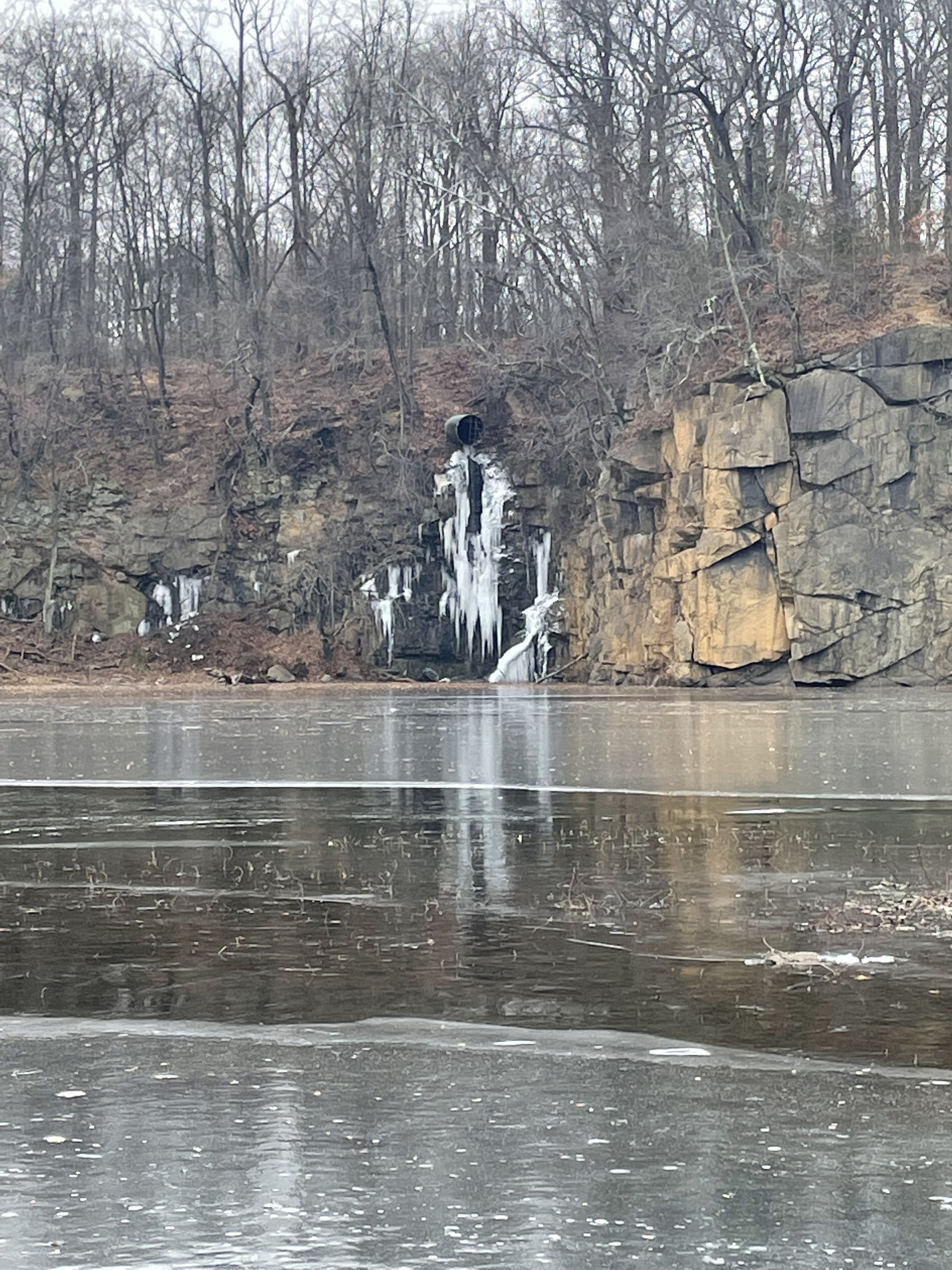
Boulder Run entering Bellevue Lake

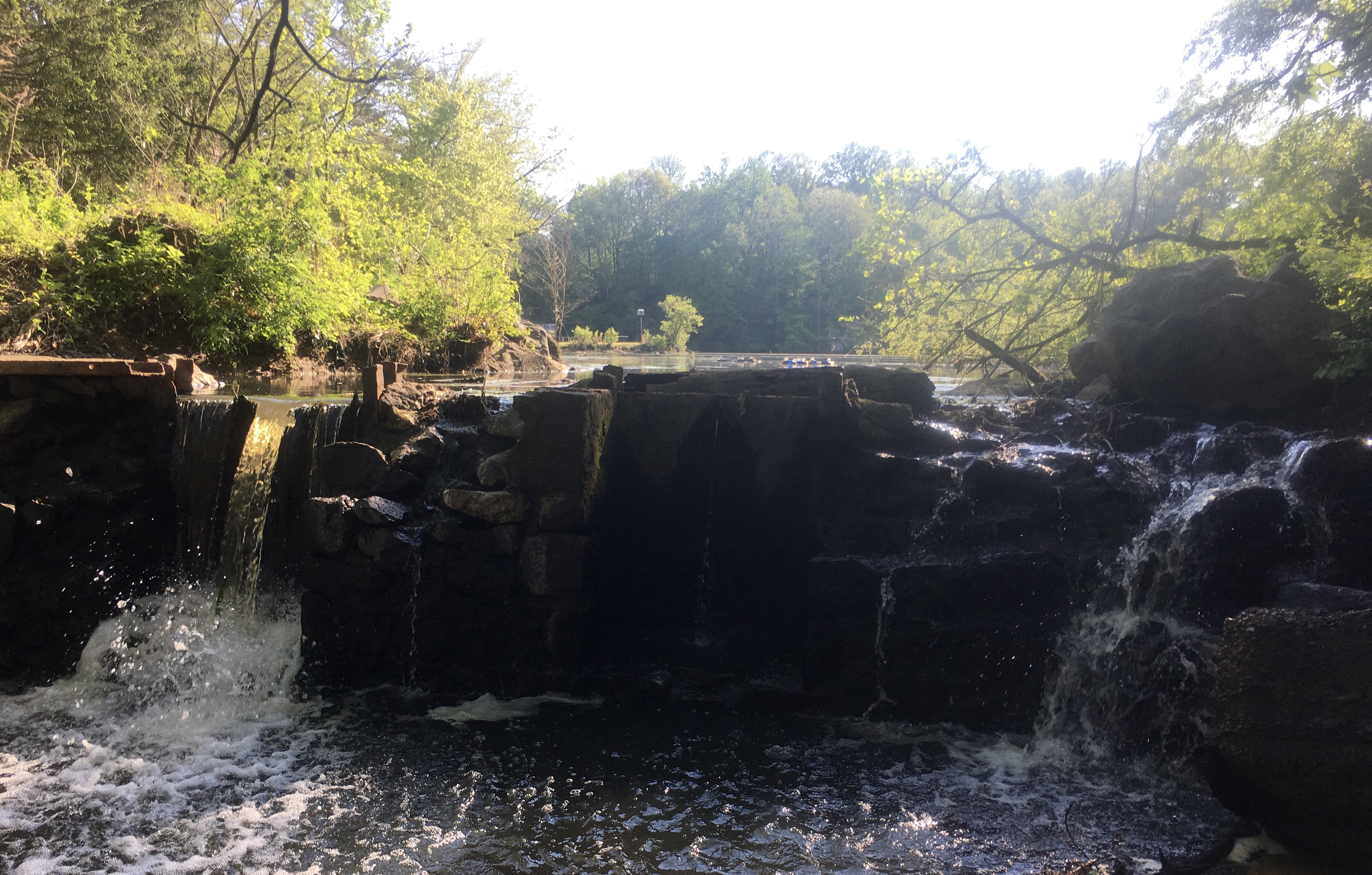
Bellevue Lake Dam

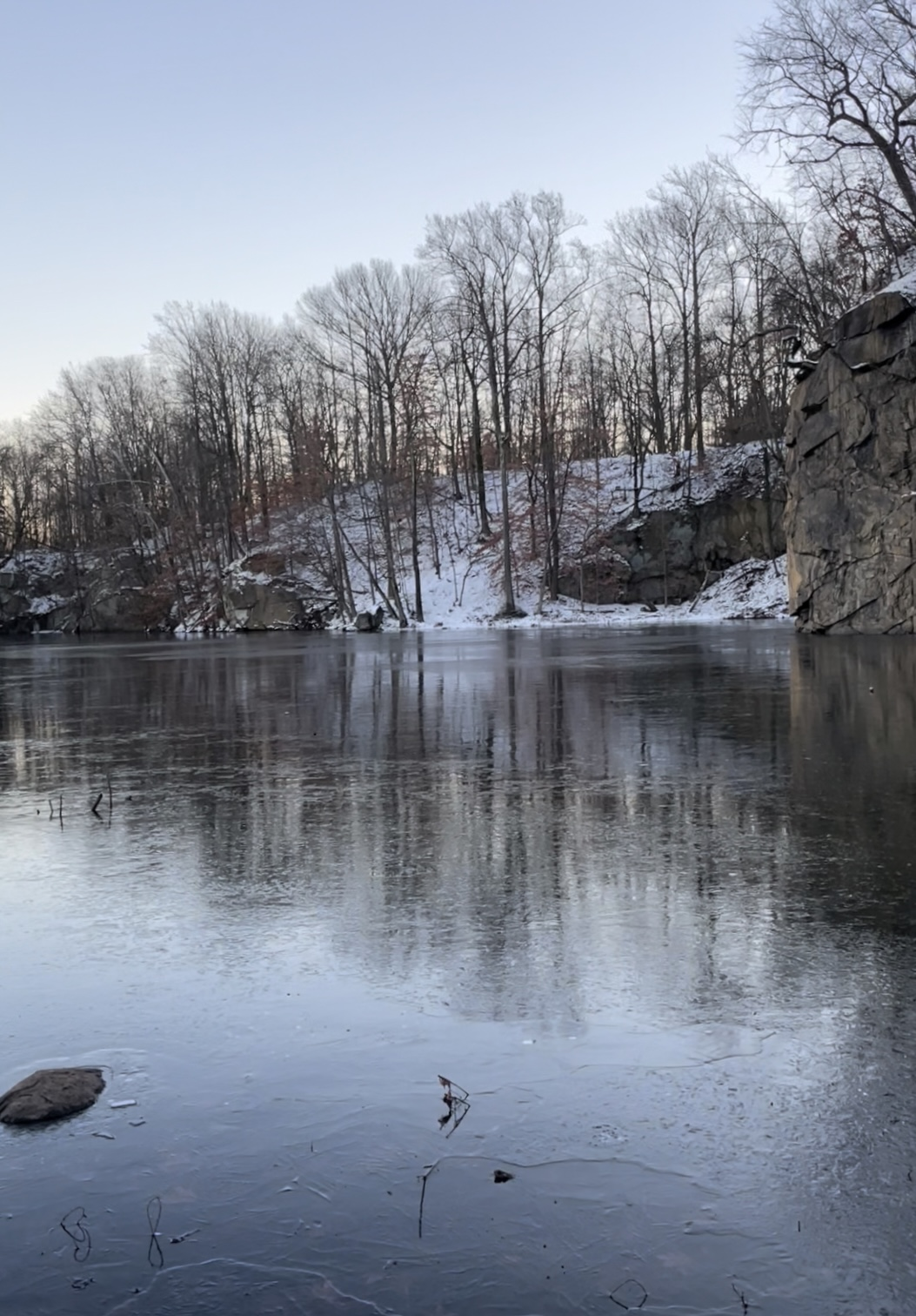

== Watershed ==
Stony Creek has a stream segment length of 1 km. Its watershed drains 2.36 square miles (6.1 km^{2}) of area, receives about 46.8 inches (119 cm) of precipitation per year and 24 inches of snow annually. It has a topographic wetness index of 475.50, is about 17.6% forested, and a mean temperature of 12.5 °C (54.5 °F). Located in the deciduous and mixed forests. It is one of four major streams that empty into the Delaware River from the Piedmont in Delaware, the others are Shellpot Creek, Perkins Run and Naamans Creek.

== Images ==
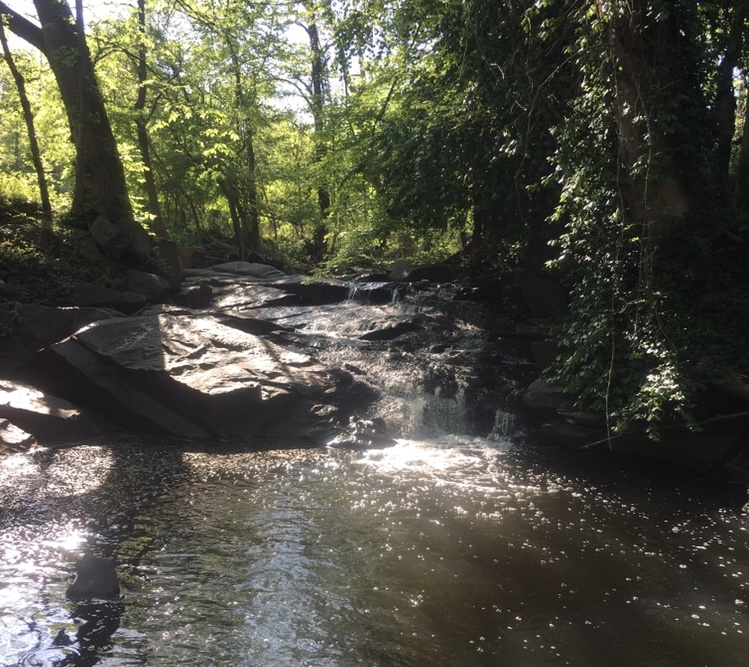
Tukohtene Falls

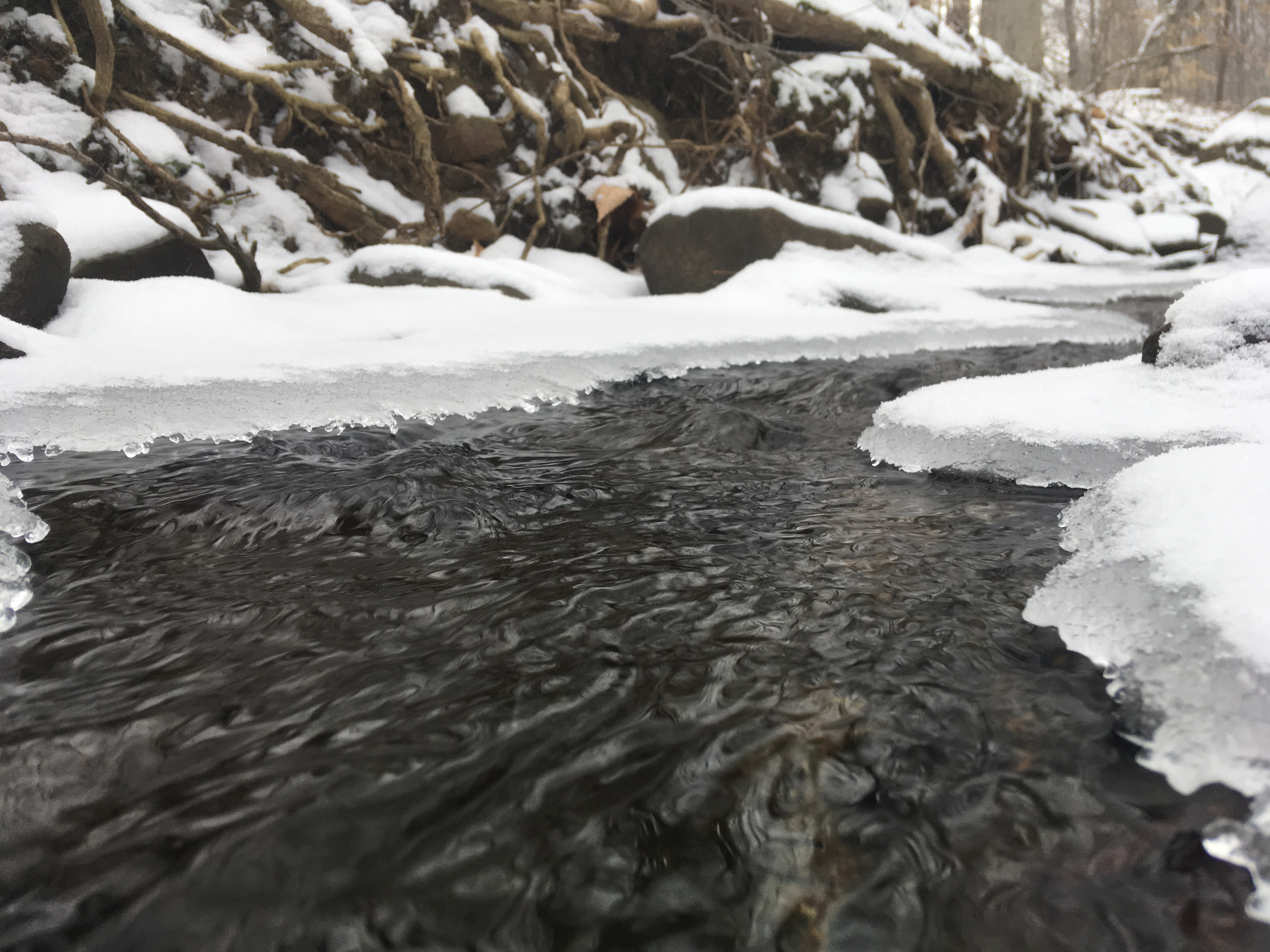
Stony Creek (February 2019)

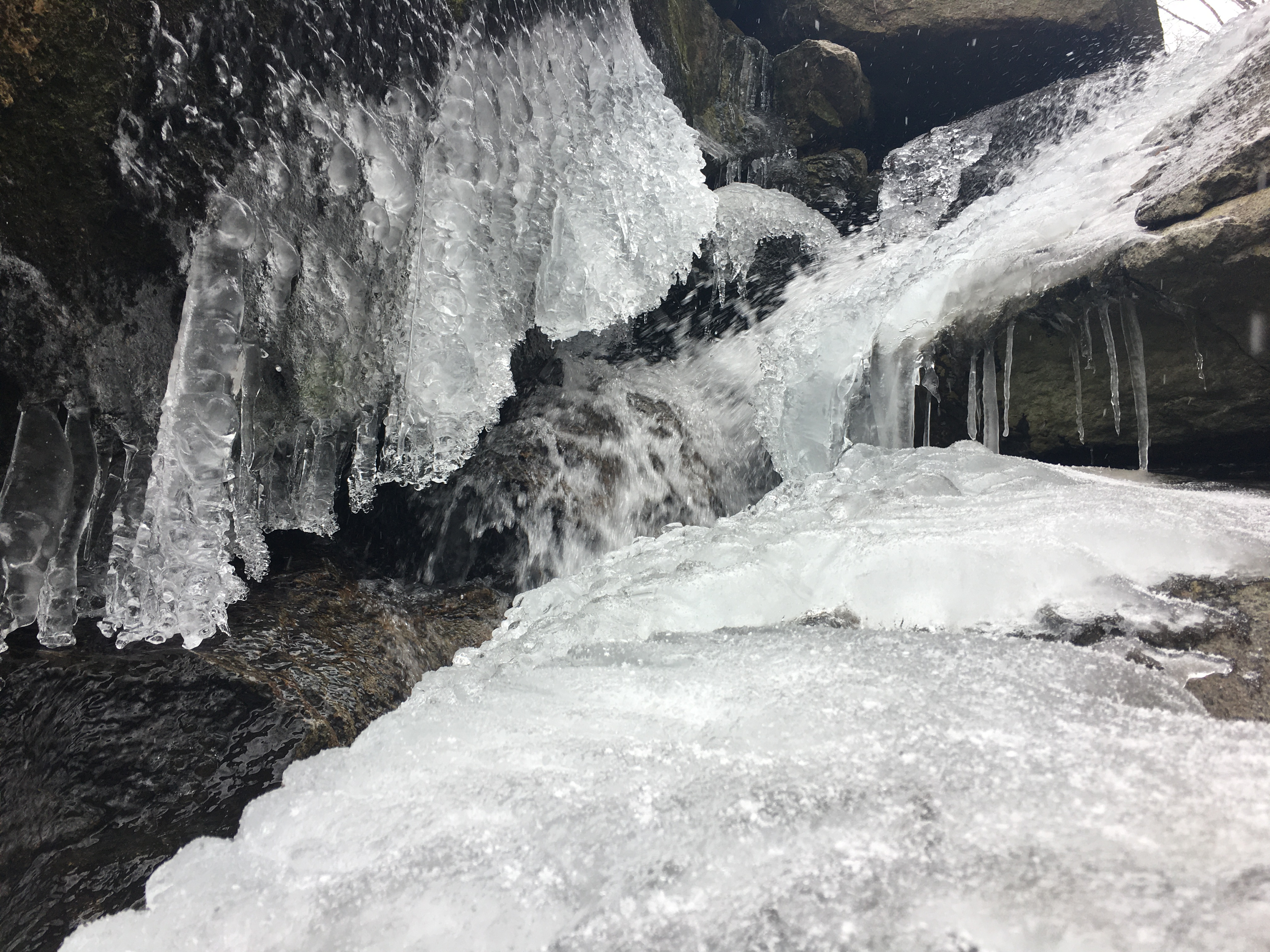
Stenkill Falls

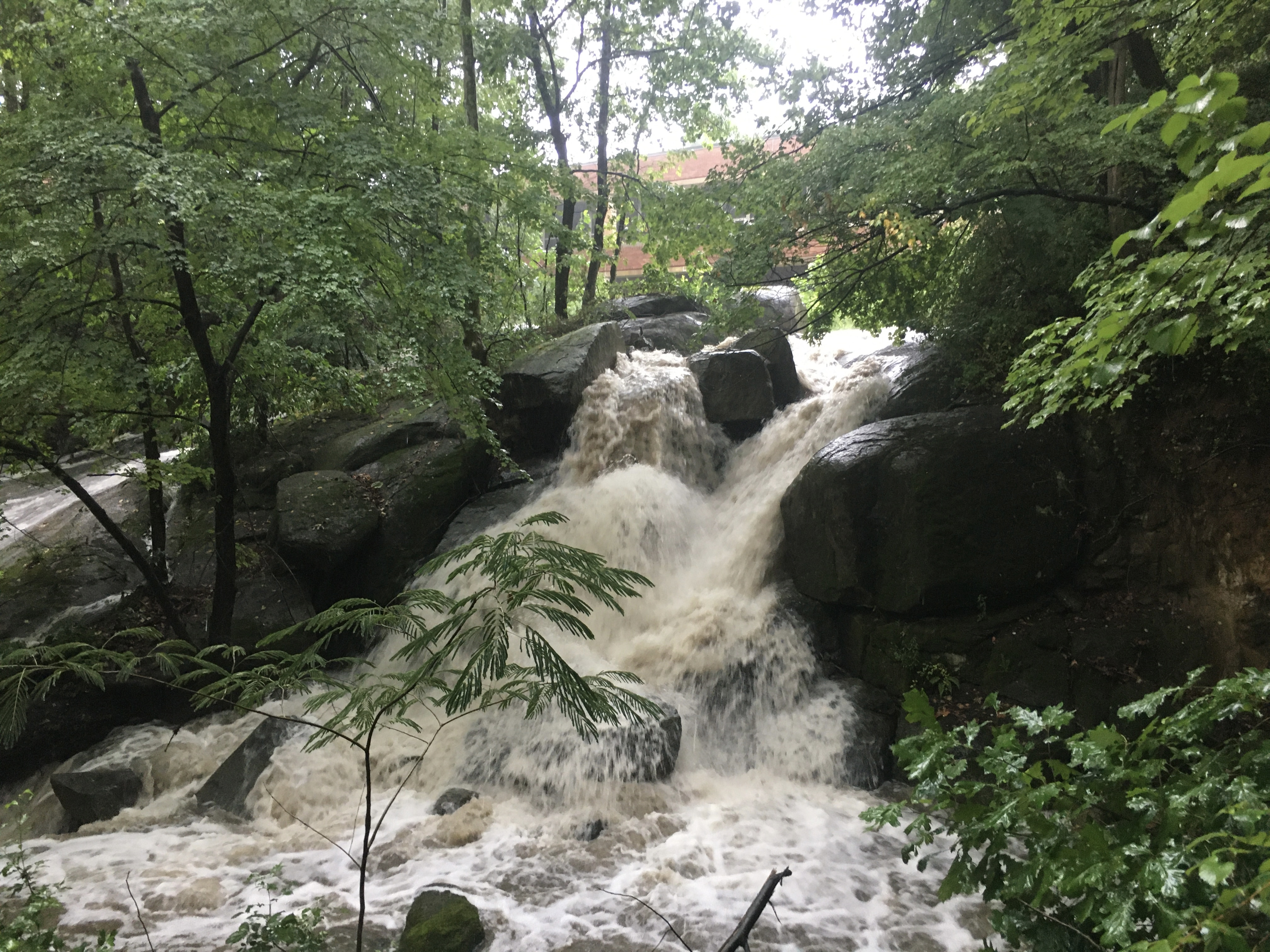
Stenkill Falls flooded

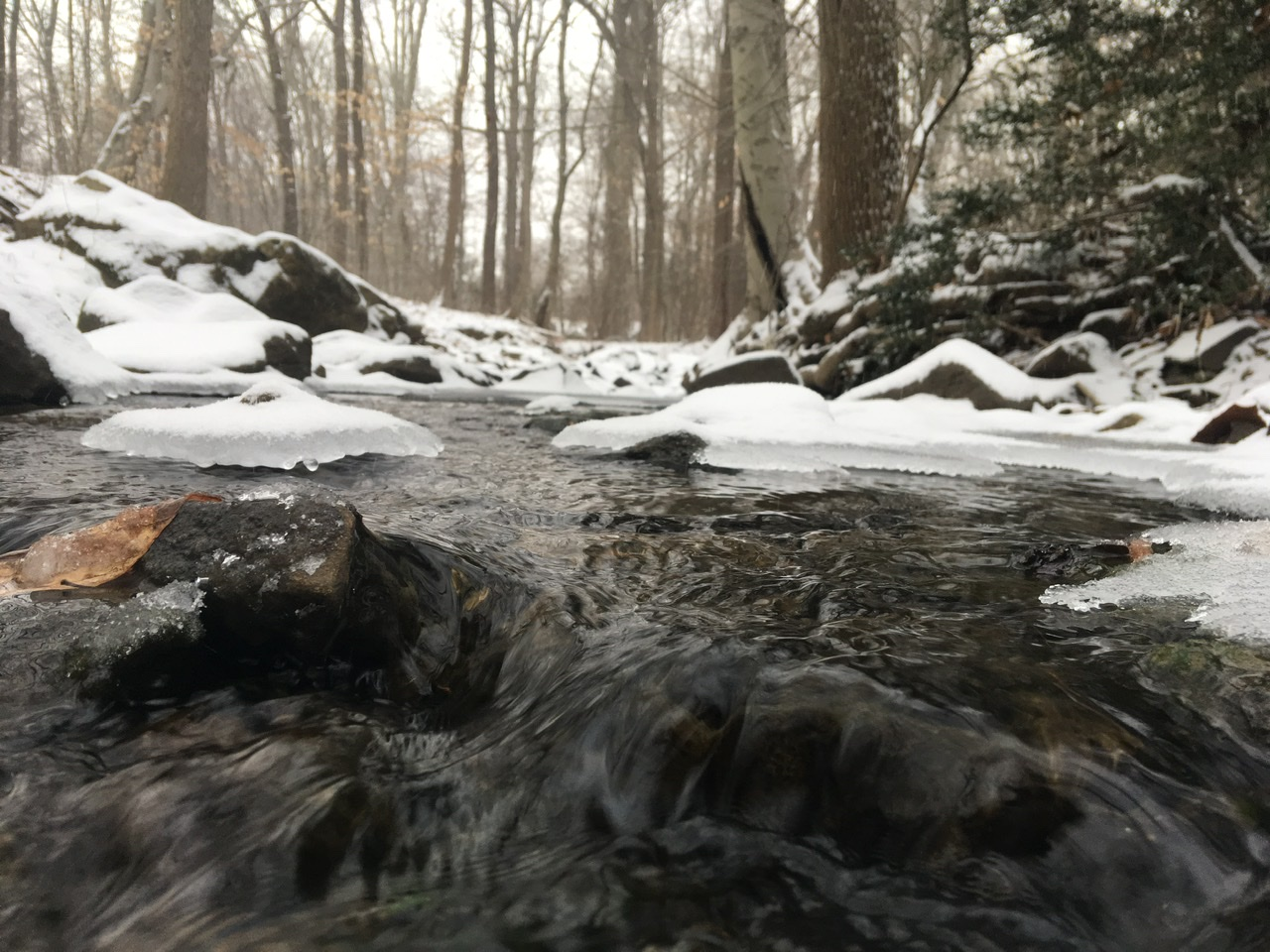
Near Allen Tract Park

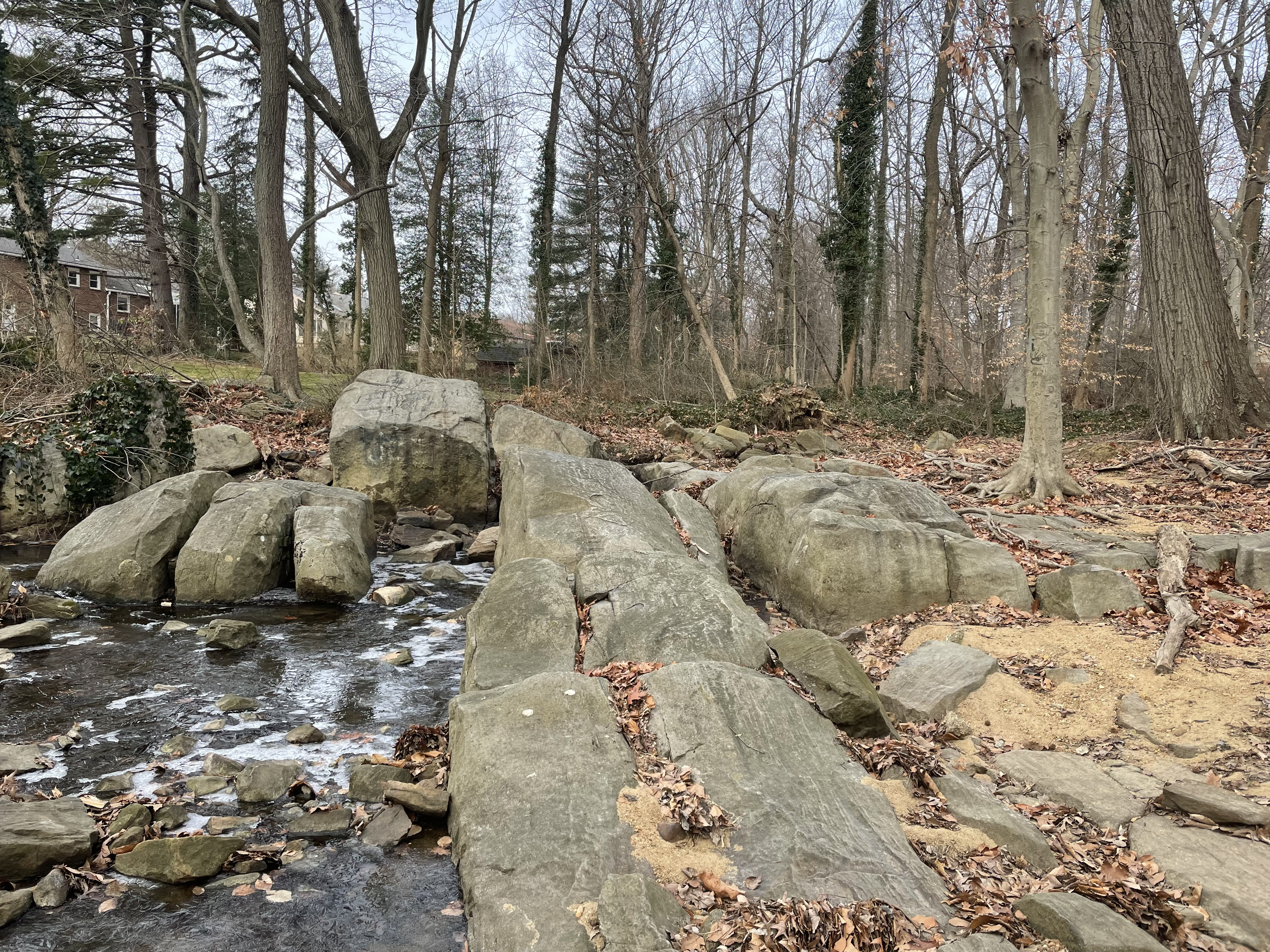
Rocks in Carcroft Crest Park

== See also ==
- List of rivers of Delaware
