= Bellevue State Park (Delaware) =

State park in Delaware, United States

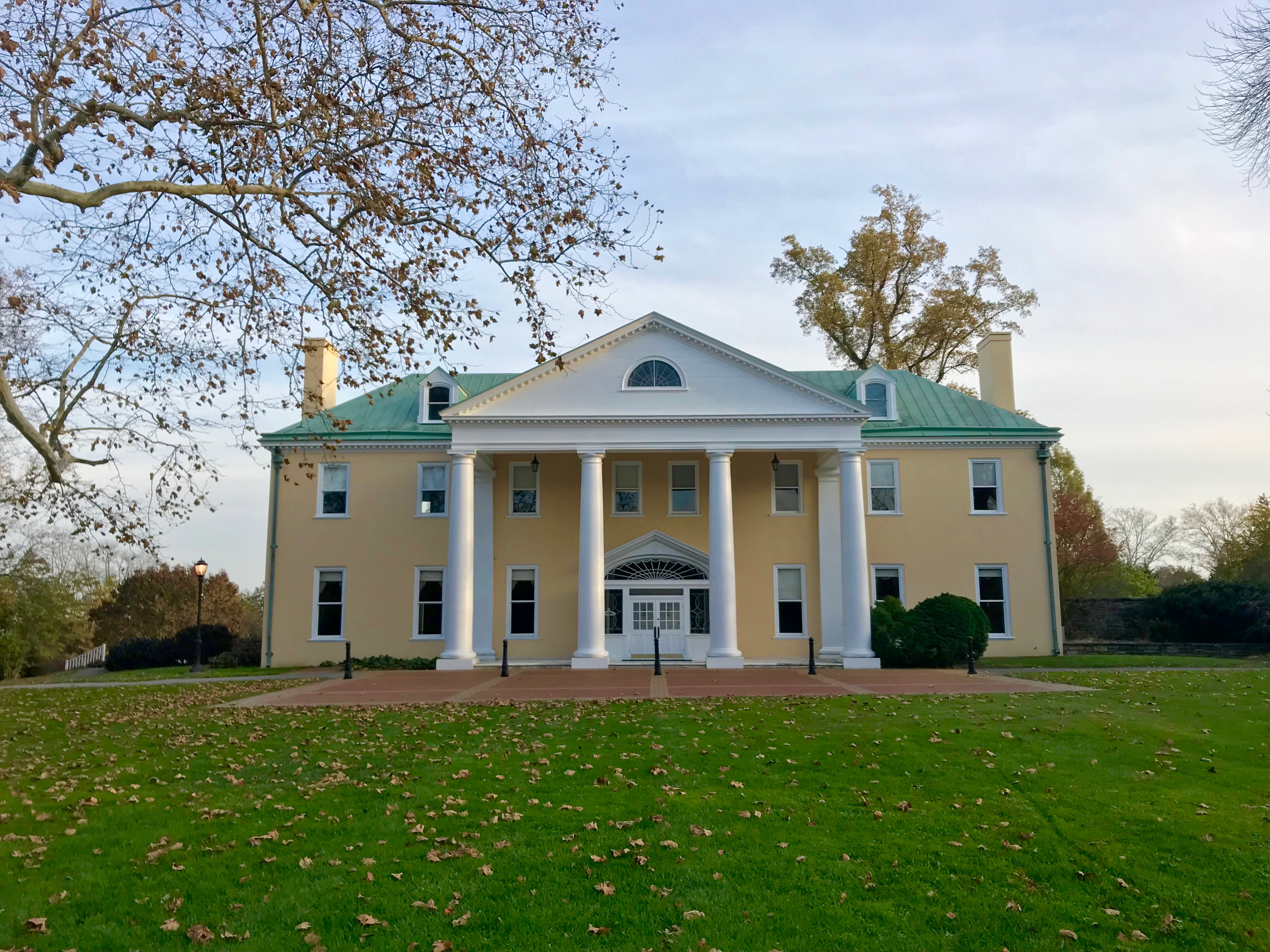
- Bellevue Hall

- Location within Delaware Location within the United States
- Interactive map of Bellevue State Park
- Location: New Castle County, Delaware, United States
- Coordinates: 39°46′45″N 75°29′45″W
- Area: 331.02 acres (133.96 ha)
- Elevation: 190 feet (58 m)
- Established: 1976
- Administrator: Delaware Department of Natural Resources and Environmental Control
- Website: Official website

Bellevue State Park is a 331-acre (134 ha) public recreation area overlooking the Delaware River in the suburbs of Wilmington in New Castle County, Delaware, United States. The state park is named for Bellevue Hall, the former mansion of William du Pont Jr. Many of the facilities at the park were built by du Pont. The Mount Pleasant Methodist Episcopal Church and Parsonage is located in Bellevue State Park; it was added to the National Register of Historic Places in 1998. Cauffiel House is a historic home in the park near Stoney Creek.

== History ==
The lands which comprise the bulk of Bellevue State Park were originally the estate of a wealthy wool merchant, Hanson Robinson. In 1855, Robinson built a Gothic Revival castle as the centerpiece of his property and named it Woolton Hall. The dark stone castle was outfitted with several towers that allowed Robinson to get a scenic view of the Delaware River. Next to the entrance to the park, there still remains a small monument that Robinson installed marking the year he built the home.

The estate was acquired by shipping magnate C. R. Griggs after the death of Robinson. Griggs kept Woolton Hall intact, but built a carriage house in the 1870s to house his collection of antique carriages.

In 1893, William du Pont Sr. purchased the estate. du Pont built a number of buildings on the property, including barns and horse stables. Upon his death in 1928, the estate was inherited by his son, William du Pont Jr. du Pont remodeled Woolton Hall so that it was a replica of Montpelier, the former residence of President James Madison which had also been du Pont's boyhood home. The home was renamed Bellevue Hall.

Wiliam du Pont Jr. was married to equestrian Jean Liseter Austin until 1941, and married to tennis professional Margaret Osborne duPont from 1947 to 1964. While married to his first wife, du Pont greatly expanded the horse facilities at Bellevue, including building two indoor tracks and an outdoor track. During his marriage to Osborne, they built additional recreational facilities, including a swimming pool and both an indoor and outdoor tennis court.

Following du Pont's death in 1965, his children had no interest in maintaining ownership of the estate with all of its recreational facilities. The estate was purchased by the state of Delaware in 1976 and opened to the public as Bellevue State Park.

== Recreation ==
The park offers hiking, biking, fishing and disc golfing and is home to the Bellevue Tennis Center and Wellspring Farms.
