= Mount Pleasant Methodist Episcopal Church and Parsonage =

Historic church in Delaware, United States

- U.S. National Register of Historic Places
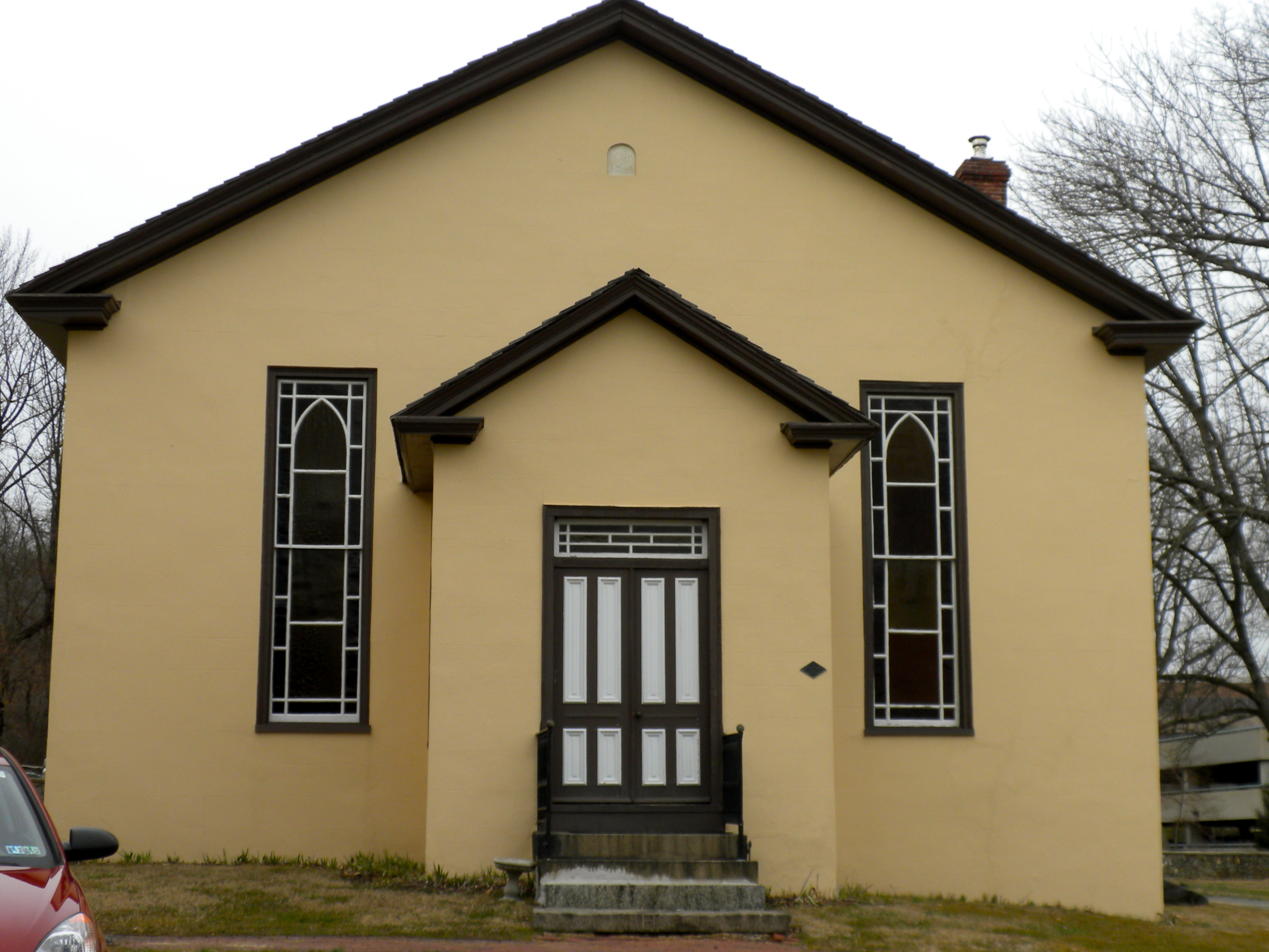

- Location within Delaware Location within the United States
- Location: 1009 Philadelphia Pike
- Nearest city: Wilmington, Delaware
- Coordinates: 39.77708°N 75.49072°W
- Area: 1.2 acres (0.49 ha)
- Built: 1838
- Architect: Harvey, George; Springer, Lewis
- Architectural style: Queen Anne
- NRHP reference No.: 98001097
- Added to NRHP: August 28, 1998

Mount Pleasant Methodist Episcopal Church and Parsonage is a historic Methodist Episcopal church and parsonage located at Wilmington, New Castle County, Delaware. It was built in 1838, and is a one-story, stuccoed stone structure with a gable roof. It measures approximately 50 feet by 40 feet, and has a gable-roofed vestibule added in 1893. Adjacent to the church is the parsonage built in 1894. It is a 2 1/2-story, four-bay L-shaped frame dwelling in the Queen Anne style. It sits on a fieldstone foundation and features gray-green fish-scale shingles. Adjacent is the contributing church cemetery with burials dating back to 1841.

It was added to the National Register of Historic Places in 1998. It is now part of Bellevue State Park, a Delaware state park.
