= Perkins Run (Delaware River tributary) =

Perkins Run Tributary to Delaware River
- Location within Delaware Location within the United States

Location
- Country: United States
- State: Delaware
- County: New Castle
- City: Arden; Ardencroft; Holly Oak

Physical characteristics
- Source: South Branch Naamans Creek divide
  - location: Arden, Delaware
  - coordinates: 39°48′48″N 075°29′56″W
  - elevation: 320 ft (98 m)
- Mouth: Delaware River
  - location: about 0.2 miles east of Holly Oak, Delaware
  - coordinates: 39°47′07″N 075°28′12″W
  - elevation: 0 ft (0 m)
- Length: 3.03 mi (4.88 km)
- Basin size: 1.93 square miles (5.0 km^{2})
- Discharge
  - average: 2.71 cu ft/s (0.077 m^{3}/s) at mouth with Delaware River

Basin features
- Progression: southeast
- River system: Delaware River
- Tributaries
  - left: unnamed tributaries
  - right: unnamed tributaries
- Bridges: Durboraw Road, Avery Lane, Veale Road, I-95, Parkside Boulevard, Garfield Avenue, Lincoln Avenue, Philadelphia Pike, Devon Road, Governor Printz Boulevard, I-495

Perkins Run is a 3.03 mi (4.88 km) long 2nd order tributary to the Delaware River in New Castle County, Delaware. The run is named for the Perkins Farm that was located near the mouth.

== Course ==
Perkins Run rises on the South Branch Naamans Creek divide in Arden, Delaware. Perkins Creek then flows southeast to meet the Delaware River about 0.2 miles east of Holly Oak.

== Watershed ==
Perkins Run drains 1.93 square miles (5.0 km^{2}) of area, receives about 46.5 in/year of precipitation, has a topographic wetness index of 458.40 and is about 16.7% forested.

== See also ==
- List of rivers of Delaware
- List of Delaware River tributaries
