= Swamp oak =

Swamp oak is a common name for several plants and may refer to:

- Casuarina glauca, also called swamp she-oak
- Casuarina cristata, native to Australia
- Quercus bicolor, native to North America
- Quercus palustris, native to North America
